= List of cancelled military projects =

This is a list of cancelled military projects.

== Argentina ==
=== Fuerza Aérea Argentina ===
- FMA I.Ae. 27 Pulqui I
- FMA I.Ae. 37
- FMA I.Ae. 48
- FMA IA 62
- FMA IAe 33 Pulqui II
- FMA SAIA 90
- I.Ae. 30 Ñancú
- Condor (Argentine missile)

== Australia ==
=== Royal Australian Navy ===
- Attack-class submarine
- Australian light destroyer project
- Kaman SH-2G(A) Super Seasprite

=== Australian Army ===
- LCM2000-class landing craft mechanised
- Landing Ship Medium Mark II
- Project Waler

=== Royal Australian Air Force ===
- AAC Wamira
- CAC CA-15
- CAC CA-23
- CAC Woomera

== Brazil ==
=== Exército Brasileiro ===
- EE-T1 Osório

=== Brazilian Air Force ===
- Baumgartl PB-60
- CBT BQM-1BR
- CTA Convertiplano

== Canada ==
=== Pre-Unification ===
==== Canadian Army ====
- Velvet Glove
- Bobcat (armoured personnel carrier) (1952–1963)

==== Royal Canadian Air Force ====
===== Fighters =====
- Avro Canada CF-103 (1950–1951)
- Avro Canada CF-105 Arrow (1953–1959)

===== Missiles =====
- Velvet Glove AAM (1953–1956)

==== Royal Canadian Navy ====
- General Purpose Frigate (Canada)
- Polar 8 Project
- Bras d'Or class (1960–1971)
- Canada-class submarine (1987-1989)

=== Canadian Forces ===
==== Land Forces ====
- Multi-Mission Effects Vehicle (2005–2007)

== Czechoslovakia/Czech Republic ==
=== Vzdušné síly Armády ===
- Aero A.24

== Egypt ==
=== Egyptian Air Force ===
- Helwan HA-300

== France ==
=== French Army ===
- FCM 50t
- AMX-50
- Lorraine 40t

=== French Navy ===
- Alsace-class battleship
- Joffre-class aircraft carrier
- PH 75
- French aircraft carrier PA2

=== French Air Force ===
- Aero A.24
- Latécoère 550
- ANF Les Mureaux 120
- ANF Les Mureaux 170
- ANF Les Mureaux 180
- ANF Les Mureaux 190
- Arsenal VG 90
- Nord 2200
- Sud-Ouest Espadon
- SNCASO Trident
- SNCASE SE.212 Durandal
- Dassault Hirondelle
- BAC/Dassault AFVG
- Dassault Mirage G
- Dassault Mirage 4000

== Germany ==
=== Military of the German Empire ===
==== Imperial German Navy ====
- German aircraft carrier I (1915)
- Ersatz Yorck-class battlecruiser
- Mackensen-class battlecruiser

=== Wehrmacht ===
==== Heer ====
- Landkreuzer P. 1500 Monster
- Landkreuzer P. 1000 Ratte

==== Kriegsmarine ====
- H-class battleship proposals
- O-class battlecruiser
- Graf Zeppelin-class aircraft carrier
- Jade-class aircraft carrier

==== Luftwaffe ====
- Ural bomber
- Amerikabomber
- AEG helicopter
- Albatros D.IV
- Arado Ar 198
- Arado E.560
- Arado E.340
- Arado E.381
- Arado E.555
- Arado E.583
- Argus Fernfeuer
- Blohm & Voss P 196
- Blohm & Voss P 197
- Blohm & Voss P 204
- Blohm & Voss P 211
- Blohm & Voss P 214
- Blohm & Voss P 163
- Blohm & Voss P 170
- Blohm & Voss P 178
- Blohm & Voss P 184
- Blohm & Voss P 192
- Blohm & Voss P 193
- Blohm & Voss P 198
- Blohm & Voss P 203
- Blohm & Voss P 208
- Blohm & Voss P 209
- Blohm & Voss P 212
- Blohm & Voss P 213
- Blohm & Voss P 215
- Blohm & Voss P.202
- DFS 228
- Dornier Do 13
- Dornier Do 19
- Dornier Do 29 (1934)
- Dornier Do 31
- Dornier Do 32
- Dornier Do 214
- Dornier Do 231
- Dornier Do 317
- Dornier Do 417
- Dornier Do 635
- Dornier P 256
- Emergency Fighter Program
- EWR VJ 101
- Fieseler Fi 157
- Fieseler Fi 166
- Fieseler Fi 168
- Fieseler Fi 333
- Focke Rochen
- Focke-Achgelis Fa 269
- Focke-Achgelis Fa 284
- Focke-Wulf Flitzer
- Focke-Wulf Fw 42
- Focke-Wulf Fw 57
- Focke-Wulf Fw 300
- Focke-Wulf Project I
- Focke-Wulf Project II
- Focke-Wulf Project VIII
- Focke-Wulf Super Lorin
- Focke-Wulf Ta 153
- Focke-Wulf Ta 154 Moskito
- Focke-Wulf Ta 183
- Focke-Wulf Ta 254
- Focke-Wulf Ta 283
- Focke-Wulf Ta 400
- Focke-Wulf Triebflügel
- Focke-Wulf Volksjäger
- Heinkel He 119
- Heinkel He 277
- Heinkel He 343
- Heinkel He 519
- Heinkel Lerche
- Heinkel P.1073
- Heinkel P.1078
- Heinkel Wespe
- Henschel Hs 127
- Henschel Hs 130
- Horten H.XVIII
- Junkers Ju 89
- Junkers Ju 268
- Junkers Ju 288
- Junkers Ju 390
- Lippisch Delta VI
- Lippisch P.13
- Lippisch P.13a
- Lippisch P.15
- Lippisch P.20
- MBB Lampyridae
- Messerschmitt Bf 109TL
- Messerschmitt Bf 162
- Messerschmitt Me 261
- Messerschmitt Me 264
- Messerschmitt Me 265
- Messerschmitt Me 310
- Messerschmitt Me 328
- Messerschmitt Me 329
- Messerschmitt Me 509
- Messerschmitt Me 609
- Messerschmitt P.1079
- Messerschmitt P.1099
- Messerschmitt P.1103
- Messerschmitt P.1106
- Messerschmitt P.1108
- Messerschmitt P.1110
- Messerschmitt P.1111
- Messerschmitt P.1112
- Škoda-Kauba P14
- Sombold So 344
- VFW VAK 191B
- Zeppelin Fliegende Panzerfaust
- Zeppelin Rammer
- ZSO 523

==== Other ====
- Biblical artifacts various projects
- German nuclear weapons program

=== Bundeswehr ===
==== German Army ====
- MBT-70
- VT tank

==== German Air Force ====
- EWR VJ 101
- VFW VAK 191B
- MBB Lampyridae
- Dornier Viper

== India ==
=== Indian Air Force ===
- HAL HF-73

== Iraq ==
- Project Babylon

== Israel ==
=== Israel Defense Forces ===
==== Aviation ====
- IAI Lavi
- IAI Nammer

== Italy ==
=== Regia Marina/Italian Navy ===
- Francesco Caracciolo-class battleship

=== Regia Aeronautica/Italian Air Force ===
- Fiat BGA
- IMAM Ro.51
- Caproni Ca.165
- Caproni Ca.335
- Savoia-Marchetti SM.88
- Caproni Ca.350
- Caproni Ca.355
- Caproni Ca.356
- Piaggio P.119
- Savoia-Marchetti SM.89
- Savoia-Marchetti SM.91
- Savoia-Marchetti SM.92
- Savoia-Marchetti SM.105
- Fiat G.80
- Aerfer Ariete

=== Other ===
- Italian nuclear weapons program

== Japan ==
=== Imperial Japanese Armed Forces ===
==== Imperial Japanese Navy ====
- Design A-150 battleship

== Pakistan ==
=== Pakistan Air Force ===
- Project Sabre II

== Poland ==
=== Polish Air Force ===
- PZL-230 Skorpion

=== Polish Navy ===
- Gawron-class corvette*

== Romania ==
=== Romanian Air Force ===
- IAR 95

=== Other ===
- Danube Program

== Russia/Soviet Union ==
=== Soviet Armed Forces ===
==== Red Army/Soviet Army ====
- Hovercraft tank
- T-42 super-heavy tank
- SMK tank
- T-43 medium tank
- T-100 tank
- KV-13
- SU-14
- SU-100P
- SU-100Y
- RPG-1
- Uralmash-1
- Obiekt 140
- Obiekt 187
- Obiekt 279
- Obiekt 292
- Obiekt 416
- Obiekt 490
- Obiekt 490A
- Obiekt 770
- Obiekt 775
- Obiekt 785
- 2B1 Oka
- Kh-45
- 2A3 Kondensator 2P
- SU-152 "Taran"
- SU-152G
- S-51 Self-Propelled Gun
- 1K17 Szhatie
- 2S15 Norov
- Soviet laser pistol

==== Soviet Navy ====
- Sovetsky Soyuz-class battleship
- Kiev-class destroyer
- Kronshtadt-class battlecruiser
- Stalingrad-class battlecruiser
- Soviet aircraft carrier Riga
- Soviet aircraft carrier Ulyanovsk
- Project 1231
- Project 1153 Orel
- Project 11780

==== Strategic Rocket Forces ====
- Global Rocket 1
- Burya
- R-46 (missile)

==== Soviet Air Force ====
- Alekseyev I-21
- Alekseyev I-212
- Antonov A-40
- Ayaks
- Bartini Beriev VVA-14
- Belyayev DB-LK
- Beriev S-13
- Bratukhin B-5
- Bratukhin B-11
- Bratukhin Omega
- Chyetverikov SPL
- Chyetverikov TA
- EKIP
- Ilyushin I-21
- Ilyushin Il-1
- Ilyushin Il-6
- Ilyushin Il-8
- Ilyushin Il-16
- Ilyushin Il-20 (1948)
- Ilyushin Il-22
- Ilyushin Il-26
- Ilyushin Il-30
- Ilyushin Il-32
- Ilyushin Il-40
- Ilyushin Il-46
- Ilyushin Il-54
- Ilyushin Il-90
- Ilyushin Il-102
- Ilyushin Il-106
- Kalinin K-7
- Kamov V-50
- Kamov V-80
- Kamov V-100
- Lavochkin La-150
- Lavochkin La-168
- Lavochkin La-190
- Lavochkin La-200
- Lavochkin La-250
- Mikoyan MiG-33
- Mikoyan Project 1.44
- Mikoyan-Gurevich DIS
- Mikoyan-Gurevich I-3
- Mikoyan-Gurevich I-7
- Mikoyan-Gurevich I-75
- Mikoyan-Gurevich I-211
- Mikoyan-Gurevich I-250
- Mikoyan-Gurevich I-270
- Mikoyan-Gurevich I-320
- Mikoyan-Gurevich I-350
- Mikoyan-Gurevich MiG-6
- Mikoyan-Gurevich Ye-8
- Mikoyan-Gurevich Ye-150 family
- Mil Mi-36
- Mil Mi-42
- Mil V-5
- Mil V-7
- Mil V-16
- Moscow Aviation Institute BB-MAI
- Moskalyev SAM-13
- Myasishchev M-18
- Myasishchev M-50
- OKB-1 140
- OKB-1 150
- Polikarpov NB
- Polikarpov SPB (D)
- Polikarpov VIT-1
- Polikarpov VIT-2
- Post-PFI Soviet/Russian aircraft projects
- Putilov Stal-11
- Sukhoi P-1
- Sukhoi Shkval
- Sukhoi Su-1
- Sukhoi Su-5
- Sukhoi Su-6
- Sukhoi Su-9 (1946)
- Sukhoi Su-10
- Sukhoi Su-12
- Sukhoi Su-15 (1949)
- Sukhoi Su-17 (1949)
- Sukhoi T-3
- Sukhoi T-4
- Sukhoi T-49
- Sukhoi T-60S
- Tairov OKO-7
- Tsybin RSR
- Tupolev ANT-16
- Tupolev ANT-30
- Tupolev DB-1
- Tupolev Samolyot 135
- Tupolev TB-6
- Tupolev Tu-75
- Tupolev Tu-80
- Tupolev Tu-95LAL
- Tupolev Tu-107
- Tupolev Tu-125
- Tupolev Tu-360
- Tupolev Voron
- Yakovlev VVP-6
- Yakovlev Yak-8
- Yakovlev Yak-16
- Yakovlev Yak-25 (1947)
- Yakovlev Yak-30 (1948)
- Yakovlev Yak-30 (1960)
- Yakovlev Yak-32
- Yakovlev Yak-33
- Yakovlev Yak-35
- Yakovlev Yak-43
- Yakovlev Yak-44
- Yakovlev Yak-45
- Yakovlev Yak-50 (1949)
- Yakovlev Yak-60
- Yakovlev Yak-100
- Yakovlev Yak-140
- Yakovlev Yak-141
- Yakovlev Yak-200
- Yakovlev Yak-1000
- Zveno project

=== Russian Armed Forces ===
==== Russian Ground Forces ====
- Object 640

==== Russian Air Forces ====
- MiG 1.44

== South Korea ==
- South Korean nuclear weapons project

== Sweden ==
=== Swedish Air Force ===
- Saab 36
- Saab 38

=== Other ===
- Swedish nuclear weapons program

== United Kingdom ==
=== British Army ===
- BSA Welgun
- Elkins Automatic Rifle
- EM-2 rifle
- Farquhar-Hill rifle
- FN FAL Bullpup .280
- Howard Francis machine carbine
- L64/65
- Sterling SAR-87

=== Royal Air Force ===
- Armstrong Whitworth AW.681
- Avro 730
- BAC TSR-2
- BAE Systems Nimrod MRA4
- British Aerospace Nimrod AEW.3
- British Aerospace P.125
- Hawker P.1103
- Hawker P.1121
- Hawker Siddeley P.1154
- Vickers Type 559

=== Royal Navy ===
- CVA-01
- Hawker Siddeley P.139B
- Lion-class battleship
- Malta-class aircraft carrier
- Type 43 destroyer
- Type 82 destroyer
- Project Habakkuk

== United States ==
=== United States Army Air Corps ===
==== Bombers ====
- Huff-Daland XB-1
- Douglas Y1B-7
- Fokker XB-8
- Boeing Y1B-9
- Douglas YB-11
- Martin XB-13
- Martin XB-14
- Boeing XB-15
- Martin XB-16
- Douglas XB-19
- Boeing Y1B-20
- North American XB-21
- Douglas XB-22
- Martin XB-27
- North American XB-28

==== Fighters ====
- Douglas XP-48
- Lockheed XP-49
- Grumman XP-50

=== United States Army Air Forces ===
==== Bombers ====
- Lockheed XB-30
- Douglas XB-31
- Consolidated B-32 Dominator
- Martin XB-33 Super Marauder
- Boeing YB-40 Flying Fortress Gunship
- Consolidated XB-41 Liberator Gunship

==== Fighters ====
- Vultee XP-54
- Curtiss XP-55 Ascender
- Northrop XP-56 Black Bullet
- Lockheed XP-58 Chain Lightning
- Lockheed L-133 Starjet
- Bell P-59 Airacomet
- Curtiss XP-62
- McDonnell XP-67 Bat
- Republic XP-72
- Fisher (General Motors) P-75 Eagle
- Bell XP-76
- Northrop XP-79
- Convair XP-81
- Bell XP-83

=== United States Air Force ===
==== Bombers ====
- XB-35
- YB-49
- XB-70 Valkyrie
- FICON project
- B-72 (WS-125)
- Convair X-6
- Aircraft Nuclear Propulsion

==== Fighters ====
- Northrop YA-9
- Lockheed YF-12
- Republic XF-103
- North American F-107
- XF-108 Rapier
- Bell XF-109
- Northrop F-20 Tigershark
- Northrop YF-23

==== Other ====
- Project Pluto
- Supersonic Low Altitude Missile
- BGM-75 AICBM
- WS-124A Flying Cloud
- Blue Gemini
- Manned Orbiting Laboratory
- Peacekeeper Rail Garrison
- Safeguard Program

=== United States Navy/United States Marine Corps ===
- Electronic laser

==== Attack Aircraft ====
- Douglas A2D Skyshark
- North American A2J Super Savage
- McDonnell Douglas A-12 Avenger II

==== Fighters ====
- Grumman XF5F Skyrocket
- Goodyear F2G
- Douglas F6D Missileer
- Grumman XF10F Jaguar
- General Dynamics F-111B
- Convair F2Y Sea Dart

==== Rotorcraft ====
- Lockheed Martin VH-71 Kestrel

==== Ships ====
- Aircraft Carrier (Medium)
- CG(X)
- Lexington-class battlecruiser
- Montana-class battleship
- Sea Control Ship
- Strike Cruiser
- South Dakota-class battleship
- USS United States (CVA-58)

=== United States Army ===
==== Small arms ====
- Model 45A
- Gyrojet Assault Rifle
- Olin/Winchester Salvo Rifle
- Thompson Carbine
- Heckler & Koch XM8
- Heckler & Koch XM29 OICW
- Heckler & Koch HK CAWS
- Special Purpose Individual Weapon
- Heckler & Koch G11

==== Armor ====
- MBT-70
- Future Combat Systems

==== Artillery ====
- XM2001 Crusader

==== SPAAG ====
- M247 Sergeant York

==== Aviation ====
- AH-56 Cheyenne
- Boeing Vertol YUH-61
- Boeing Vertol XCH-62
- RAH-66 Comanche
- Bell ARH-70

==== Other ====
- Project Iceworm

==== United States Department of Defense ====
- Project Camelot

== Yugoslavia ==
=== Yugoslav Air Force ===
- Novi Avion
