= List of German aircraft projects, 1939–1945 =

The aircraft in this list include prototype versions of aircraft used by the German Luftwaffe during World War II and unfinished wartime experimental programmes. In the former, development can stretch back to the 1920s and in the latter the project must have started between 1939-1945.

== Legitimacy of German projects ==
After the surrender of Nazi Germany several of the secret or unfinished projects of German military aircraft gained wide publicity. Also certain postwar planes such as the Bell X-5, F-86 Sabre or the MiG-15 were deemed to have been based on the pioneering work of World War II German aircraft designers. German aircraft manufacturers such as Henschel in Kassel had their archives destroyed in the course of the Allied bombing of the Third Reich at the end of World War II. Hence some of the late Henschel projects that were recreated later are based on documents found in other locations or on second-hand sources and not on the original Henschel technical drawings.

== Arado ==
(Arado Flugzeugwerke GmbH)

- Arado Ar 198
- Arado Ar 240
- Arado Ar 532 - planned enlarged four-engine version of Ar 432
- Arado Ar 632 - planned enlarged four-engine version of Ar 432
- Arado E.300
- Arado E.310
- Arado E.340 Medium bomber
- Arado E.370
- Arado E.371
- Arado E.375
- Arado E.380 Arado Ar 196 with folding wings
- Arado E.381 I - Parasite fighter
- Arado E.381 II - Parasite fighter
- Arado E.381 III - Parasite fighter
- Arado E.385
- Arado E.390
- Arado E.395 Swept wing jet bomber (Reference: German Air Projects vol. 3 1935-1945, Marek Rys)
- Arado E.396
- Arado E.401
- Arado E.430
- Arado E.432
- Arado E.433
- Arado E.440
- Arado E.441
- Arado E.470 Giant bomber (Reference: German Air Projects vol. 3 1935-1945, Marek Rys)
- Arado E.480
- Arado E.490
- Arado E.500 - Heavy fighter
- Arado E.530 - Bomber - zwilling schnellbomber design
- Arado E.532
- Arado E.555 - proposed long range flying wing bomber work stopped at end of 1944.
- Arado E.560 Swept wing jet bomber
- Arado E.560/2 twin-engine high-speed bomber
- Arado E.561 - Heavy fighter
- Arado E.580 - Fighter
- Arado E.581 - Flying wing fighter
- Arado E.581-4
- Arado E.581-5
- Arado E.583 - tailless twinjet night fighter
- Arado E.625
- Arado E.632
- Arado E.651
- Arado E.654 - Heavy fighter
- Arado Projekt I - Night fighter
- Arado Projekt II - Night/All-weather fighter
- Arado PTL-Strahlbomber - Swept wing turboprop bomber (Reference: German Air Projects vol. 3 1935-1945, Marek Rys)
- Arado TEW 16/43-13
- Arado TEW 16/43-15
- Arado TEW 16/43-19
- Arado TEW 16/43-23 jet fighter

== Bachem ==
(Bachem-Werke GmbH)

- Bachem Ba 349 Natter
- Ba BP 20 - (Manned Flak Rocket) First versions of Ba 349, some unable to take off vertically, with fixed landing gear and solid nose for flight testing

== Blohm & Voss ==
- Blohm & Voss Ha 139 - Seaplane transport
- Blohm & Voss Ha 140 - Seaplane prototype
- Blohm & Voss BV 141 - Reconnaissance aircraft, previously designated as Ha 141
- Blohm & Voss Ha 142 - long-range maritime patrol/transport
- Blohm & Voss BV 143 - Glide bomb (prototype)
- Blohm & Voss BV 144 - Prototype passenger transport (1944)
- Blohm & Voss BV 155 - high-altitude interceptor developed from the Me 155 (1944)
- Blohm & Voss BV 237 - dive bomber, ground attack
- Blohm & Voss BV 238 - prototype flying boat
- Blohm & Voss BV 40 - Glider fighter
- Blohm & Voss BV 138 - Flying boat
- Blohm & Voss BV 246 - guided glide bomb
- Blohm & Voss BV 726 - jet powered version of P 200
- Blohm & Voss BV 950 - Air to surface anti shipping missile.
  - Blohm & Voss L 10 - Low-speed variant of the BV 950
  - Blohm & Voss L 11 - High-speed variant of the BV 950
- Blohm & Voss BV 250 Land version of BV 238 (Reference: German Air Projects vol. 3 1935-1945, Marek Rys)
- Blohm & Voss P 1 - Single-seat fighter
- Blohm & Voss P 4 - Single-seat trainer (Ha 136 development)
- Blohm & Voss P 5 - General purpose
- Blohm & Voss P 6 - Dive bomber (Ha 137 development)
- Blohm & Voss P 7 - Biplane dive bomber
- Blohm & Voss P 8 - Flying boat
- Blohm & Voss P 9 - Flying boat (twin boom)
- Blohm & Voss P 10 - General purpose
- Blohm & Voss P 11 - Carrier based dive bomber (Ha 137 development)
- Blohm & Voss P 12 - Flying boat
- Blohm & Voss P 13 - Flying boat (twin hull)
- Blohm & Voss P 14 - Reconnaissance flying boat
- Blohm & Voss P 15 - Float Plane (Ha 139 development)
- Blohm & Voss P 16 - Float Plane (Ha 139 development)
- Blohm & Voss P 17 - Float Plane (Ha 139 development)
- Blohm & Voss P 18 - Asymmetric fighter
- Blohm & Voss P 19 - Reconnaissance (Ha 139 development)
- Blohm & Voss P 20 - Bomber (Ha 139 development)
- Blohm & Voss P 21 - General purpose
- Blohm & Voss P 22 - Fighter
- Blohm & Voss P 23 - P.22 development w/increased wing span
- Blohm & Voss P 24 - Fighter/trainer for Japan
- Blohm & Voss P 25 - Dive bomber
- Blohm & Voss P 27 - Dive Bomber
- Blohm & Voss P 28 - Rotating wing twin boom aircraft
- Blohm & Voss P 29 - Passenger aircraft
- Blohm & Voss P 33 - Long-range bomber
- Blohm & Voss P 37 - Float Plane and torpedo fighter (Ha 139 development)
- Blohm & Voss P 38 - Land version of Ha 139 w/increased wing span
- Blohm & Voss P 39 - Bomber
- Blohm & Voss P 40 - Asymmetric ground attacker aircraft
- Blohm & Voss P 41 - Improved version of Ha 137
- Blohm & Voss P 42 - Flying boat (twin boom)
- Blohm & Voss P 43 - Flying boat
- Blohm & Voss P 44 - Asymmetric reconnaissance aircraft
- Blohm & Voss P 45 - Passenger transport w/rocket-assisted takeoff
- Blohm & Voss P 46 - Ha 142 passenger aircraft development
- Blohm & Voss P 47 - Passenger transport w/rocket-assisted takeoff
- Blohm & Voss P 48 - Bomber version of Ha 142 for Japan
- Blohm & Voss P 49 - Passenger float plane
- Blohm & Voss P 50 - Freight float plane
- Blohm & Voss P 51 - Freight float plane
- Blohm & Voss P 52 - Passenger float plane
- Blohm & Voss P 53 - Passenger float plane
- Blohm & Voss P 54 - Passenger flying boat (BV 222 development)
- Blohm & Voss P 55 - Improved version of Ha 140
- Blohm & Voss P 56 - Seaplane dive bomber
- Blohm & Voss P 57 - Flying boat
- Blohm & Voss P 58 - Naval dive bomber
- Blohm & Voss P 59 - Dive and torpedo bomber
- Blohm & Voss P 60 - Flying boat
- Blohm & Voss P 61 - Improved version of Ha 138
- Blohm & Voss P 62 - Asymmetric dive bomber
- Blohm & Voss P 63 - Fast bomber
- Blohm & Voss P 64 - Long range aircraft
- Blohm & Voss P 65 - Attack version of Ha 141
- Blohm & Voss P 66 - Naval dive bomber
- Blohm & Voss P 67 - Mine laying aircraft
- Blohm & Voss P 68 - Mine layer version of BV 222
- Blohm & Voss P 69 - Target drone
- Blohm & Voss P 70 - Fast bomber
- Blohm & Voss P 71 - Bomber/heavy fighter
- Blohm & Voss P 72 - Attack version of Ha 141
- Blohm & Voss P 73 - Bomber w/pusher propellers
- Blohm & Voss P 74 - Multipurpose version of Ha 141
- Blohm & Voss P 75 - Multipurpose version of Ha 141
- Blohm & Voss P 76 - Long range reconnaissance version of BV 222
- Blohm & Voss P 77 - Long range reconnaissance version of BV 222
- Blohm & Voss P 78 - Long range floatplane
- Blohm & Voss P 79 - Long range floatplane
- Blohm & Voss P 80 - Transoceanic aircraft w/twin floats
- Blohm & Voss P 81 - Long range aircraft
- Blohm & Voss P 83 - Trans-atlantic aircraft
- Blohm & Voss P 84 - Long range aircraft
- Blohm & Voss P 85 - Trans-atlantic aircraft
- Blohm & Voss P 86 - Trans-atlantic aircraft
- Blohm & Voss P 88 - Long range heavy fighter
- Blohm & Voss P 89 - Long range heavy fighter
- Blohm & Voss P 90 - Long range heavy fighter
- Blohm & Voss P 92 - Passenger aircraft
- Blohm & Voss P 94 - Improved BV 138
- Blohm & Voss P 95 - BV 222 development
- Blohm & Voss P 96 - BV 222 development
- Blohm & Voss P 97 - BV 222 development
- Blohm & Voss P 98 - BV 222 development
- Blohm & Voss P 99 - BV 222 development
- Blohm & Voss P 100 - Target drone
- Blohm & Voss P 101 - Target drone
- Blohm & Voss P 103 - Asymmetric airliner
- Blohm & Voss P 104 - Airliner w/tail-mounted propeller
- Blohm & Voss P 105 - BV 222 development
- Blohm & Voss P 106 - BV 222 development
- Blohm & Voss P 107 - BV 222 development
- Blohm & Voss P 108 - BV 138 development
- Blohm & Voss P 109 - BV 138 development
- Blohm & Voss P 110 - BV 138 development
- Blohm & Voss P 111 - Asymmetric BV 138 development
- Blohm & Voss P 112 - Asymmetric BV 138 development
- Blohm & Voss P 113 - Asymmetric seaplane
- Blohm & Voss P 114 - BV 141 heavy fighter version
- Blohm & Voss P 116 - BV 222 development
- Blohm & Voss P 117 - BV 222 development
- Blohm & Voss P 118 - BV 222 development
- Blohm & Voss P 119 - BV 222 development
- Blohm & Voss P 122 - Maritime patrol floatplane
- Blohm & Voss P 123 - Twin hull patrol flying boat
- Blohm & Voss P 124 - Maritime patrol flying boat
- Blohm & Voss P 125 - Maritime patrol floatplane
- Blohm & Voss P 127 - Single-seat fighter
- Blohm & Voss P 128 - Asymmetric single-seat fighter
- Blohm & Voss P 129 - Fighter
- Blohm & Voss P 131 - Airliner w/tail-mounted propeller
- Blohm & Voss P 134 - Fast bomber w/pusher propeller
- Blohm & Voss P 135 - Asymmetric fast bomber
- Blohm & Voss P 138 - Long range reconnaissance flying boat
- Blohm & Voss P 139 - Flying boat
- Blohm & Voss P 140 - Passenger aircraft
- Blohm & Voss P 141 - Asymmetric passenger aircraft
- Blohm & Voss P 142 - Passenger aircraft w/rotating wing
- Blohm & Voss P 143 - Passenger aircraft w/rotating wing
- Blohm & Voss P 144 - Maritime patrol aircraft
- Blohm & Voss P 145 - Maritime twin float patrol aircraft
- Blohm & Voss P 146 - P.144 development for DLH
- Blohm & Voss P 147 - P.142 development for transport
- Blohm & Voss P 148 - Flying boat
- Blohm & Voss P 149 - Flying boat
- Blohm & Voss P 150 - Trans-atlantic flying boat w/pressurized cabin
- Blohm & Voss P 155 - Asymmetric dive bomber
- Blohm & Voss P 160 - Trans-atlantic flying boat
- Blohm & Voss P 161 - Land version of BV 238
- Blohm & Voss P 162 - Bomber
- Blohm & Voss P 163 - Bomber/heavy fighter
- Blohm & Voss P 164 - Asymmetric fast bomber
- Blohm & Voss P 165 - Asymmetric fast bomber
- Blohm & Voss P 166 - Fast bomber
- Blohm & Voss P 167 - Twin BV 250 land version
- Blohm & Voss P 168 - Asymmetric fighter/bomber
- Blohm & Voss P 170 - Fast bomber
- Blohm & Voss P 171 - Fast bomber
- Blohm & Voss P 172 - Dive bomber
- Blohm & Voss P 173 - Long-range bomber
- Blohm & Voss P 174 - Glider bomb
- Blohm & Voss P 175 - Parasite fighter
- Blohm & Voss P 176 - BV 237 armored version
- Blohm & Voss P 177 - Asymmetric jet fighter/bomber
- Blohm & Voss P 178 - Asymmetric jet fighter/bomber
- Blohm & Voss P 179 - Asymmetric fighter/bomber
- Blohm & Voss P 180 - Fighter/bomber w/rotating wing
- Blohm & Voss P 181 - Fighter/bomber
- Blohm & Voss P 182 - Fighter/bomber
- Blohm & Voss P 183 - Long range patrol aircraft
- Blohm & Voss P 184 - Long range patrol aircraft
- Blohm & Voss P 184.01 - long-range reconnaissance/bomber
- Blohm & Voss P 185 - Ground attack aircraft
- Blohm & Voss P 186 - Glider fighter
- Blohm & Voss P 187 - Land version of BV 222
- Blohm & Voss P 188 - Jet bomber w/compound swept wing
- Blohm & Voss P 190 - Single seat jet fighter
- Blohm & Voss P 191 - Flak suppression aircraft
- Blohm & Voss P 192 - Ground attack aircraft
- Blohm & Voss P 193 - Ground attack aircraft w/pusher propeller and variable-incidence wing
- Blohm & Voss P 194 - Asymmetric mixed propulsion ground attacker aircraft
- Blohm & Voss P 195 - High altitude fighter w/ turbo supercharger
- Blohm & Voss P 196 - Twin boom jet ground attack aircraft
- Blohm & Voss P 197 - Single seat jet fighter
- Blohm & Voss P 198 - High altitude jet fighter
- Blohm & Voss P 199 - High altitude jet fighter
- Blohm & Voss P 200 - Transatlantic passenger flying boat project developed from the BV 222
- Blohm & Voss P 201 - High altitude rocket powered interceptor
- Blohm & Voss P 202 - Slewed wing jet fighter
- Blohm & Voss P 203 - Night/heavy fighter w/ mixed propulsion
- Blohm & Voss P 204 - Asymmetric ground attack aircraft w/ mixed propulsion
- Blohm & Voss P 205 - BV 155 development
- Blohm & Voss P 206 - Long-range bomber
- Blohm & Voss P 207.02 - Fighter w/ pusher propeller
- Blohm & Voss P 207.03 - Fighter w/ pusher propeller
- Blohm & Voss P 208 - Tailless fighter w/pusher propeller
- Blohm & Voss P 209.01 - Tailless jet fighter
- Blohm & Voss P 209.02 - Single seat forward swept wing jet fighter
- Blohm & Voss P 210 - Tailless jet fighter, Volksjäger design candidate
- Blohm & Voss P 211.01 - Swept wing jet fighter
- Blohm & Voss P 211.02 - 1944 Volksjäger project submission, cancelled in favor of the He 162
- Blohm & Voss P 212 - Tailless jet fighter, Emergency Fighter Program design candidate
- Blohm & Voss P 213 - Pulse jet miniature fighter, Miniaturjäger design candidate
- Blohm & Voss P 214 - Piloted tailless flying bomb
- Blohm & Voss P 215 - Tailless, swept-wing jet night fighter
- Blohm & Voss Ae 607 - Jet-engined flying wing fighter

== BMW ==
(Bayerische Motoren-Werke GmbH)

- BMW Flugelrad
- BMW Strahlbomber I Swept wing tailless jet bomber (Reference: German Air Projects vol. 3 1935-1945, Marek Rys)
- BMW Strahlbomber II Swept wing tailless jet bomber (Reference: German Air Projects vol. 3 1935-1945, Marek Rys)
- BMW Schnellbomber I Swept wing turboprop bomber (Reference: German Air Projects vol. 3 1935-1945, Marek Rys)
- BMW Schnellbomber II forward swept wing turboprop bomber (Reference: German Air Projects vol. 3 1935-1945, Marek Rys)
- BMW Strahljäger I
- BMW Strahljäger II
- BMW Strahljäger III
- BMW Strahljäger IV

== Daimler-Benz ==
(Daimler-Benz)

- Daimler-Benz Trägerflugzeug - Giant carrier aircraft designed to carry either the Schnellbomber or SO Flugzeug, project (dubbed Projekt A and B by Nowarra 1993)
- Daimler-Benz Schnellbomber - parasite jet bomber (designs with twin-tail and V-tail configurations) carried by Trägerflugzeug.
- Daimler-Benz SO Flugzeug - parasite manned missile carried by Trägerflugzeug. Possible suicide craft as escape downwards near target nearly impossible at speed.
- Daimler-Benz DB Jäger - Fighter.

== Dornier ==
(Dornier Werke GmbH)

- Dornier Do 10 Test-bed fighter
- Dornier Do 13
- Dornier Do 19 four-engine heavy bomber, Ural bomber design candidate
- Dornier Do 29 proposed heavy fighter
- Dornier Do 214 Transport flying boat (project)
- Dornier Do 216
- Dornier Do 317 medium bomber, Bomber B candidate
- Dornier Do 335Z
- Dornier Do 435
- Dornier Do 535
- Dornier Do 635 (Junkers Ju 635) development of Dornier Do 335 project; also known as Do 335Z
- Dornier P.59
- Dornier P.174
- Dornier P.192
- Dornier P.231
- Dornier P.232
- Dornier P.237
- Dornier P.238 high-altitude version of Do 335
- Dornier P.247
- Dornier P.252
- Dornier P.254
- Dornier P.256

== DFS ==
(Deutsche Forschungsanstalt für Segelflug)

- DFS 39 - Lippisch-designed tailless research aircraft
- DFS 40 - Lippisch-designed tail-less research aircraft
- DFS 194 - Rocket-powered research aircraft, forerunner of Me 163
- DFS 228 - Rocket-powered reconnaissance aircraft (2 prototypes)
- DFS 332 - twin-fuselage experimental aircraft
- DFS 346 Supersonic research aircraft (incomplete prototype only)
- DFS Bombensegler - "bomb-carrying glider"
- DFS Eber ("Wild Boar") - Armed ramming interceptor

== Fieseler ==
(Gerhard Fieseler Werke GmbH)

- Fieseler Fi 157 unmanned anti-aircraft target drone
- Fieseler Fi 166 vertical-launched jet fighter
- Fieseler Fi 168 projected ground attack aircraft
- Fieseler Fi 333 prototype transport aircraft
- Fieseler Fi 356

== Flettner ==
(Flettner Flugzeugbau GmbH / Anton Flettner G.m.b.H.)

- Flettner Fl 184 night reconnaissance/ASW autogyro
- Flettner Fl 185 gyrodyne
- Flettner Fl 265 experimental helicopter
- Flettner Fl 339 Reconnaissance helicopter

== Focke-Achgelis ==
(Focke-Achgelis & Co. GmbH)

- Focke-Achgelis Fa 224 paper-only sports version of Focke-Wulf Fw 61
- Focke-Achgelis Fa 225 rotary wing assault glider prototype
- Focke-Achgelis Fa 269 tiltrotor VTOL aircraft
- Focke-Achgelis Fa 283
- Focke-Achgelis Fa 284 proposed heavy transport helicopter
- Focke-Achgelis Fa 325 Krabbe paper-only rotary wing transport
- Focke-Achgelis Fa 336 proposed powered version of Fa 330

== Focke-Wulf ==
(Focke-Wulf Flugzeugbau GmbH)

- Focke Rochen
- Focke-Wulf Fw 42 twin-engine medium bomber developed from the F 19
- Focke-Wulf Fw 57 heavy fighter-bomber prototype
- Focke-Wulf Ta 153
- Focke-Wulf Ta 154 Moskito night fighter prototype
- Focke-Wulf Ta 183 Huckebein (Entwurf V) - "Third-generation" jet fighter
- Focke-Wulf Fw 188 prototype reconnaissance aircraft
- Focke-Wulf Fw 191 Bomber B medium bomber program entry
- Focke-Wulf Fw 206 - planned twin-engine airliner
- Focke-Wulf Fw 238 long-range bomber (project)
- Focke-Wulf Fw 249 large transport aircraft (project); officially designated as Project 195
- Focke-Wulf Ta 254 proposed development of Ta 154
- Focke-Wulf Fw 261 very long-range maritime bomber; designation used in-house at Focke-Wulf and not an RLM designation
- Focke-Wulf Fw 300 proposed long-range airliner/transport/reconnaissance/ASW aircraft; a replacement for the Focke-Wulf Fw 200 Condor airliner
- Focke-Wulf Ta 400 six-engine, trans-Atlantic range Amerikabomber design competitor
- Focke-Wulf Fw 491 (Fw 391 development) (project)
- Focke-Wulf Strahlrohrjäger Ramjet-powered fighter, also known as "Ta 282"
- Focke-Wulf Mittelhuber (Entwurf III, incorrectly called "Fw 252")
- Focke-Wulf 1000x1000x1000 - series of bomber designs; also known as Fw 239
- Focke-Wulf Fighter Project 000-222-018
- Focke-Wulf Fighter Project with BMW 803 - fighter with connected twin-boom tail, slightly swept wings and pusher propellers (1941)
- Focke-Wulf Fighter Project with 2 BMW 801F
- Focke-Wulf Fighter Project 603s-001
- Focke-Wulf Project I (Entwurf I) - jet fighter design study
- Focke-Wulf Project II (Entwurf II, Nr. 264) - jet fighter design study
- Focke-Wulf Project III (Entwurf III) - jet fighter design study
- Focke-Wulf Project IV (Entwurf IV)
- Focke-Wulf Project VI Flitzer (Entwurf VI, Nr. 280)
- Focke-Wulf Project VII Peterle
- Focke-Wulf Project VIII Einmotoriges Jagdflugzeug mit PTL-Gerät 021 (Nr.281, erroneously called "Fw 281" in several sources)
- Focke-Wulf Night Fighter Project 011-45
- Focke-Wulf Night Fighter Project 011-46
- Focke-Wulf Night Fighter Project 011-47
- Focke-Wulf Night Fighter P.03.10251.13
- Focke-Wulf Project 82114
- Focke-Wulf P.03.1022 (Nr. 261, erroneously called "Fw 261" in several sources)
- Focke-Wulf P.03.10221.15 - large capacity strategic transport
- Focke-Wulf P.03.10224.20/21
- Focke-Wulf P.03.10224.30
- Focke-Wulf P.03.10025 - swept-wing, V-tailed fighter with pusher propellers (1944)
- Focke-Wulf P.03.10226.126
- Focke-Wulf P.03.10226.127
- Focke-Wulf P.03.10251 - series of night and all-weather jet fighters
- Focke-Wulf P.03.10252.102 (erroneously called "Fw 250" in some sources)
- Focke-Wulf Project Super-TL
- Focke-Wulf Super-Lorin
- Focke-Wulf Triebflügel
- Focke-Wulf Volksjäger 1
- Focke-Wulf Volksjäger 2
- Focke-Wulf Volksflugzeug

== Gotha ==
( Gothaer Waggonfabrik)

- Gotha Projekt P 35
- Gotha Projekt P 39
- Gotha Projekt P 40B
- Gotha Projekt P 45
- Gotha Projekt P 46
- Gotha Projekt P 47
- Gotha Projekt P 50/I
- Gotha Projekt P 50/II
- Gotha Projekt P 52
- Gotha Projekt P 53
- Gotha Projekt P 56
- Gotha Projekt P 58
- Gotha Projekt P 60
- Gotha Projekt P 3001
- Gotha Projekt P 3002
- Gotha Projekt P 8001
- Gotha Projekt P 9001
- Gotha Projekt P 9007
- Gotha Projekt P 10003
- Gotha Projekt P 11001
- Gotha Projekt P 12001
- Gotha Projekt P 14002
- Gotha Projekt P 14012
- Gotha Projekt P 16001
- Gotha Projekt P 17002
- Gotha Projekt P 20001
- Gotha Projekt P 21005
- Gotha Projekt P 35001

== Heinkel ==
(Ernst Heinkel A.G.)

- Heinkel He 119 Experimental reconnaissance bomber
- Heinkel He 176 Rocket-powered experimental aircraft (prototype), First manned liquid-fueled rocket aircraft to fly
- Heinkel He 177B first proposal for a four-engined version of the He 177A, three prototypes completed, at least two flown.
- Heinkel He 178 Jet-powered experimental aircraft, world's first turbojet-powered aircraft to fly (August 1939)
- Heinkel He 220 four-engine large flying boat; cancelled in favor of the Blohm & Voss BV 222
- Heinkel He 274 Four-engine high-altitude heavy bomber development of the He 177, two prototypes (of six ordered) completed by the French after war.
- Heinkel He 277 Paper-only four-engine Amerikabomber bomber development of the He 177, designated by February 1943, cancelled April 1944
- Heinkel He 280 First jet fighter.
- Heinkel P.1064
- Heinkel P.1065
- Heinkel P.1066
- Heinkel P.1068 - project number from DFS for Heinkel He 343 jet bomber
- Heinkel P.1055.01
- Heinkel P.1069
- Heinkel P.1070
- Heinkel P.1071
- Heinkel P.1072
- Heinkel P.1073.01
- Heinkel P.1073.02
- Heinkel P.1073.03
- Heinkel P.1073.04
- Heinkel P.1074
- Heinkel P.1075 (Do 535)
- Heinkel P.1076 single-engine high-speed fighter
- Heinkel P.1077 Julia projected single-seat interceptor, Emergency Fighter Program design candidate
- Heinkel P.1078 projected single-seat interceptor, Emergency Fighter Program design candidate
- Heinkel P.1079 paper-only all-weather jet fighter
- Heinkel P.1080 paper-only ramjet fighter
- Heinkel Wespe paper-only VTOL interceptor aircraft
- Heinkel Lerche paper-only annular-wing VTOL fighter/ground attack aircraft
- Heinkel Strabo 16

== Henschel ==
(Henschel Flugzeugwerke A.G.)

- Henschel Hs 127 bomber prototype
- Henschel Hs 130 high-altitude reconnaissance/bomber prototype
- Henschel Hs 132 jet-powered dive bomber
- Henschel Projekt P.54
- Henschel Projekt P.72
- Henschel Projekt P.75 canard-wing fighter
- Henschel Projekt P.76
- Henschel Projekt P.80
- Henschel Projekt P.87 canard-wing bomber
- Henschel Projekt P.90
- Henschel Projekt P.108
- Henschel Projekt P.122 tailless jet bomber
- Henschel Projekt P.135 tailless, compound swept wing jet bomber
- Henschel Projekt P. Transporter

== Horten ==
- Horten Ho 229 Experimental flying wing jet fighter-bomber prototype
- Horten H.XVIII proposed long-range flying wing jet bomber, Amerikabomber design candidate (Reference: German Air Projects vol. 3 1935-1945, Marek Rys)

== Hütter ==
(Ulrich Hütter and Wolfgang Hütter)

- Hütter Hü 136 Experimental dive bomber

== Junkers ==
(Junkers Flugzeug-Werke A.G.)

- Junkers Ju 85 parallel design of Ju 88; cancelled in favor of the Ju 88
- Junkers Ju 89 heavy bomber prototype, Ural bomber design candidate
- Junkers Ju 186 proposed four-engine high-altitude bomber
- Junkers Ju 187 projected dive bomber
- Junkers Ju 268 unmanned parasite fighter
- Junkers Ju 286 proposed six-engine high-altitude bomber
- Junkers Ju 287 projected dive bomber
- Junkers Ju 287 Heavy bomber (jet-engined) (prototype)
- Junkers Ju 288 Bomber B program favored contender (prototype)
- Junkers Ju 290 Long-range bomber (prototype)
- Junkers Ju 322 Mammut transport glider (prototype), 1941
- Junkers Ju 390 six engined Amerikabomber design competitor, derivative of the Ju 290 (two airworthy prototypes)
- Junkers Ju 488 proposed four-engine strategic bomber
- Junkers EFo 8 (Entwicklung Flugzeug)
- Junkers EFo 9 Hubjäger (German: "lift-fighter")
- Junkers High speed jet aircraft designed for record breaking speed
- Junkers EFo 11 Hubjäger (German: "lift-fighter")
- Junkers EFo 12
- Junkers EFo 15
- Junkers EFo 17
- Junkers EFo 18
- Junkers EFo 19
- Junkers EF 043
- Junkers EF 050 VTOL design study
- Junkers EF 061 pressurized high-altitude bomber prototype
- Junkers EF 072 early design for EF 077
- Junkers EF 073 Medium bomber developed into Ju 288
- Junkers EF 074 design designation of Ju 288
- Junkers EF 077 Airliner project developed into Ju 252
- Junkers EF 094 design designation of Ju 322
- Junkers EF 100 long-range reconnaissance/bomber developed from the EF 53
- Junkers EF 101 Mistel carrier design
- Junkers EF 109 twin-boom ground attack aircraft
- Junkers EF 110 ground attack aircraft
- Junkers EF 111 ground attack aircraft
- Junkers EF 112 twin-boom ground attack aircraft
- Junkers EF 115 projected bomber
- Junkers EF 116 projected W-wing jet bomber
- Junkers EF 122 four-engine development of Ju 287
- Junkers EF 125 two-engine development of Ju 287, precursor of EF 140
- Junkers EF 126 Lilli experimental pulsejet fighter, Miniaturjägerprogramm design candidate
- Junkers EF 127 Walli rocket-powered fighter, Emergency Fighter Program design candidate
- Junkers EF 128 tailless, swept-wing jet interceptor, Emergency Fighter Program design candidate
- Junkers EF 130 projected flying-wing bomber
- Junkers EF 131 six-engine development of Ju 287, test flown postwar in the Soviet Union
- Junkers EF 132 planned jet bomber
- Junkers EF 140 jet reconnaissance/bomber, completed postwar in the Soviet Union
- Junkers EF 150 jet bomber, Russian designed and completed postwar in the Soviet Union
- Junkers EF with BMW 801
- Junkers EF 2x Jumo 004

== Lippisch ==
- Lippisch Li 163S
- Lippisch P.01-111
- Lippisch P.01-119
- Lippisch P.03
- Lippisch P.04-107a
- Lippisch P.04-106
- Lippisch P.04-114
- Lippisch P.05
- Lippisch P.06
- Lippisch P.08
- Lippisch P.09 twinjet fighter
- Lippisch P.10 - flying-wing fighter; also known as Me 265
- Lippisch P.11 - proposed twinjet delta flying wing
- Lippisch P.12
- Lippisch P.13
- Lippisch P.13a - ramjet-powered interceptor
- Lippisch P.13b
- Lippisch P.14
- Lippisch P.15 - proposed turbojet fighter
- Lippisch P.20 - Me 163 development

== Messerschmitt ==
- Messerschmitt Bf 109TL jet fighter; intended as a stopgap if the Me 262 did not enter production
- Messerschmitt Bf 109Z two Bf 109F airframes joined together; developed in interceptor and fighter-bomber versions
- Messerschmitt Me 163 Komet first rocket-engined interceptor
- Messerschmitt Me 209 - Fighter (prototype); not related to the earlier Me 209 air speed record aircraft
- Messerschmitt Me 261 Adolfine - Long-range reconnaissance aircraft
- Messerschmitt Me 262 first jet fighter aircraft
- Messerschmitt Me 263 Scholle - interceptor (rocket-engined), also bore Junkers Ju 248 designation
- Messerschmitt Me 264 long-range strategic bomber, first-built Amerikabomber design competitor (3 airworthy prototypes)
- Messerschmitt Me 265 flying-wing heavy fighter design project; also known as Lippisch P.10; rejected in favor of the Me 410
- Messerschmitt Me 309 Tricycle undercarriage-equipped piston engined fighter (prototype)
- Messerschmitt Me 328 - pulsejet-powered fighter prototype developed from the P.1079
- Messerschmitt Me 329 - flying-wing heavy fighter/ground-attack design project
- Messerschmitt Me 334 - proposed tailless fighter with pusher propeller
- Messerschmitt Me 364 - six-engine version of Me 264; also known as Me 264/6m
- Messerschmitt Me 509 - all-metal fighter project
- Messerschmitt Me 609 - heavy fighter (project), two Me 309 fuselages joined together; also known as Me 309Z
- Messerschmitt P.08.01
- Messerschmitt P.1070
- Messerschmitt P.1073
- Messerschmitt P.1075 - project designation for Me 264/6m
- Messerschmitt P.1079 - series of pulsejet and ramjet-powered fighters
- Messerschmitt P.1085 - project designation for Me 264/6m
- Messerschmitt P.1090
- Messerschmitt P.1091 - project for a high-altitude fighter which later became the Blohm und Voss Bv 155
- Messerschmitt P.1092 - series of experimental aircraft
- Messerschmitt P.1095 - planned multirole aircraft using Me 262 and Me 309 components
- Messerschmitt P.1099 - proposed multirole jet fighter
- Messerschmitt P.1100 - proposed fast jet bomber
- Messerschmitt P.1101 - variable-sweep jet fighter designs
  - Messerschmitt P.1101/92 75mm BK 7.5 mounted jet bomber destroyer
  - Messerschmitt P.1101/97 tailless fighter with pusher propeller
  - Messerschmitt P.1101/99 55mm MK 114 mounted jet bomber destroyer
  - Messerschmitt P.1101/101 version with in-flight variable sweep wings
  - Messerschmitt P.1101/102 high-speed bomber/heavy fighter with non-variable sweep wing
  - Messerschmitt P.1101/103
  - Messerschmitt P.1101/104
  - Messerschmitt P.1101/105 four-engine Zerstorer
  - Messerschmitt P.1101-XVIII/108
- Messerschmitt P.1102
- Messerschmitt P.1102/105
- Messerschmitt P.1102B
- Messerschmitt P.1103 and P.1104 - series of rocket-powered interceptors
- Messerschmitt P.1106 - proposed jet fighter
- Messerschmitt P.1107/I - jet bomber project; would have been given the Me 462 designation
- Messerschmitt P.1107/II - improved P.1107/I
- Messerschmitt P.1107 (IX-122) - tailless variant of P.1107 with larger wing and redesigned landing gear
- Messerschmitt P.1108 - jet bomber design project
- Messerschmitt P.1110 - high-altitude interceptor design project
- Messerschmitt P.1111 - jet fighter/interceptor design project
- Messerschmitt P.1112 - proposed jet fighter

== Sack ==
- Sack AS-6

== Schempp-Hirth ==
- Göppingen Gö 8
- Göppingen Gö 9 Development aircraft for Do 335 Pfeil

== Škoda-Kauba ==
- Škoda-Kauba SK 257 fighter trainer.
- Škoda-Kauba SK P14 ramjet powered interceptor.

== Sombold ==
- Sombold So 344 Schußjäger

== Stöckel ==
- Stöckel Rammschussjäger (Ramshot Fighter) ramjet-rocket annular explosive warhead launcher aircraft project, 1944

== Weser ==
- Weserflug Bf 163
- Weserflug P.1003 - tilt-rotor aircraft project
- Weserflug P.2127 - twin-boom aircraft project
- Weserflug P.2130
- Weserflug P.2131
- Weserflug P.2136
- Weserflug P.2137
- Weserflug P.2138 - large flying boat project
- Weserflug P.2146
- Weserflug P.2147

== Zeppelin ==
- Fliegende Panzerfaust
- Zeppelin Rammer

== See also ==
- List of military aircraft of Germany
- List of military aircraft of Germany by manufacturer
- List of military aircraft of Germany during World War II
- RLM aircraft designation system
