= P87 =

P87 may refer to:

- Curtiss XP-87 Blackhawk, an American prototype fighter aircraft
- Henschel Projekt P.87, a proposed German bomber aircraft
- HMAS Ardent (P 87), a patrol boat of the Royal Australian Navy
- p87^{PIKAP}, phosphoinositide-3-kinase adapter protein of 87 kDa
- Papyrus 87, a biblical manuscript
- Serenade in D major, P. 87, by Michael Haydn
- WM P87, a sports prototype race car
- P87, a common term for Proto:87, a standard governing fine-scale model railroad tracks and wheels
- P87, state regional road in Latvia
