= Messerschmitt Me 334 =

German fighter project

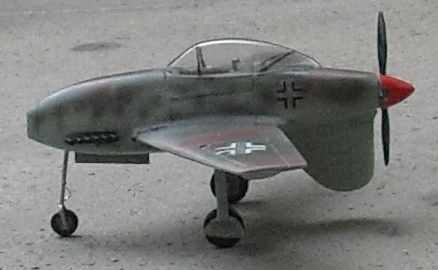
- Model of the Me 334

General information
- Type: Piston engine Fighter
- Manufacturer: Messerschmitt
- Designer: Alexander Lippisch

The Messerschmitt Me 334 was a proposed German piston-engined fighter, designed by Alexander Lippisch. No examples were built.

== Design and development ==
Alexander Lippisch was noted for designing tailless aircraft, with a certain amount of success. Along similar lines as the rocket-powered Me 163, Lippisch designed a tailless fighter to be powered by a Heinkel turbojet. The slow pace of development of reliable turbojets forced Lippisch to redesign the aircraft to be powered by a single Daimler-Benz DB 605 inverted V-12 piston engine, mounted in the nose and driving a pusher propeller at the rear of the fuselage pod, via an extension shaft.

The mid-mounted wings would have been swept back 23.4°, housing the skinny retractable main landing gear with elevons inboard and ailerons outboard on the trailing edge. Slots in the outboard leading edges would have improved slow speed performance and handling.

The intended armament of two 13 mm (0.512 in) MG 131 machine guns were to have been housed in the wing roots. Designated Me 334 by the Reichsluftfahrtministerium (RLM), development was abandoned by Lippisch with the advent of the Lippisch P.20.

== Specifications ==
Data from Geheimprojekte der Luftwaffe : Jagdflugzeuge 1939-1945

General characteristics

- Crew: one
- Length: 7 m (23 ft 0 in)
- Wingspan: 9.3 m (30 ft 6 in)
- Height: 3.72 m (12 ft 2 in)
- Wing area: 17.3 m^{2} (186 sq ft)
- Aspect ratio: 5
- Gross weight: 3,000 kg (6,614 lb)Powerplant
- Powerplant: 1 × Daimler-Benz DB 605 inverted V-12 liquid-cooled piston engine, 1,085 kW (1,455 hp)

Armament

- Guns: 2x 13 mm (0.51 in) MG 131 machine guns

== See also ==
Related lists

- List of German aircraft projects 1939-1945
