= Messerschmitt P.1107 =

German bomber project

P.1107

General information
- Type: Bomber, reconnaissance aircraft
- National origin: Germany
- Manufacturer: Messerschmitt
- Status: Abandoned
- Primary user: Luftwaffe (intended)
- Number built: 1 (incomplete)

History
- Introduction date: 1948 (planned)
- Developed from: Messerschmitt Me 264

The Messerschmitt P.1107 (also Me P.1107) was a jet-powered bomber project developed in the final years of the Second World War.

== Design and development ==
On January 25, 1945, Messerschmitt proposed the P.1107/I jet-powered bomber. The P.1107/I was designed using experiences from the company's earlier Me 264 bomber, and was to be powered by two BMW 018 turbojet engines mounted in pods under the wings, or four BMW 003D or Heinkel HeS 109-011 turbojet engines in twin-pods under the wings. The steel and duralumin fuselage was to have been taken from the Me 264, while the wings were to be constructed of wood. Landing gear was to consist of two large diameter main wheels which retracted into the fuselage and twin nose wheels, and the empennage was to have a high set tailplane. Fuel tanks were to be carried in the mid fuselage and wings. The pressurized, heated cabin would have housed the crew of four, as well as the radio and radar equipment. Offensive armament was to be a bomb load of 4,000 kg carried in the fuselage, no defensive armament was proposed. The P.1107/I was rejected by the RLM as it determined that it would not have enough speed or maximum altitude to reach the United States safely.

Later on, the design would be refined as the P.1107/II. This variant would have been of all metal construction, and powered by four Heinkel HeS 011 engines located in the wing roots. A V-tail was to have been fitted. The prototype of the P.1107/II was in the early stages of construction when the war ended.

Drawings exist of a third variant, labeled IX-122. This variant is depicted without a tailplane and with a much larger wing. The main landing gear was to retract into the wings, while the single nose wheel would have rotated 90 degrees before retracting backward under the cabin.

== Variants ==
P.1107/I (P.1107A)
Initial proposal. Metal fuselage and wooden wings, podded engines, and a T-tail. Bomber and reconnaissance variants were proposed.

P.1107/II (P.1107B)
Refined proposal. All-metal construction, engines buried in the wing roots, and a V-tail. Construction of the prototype was halted by the end of the war.

P.1107 (IX-122)
Tailless variant with a larger wing and redesigned landing gear.

Me 462
Proposed RLM designation for the P.1107.

== Specifications (P.1107/I as proposed) ==
Data from

General characteristics

- Crew: 4
- Length: 18.40 m (60 ft 4 in)
- Wingspan: 17.30 m (56 ft 9 in)
- Height: 4.96 m (16 ft 3 in) as bomber, 4.95 m (16 ft 2.5 in) as reconnaissance aircraft
- Wing area: 60 m^{2} (646 sq ft)
- Max takeoff weight: 29,000 kg (63,916 lb) as bomber, 29,400 kg (64,798) as reconnaissance aircraft
- Fuel capacity: 15,000 kg (33,060 lb) as bomber, 19,400 kg (42,758 lb) as reconnaissance aircraft
- Powerplant: 4 × BMW 003, Heinkel HeS 109-011 or 2x BMW 018 turbojet engines

Performance990–1,020 km/h (615–633 mph)

- Range: 7,400 km (4,595 mi, 3,993 nmi) as bomber, 9,600 km (5,962 mi) as reconnaissance aircraft
- Endurance: 8 hr 27 min as bomber, 11 hr 6 min as reconnaissance aircraft

Armament

- Bombs: 4,000 kg internal storage

== See also ==
Related development

- Messerschmitt Me 264

Aircraft of comparable role, configuration, and era

- Heinkel He 343
- Vickers Valiant
- Junkers Ju 287
- Arado Ar 234

Related lists

- List of aircraft of World War II
- List of bomber aircraft
- List of aircraft of Germany in World War II
- List of World War II jet aircraft
- List of German aircraft projects, 1939–45
