= Sombold So 344 =

Rocket powered german aircraft

So 344
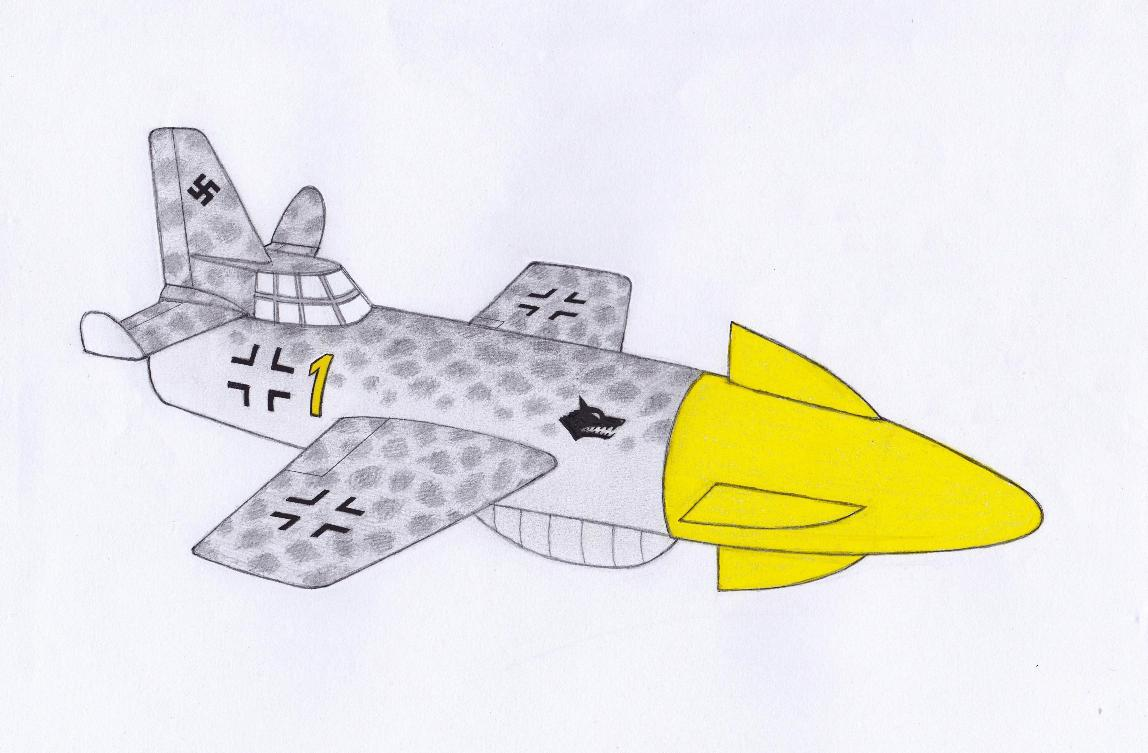

General information
- Type: Bomber box buster
- National origin: Germany
- Manufacturer: Sombold
- Primary user: Luftwaffe
- Number built: One 1/5 scale model built

The Sombold 344 Schußjäger (Shoot Fighter) was a rocket-powered aircraft designed in 1943/44 by engineer Heinz Sombold in Naumburg/Saale, Germany. The project came about when the Luftwaffe was seeking an emergency interceptor to combat the allied bombing raids over Nazi Germany in the last years of World War II.

== Description ==
The So 344 was originally intended as a parasite escort fighter armed with two MG 81 machine guns and one MK 108 cannon, but its original design was changed in January 1944. The second version of the aircraft retained the two machine guns, but its front section was a detachable explosive nose with stabilizing fins filled with 400 kg of explosives. The pilot sat in the cockpit near the tail which was in the back section. The plane proper had a wingspan of 5.7 m and a length of 5.3 m. Including the ejectable nose its length would be 7 m.

The plane would have been released from a mother plane upon reaching combat altitude. Then it would ignite its single Walter HWK 109-509 rocket engine and dive towards the enemy bomber fleet at a 45-degree angle. Shortly before contact it would release its explosive nose, equipped with a proximity fuze, into the center of the combat box formation in a way that it would damage as many bombers as possible. Then it would try to get away with the remaining fuel in its rocket engine and finally land on its fixed skid.

Owing to the extreme risks for the pilot inherent in the operation of this aircraft, the Sombold So 344 is sometimes listed as a suicide weapon. However, it was not intended as such, even though the chances of survival would have been very limited for the pilot of such a dangerous artifact.

A 1/5 scale model was built for aerodynamic tests, however the project was abandoned shortly before the end of the European conflict.

== See also ==
- Emergency Fighter Program

Aircraft of comparable role, configuration, and era

- Arado E.381
- Blohm & Voss P 214
- Fliegende Panzerfaust
- Focke-Wulf Volksjäger
- Zeppelin Rammer

Related lists

- List of German aircraft projects, 1939–45
- List of rocket aircraft
