= Focke-Wulf Project III =

Project III

General information
- Type: Fighter
- Manufacturer: Focke-Wulf
- Status: Abandoned design study

The Focke-Wulf Project III was a design study for a jet fighter, carried out in Germany in June 1943. It aimed to reduce the risk of foreign object damage to the engine that had been foreseen for the Project II, by relocating the engine from beneath the fuselage to a position atop the fuselage, with the jet intakes at the fuselage sides. In most other respects, it was similar to Project II, but as well as the engine relocation, Project II's conventional tail was replaced with twin tails on the ends of the horizontal stabiliser, in order to provide a path for the jet exhaust.

Project IV was to be virtually identical, but included a liquid-fuelled rocket booster on each side of the turbojet nacelle.

== See also ==
- Emergency Fighter Program
