= Blohm & Voss BV 950 =

BV 950
- Type: Glide torpedo
- Place of origin: Nazi Germany

Production history
- Designer: Richard Vogt
- Designed: From 1942
- Manufacturer: Blohm & Voss
- No. built: Several hundred
- Variants: See § Variants

Specifications
- Mass: 220 kg (490 lb)
- Length: 3.9 m (150 in)
- Wingspan: 2.5 m (98 in)
- Launch platform: L 10: Heinkel He 111, Junkers Ju 88; L 11: Arado Ar 234

The Blohm & Voss BV 950 was an anti-shipping air-launched glide torpedo developed in two variants, the L 10 Friedensengel and L 11 Schneewittchen. Although several hundreds were manufactured during development and trials conducted, neither type entered service.

== Design ==
The device comprised a small upper body with wings and tail, clamped on top of an air-launched torpedo.

In operation, it was dropped by an attacking aircraft from a safe altitude and distance, gliding down towards the target vessel and, as it approached the target, a timed fuse opened a small parachute which was attached to the glider body. It continued down and impacted the water a short distance from the target. When the torpedo met the surface of the water, the glider body automatically detached and was pulled back out of the way by the parachute, while the torpedo motor started and drove it to impact its target.

The L 10 was designed for a propeller powered aircraft cruising at around 310 km/h (190 mph; 170 kn). The L 11 was developed for launch aircraft speeds up to 500 km/h (310 mph; 270 kn).

== Variants ==
=== L 10 Friedensengel ===
Development of the L 10 Friedensengel (Angel of Peace) began in 1942. The main launch aircraft for the L 10 were the Heinkel He 111 and the Junkers Ju 88. The L 10 was put into production and many hundreds built, but was eventually cancelled before it could be used operationally.

=== L 11 Schneewittchen ===
The L 11 Schneewittchen (Snow White) was designed to be launched from the Arado Ar 234. This required a much higher airspeed than the L 10, so an additional braking parachute was deployed immediately after launch, to slow it down to its target approach speed. It had the same wing span as the L 10 but was shorter, at 3.43 metres (11.3 ft). The L 11 was also put into production but cancelled in December 1944. It was never used operationally.

== See also ==
- Blohm & Voss BV 143
- Blohm & Voss BV 246 Hagelkorn

Related lists

- List of German aircraft projects, 1939–45
