= Arado E.581-4 =

1944 German flying wing bomber project

General information
- Type: flying wing bomber project
- National origin: Germany
- Manufacturer: Arado Flugzeugwerke
- Number built: Not produced

The Arado E.581-4 was a German flying wing bomber project. It had three landing gears, and an unusually low fuselage.

== History ==
The aircraft was originally designed as the Arado E.555, and a scaled down version was designed in 1944, developing into this craft. Production was never completed, however, as it was dropped in favour of maximising production of existing designs.

== Specifications ==
General characteristics

- Length: 5.65 m (18 ft 6 in)
- Wingspan: 8.95 m (29 ft 4 in)
- Height: 2.6 m (8 ft 6 in)
- Powerplant: 1 × Heinkel HeS 011 turbojet engine

Performance Armament

- Guns: 2x 30mm MK 108 cannon
