= Focke-Wulf 1000x1000x1000 =

Twinjet bomber project for the Luftwaffe

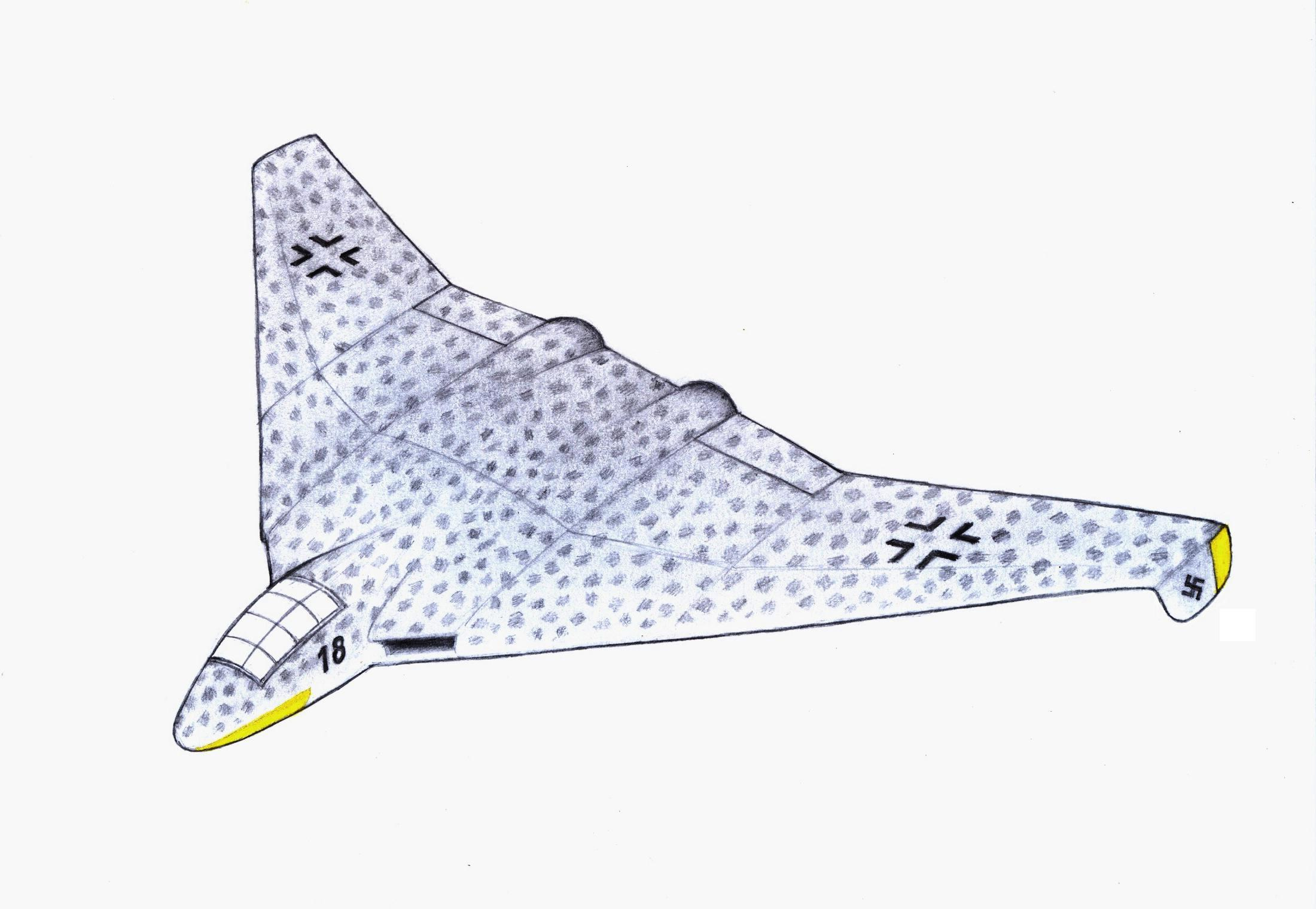
- Fw 1000x1000x1000 B

General information
- Type: Bomber
- Manufacturer: Focke-Wulf
- Designer: H. von Halem and D. Küchemann
- Status: Terminated by end of war
- Number built: None

The Focke-Wulf 1000x1000x1000, also known as Focke-Wulf Fw 239, was a twinjet bomber project for the Luftwaffe, designed by the Focke-Wulf aircraft manufacturing company during the last years of the Third Reich.

Their designation meant that these bombers would be able to carry a bomb that weighed 1000 kg for a distance of 1000 km at a speed of 1000 km/h.

== History ==
Focke-Wulf produced three different designs of the project that would have been powered by two Heinkel HeS 011 turbojet engines. The innovative-looking series of jet bombers was designed by H. von Halem and D. Küchemann. The project was cancelled because of the surrender of Nazi Germany.

== Variants ==
The Focke-Wulf 1000x1000x1000 project had three different variants. All of them were twin-jet bombers that would be powered by two Heinkel-Hirth He S 011 turbojets.

=== Fw 1000x1000x1000 A ===
Jet-powered bomber project that looked conventional. It had thin wings, swept back at 35 degrees.

Data from Herwig & Rode

General characteristics

- Crew: two
- Length: 14.2 m (46 ft 7 in)
- Wingspan: 12.65 m (41 ft 6 in)
- Height: 3.75 m (12 ft 4 in)
- Wing area: 27 m^{2} (290 sq ft)
- Empty weight: 8,100 kg (17,857 lb)
- Powerplant: 2 × Heinkel-Hirth He S 011 Turbojet engines, 13 kN (2,900 lbf) thrust each

Performance

- Maximum speed: 1,000 km/h (620 mph, 540 kn)
- Range: 2,500 km (1,600 mi, 1,300 nmi)
- Service ceiling: 13,500 m (44,300 ft)

Armament

- Guns: None
- Bombs: 1,000 kg (2,200 lb)

=== Fw 1000x1000x1000 B ===
A flying wing design with a small fuselage containing the cockpit and the front undercarriage wheel.

Data from Herwig & Rode

General characteristics

- Crew: one
- Length: 5.8 m (19 ft 0 in)
- Wingspan: 14 m (45 ft 11 in)
- Height: 2.75 m (9 ft 0 in)
- Wing area: 55 m^{2} (590 sq ft)
- Empty weight: 8,100 kg (17,857 lb)
- Powerplant: 2 × Heinkel-Hirth He S 011 Turbojet engines, 13 kN (2,900 lbf) thrust each

Performance

- Maximum speed: 1,060 km/h (660 mph, 570 kn)
- Range: 2,500 km (1,600 mi, 1,300 nmi)
- Service ceiling: 14,000 m (46,000 ft)

Armament

- Guns: None
- Bombs: 1,000 kg (2,200 lb)

=== Fw 1000x1000x1000 C ===
A twin jet bomber project with a crew of three quite similar to the Fw 1000x1000x1000 A with a wingspan of 12.65 m and a length of 14.2 m.

Data from Herwig & Rode

General characteristics

- Crew: three
- Length: 14.2 m (46 ft 7 in)
- Wingspan: 12.65 m (41 ft 6 in)
- Powerplant: 2 × Heinkel-Hirth He S 011 Turbojet engines, 13 kN (2,900 lbf) thrust each

Performance

- Maximum speed: 1,000 km/h (620 mph, 540 kn)
- Range: 2,500 km (1,600 mi, 1,300 nmi)

Armament

- Guns: None
- Bombs: 1,000 kg (2,200 lb)

== See also ==
Related lists

- List of German aircraft projects, 1939–45
- List of jet aircraft of World War II
