= Blohm & Voss P 204 =

P 204

General information
- Manufacturer: Blohm & Voss
- Designer: Richard Vogt
- Status: Design project

The Blohm & Voss P 204 was one of several design studies by Blohm & Voss for asymmetric dive bombers during World War II. It was also unusual in having hybrid propulsion comprising both piston and jet engines.

== Design ==
With the principle of asymmetric aircraft design proved in the BV 141, Chief Designer Richard Vogt sought to apply the principle to a replacement for the ageing Junkers Ju 87 Stuka or dive bomber and ground attack aircraft, producing a series of design proposals. The new jet engines had ground-breaking performance at high speeds, but performed worse than the long-established piston engines at low speeds and altitudes. The P 194 and later P 204 were attempts to gain the best of both worlds, by fitting both types of engine.

The layout was generally similar to a conventional single-propeller aeroplane, with a nose-mounted BMW 801 radial engine driving the propeller and the pilot sitting just ahead of the main wing.

But the wing was given a longer span on the port (left hand) side, with room beneath it for a nacelle containing a BMW 003 turbojet.

The root of the tail fin extended forward, with the tail plane mounted on top of the extension, raising it above the jet exhaust. The main undercarriage retracted outward into the main wing, on the port side outboard of the engine nacelle. A retractable tailwheel was located in the extreme rear, beneath the rudder.

The fuselage had an internal bomb bay, or could carry a BV 246 glide bomb externally. Provision was also made for two nose-mounted guns firing through the propeller and two more wing-mounted guns.

== Specification ==
Data from Masters (1982).

General characteristics

- Crew: 1
- Wingspan: 14.3 m (46 ft 11 in)
- Wing area: 33.7 m^{2} (363 sq ft)
- Gross weight: 8,500 kg (18,739 lb)
- Powerplant: 1 × BMW 801D radial, 1,070 kW (1,440 hp)
- Powerplant: 1 × BMW 003A turbojet, 7.8 kN (1,800 lbf) thrust (800 kg static thrust)

Performance

- Maximum speed: 760 km/h (470 mph, 410 kn) at 8,000 metres (26,000 ft)
- Combat range: 530 km (330 mi, 290 nmi)
