= Blohm & Voss BV 40 =

German glider fighter

BV 40
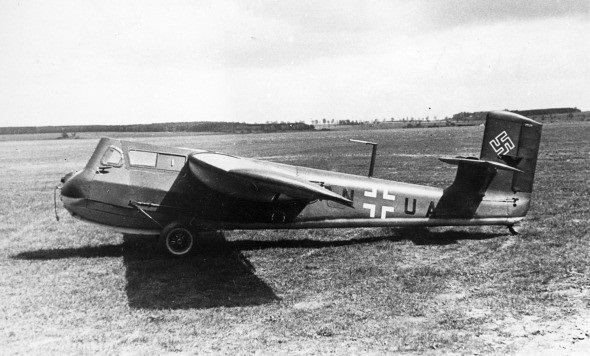
- Profile view of the first prototype

General information
- Type: Fighter glider
- Manufacturer: Blohm & Voss
- Number built: 6 prototypes completed

History
- First flight: 6 May 1944

The Blohm & Voss BV 40 was a prototype armoured German glider initially designed in mid-1943 by Blohm & Voss to attack Allied bomber formations during World War II. The BV 40 would be towed to high altitude by single-engined fighters and then ram the bombers while in a dive, but this concept was rejected before its first flight in May 1944 in favour of using its guns. The Luftwaffe had lost interest in the BV 40's original mission the month prior; development continued as its mission changed to attacking ships with specialised bombs. Blohm & Voss discovered that the prototypes were significantly overweight, and some of the armour and one gun had to be removed to conduct flight testing. The BV 40 was cancelled in August with only 6 gliders completed out of the 21 ordered. All of the aircraft were destroyed in an air raid in October.

== Design and description ==
Conceived in mid-1943 by Richard Vogt, chief designer and technical director of Blohm & Voss, the BV 40 was to be towed by a single-engined Messerschmitt Bf 109 fighter to high altitude and released above the Allied bombers' combat box. Once released, it would dive down at a sharp angle towards the enemy bombers and ram the vertical stabiliser of a bomber, causing it to crash, and thus also disrupting the close-flying bomber formation. The German Air Ministry (Reichsluftfahrtministerium) responded favourably to his proposal on 19 August and added a requirement for a single 30 mm (1.2 in) MK 108 cannon to neutralise the bomber's rear gunner. In order to minimise the aircraft's cross-section as a target for the gunner and improve the pilot's resistance to G-forces, he would lie in the prone position since a 1940 study using centrifuges had estimated an increase from 5Gs to 12Gs.

The German Aviation Research Institute (Deutsche Versuchsanstalt für Luftfahrt) had commissioned a small experimental aircraft, the Akaflieg Berlin B9, in 1942 to evaluate the engineering requirements of a powered aircraft with a prone pilot. Blohm & Voss engineers and pilots flew the aircraft in September 1943 to aid in the development of the BV 40. The following month, Vogt wrote to the Air Ministry stating that further studies had shown that attacking from the rear was infeasible due to the extreme altitude required to gain the necessary speed to overtake the bombers. He also stated: "In view of the psychological difficulties [of a ramming attack] and the need to put considerable weight into ram-proof wings, we would like to propose... refraining from intentional ramming for the time being and sticking to close range shooting attacks as the task."

A series of meetings in December with the Air Ministry and the Office of the Inspector of Fighters (Inspekteur der Jagdflieger) finalised the BV 40's configuration. The armament was increased to two MK 108 guns, which were moved from the initial position on the top of the fuselage to wing-root pods, and a Schlinge Device (Gerät Schlinge) was added. This was a 10-kilogram (22 lb) bomb towed behind the aircraft on a sharp 100–400-metre (330–1,310 ft) cable that was intended to be flown over an enemy bomber. Either the bomb would hit the bomber or the cable would snag it, potentially swinging the bomb into the bomber, and the cable would snap on impact.

The glider was designed to use non-strategic materials and to be built in as short a time as possible by non-skilled workers. It was of conventional layout, having a shoulder-mounted, straight, untapered wooden wing with a similarly-shaped tailplane mounted part way up the vertical stabiliser. The wing had a box spar at its leading edge and an auxiliary spar at the rear. The glider's flaps were usually lowered to an angle of 50° for landing, but could be further lowered to 80° if necessary. There was no conventional undercarriage as the aircraft was designed to use a one-axle trolley for take-off, to be dropped once the glider was airborne. A skid under the nose was lowered for landing.

The fuselage of the first prototype was built in three sections of which only the aft portion was built from wood. The center section was made from sheet steel 0.8 millimetres (0.031 in) thick, although the pilot's legs were protected by 8-millimetre-thick (0.31 in) steel plates. It could be jettisoned from the forward section to allow the pilot to bail out. The cockpit occupied the forward fuselage and was entirely formed from flat armour plates with some wooden fairings to reduce aerodynamic drag. Above the cockpit was the armoured canopy that was hinged at the rear. The thicknesses of the armour ranged from 8 millimetres at the front to 5 millimetres (0.20 in) at the rear. The sides of the canopy were fitted with sliding glass windows. Two 20-millimetre-thick (0.8 in) plates covered the front of the cockpit; the lower plate was vertical, but the upper plate angled backwards toward the pilot. The upper plate incorporated a windscreen of bulletproof glass 120 millimetres (4.7 in) thick. The sides consisted of 8-millimetre plates that included small glass windows that could be covered by sliding steel plates. Together with the windscreen, these gave the pilot a 35° view up and down and 20° from side to side. The floor of the cockpit consisted of a 5-millimetre plate. To reduce magnetic deviation from the armour plates, the compass protruded from the aircraft's nose and could only be viewed by the pilot via mirrors.

Each MK 108 gun was provided with 35 rounds. The guns were mounted on their sides and ammunition belts fed them from the top, with the cartridge cases ejected out bottom of the gun pods. The belts extended the length of the wing and were protected by narrow 8-millimetre armour plates. The gunsight was painted on the interior and exterior of the windscreen. As of 7 January 1944, Blohm & Voss was uncertain whether the Schlinge Device could be installed in the aft fuselage or would have to replace a gun pod.

== Development ==
Construction of six prototypes began in December 1943, designated V1–V6 (German: Versuchs, lit. 'Experimental'), including one airframe for stress testing to destruction, and another 15 prototypes were ordered on 15 February 1944. As production progressed, over-optimistic weight estimates were revealed during a meeting on 16 February and a drastic weight reduction program had to be implemented. Blohm & Voss informed the Air Ministry that the six gliders already begun would have to be lightened by 182 kilograms (401 lb) to allow flight testing to begin as scheduled. The changes included the substitution of wood for steel in the upper canopy and the sliding steel shutters, and ordinary glass for the bulletproof windscreen. One gun and its ammunition and armour would be deleted as would the leg armour.

At the same time, the specifications for the production BV 40s were also modified to save 144.5 kilograms (319 lb), bringing the gross weight down to approximately 1,000 kilograms (2,200 lb). All 8-millimetre plates were reduced to 6 millimetres (0.24 in) in thickness, and the middle fuselage section was to use wood rather than sheet steel. In addition the ammunition armour was to be deleted, lightening holes were to be drilled in most structural members and the skin of the wings and flight control surfaces were reduced in thickness. These changes compromised the glider's structural strength, which reduced its estimated safe diving speed to a maximum of 850 kilometres per hour (530 mph; 460 kn) above 4 kilometres (13,000 ft) and 700 kilometres per hour (430 mph; 380 kn) closer to the ground. Rocket propulsion was also considered, but was judged unsuitable.

The Office of the Inspector of Fighters had lost interest in the BV 40 programme by 20 April, but development work continued under the auspices of Bomber Group 200 (Kampfgeschwader 200 (KG 200)), the Luftwaffe's special operations force. The unit had decided to investigate the possibility of using manned glide bombs against Allied invasion shipping. Blohm & Voss' response was to substitute a pair of BT700 (Bombentorpedo) weapons for the gun pods, with the gliders to be carried aloft by Heinkel He 177 heavy bombers, one under each wing. The BT700s were bombs that were designed to be dropped short of the target and travel underwater before detonating. They had warheads that weighed either 320 or 330 kilograms (710 or 730 lb). While not strictly suicide weapons because the pilots could possibly pull up in time to avoid hitting their targets, the gliders would have nowhere to land and the armoured cockpits would sink very quickly.

The first prototype was completed in late April 1944 and made an unsuccessful attempt to get off the ground between 27 April and 2 May. A second attempt on 6 May was successful, but the V1 was badly damaged while landing on 2 June. V2 had been completed by this time and took over the majority of the flight testing beginning on 5 June that lasted until 26 July. The BV 40 made a total of 17 flights. The highest speed attained by any of the BV 40s was 470 kilometres per hour; 254 knots (292 mph), and it was thought to have the potential to go far faster.

Blohm & Voss lacked the resources to pursue the other variants of the BV 40 requested by KG 200 and was not able to build any gliders beyond those already ordered. The Air Ministry had grown disenchanted with the programme by late July and acceded to a request by Blohm & Voss to stop further work on the incomplete aircraft on 27 July. By this time V7 of the second batch was on track to be completed in August and construction had begun on V8 through V14 with deliveries scheduled through March 1945. The Luftwaffe formally cancelled the programme on 13 August. Blohm & Voss stored all of the BV 40s in a hangar at its airfield in Wenzendorf, but this was bombed by Consolidated B-24 Liberator heavy bombers on 6 October and destroyed.

== Specifications (BV 40) ==
Data from Die Deutsche Luftrüstung 1933–1945: Vol. 1: AEG-Dornier

General characteristics

- Crew: 1
- Length: 5.7 m (18 ft 8 in)
- Wingspan: 7.9 m (25 ft 11 in)
- Height: 1.63 m (5 ft 4 in)
- Wing area: 8.7 m^{2} (94 sq ft)
- Empty weight: 838 kg (1,847 lb)
- Gross weight: 952 kg (2,099 lb)

Performance

- Never exceed speed: 900 km/h (560 mph, 490 kn)
- Landing speed: 125 km/h (78 mph; 67 kn)

Armament

- Guns: 2 × fixed, forward-firing, 30 mm (1.2 in) Rheinmetall-Borsig MK 108 cannon with 35 rounds per gun

== See also ==
- Blohm & Voss BV 246
- Emergency Fighter Program

Related lists

- List of World War II military aircraft of Germany
- List of military aircraft of Germany

== Bibliography ==
- Ford, Roger (2013). Germany's Secret Weapons of World War II. London: Amber Books. ISBN 978-1-909160-56-9.
- Forsyth, Robert (2021). Luftwaffe Special Weapons 1942–45. Oxford: Osprey Publishing. ISBN 978-1-4728-3982-4.
- Green, William (1986) [1970]. The Warplanes of the Third Reich. New York: Galahad Books. ISBN 0-88365-666-3.
- Miranda, Justo (2017). Axis Suicide Squads: German and Japanese Secret Projects of the Second World War. Stroud, UK: Fonthill Media. ISBN 978-1-78155-565-1.
- Mrazek, James E. (2011) [1975, 1977]. Airborne Combat: The Glider War/Fighting Gliders of WWII. Mechanicsburg, Pennsylvania: Stackpole Books. ISBN 978-0-8117-4466-9.
- Nowarra, Heinz J. (1993). Die Deutsche Luftrüstung 1933–1945 [The German Air Force] (in German). Vol. 1: AEG-Dornier. Koblenz: Bernard & Graefe Verlag. ISBN 978-3-7637-5464-9.
- Sharp, Dan (2023). Secret Projects of the Luftwaffe. Horncastle, UK: Tempest. ISBN 978-1-911703-28-0.
