= Lippisch P.20 =

P.20
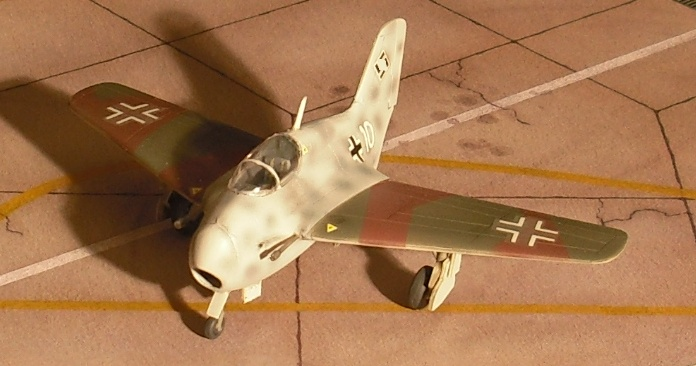
- Model of the Li P.20

General information
- Type: Fighter
- National origin: Germany
- Manufacturer: Lippisch
- Designer: Alexander Lippisch
- Status: Cancelled
- Number built: None

History
- Developed from: Me 163

The Lippisch P.20 was a proposed World War II German fighter aircraft. The P.20 design of April 1943 was an attempt to further develop the rocket-powered Me 163 interceptor into a turbojet-powered fighter. The design was the final one by Alexander Lippisch whilst working for the Messerschmitt company.

== Design and development ==
The aircraft was externally similar to the Me 163 upon which it was based, although the P.20 was in fact a new design sharing only a few parts with the Me 163. The fuselage was deepened accommodating a single Jumo 004 turbojet fed by a low mounted nose intake. The wings were modified in order to house the retractable landing gear and two heavy MK 103 autocannons in the wing roots. The C-Stoff fuel tanks would have replaced by ones for jet fuel. The cockpit was moved further aft and upwards leaving room for two MK 108 autocannons and the nose wheel. This had to turn 90 degrees to lie flat in order not to disrupt the air flow of the air intake.

As such the Lippisch P.20 was a new design, yet holding on to the overall concept of the Me 163 design which had resulted in a manoeuvrable and easy-to-fly (glider) aircraft. Maximum speed was calculated at well above 900 kmh with a flight endurance of 40 minutes.

== See also ==
- Lippisch P.15: A later attempt by Lippisch to similarly develop the Me 163. It was a result of Alexander Lippisch inspecting the new Heinkel He 162 Volksjäger aircraft and suggesting some changes. The result was a mix of a He 162 and the Me 163C.
- Focke-Wulf Volksjäger

== Bibliography ==
- Griehl, Manfred (1998). Jet Planes of the Third Reich, the Secret Projects. Vol. One. Sturbridge, Massachusetts: Monogram Publications. ISBN 0-914144-36-7.
