= Henschel P.87 =

Proposed German World War II bomber design

General information
- Type: Bomber
- Manufacturer: Henschel
- Number built: 0

The Henschel P.87 was a proposed single-engine Schnellbomber design put forth by German aircraft manufacturer Henschel for the Luftwaffe during WWII. It was to utilize the then rarely used tail-first canard arrangement, swept wings, and two vertical fins mounted on the wingtips.

== Design ==
In general, the P.87 was a single-engine, tail-first monoplane design. The unusual arrangement allowed for the crew to all be placed in the nose of the aircraft, ahead of the powerplant and propeller, which would have been novel for a propeller-driven aircraft of the time. The P.87 was to be powered by a single rear-mounted Daimler Benz DB 610 engine (the same type used on the Heinkel He 177 heavy bomber) in pusher configuration, driving a single or contra-rotating propeller. It featured an unconventional tail-first canard layout, with the tailplane being located towards the nose of the aircraft and the primary wings being at the rear of the fuselage, along with the vertical fins at the wings' tips. The mainplanes were swept at 30°. The landing gear was of tricycle configuration, with a nosewheel positioned directly below the crew and rear wheels retracting into the wing roots. Offensive armament would have most likely consisted of multiple 30mm MK 108 autocannon in the nose, with bombs either being carried directly underneath the fuselage and wings, or in an internal bomb bay.

== Cancellation ==
The P.87 was theoretically a sound design, but a combination of a lack of experience among German pilots in flying pusher-configuration aircraft, and the unconventional and relatively untested layout, led to the whole project being dropped to focus on higher priorities. No mock-up or prototype was constructed, and no RLM number was designated, with only paper design work ever being done.

== Specifications ==
General characteristics

- Crew: 3-4
- Length: 12.15 m (39 ft 10.7 in)
- Wingspan: 14 m (45 ft 11.25 in)
- Wing area: 31.7 m² (341.216 sq ft)
- Height: 2.8 m (9 ft 2.28 in)
- Empty weight: 7,000 kg (15,432 lbs)
- Max takeoff weight: 9,000 kg (19,842 lbs)
- Powerplant: 1 × Daimler Benz DB 610 24-cylinder liquid-cooled inverted vee piston engine, producing 2,218 kW (2,975 hp)

Performance

- Maximum speed: 750 km/h (466 mph)
- Range: 800 km (497 miles)
- Service ceiling: 10,000 m (32,808 ft)
- Rate of climb: 671 m/min (2,200 ft/min)

Armament

- Guns: Likely 2 or 4 × 30mm (1.181 in) MK 108 cannon in the nose, 650 rounds/minute each
- Bombs: Unknown, would be carried externally and/or internally

== See also ==
Aircraft of comparable role, configuration, and era

- Curtiss-Wright XP-55 Ascender
- Kyushu J7W Shinden
- Dornier Do 335
- Dornier Do 17
- Junkers Ju 88
- De Havilland Mosquito

Related development

- Schnellbomber

Related lists

- List of military aircraft of Germany
- List of German aircraft projects, 1939–45
