= Blohm & Voss BV 143 =

Aerial bomb

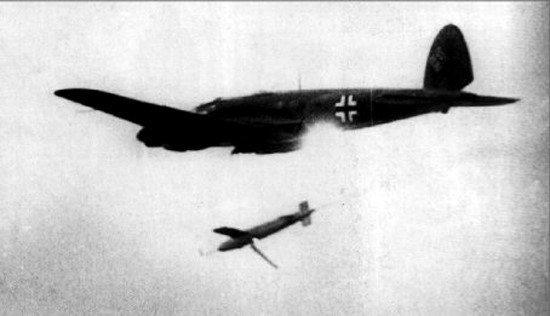
- A He 111 coastal bomber drops a BV 143A during a 1941 test. Note the ventral altitude probe.
- Type: Experimental anti-shipping glide bomb
- Place of origin: Nazi Germany

Service history
- Used by: Nazi Germany (Luftwaffe)
- Wars: World War II

Production history
- Designer: Blohm & Voss
- Designed: 1939
- No. built: 157
- Variants: BV 143A, BV 143B

Specifications
- Mass: 1,073 kg (2,366 lb)
- Length: 5.98 m (19.6 ft)
- Wingspan: 3.13 m (10.3 ft)
- Warhead weight: 500 kg (1,100 lb)
- Engine: Walter HWK 109-501; 9.8 kN static thrust
- Propellant: Launch and Midcourse: glider Terminal: solid rocket engine
- Flight altitude: 2 m (6 ft 7 in)
- Guidance system: Gyroscopic autopilot; instrumented feeler probe, radar altimeter.
- Launch platform: He 111

The Blohm & Voss BV 143 was an early prototype rocket-assisted glide bomb developed by the German Luftwaffe during World War II.

== Design ==
Blohm & Voss designers began to consider airborne missiles late in 1938, even before the outbreak of war. First of these to be developed was the BV 143, a glide bomb with rocket booster. Trials began in 1939.

By 1941, Allied merchant ships were slow and easy targets for German coastal bombers, but were proving increasingly well-equipped with anti-aircraft artillery, making short-range attacks prohibitively costly. Interest was raised in the development of a stand off weapon to engage unarmored merchant ships from beyond the range of the Bofors 40 mm gun. The BV 143 was one of several standoff bomb and missile designs researched by the Blohm & Voss Naval Engineering Works for this anti-shipping role.

The BV 143 was designed to be air-dropped from beyond the range of antiaircraft guns, glide towards the target, engage its solid rocket motor below the line of fire of guns, and commence a short (30 second, maximum) high speed dash to the target, striking 2 metres (6 ft 7 in) above the waterline. The first design, with straight wings and cross-like tail, featured a 2-metre instrumented "feeler probe" suspended from the body, designed to start the rocket on contacting the sea surface. A pitch-only autopilot then maintained the bomb at the 2 metre probe length until striking the target. The first working prototypes of this design were completed in February 1941. Tests during 1943 showed the probe-based design to be unworkable and after additional design time it was replaced with a radio altimeter, which although being less fragile also ultimately proved unsatisfactory.

The bomb proved consistently unable to reliably maintain altitude stability with either design, with rocket misfires and failures also proving troublesome. After building and testing 157 examples, the project was eventually abandoned in favor of the Henschel Hs 293.

== Ship-to-ship variant ==
BV 143B (Schiff-Schiff-Lenkflugkörper) was a late ship-to-ship variant of the BV 143 package. It was designed to launch the missile with an aircraft catapult. Only one test was ever conducted before the program was abandoned.

== See also ==
- Blohm & Voss BV 246 Hagelkorn
- Blohm & Voss BV 950
- Henschel Hs 293
- Glide bomb
- Anti-shipping missile
- Stand-off missile
