= Focke-Wulf Ta 153 =

Prototype German fighter aircraft

Ta 153

General information
- Type: Interceptor aircraft
- National origin: Nazi Germany
- Manufacturer: Focke-Wulf
- Designer: Kurt Tank
- Number built: 0

History
- Developed from: Focke-Wulf Fw 190
- Developed into: Focke-Wulf Ta 152

The Focke-Wulf Ta 153 (GH+KV) was a prototype German fighter aircraft built during World War II. It was a development of the Fw 190C, a Fw 190A with a DB 603A engine.

A project called Ra-4 was initiated in 1943. The idea was to create a new fighter derived from the Fw 190 for higher altitudes. In that sense it was a competitor for the Messerschmitt Me 155B project. The Ta 153A-1 would get the Jumo 213A or C engine and the new wings of the Fw 190B prototype. There was also the Ta 153D-1, a high-altitude version with long-span, high-aspect ratio wings and the DB 603G engine.

Although derived from the Fw 190, the Ta 153 was essentially a new aircraft. This would have required a complete conversion of the production lines with new jigs and tooling. For that reason Kurt Tank decided to modify the existing Fw 190A by adding a rear fuselage 'plug', thereby creating the Fw 190D. Later this fuselage was mated with the long wings of the Ta 153D-1 for the successful Ta 152H.

== Specifications (Ta 153) ==
Data from

General characteristics

- Crew: 1
- Length: 10.4 m (34 ft 1 in)
- Wingspan: 11 m (36 ft 1 in)
- Height: 3.4 m (11 ft 2 in)
- Wing area: 18.2 m^{2} (196 sq ft)
- Empty weight: 3,600 kg (7,937 lb)
- Gross weight: 4,400 kg (9,700 lb)
- Max takeoff weight: 5,100 kg (11,244 lb)
- Powerplant: 1 × Junkers Jumo 213 V-12 inverted liquid-cooled piston engine, 1,305 kW (1,750 hp)
- Propellers: 3-bladed constant-speed propeller

Performance

- Maximum speed: 680 km/h (420 mph, 370 kn)
- Range: 1,400 km (870 mi, 760 nmi)
- Service ceiling: 11,000 m (36,000 ft)
- Wing loading: 242 kg/m^{2} (50 lb/sq ft)
- Power/mass: 0.30 kW/kg (0.18 hp/lb)

Armament

- Guns:

- 1 × 30 mm (1.18 in) MK 108 cannon with 90 rounds
- 2 × 20 mm MG 151 cannon with 175 rpg

== See also ==
Related development

- Focke-Wulf Fw 190
- Focke-Wulf Ta 152

Related lists

- List of German aircraft projects, 1939–45
- List of military aircraft of Germany
- List of World War II military aircraft of Germany
