= Heinkel P.1073 =

German WWII fighter aircraft project

He P.1073
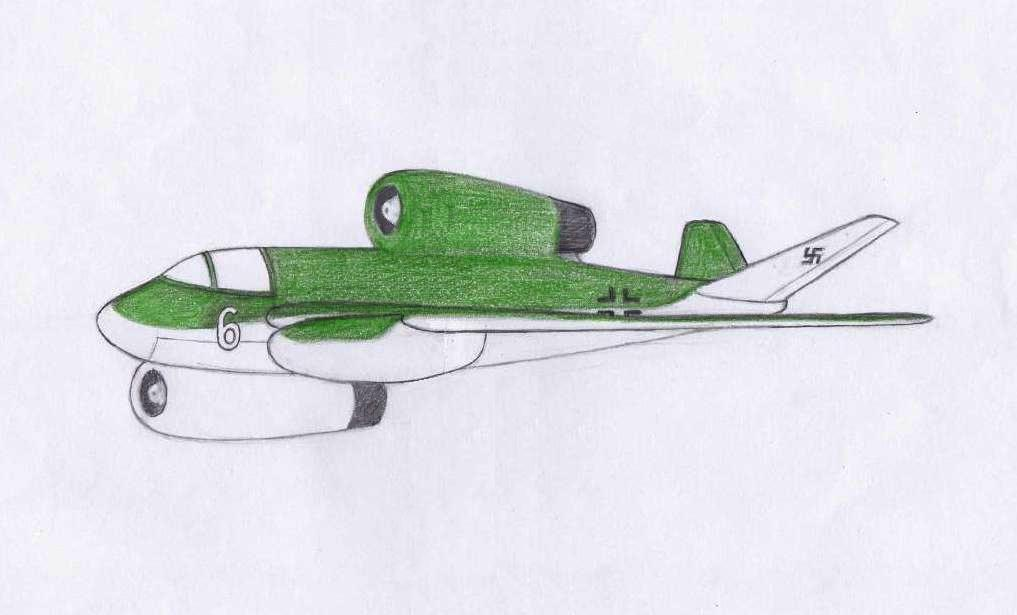
- He P.1073 01

General information
- Type: Fighter
- Manufacturer: Heinkel
- Status: Never went past the project stage
- Primary user: Luftwaffe
- Number built: 0

History
- Developed into: Heinkel He 162

The Heinkel P.1073 (He P.1073), known also as Strahljäger (Jet fighter), was a fighter project developed for the Luftwaffe by Heinkel aircraft manufacturing company during the last years of World War II.

== Development ==
In 1944 Heinkel produced different designs of the project using either two Heinkel HeS 011 or two BMW 003 axial-flow turbojets. One of the turbojets was placed on top of the fuselage and the other in a ventral position. The engine below the fuselage was placed asymmetrically in order to provide space for the retractable front undercarriage wheel. The designs of this aircraft would be used by Heinkel to develop the He 162 Volksjäger, which used only one turbojet engine, towards the end of 1944.

== Variants ==
Heinkel produced twenty variants of the project between July 6 and October 3, 1944. All variants would have been armed with two 30 mm MK 108 cannons.

=== He P.1073 01 4 ===
This was the original design of the jet-powered fighter project. It had a v-tail and swept wings fitted with a streamlined 500 liter fuel tank on each wing.

=== He P.1073 01 8 ===
Project for a high-altitude reconnaissance aircraft. It was also a slightly asymmetric jet-powered plane like the earlier design, but with the cockpit located at the front end of the fuselage. The design included an alternative version with a high aspect ratio upswept wing.

=== He P. 1073 02 ===
A variant with forward-swept wing.

== Specifications ==
General characteristics

- Crew: one
- Length: 10.32 m (33 ft 10 in)
- Wingspan: 12 m (39 ft 4 in)
- Height: 3.40 m (11 ft 2 in)
- Wing area: 22 m^{2} (240 sq ft)
- Powerplant: 2 × BMW 003 Turbojets

Performance Armament

- Guns: 2 X 30mm MK 108 cannon

== See also ==
Aircraft of comparable role, configuration, and era

- Heinkel He 162

Related lists

- List of German aircraft projects, 1939–45
- List of World War II military aircraft of Germany
- List of World War II jet aircraft
