= Blohm & Voss P 214 =

P 214

General information
- Type: Single-seat dive bomber
- National origin: Nazi Germany
- Manufacturer: Blohm & Voss
- Designer: Richard Vogt
- Status: Design project

The Blohm & Voss P 214 was a small manned interceptor project described as a Bemannte Fla. Bombe (Fla. standing for Flugabwehr), meaning "Manned Air Defence Bomb". It was studied late in 1944 but not developed past the project stage.

No design description or drawing of the airframe is known to exist, and contemporary knowledge of it comes only from a few pages of operational discussion and performance graphs. Even the type of propulsion is not known.

== Misidentifications ==
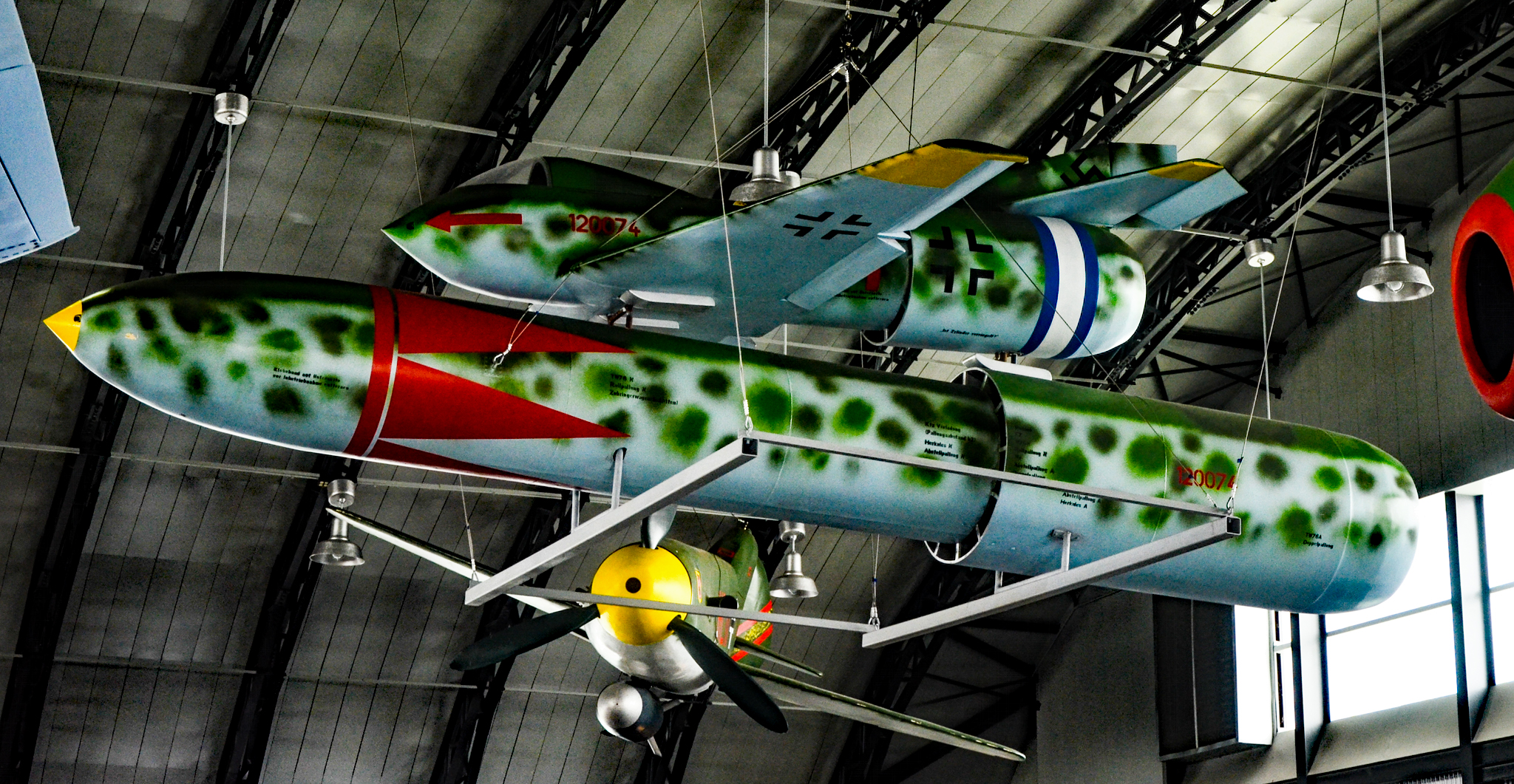

The P 214 has in the past been misidentified as the MGRP composite design proposed by Karl Stöckel at the DVL. An exhibit displayed at the Military Aviation Museum in Virginia Beach, Virginia is claimed to be a replica.

Other authors have stated that it was one of the series of outboard-tail "batwing" projects studied by B&V during 1944-45.

== Specifications ==
Data from

General characteristics

- Crew: 1
- Wingspan: 7 m (23 ft 0 in)
- Wing area: 10 m^{2} (110 sq ft)
- Aspect ratio: 4.9
- Empty weight: 1,900 kg (4,189 lb)
- Gross weight: 3,600 kg (7,937 lb)

== See also ==
- Emergency Fighter Program

Aircraft of comparable role, configuration, and era

- Fliegende Panzerfaust
- Sombold So 344

Related lists

- List of German aircraft projects, 1939–45
- List of rocket aircraft
