= Focke-Wulf Project VIII =

Design study for a turboprop-powered fighter-bomber

Peterle

General information
- Type: Fighter
- Manufacturer: Focke-Wulf
- Status: Abandoned design study

The Focke-Wulf Peterle was a design study for a turboprop-powered fighter-bomber, undertaken in Germany during World War II.

== Development ==
It was based on the work previously done on Focke-Wulf Flitzer. The Peterle, known in Focke-Wulf documents as Einmotoriges Jagdflugzeug mit PTL-Gerät 021 was for an aircraft very similar in shape. The performance was calculated to be much better, but the unswept tail surfaces were predicted to cause problems at high speed, and the project was abandoned.

Some sources refer to this design as the Fw 281, but this is a fictitious designation derived from project label Baubeschreibung Nr. 281 for the Einmotoriges Jagdflugzeug mit PTL-Gerät 021.

== Specifications (as designed) ==
General characteristics

- Crew: one pilot
- Length: 9.00 m (29 ft 6 in)
- Wingspan: 8.00 m (26 ft 2 in)
- Height: 2.65 m (8 ft 8 in)
- Wing area: 17.0 m^{2} (183 sq ft)
- Empty weight: 3,585 kg (7,903 lb)
- Gross weight: 5,000 kg (11,022 lb)
- Powerplant: 1 × Daimler-Benz DB 109-021 turboprop , 1,491 kW (2,000 hp)

Performance

- Maximum speed: 910 km/h (565 mph, 491 kn)
- Range: 1,460 km (907 mi, 788 nmi)

Armament

- 4 × 20 mm MG 213 cannon

== See also ==
- Emergency Fighter Program
