= Blohm & Voss BV 246 =

Aerial bomb

BV 246
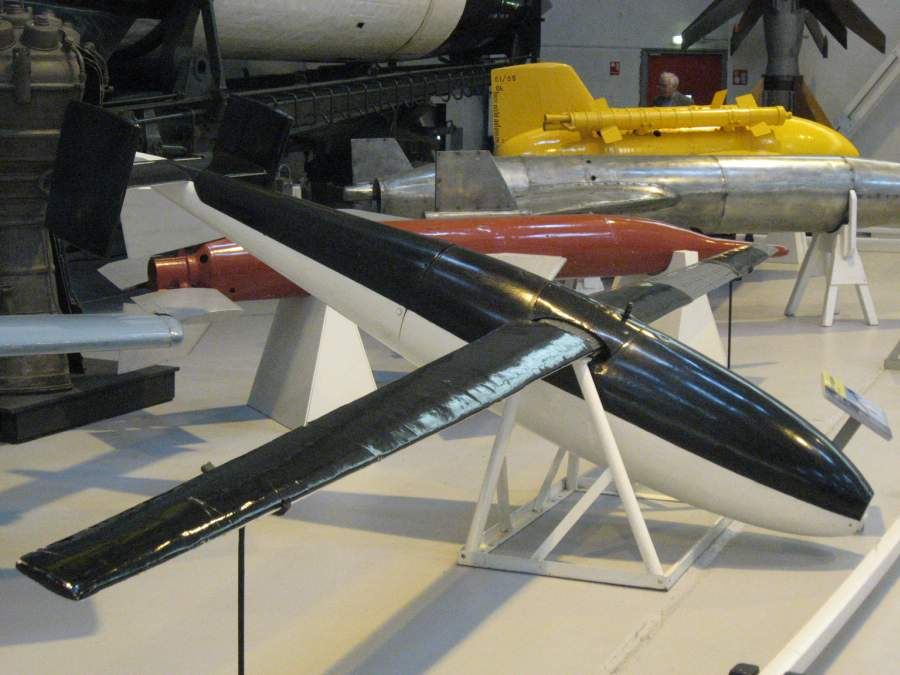
- A Blohm & Voss BV 246 glider bomb at RAF Museum, Cosford
- Type: Air-to-surface guided bomb
- Place of origin: Germany

Production history
- Designer: Richard Vogt
- Designed: 1943
- Manufacturer: Blohm & Voss

Specifications
- Mass: 730 kg (1,600 lb)
- Length: 3.53 m (11.6 ft)
- Wingspan: 6.4 m (21 ft)
- Warhead weight: 435 kg (960 lb)
- Operational range: 210 km (130 mi)
- Guidance system: Radar seeker (later anti radiation missile version)
- Launch platform: Junkers Ju 88 or Heinkel He 111

The Blohm & Voss BV 246 Hagelkorn (German language: "Hailstone") was a radar guided glide bomb developed to bomb specific targets (bridges, ships, etc.) once it was released.

== History ==
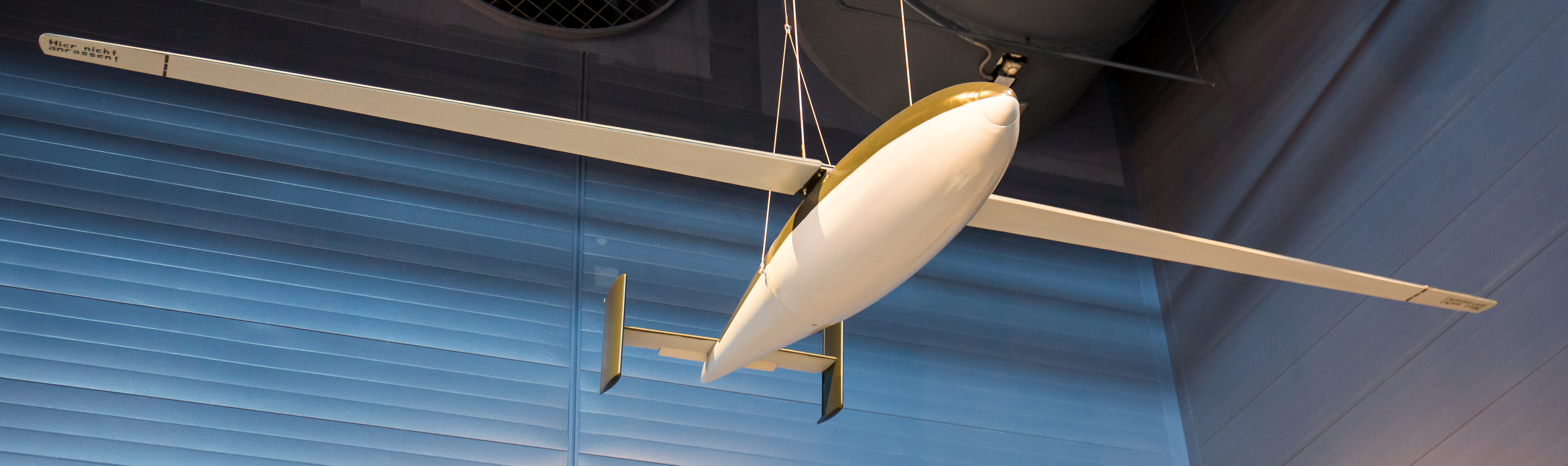
A Bv 246B on display at the Udvar-Hazy Center.

This glider was designed by Richard Vogt, at first under the designation of BV 226, which was later changed to its definitive designation BV 246 on December 12, 1943.

It was intended to be dropped from a Junkers Ju 88 or a Heinkel He 111 bomber, either of which could carry three of the weapons, and was to be dropped from a height of 7,000 m (23,000 ft) at a speed of 550 km/h (340 mph), giving it a range of up to 210 km (130 mi). In a slight dive the Bv 226 could reach a speed of 900 km/h (560 mph).

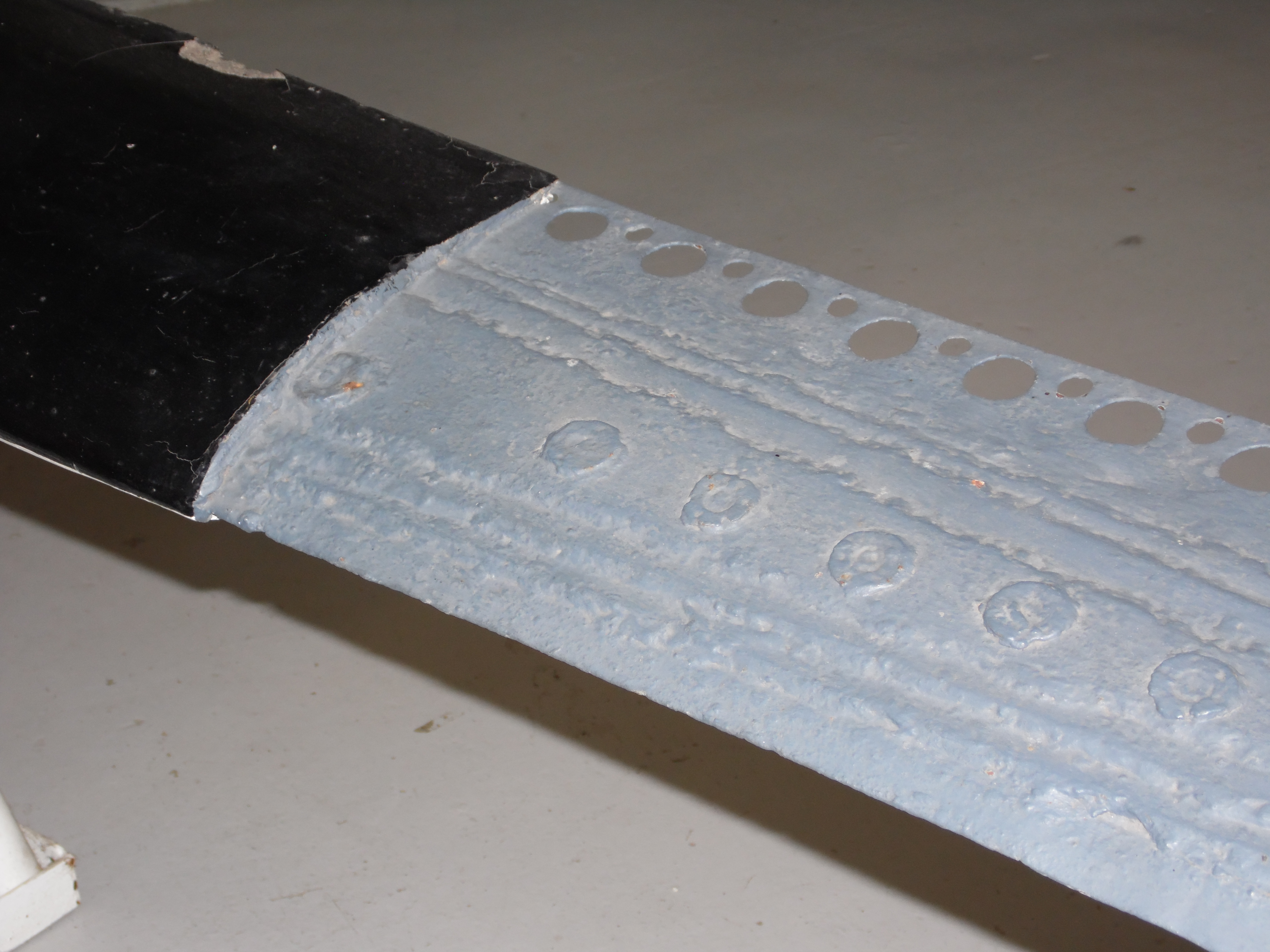
Wing, showing the steel spar beneath the cement casing

The construction of the BV 246 avoided the usual aircraft techniques and strategic materials, so it could be mass-produced. It had clean aerodynamics, with high aspect ratio wings that made possible a glide ratio of 25:1. The wings were made of magnesite cement, formed around a steel spar. It had a cruciform tail in an early version and a double vertical tail mounted on the sides of a wide horizontal stabilizer in a later version. It had a length of 3.53 m (11.6 ft) and a wingspan of 6.4 m (21 ft). Its total weight was 730 kg (1,610 lb), of which 435 kg (959 lb) was the explosive warhead.

Initial tests revealed that the basic design was workable, but that the weapon was very inaccurate and because of this it was rejected. However, work was restarted in 1943, with 11 different versions being planned, due to its simple and inexpensive construction, and the new development contract was awarded to the Karlshagen test centre. A series of tests was begun to improve the weapon's accuracy, with air drops performed by KG 101. Despite unpromising results, the Ministry of Aviation nevertheless issued the order to commence mass production on 12 December 1943. In February 1944 the contract was cancelled due to the success of the V-1 flying bomb.

The weapon was revived a further time, in early 1945, as an early form of anti-radiation weapon, using the Radieschen passive seeker which was designed to home in on Allied radar transmitters; around 1,000 units were produced but never used operationally.

== See also ==
- Azon
- ASM-N-2 Bat WW II autonomous radar-guidance glide bomb (U.S. Navy)
- Blohm & Voss BV 143
- Blohm & Voss BV 950
- GB-4
- GB-8
- Fritz X
- Felix
- Blohm & Voss BV 40 glider interceptor
