= Heinkel He 343 =

German quadjet bomber

He 343
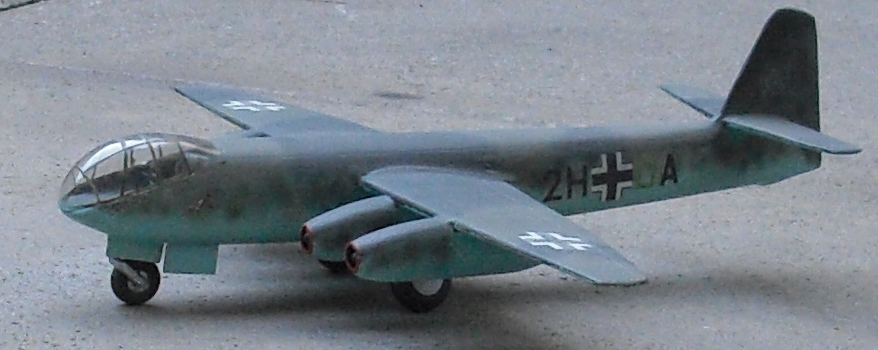
- He 343 model

General information
- Type: Bomber
- Manufacturer: Heinkel
- Status: Terminated prior to flight
- Primary user: Luftwaffe
- Number built: None completed

The Heinkel He 343 was a quadjet bomber project designed by the German aircraft manufacturer Ernst Heinkel Flugzeugwerke during the final years of the Second World War. It was intended to perform aerial reconnaissance and fighter-bomber operations in addition to its use as a fast bomber.

The project commenced work in January 1944 as a new jet-powered bomber that emphasised flexibility in terms of mission role and engine fitout. Munitions were to be carried both externally and internally. Four variants of the He 343 were envisioned to perform bombing, reconnaissance, and direct fire support roles. The Government Air Ministry (Reichsluftfahrtministerium) quickly issued an initial order for 20 aircraft, which Heinkel worked on fulfilling. Despite lobbying efforts by the company's founder, Ernst Heinkel, to maintain the project, during late 1944, work was halted on the project and the order cancelled on account of Germany's deteriorating military situation necessitating the diversion of limited resources towards other programmes closer to production. Both design information and many of the components were recovered from Heinkel by the Soviet Union near the end of the conflict. The He 343 was allegedly studied in great detail by the Soviets and played a crucial role in the development of the Ilyushin Il-22, the first Soviet jet-bomber.

== Design and development ==
Work on what would become the He 343 commenced during January 1944. That same month, the German aircraft manufacturers Heinkel and Junkers were both personally approached by Siegfried Knemeyer, the Head of Technical Development at the Government Air Ministry (Reichsluftfahrtministerium), with a request to develop a four-engined jet-powered bomber as a "crash" programme with a short development window of roughly one year. By that point, Heinkel had already played a key role in pioneering jet propulsion during the 1930s, and was keen to develop combat-ready jet-powered aircraft that would be procured in large numbers to meet the wartime needs of the Luftwaffe.

Accepting this request, Heinkel quickly designed a four-engined bomber with unswept wings that were attached at the center of the fuselage. It was to be operated by a crew of two, who were seated within a pressurised glazed cockpit at the front of the aircraft; an optional third crew member may have also been carried for some mission roles. The engines, which were individually mounted beneath the wings, could alternatively be Junkers Jumo 004, BMW 003, or Heinkel HeS 011 powerplants. Armaments and/or equipment were to be carried both internally and externally; while up to 2,000 kg of bombs could be accommodated within the bomb bay, the bomb racks underneath the wings would have provided additional mounting points. Defensive armaments include a pair of fixed rear-facing MG 151 20mm cannons, which were installed within the fuselage.

Operationally, it was to be faster than previous peers as to better evade interception, and flexible enough to perform alternative roles such as aerial reconnaissance and fighter-bomber duties; pursuing compatibility with multiple turbojet engines also reduced some of the potential manufacturing difficulties. To shorten its development, considerable attention was paid to the existing Arado Ar 234 jet bomber; to this end, design information was supplied by Arado and the Deutsche Forschungsanstalt für Segelflug (DFS) to Heinkel.

From at early stage, four distinct models of the aircraft were planned. The He 343 A-1 was a dedicated bomber variant. Amongst the munitions it was intended to carry was the Fritz X guided Anti-ship glide bomb, which would have been radio controlled from the aircraft by a third crew member. The He 343 A-1 was very similar to the He 343 A-2, the variant intended for reconnaissance missions. For extended endurance, an additional 2,400 kg of fuel could be carried in an additional tank in the bomb bay instead of munitions; a pair of Rb 75/30 cameras would have been used for photo reconnaissance. The He 343 A-3 was envisioned for battlefield support, being armed with a pair of MG 151 20mm cannons in addition to four forward-firing MK 103 30mm cannons mounted with its bomb bay. The He 343 B-1 also performed the same role as the He 343 A-3, differing in terms of the armament used, having an upgraded rear turret arrangement that necessitated the redesign of the tail unit.

The Air Ministry reviewed Heinkel's proposal, as well as a competing design produced by Junkers. While the Air Ministry did place an initial order for 20 aircraft, which included the prototype and pre-production units. The company's founder, Ernst Heinkel, personally lobbied in favour of the project, pointing to its simplicity, lower material cost, and more rapid development schedule. It was claimed that as many as 200 He 343s could be supplied by July 1945. The DFS designated the project P.1068. However, during late 1944, Heinkel was ordered to stop all work on the programme and the order was cancelled. This outcome came as a consequence of Germany's deteriorating position in the conflict and to refocus limited resources onto efforts such as the Emergency Fighter Program. The aviation author Daniel Uziel claimed that German authorities had probably wanted Heinkel to concentrate on producing the Heinkel He 162 fighter instead.

While no aircraft were ever completed, much of the design work had been completed and a substantial amount of components for the project had already been produced. The incomplete airframes and components were initially stored by Heinkel in the hope that the project would be resumed. As the conflict approached its conclusion in 1945, the Allied powers sought to obtain whatever technical information that could be recovered from Nazi Germany, particularly on its advanced military projects and aerospace initiatives. The Soviet Union succeeded in acquiring much of the He 343's design and components from Heinkel's facility in Schwechat, outside Vienna. Thereafter, it is alleged that the project served as the basis for the development of the Ilyushin Il-22, albeit with some of the parameters being altered, such as the size and crew numbers. A single prototype was built and flown. The results of these tests were used in development of the Ilyushin Il-28.

== Specifications (projected – He 343A-1) ==
Data from Luftwaffe Secret Projects (vol.2): Strategic Bombers 1935–1945

General characteristics

- Crew: 2
- Length: 15.5 m (50 ft 10 in)
- Wingspan: 18 m (59 ft 1 in)
- Height: 5.35 m (17 ft 7 in)
- Wing area: 42.45 m^{2} (456.9 sq ft)
- Gross weight: 19,550 kg (43,100 lb)
- Powerplant: 4 × Heinkel HeS 011 turbojet engines, 12.7 kN (2,900 lbf) thrust each

Performance

- Maximum speed: 910 km/h (570 mph, 490 kn)
- Range: 2,800 km (1,700 mi, 1,500 nmi)

Armament

- Bombs: up to 3,000 kg (6,612 lb)

== See also ==
Related lists

- List of German aircraft projects, 1939–45
- List of World War II jet aircraft
