= Focke-Wulf Flitzer =

German world war-ll jet fighter

Flitzer
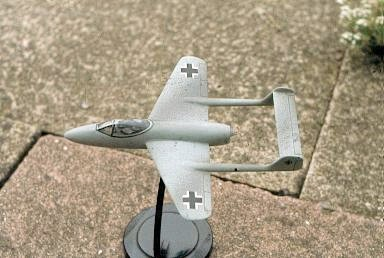
- Wartime model of the Project VI design

General information
- Type: Fighter
- Manufacturer: Focke-Wulf
- Status: Unfinished project
- Number built: One mockup built and a few prototype sub-assemblies completed

The Focke-Wulf Flitzer ("streaker" or "dasher", sometimes incorrectly translated as "madcap") was a jet fighter under development in Germany at the end of World War II.

== Development ==
The design, also called Entwurf VI (Sketch VI), had a central fuselage and two booms carrying the rear control surfaces, similar to the contemporary de Havilland Vampire.

Its air inlets were initially positioned on either side of the nose, just below the cockpit. They were later moved to the wing roots to improve speed. Further improvements included a narrower fuselage and a changed pilot's canopy. In order to improve the rate of climb, a Walter HWK 109-509 hypergolic liquid-propellant rocket was built in to give supplementary thrust. A complete mockup was built and all construction and assembly plans were finished, but the aircraft was not accepted by the Reich Air Ministry (Reichsluftfahrtministerium, RLM).

Although referred to as Fw 272 in some sources, the Flitzer was never given an RLM designation, and the putative designation "Fw 272" is derived from drawing Nr. 272 for the Flitzer.

== Specifications (design draft of 15 September 1944) ==
Data from

General characteristics

- Crew: one pilot
- Length: 10.55 m (34 ft 7 in)
- Wingspan: 8.00 m (26 ft 3 in)
- Height: 2.35 m (7 ft 8 in)
- Wing area: 17.0 m^{2} (183 sq ft)
- Empty weight: 2,730 kg (6,018 lb)
- Gross weight: 4,350 kg (9,589 lb)
- Powerplant: 1 × Heinkel HeS 011 turbojet , 14.7 kN (3,306 lbf) thrust
- Powerplant: 1 × Walter HWK 109-509 rocket , 16.7 kN (3,750 lbf) thrust

Performance

- Maximum speed: 955 km/h (593 mph, 515 kn)
- Endurance: 1 hours 50 minutes
- Service ceiling: 13,000 m (42,500 ft)
- Rate of climb: 18.2 m/s (3,600 ft/min)

Armament

- 2 × 30 mm (1.18 in) MK 103 cannon
- 2 × 20 mm MG 151 cannon

== See also ==
- Emergency Fighter Program

Aircraft of comparable role, configuration, and era

- de Havilland Vampire
- Saab 21R

== Bibliography ==
- Masters, David (1982). German Jet Genesis. London: Jane's Publishing.
- Schick, Walter; Ingolf Meyer (1997). Luftwaffe Secret Projects: Fighters 1939–1945. Hinckley: Midland Publishing. pp. 143–44.
- Smith, J. R. (1973). Focke-Wulf: An Aircraft Album. London: Ian Allan.
- Smith, J. R.; A. Kay (1972). German Aircraft of the Second World War. London: Putnam.
- Wagner, Wolfgang (1980). Kurt Tank: Konstruckteur und Test Pilot bei Focke-Wulf. Munich: Bernard and Graefe.
