= Focke-Wulf Volksjäger =

German emergency fighter project for the Luftwaffe

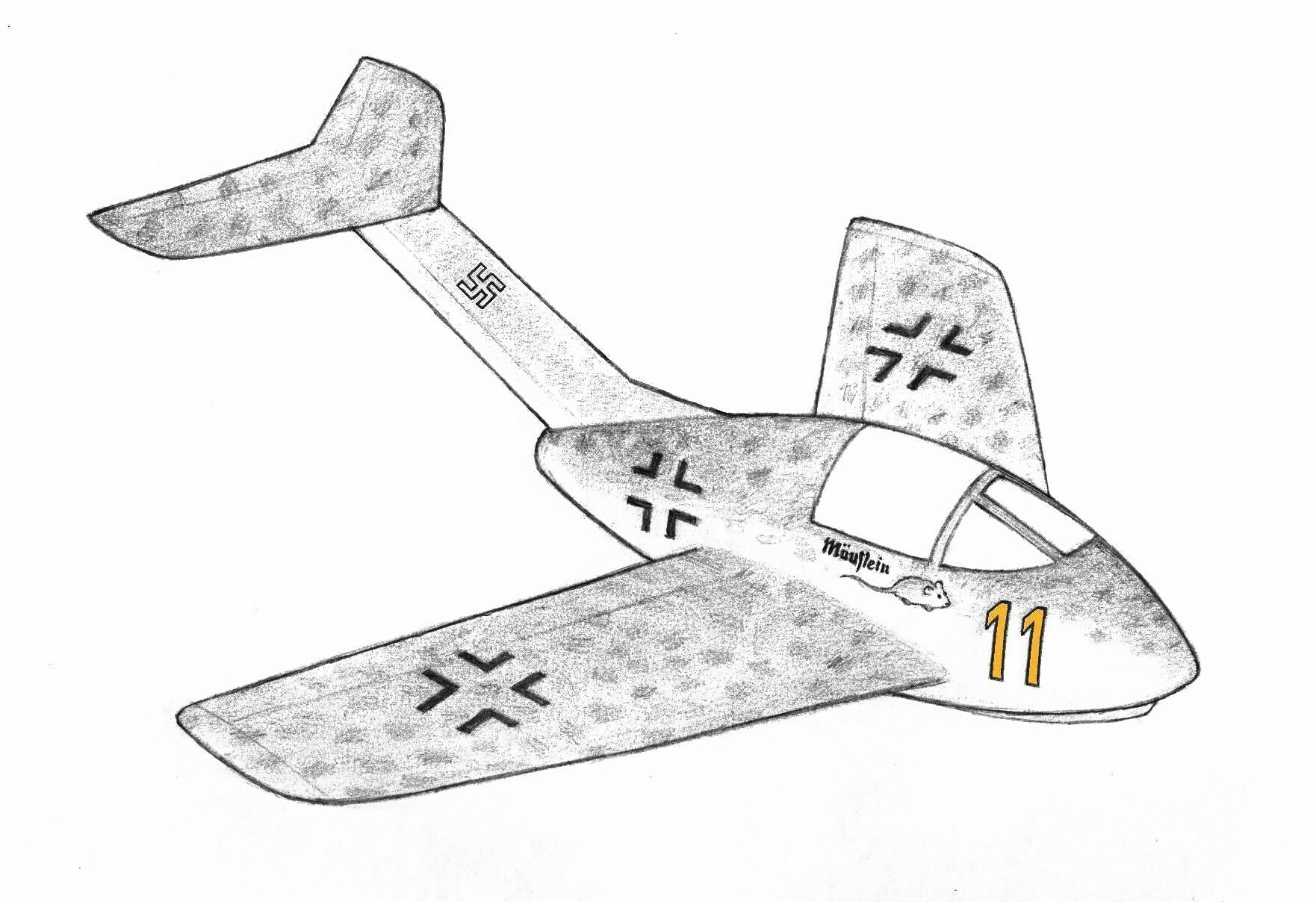
- Fw Volksjäger 2

General information
- Type: Interceptor
- Manufacturer: Focke-Wulf
- Status: Terminated by end of war
- Primary user: Luftwaffe
- Number built: Three units under construction

History
- Developed from: Focke-Wulf Ta 183

The Focke-Wulf Volksjäger (German: "people's fighter"), was a German emergency fighter project for the Luftwaffe. It was designed by Focke-Wulf towards the end of World War II as part of the defense effort against the devastating Allied bombing raids.

== History ==
In mid 1944 the Nazi Ministry of Aviation launched a Volksjäger program and in the months that followed Focke-Wulf presented two consecutive projects. The variants presented were a turbojet and a rocket-powered design, corresponding to project number one and project number two. Neither of them was given an RLM aircraft designation.

== Variants ==
=== Volksjäger 1 ===
The initial Volksjäger competition in the second half of 1944 required the use of the BMW 003 jet engine. The Focke-Wulf Volksjäger 1, the first model of the Focke-Wulf project, was an innovative-looking single-jet aircraft. It was designed to be powered by one BMW 003 A1 turbojet as an actual contract competitor to the Heinkel He 162A Spatz, the winner of the Volksjäger design competition and the selected Volksjäger aircraft to be mass-produced.

The air intake of the turbojet engine was placed in the front and the engine itself in the lower fuselage. Two possible shoulder wing configurations were designed for the Fw Volksjäger 1, straight and swept back. The wings of the swept back version spanned 7.5 m (24 ft 7 in) and had an area of 13.5 m^{2} (145 ft^{2}). The tail was supported by a boom above the engine exhaust. The aircraft was to be armed with two 30.0 mm (1.18 in) MK 108 cannon, one on each side of the air intake.

In some postwar English language publications, the Fw Volksjäger 1 project is referred to by the incorrect name "Volksflugzeug", a name that is not found in any German-language source referring to this aircraft, but referring instead to a very different Nazi aviation project.

=== Volksjäger 2 ===
Designed for early 1945 RLM requirements the Focke-Wulf Volksjäger 2 was a small rocket-powered interceptor. It had a wingspan of 4.8 m (15 ft 9 in) and a length of 5.3 m (17 ft 5 in). Power was to be provided by a Walter HWK 109-509 A-2 rocket engine that would enable it to reach speeds nearing 1,000 km/h (620 mph). Armament was to be two 30.0 mm (1.18 in) MK 108 cannon located under the fuselage.

In order to save strategic materials, the wings of the Fw Volksjäger 2 were built of wood and covered with a thin metal layer. The wings, swept back and mounted on mid-fuselage, as well as the T-tail, were similar to those of the Focke-Wulf Ta 183. The aircraft had no wheels, only a landing skid. It was designed to take off on a detachable dolly. Once airborne it would speed almost vertically towards the bomber combat box formations where it would fire its cannon.

Although the Fw Volksjäger 2 was designed to reach an altitude of 5,900 m in one minute, its roughly 15 minutes of combat action time compromised it as an interceptor. Test flights for this aircraft were scheduled to be carried out between May and June 1945. Three units of the Fw Volksjäger 2 were under construction at the time of the surrender of Nazi Germany.

== Specifications ==
=== Volksjäger 1 ===
General characteristics

- Crew: one
- Length: 8.8 m (28 ft 9 in)
- Wingspan: 7.5 m (26 ft 7 in) swept back
- Height: 2.85 m (9 ft 4 in)
- Wing area: 13.5 m^{2} (145 sq ft) swept back
- Gross weight: 3,050 kg (6,723 lb)
- Powerplant: 1 × BMW 003 A1 turbojet, 5.87 kN (1,320 lbf) thrust at 8,000 rpm

Performance

- Maximum speed: 820 km/h (509 mph, 442 kn)

Armament
2 × 30mm MK 108 cannons in nose

=== Volksjäger 2 ===
General characteristics

- Crew: 1
- Length: 5.3 m (17 ft 5 in)
- Wingspan: 4.8 m (15 ft 9 in)
- Height: 2.7 m (8 ft 10 in)
- Empty weight: 180 kg (396 lb)
- Powerplant: 1 × Walter HWK 109-509 A-2 rocket engine, 16.6 kN (3,740 lbf) thrust

Performance

- Maximum speed: 1,000 km/h (620 mph, 540 kn) (621 Mph)

Armament
2 × 30mm MK 108 cannons in the lower fuselage

== See also ==
Related development

- Focke-Wulf Ta 183

Aircraft of comparable role, configuration, and era

- Bachem Ba 349
- He 162 Volksjäger
- Messerschmitt Me 163 Komet

Related lists

- List of German aircraft projects, 1939–45
- List of military aircraft of Germany by manufacturer
- List of rocket aircraft

== Bibliography ==
- Walter Schick, Geheimprojekte der Luftwaffe- Jagdflugzeuge 1939–1945, Motorbuch Verlag; 1st edition (1994) ISBN 978-3613016316
