= Lippisch P.15 =

P.15
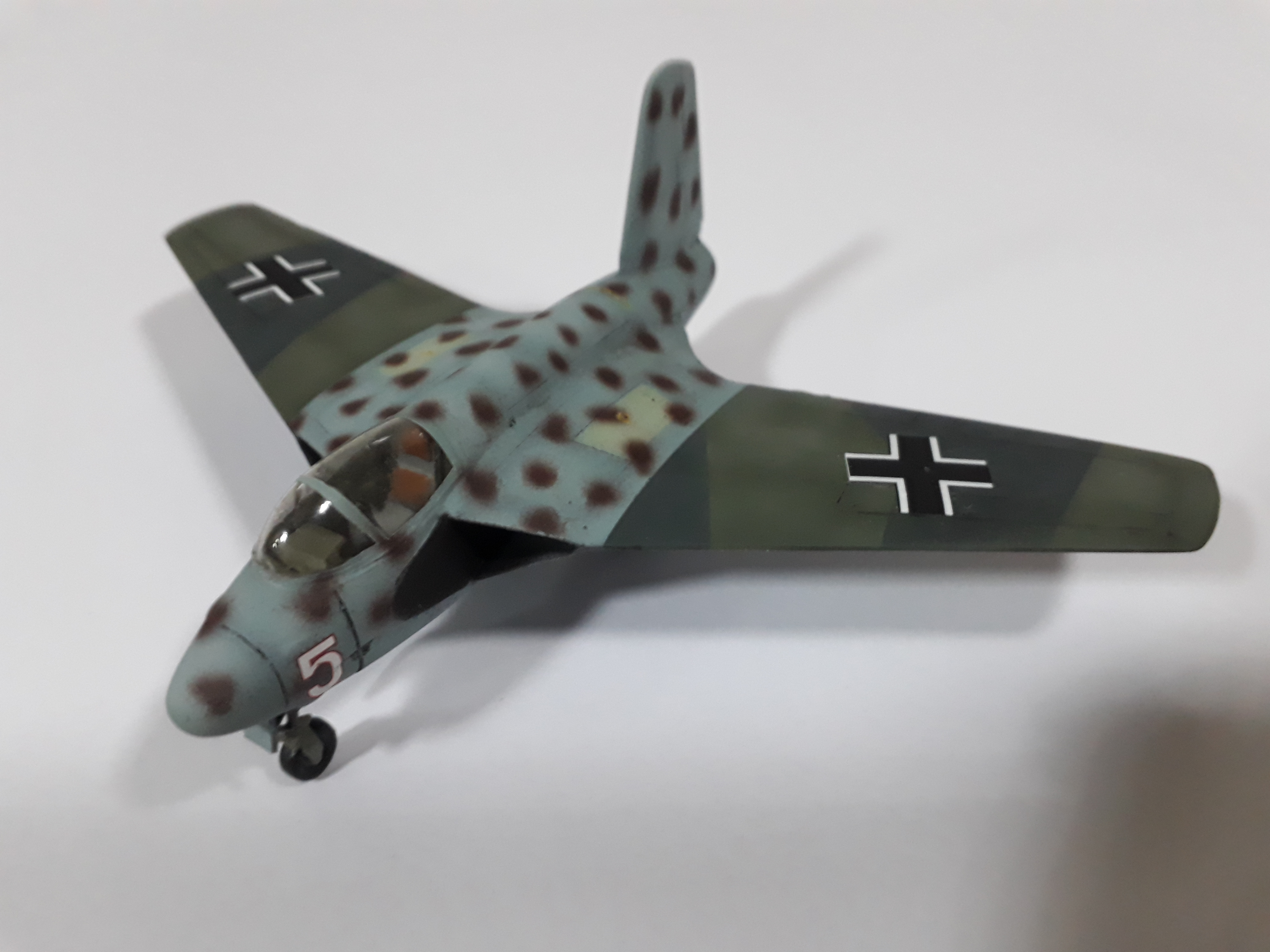
- Model of the Li P.15 Diana

General information
- Type: Fighter
- National origin: Germany
- Manufacturer: Lippisch
- Designer: Alexander Lippisch
- Status: Cancelled
- Number built: None

History
- Developed from: Messerschmitt Me 163

The Lippisch P.15 was a proposed World War II German fighter aircraft.

== Development ==
Alexander Lippisch designed the Li P.15 after inspecting the new Heinkel He 162 which he thought could be improved. The redesigned He 162 composed of the nose section of the Heinkel 162, the wings and tail of the Me 163C, a newly designed rear fuselage, and landing gear adapted from the Bf 109.

Power was to be supplied by a single Heinkel HeS 011 A turbojet contained within the rear fuselage, which was fed by two intakes buried in the wing roots.

Though the full-scale plane was never actually built, modelers can purchase a Radio Control model version.

== Specifications ==
General characteristics

- Crew: 1
- Length: 6.4 m (21 ft 0 in)
- Wingspan: 10.08 m (33 ft 1 in)
- Powerplant: 1 × Heinkel HeS 011 turbojet engine, 12.7 kN (2,900 lbf) thrust

Performance

- Maximum speed: 1,000 km/h (620 mph, 540 kn)

Armament

- Guns: 2x 20 mm MG 151/20 autocannon in the wing and 2x 30 mm MK 108 cannon in the forward fuselage sides

== Bibliography ==
- Griehl, Manfred (1998). Jet Planes of the Third Reich, the Secret Projects. Vol. One. Sturbridge, Massachusetts: Monogram Publications. ISBN 0-914144-36-7.
