= Focke-Wulf Project II =

Fw P.II

General information
- Type: Fighter
- Manufacturer: Focke-Wulf
- Status: Abandoned design study

The Focke-Wulf Project II was a design study for a single-seat jet fighter, carried out in Germany during World War II.

== Development ==
Owing to manufacturing difficulties envisaged with other all-new jet fighter developments, Focke-Wulf's second design was nothing more than a development of the Focke-Wulf Fw 190, but powered with a jet engine, positioned on a redesigned fuselage. This engine, a Jumo 004, was to be housed beneath the nose. A conventional undercarriage was used. The low position of the jet intake raised the likelihood of foreign matter being sucked up, and in any case, the engine would burn the runway. This design development ceased in March 1943.

== Specifications (as designed) ==
General characteristics

- Crew: one pilot
- Length: 9.85 m (32 ft 4 in)
- Wingspan: 9.70 m (31 ft 10 in)
- Wing area: 15.0 m^{2} (161 sq ft)
- Empty weight: 2,410 kg (5,313 lb)
- Gross weight: 3,350 kg (7,385 lb)
- Powerplant: 1 × Junkers Jumo 004B , 8.7 kN (1,962 lbf) thrust

Performance

- Maximum speed: 825 km/h (515 mph, 448 kn)
- Range: 640 km (397 mi, 345 nmi)
- Service ceiling: 12,400 m (40,600 ft)
- Rate of climb: 20 m/s (4,000 ft/min)

Armament

- 2 × 30 mm (1.18 in) MK 108 cannons
- 2 × 20 mm MG 151 cannons

== See also ==
Aircraft of comparable role, configuration, and era

- Yakovlev Yak-15
