= Arado E.555 =

Bomber aircraft in Nazi Germany

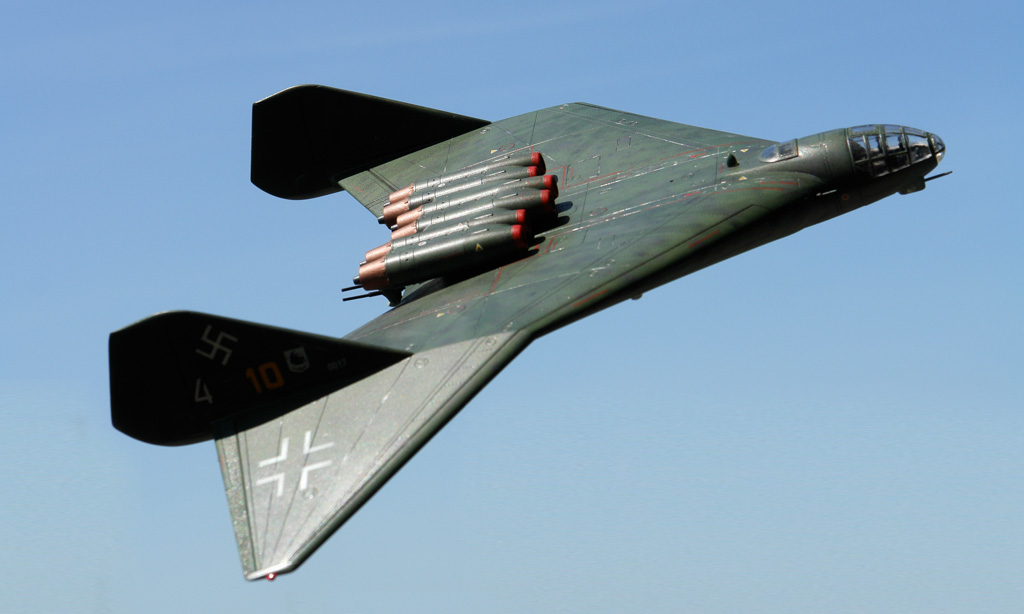
- Model depicting an Arado E.555 I

General information
- Type: Strategic bomber
- Manufacturer: Arado Flugzeugwerke
- Primary user: Luftwaffe
- Number built: 0

The Arado E.555 was a long range strategic bomber proposed by the German Arado company during World War II in response to the RLM's Amerikabomber project. The E.555 designation was applied to a series of long range jet bomber designs of various sizes, powerplant, crew and weapon load configurations. As design studies only, no aircraft were developed or constructed and the entire E.555 project was cancelled at the end of 1944.

== Project request ==
In 1942, the Reichsluftfahrtministerium (Reich Air Ministry, RLM) put forward an initiative to obtain a long-range bomber for the Luftwaffe that would be capable of striking the continental United States from Germany. Requests for designs were made to the major German aircraft manufacturers early in World War II, long before the U.S. had entered the war. Arado had begun its own independent project design work for a future jet flying wing bomber in late 1943; up until that time other manufacturers, such as Heinkel (by the February 1943 timeframe), Messerschmitt, Focke-Wulf and Junkers had piston-engined intercontinental bomber designs under various stages of consideration and initial prototype testing per the RLM's request. Arado had also developed its own small, shorter-range jet bomber, the Ar 234 Blitz, which first flew in June 1943. By early 1944, Arado was asked to compile design studies for a long-range jet-powered bomber.

== Designs ==
Several different E.555 design configurations were proposed and considered; the Arado team's overall goal for the project was an aircraft with high speed, long range and capable of carrying a four-ton (4,000 kg) bomb load. Perhaps the most striking was the E.555 I, a six-jet, angular flying wing design with remotely-operated defensive turrets. The trijet E.555 VI had the longest wingspan of all the proposals at 28.4 m (93 ft) and range (carrying supplementary fuel tanks) of 7,500 km (4,700 mi). The aircraft were to be powered using a jet engine which had not completed development as of 1944, the 34.3 kN (7,700 lbf) thrust BMW 018; from two to six of these powerplants in each of the proposed E.555 designs.

All of the E.555 projects were abandoned, following a 22 December 1944 order by the Reich Air Ministry.

Arado E.555 I
Six-engine flying wing bomber
Arado E.555 II
Four-engine flying wing bomber
Arado E.555 III
Twin-engine flying wing bomber
Arado E.555 IV
Three-engine flying wing bomber
Arado E.555 VI
Three-engine flying wing bomber
Arado E.555 VII
Three-engine flying wing bomber
Arado E.555 VIII
Three-engine flying wing bomber
Arado E.555 IX
Three-engine flying wing bomber
Arado E.555 X
Three-engine flying wing bomber
Arado E.555 XI
Four-engine bomber

== Specifications (E.555-6) ==
Data from Luftwaffe Secret Projects: Strategic Bombers 1935–1945

General characteristics

- Crew: 3
- Length: 12.35 m (40 ft 6 in)
- Wingspan: 28.4 m (93 ft 2 in)
- Height: 3.74 m (12 ft 3 in)
- Wing area: 160 m^{2} (1,700 sq ft)
- Fuel capacity: 18,750 kg (41,337 lb)
- Powerplant: 2-4 × BMW 109-018 turbojet

Performance

- Maximum speed: 875–920 km/h (544–572 mph, 472–497 kn)
- Range: 5,400–7,500 km (3,400–4,700 mi, 2,900–4,000 nmi)

Armament

- Bombs: 4,000 kg (8,818 lb) of bombs
