= List of Blohm & Voss aircraft =

The aircraft listed here were all designed by the aircraft manufacturing company associated with Blohm & Voss shipbuilders of Hamburg, Germany. The company changed its name several times, from Hamburger Flugzeugbau GmbH to Blohm & Voss Abteilung Flugzeugbau, and back to Hamburger Flugzeugbau GmbH (HFB). Some types therefore carry designations for more than one name. Many of the company's design studies were never built but are nevertheless of significant technical or historical interest. Less significant designs, other company's types manufactured under contract and joint projects under other names are not listed. Blohm and Voss made planes for the luftwaffe.

== List of aircraft ==
Type	Class	Role	Date	Status	Notes
Ha 135	Propeller	Trainer	1934	Prototype	Biplane
Ha 136	Propeller	Trainer	1934	Prototype	
Ha 137	Propeller	Attack	1935	Prototype	
Ha 138/BV 138 Seedrache	Flying boat	Patrol	1937	Production	Twin-boom trimotor
Ha 139	Floatplane	Transport	1936	Prototype	Third prototype redesignated and used operationally
Ha 140	Floatplane	Attack	1937	Prototype	
Ha 141/BV 141	Propeller	Patrol	1938	Prototype	Asymmetric. A pre-production batch was delivered.
Ha 142/BV 142	Propeller	Transport	1938	Prototype	Landplane version of Ha 139
BV 143	Munition	Missile	1939	Prototype	Hybrid glide/rocket anti-shipping munition
BV 144	Propeller	Transport	1944	Prototype	Variable-incidence wing
BV 155	Propeller	Fighter	1944	Prototype	Development of Messerschmitt Me 155
Ha 222/BV 222 Wiking	Flying boat	Transport	1940	Production	Largest production flying boat of WWII
BV 237	Propeller	Attack	1940	Project	Asymmetric. Development of the BV 141.
BV 238	Propeller	Patrol	1944	Prototype	Largest WWII aircraft flown. BV 238 land variant was redesignated BV 250.
BV 246 Hagelkorn	Munition	Glide bomb	1943	Production	Never used operationally
BV 250	Propeller	Multi-role	1942	Project	Land version of the BV 238 for transport, bombing and patrol use
BV 726	Jet flying boat	Transport	1941	Project	Development of the propeller-driven P 200
BV 950 L10 Friedensengel	Munition	Glide torpedo	1942	Production	Never used operationally
BV 950 L11 Schneewittchen	Munition	Glide torpedo	1944	Production	High-speed launch version of L10. Never used operationally.
BV 40	Glider	Fighter	1944	Prototype	
P 7	Propeller	Attack		Project	Alternative to the Ha 137
P 8	Flying boat	Patrol	1934	Project	Twin-boom trimotor. Alternative to P 12 and P 13 Scaled-up to become the Ha 138.
P 11	Propeller	Attack	1936	Project	Navalised Ha 137. P 11a modified with floats.
P 12	Flying boat	Patrol	1934	Project	Conventional trimotor. Alternative to P 8 and P 13.
P 13	Flying boat	Patrol	1934	Project	Twin-hulled, four-engined. Alternative to P 8 and P 12.
P 19a	Propeller	Patrol	1935	Project	Landplane variant of the P 19/Ha 140
P 20	Floatplane	Transport	1935	Project	Reconnaissance-bomber variant of Ha 139
P 42	Flying boat	Transport	1937	Project	Twin-hull. Predecessor to Ha 222
P 43	Flying boat	Transport	1937	Project	Predecessor to Ha 222
P 97	Flying boat	Transport	1939	Project	Re-engined BV 222
P 98	Flying boat	Transport	1939	Project	Re-engined BV 222
P 110	Flying boat	Patrol	1940	Project	Twin-boom BV 138 replacement. Alternatives were P 110–113 and 122–125.
P 111	Flying boat	Patrol	1940	Project	Asymmetric BV 138 replacement. Alternatives were P 110–113 and 122–125.
P 112	Flying boat	Patrol	1940	Project	Asymmetric BV 138 replacement. Alternatives were P 110–113 and 122–125.
P 113	Flying boat	Patrol	1940	Project	Twin-hull BV 138 replacement. Alternatives were P 110–113 and 122–125.
P 122	Flying boat	Patrol	1940	Project	Twin-boom BV 138 replacement. Alternatives were P 110–113 and 122–125.
P 123	Flying boat	Patrol	1940	Project	Twin-hull BV 138 replacement. Alternatives were P 110–113 and 122–125.
P 124	Flying boat	Patrol	1940	Project	Twin-boom BV 138 replacement. Alternatives were P 110–113 and 122–125.
P 125	Flying boat	Patrol	1940	Project	Twin-hull BV 138 replacement. Alternatives were P 110–113 and 122–125.
P 163	Propeller	Bomber	1942	Project	Crew in wingtip nacelles, single contra-prop
P 170	Propeller	Bomber	1942	Project	Trimotor with wingtip nacelles
P 175	Jet	Fighter		Project	Shipboard or parasite
P 178	Jet	Attack		Project	Asymmetric
P 184	Propeller	Patrol	1943	Project	High aspect ratio, four engines
P 188	Jet	Bomber	1943	Project	W-wing
P 190	Jet	Fighter		Project	
P 192	Propeller	Attack	1944	Project	Three-surface with mid-mounted propeller
P 193	Propeller	Attack	1944	Project	Pusher, variable-incidence wing
P 194	Hybrid	Attack	1944	Project	Asymmetric. Propeller + jet.
P 196	Jet	Attack	1944	Project	Twin-boom
P 197	Jet	Fighter	1944	Project	Swept wing
P 198	Jet	Fighter	1944	Project	
P 199	Jet	Fighter		Project	
P 200	Flying boat	Transport	1941	Project	
P 201	Rocket	Fighter		Project	
P 202	Jet	Fighter	1944	Project	Slewed wing
P 203	Hybrid	Fighter	1944	Project	Propeller + jet
P 204	Hybrid	Attack	1944	Project	Asymmetric. Propeller + jet
P 207	Propeller	Fighter	1944	Project	Alternative to P 208
P 208	Propeller	Fighter	1944	Project	Tailless pusher. Alternative to P 207.
P 209	Jet	Fighter	1944	Project	.01 was tailless, .02 forward swept
P 210	Jet	Fighter	1944	Project	Tailless. Volksjäger submission.
P 211	Jet	Fighter	1944	Project	Volksjäger submission
P 212	Jet	Fighter	1945	Project	Tailless
P 213	Pulse jet	Fighter	1944	Project	Miniaturjäger submission
P 214	Glider	Attack	1944	Project	Suicide bomb
P 215	Jet	Fighter	1945	Project	Tailless
Ae 607	Jet	Fighter	1945	Project	Flying wing delta (drawing number)
HFB 209	Propeller	Transport	1960	Project	
HFB 314	Jet	Transport	1960	Project	
HFB 320 Hansa Jet	Jet	Transport	1964	Production	Forward-swept wings

== See also ==
- List of aircraft § Blohm & Voss
- List of aircraft § Hamburger Flugzeugbau
- List of aircraft § HFB
- List of German aircraft projects, 1939–45 § Blohm & Voss
- List of Blohm & Voss aircraft projects

=== Associated types ===
These aircraft were built under the direction, in whole or in part, of B&V/HFB:

- Skoda-Kauba SK SL6, a modification of the SK V-6 with an outboard tail, to test the proposed control system for the P 208 tailless pusher fighter.
- FGP 227 quarter-scale flying test model of the Blohm & Voss BV 238 flying boat
- Transall C-160 joint venture transport.
