= Blohm & Voss P 197 =

P 197

General information
- Type: Jet fighter
- Manufacturer: Blohm & Voss
- Designer: Richard Vogt
- Status: Design project

The Blohm & Voss P 197 was a design project during World War II for a single-seat twinjet fighter, in response to a requirement issued in 1944.

== Design ==
The P 197 had a conventional layout overall, with the two Junkers Jumo 004 jet engines housed side by side within the fuselage and fed by flush intakes just ahead of the wing roots and on either side of the forward-mounted cockpit. The nose also accommodated the forward-firing cannon and the retractable nosewheel of the tricycle undercarriage.

The low-set wing was sharply swept with marked dihedral, and behind it a T-tail sat above the engine exhausts.

Armament comprised four forward-firing heavy-calibre guns or cannon.

== Specification ==
Data from Masters (1982).

General characteristics

- Length: 9.0 m (29 ft 6 in)
- Wingspan: 11.1 m (36 ft 5 in)
- Gross weight: 5,830 kg (12,853 lb)
- Powerplant: 2 × Junkers Jumo 004 turbojet, 7.8 kN (1,800 lbf) thrust (800 kg) each

Performance

- Maximum speed: 1,060 km/h (660 mph, 570 kn) at 8,200 metres (26,900 ft)
