= Blohm & Voss P 188 =

Long-range, heavy jet bomber design project

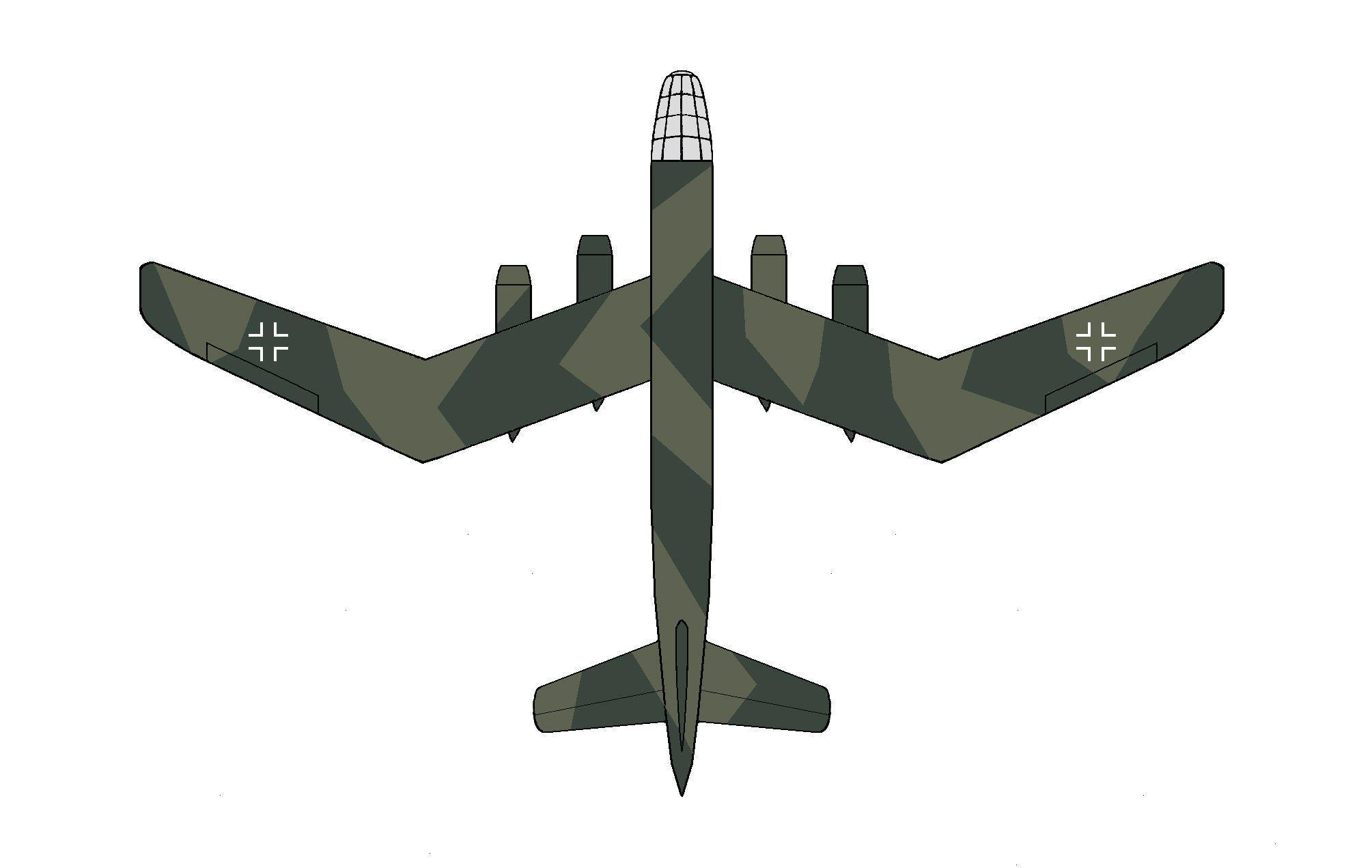
- P 188.01

General information
- Type: Bomber
- Manufacturer: Blohm & Voss
- Status: Rejected by RLM
- Primary user: Luftwaffe
- Number built: None

The Blohm & Voss Bv P 188 was a long-range, heavy jet bomber design project by the Blohm & Voss aircraft manufacturing division during the last years of the Third Reich. It featured a novel W-wing planform with variable incidence.

The project was rejected in favour of the Junkers Ju 287 and no aircraft was ever built.

== Design ==
In 1943 the RLM. the German Air Ministry, issued a specification for a long-range heavy bomber to be powered by jet engines. Richard Vogt, chief designer for the Blohm und Voss aircraft division, responded with the BV P.188.

Blohm & Voss had been studying the swept wing and its associated problems such as aeroelasticity. As a swept wing bends under aerodynamic loads, its angle of attack changes, causing undesirable effects. Vogt proposed that the direction of sweep be changed mid-span, so that the outer part of the wing would compensate for any bending of the inner part. The resulting W-wing was adopted for the P.188. The wing inner sections were swept back 20 degrees while the outer halves were swept 20 degrees forward.

The fuselage centre section comprised a one-piece steel fuel tank, with the pivoting wing carry-through structure passing through it and above the bomb bay. Fore and aft fuselage sections were of duralumin light alloy. A pressurized crew cabin was located at the forward end of the fuselage.

The main undercarriage consisted of two sets of vertically retracting wheels located fore and aft in tandem under the fuselage. Because of this the fuselage could not rotate for takeoff in the usual way and instead a variable-incidence wing, originally developed for the BV 144 transport, was used. Small retractable outrigger wheels would be placed in the wings.

The bomber was to be powered by four Junkers Jumo 004C turbojets placed below the wings.

Because of the uncertainties surrounding the design, four variants were put forward in all, differing mainly in their engine locations, armament, cabin and tail layout. In the event, the design was perceived as a high risk and the project was rejected in favour of the Junkers Ju 287 forward-swept prototype.

== Variants ==
Four different variants of the P 188 were offered. The best arrangement for the four engines was unknown, so two different arrangements were offered. It was also believed that the high speed of the aeroplane would provide sufficient protection, so some variants were not fitted with defensive armament. The provision of guns and cannon on the other two variants affected the layout of the cabin and tail, and these variants would have had a lower top speed.

=== P 188.01 ===
Four turbojets placed in separate nacelles under the wings. The tail section was of a conventional type and the projected speed was such that no defensive armament was carried.

=== P 188.02 ===
With a similar engine arrangement to the BV P.188 01, the 02 had twin tail fins to make room for a tail installation containing two MG-131 machine guns. The cockpit was also raised to accommodate two 20 mm MG-151 cannon in a nose turret. Two further MG-151s were installed under the rear fuselage.

=== P 188.03 ===
In the third variant, the outer engines were moved inboard next to the inner ones, creating a single paired installation on each side. This reduced drag and therefore increased speed. It also improved asymmetric handling in the engine-out situation. In other respects, the '03 was similar to the unarmed '01.

=== P 188.04 ===
A long-range variant with a redesigned nose section to allow a slimmer fuselage, the '04 had additional steel fuel tankage in the fuselage and wings. These changes meant that the bomb load had to be carried externally, beneath the fuselage. Defensive armament comprised dorsal and ventral twin-machine-gun barbettes as well as nose and tail mounted twin 20 mm cannon installations. The twin tail was given added dihedral to angle it above the jet exhaust.

== Specifications (P 188.03) ==
Data from Pohlmann (1982).

General characteristics

- Length: 17.6 m (57 ft 9 in)
- Wingspan: 27 m (88 ft 7 in)
- Wing area: 60 m^{2} (650 sq ft)
- Empty weight: 13,300 kg (29,321 lb)
- Gross weight: 23,800 kg (52,470 lb)
- Powerplant: 4 × Junkers Jumo 004C Turbojet engines, 10.0 kN (2,200 lbf) thrust each

Performance

- Maximum speed: 825 km/h (513 mph, 445 kn)
- Range: 1,500 km (930 mi, 810 nmi)
- Service ceiling: 10,000 m (33,000 ft)

Armament

- Guns: No defensive guns provided
- Bombs: 2,000 kg

== See also ==
Aircraft of comparable role, configuration, and era

- Arado E.560
- Junkers Ju 287

Related lists

- List of German aircraft projects, 1939–45
- List of World War II jet aircraft
