= Blohm & Voss P 184 =

P 184
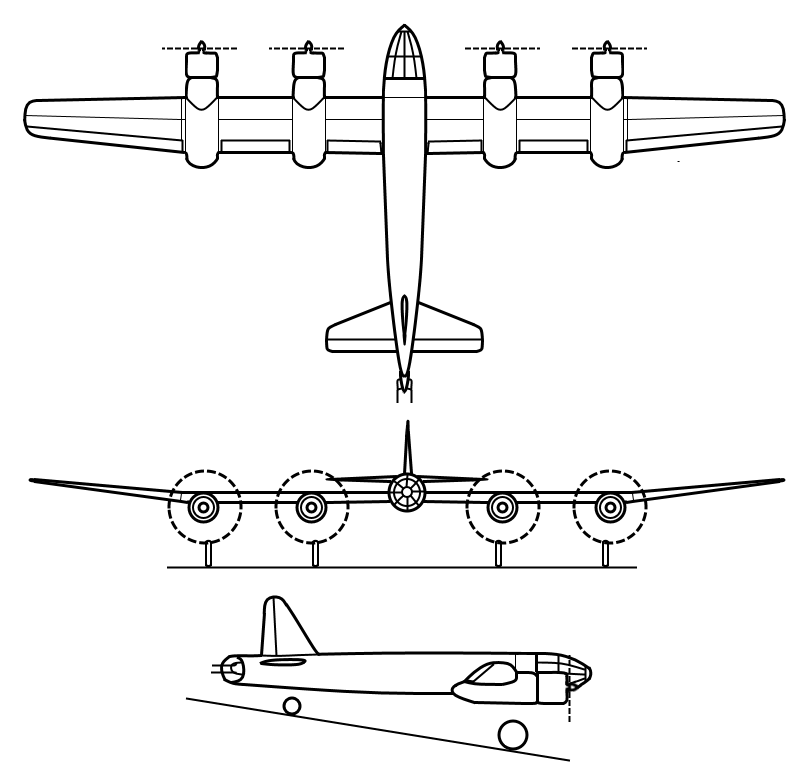
- BV P.184.01

General information
- Type: Long-range reconnaissance
- Manufacturer: Blohm & Voss
- Designer: Richard Vogt
- Status: Design project

The Blohm & Voss P 184 was a German design for a long-range reconnaissance aircraft during World War II. Carrying a crew of five, it was of aerodynamically clean appearance and its wing had an unusually high aspect ratio.

== Design ==
Developed in 1943, the P 184 was a large, long-range reconnaissance and patrol landplane capable of superseding the Focke-Wulf Fw 200 Condor. It was of conventional layout but, like many B&V designs, of innovative structure using a high proportion of steel.

The fuselage nose was fully glazed to provide excellent vision to the crew, all accommodated in the nose cabin. Behind the cabin, the entire centre section of the fuselage formed one giant integral fuel tank. The tail housed a defensive gun turret and a single retractable tailwheel. Further defensive armament was provided by a remote-controlled barbette under the fuselage.

The mid-mounted wing was of very high aspect ratio, having a large span combined with a relatively short chord to make it highly efficient. Four identical nacelles, distributed along the constant-chord centre section of the wing, each housed a BMW 801E radial engine providing almost 1,471 kilowatts (1,973 hp) takeoff power, with a retractable main undercarriage leg behind. The outer wing sections had a slight taper. As with most B&V designs, the main wing structure was an integral steel box which served as additional integral fuel tankage.

== Specifications Blohm und Voss P.184.01 ==
Data from Herwig, 2000, p.98 (some data)

General characteristics

- Crew: Five
- Length: 17.30 m (56 ft 9 in)
- Wingspan: 35.80 m (117 ft 5 in)
- Height: 6.60 m (21 ft 8 in)
- Wing area: 82 m^{2} (880 sq ft)
- Wing Chord: 2.20 m (7 ft 3 in)
- Powerplant: 4 × BMW 801E air-cooled radial, 1,450 kW (1,950 hp) each

Performance

- Maximum speed: 500 km/h (310 mph, 270 kn) (estimated)
- Range: 7,500 km (4,700 mi, 4,000 nmi)
- Service ceiling: 8,840 m (29,000 ft)
- Climb rate: 360 m or 200ft/min at sea level (maximum, estimated)

Armament

- Guns: 2 x 13 mm (0.51 in) MG 131 machine guns in tail barbette and 1 x fixed forward firing 30 mm (1.18 in) MK 103 cannon
- Bombs: 4,000 kg (8,800 lb) bombload internally
