= Blohm & Voss P 198 =

P 198

General information
- Type: High-altitude jet fighter
- Manufacturer: Blohm & Voss
- Designer: Richard Vogt
- Status: Design project

The Blohm & Voss P 198 was a design project during World War II for a single-seat high-altitude jet fighter.

== Design ==
The P 198 was of relatively conservative design for Blohm & Voss, being of conventional layout with a straight, unswept wing set low on a shallow fuselage, beneath which was faired in a single, large BMW 018 jet engine. The nose had room for a radar installation above the engine intake, with the cockpit set immediately behind and above the retracting nosewheel of the tricycle landing gear. The engine exhausted behind the wing, with the fuselage continuing back above it to a conventional tail with mid-set tailplane. Its large, 15 m span wing and powerful engine gave it a good rate of climb, at 8,900 ft/min.

Armament was to be one large-calibre cannon with proximity-fused shells and two smaller 20 mm cannon.

A swept-wing derivative with higher performance was planned, but the project was shelved when the BMW 018 was cancelled.

== Specification ==
Data from Masters (1982).

General characteristics

- Length: 12.8 m (42 ft 0 in)
- Wingspan: 15.0 m (49 ft 3 in)
- Gross weight: 7,440 kg (16,402 lb)
- Powerplant: 1 × BMW 018 turbojet, 33 kN (7,400 lbf) thrust (3,400 kg)

Performance

- Maximum speed: 800 km/h (500 mph, 430 kn) at 3,500 metres (11,500 ft)
- Range: 1,450 km (900 mi, 780 nmi)
- Endurance: 1 hr 50 min
- Rate of climb: 45 m/s (8,900 ft/min)
