= Kawasaki KDA-3 =

Japanese fighter prototype

KDA-3
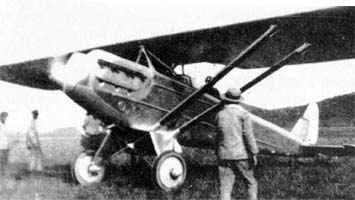

General information
- Type: Experimental Fighter
- National origin: Japan
- Manufacturer: Kawasaki
- Designer: Richard Vogt
- Primary user: Japan (Imperial Japanese Army Air Force)
- Number built: 3

History
- First flight: 1928

The Kawasaki KDA-3 was a single-engine, parasol wing, single seat experimental fighter aircraft designed by Dornier engineer Dr. Richard Vogt and built by Kawasaki for the Japanese Imperial Army, first flying in 1928. The KDA-3 was built to replace the Ko-4 but only three prototypes were built and it was not ordered into production.

== Design and development ==
In March 1927, the Rikugun Koku Hombu, or the Technical Branch of the Imperial Army Air Headquarters, ordered Kawasaki, Nakajima, and Mitsubishi to investigate design of a single-seat fighter on a competitive basis to replace the aging Ko-4 (Nieuport-Delage NiD 29). Kawasaki's entry was the parasol-wing single-engine Kawasaki KDA-3. The Mitsubishi 1MF2 Hayabusa and the Nakajima NC were the other competitors. Three prototype aircraft from each firm were to be delivered to the Tokorozawa Army test center for testing.

Vogt was hired by Kawasaki to assist that firm in designing new aircraft. He and his assistant engineer and primary student, Kawasaki's Takeo Doi, used the high-wing German Dornier Do H as the starting point for the KDA-3 design. The KDA-3 was to have higher performance than the Dornier. The first prototype KDA-3 was to be delivered April 1, 1928, but the landing gear collapsed before delivery could be made. Although the Mitsubishi Hayabusa recorded a maximum speed of 270 km/h (170 mph) at 3,000 m (9,843 ft), during a diving test the Mitsubishi fighter broke up in the air after exceeding 400 km/h (250 mph). The Rikugun Koku Hombu suspended evaluation of the contending types, canceled the program and began testing the other prototypes to destruction. Unfortunately for Kawasaki, Nakajima persevered with their own design and built six more prototypes, the last being tested extensively by the Japanese army before finally being accepted for production as the Nakajima Type 91 fighter.

The Imperial Japanese Army began turning to nationalism the same year, and before long, a decision was made at the highest level to no longer purchase aircraft that were not designed and built in Japan, and to no longer hire foreign engineers or designers. The experience in designing and building the KDA-3 was not lost, but was rather of great benefit to the designers, as they used the knowledge gained developing the KDA-3 in the design and construction of the Kawasaki KDA-5, an equal span biplane, which was accepted by the Japanese Army as the Kawasaki Army Type 92 Model 1 Fighter. One of the three (either the second or third built) KDA-3s received Japanese civil registration J-BEYF.

== Specifications (KDA-3) ==
Data from Japanese Aircraft 1910–1941

General characteristics

- Crew: 1
- Length: 8.85 m (29 ft 0 in)
- Wingspan: 12.60 m (41 ft 4 in)
- Height: 3 m (9 ft 10 in)
- Wing area: 25.0 m^{2} (269 sq ft)
- Empty weight: 1,350 kg (2,976 lb)
- Gross weight: 1,950 kg (4,299 lb)
- Powerplant: 1 × BMW VI twelve-cylinder vee water-cooled engine, 470 kW (630 hp)
- Propellers: 2-bladed wooden fixed-pitch propeller

Performance

- Maximum speed: 283 km/h (176 mph, 153 kn)
- Service ceiling: 9,000 m (30,000 ft)
- Time to altitude: 12 min to 5,000 m (16,400 ft)

Armament

- Guns: *2 × fixed forward-firing 7.7 mm machine guns
