= Blohm & Voss P 200 =

Type of aircraft

P 200

General information
- Type: Long-range transport
- National origin: Germany
- Manufacturer: Blohm & Voss
- Designer: Hans Amtmann
- Status: Design proposal

History
- Developed from: BV 222 Wiking

The Blohm & Voss P 200 was a design project for a transatlantic transport flying boat during World War II. It was intended to go into production for Deutsche Lufthansa after the war.

== History ==
During the early stages of World War II, when it was going well for Germany, the airline Deutsche Lufthansa raised a requirement for a postwar transatlantic flying boat with a capacity of 100 passengers. Blohm & Voss gave the design work to their Head of Preliminary Design, Hans Amtmann, who had the necessary experience.

== Design ==
Structurally, the P 200 was a scaled-up BV 222 Wiking. It was bigger even than the BV 238, and only the Hughes H-4 Hercules has ever been bigger.

Its hull accommodated three deck levels, providing luxury facilities for 120 passengers, with additional freight holds fore and aft.

The wing used Chief Designer Richard Vogt's standard technique of a tubular steel wing spar which also functioned as the main fuel tankage. Its section was thick enough for engineers to go along inside the wings and attend to the engines in flight.

The P 200 was to be powered by eight BMW 803 series twin-radial engines, each driving a contra-rotating propeller and delivering 2,950 kilowatts (3,960 hp).

== BV 726 jet derivative ==
The BV 726 was a jet-powered development of the P 200, its 700 series number indicating that construction would not begin until some time after the war was over.

== Specification ==
Data from Pohlmann (1982)

General characteristics

- Crew: 14
- Length: 70 m (229 ft 8 in)
- Wingspan: 85 m (278 ft 10 in)
- Height: 17.5 m (57 ft 5 in)
- Wing area: 715 m^{2} (7,700 sq ft)
- Empty weight: 115,000 kg (253,532 lb)
- Max takeoff weight: 210,000 kg (462,971 lb)
- Powerplant: 8 × BMW 803 twin-radial, 2,950 kW (3,950 hp) each

Performance

- Maximum speed: 390 km/h (240 mph, 210 kn) at 3,000 metres (9,800 ft)
- Range: 8,000 km (5,000 mi, 4,300 nmi)

== See also ==
Aircraft of comparable role, configuration, and era

- Hughes H-4 Hercules
- Blohm & Voss BV 222
- Blohm & Voss BV 238
