= Blohm & Voss P 203 =

P 203

General information
- Type: General purpose/long-range heavy fighter
- National origin: Germany
- Manufacturer: Blohm & Voss
- Designer: Richard Vogt
- Status: Design proposal

The Blohm & Voss P 203 was a design project for a heavy fighter during World War II. Capable of filling the roles of night fighter, light bomber and ground-attack, it had mixed propulsion, having both piston engine driven propellers and jet engines.

== Design ==
The P 203 was conceived by Blohm & Voss as a multi-role fighter-bomber, using mixed powerplants in an otherwise conventional layout. At that time jet engines could provide a high maximum speed but were unreliable and suffered poor thrust at low speeds, on the other hand conventional propellers provided good thrust at low-to-medium speeds but struggled as speeds increased. By using both kinds of powerplant, excellent performance across the whole speed range could be achieved. The P 203 was to carry two of each.

The fuselage was of broadly conventional layout, having a two-crew cabin at the front, a bomb bay underneath the centre and a conventional tail with remote rear gun barbette.

The mid-mounted wing was straight and of two different, untapered sections. The inboard sections had a deep chord front to back and were thick enough to house the main landing gear. They ended at wing-mounted nacelles which housed the powerplants. BMW 801TJ radial piston engines at the front drove twin propellers in the ordinary manner, while slung below and behind each of these and faired into the nacelle was a jet engine. Three versions were studied, each having a different type of jet engine; the P 203.01 had Heinkel-Hirth HeS 011A engines, the P 203.02 had Junkers Jumo 004 engines and the P 203.03 had BMW 003 engines. Outboard of the nacelles were thinner and shallower, lower-drag outer wing sections.

Besides the tail barbette, additional armament was housed in the nose.

Also unusual for the era was a tricycle undercarriage arrangement, with a nosewheel retracting up beneath the cabin.

== Specification (P 203.01) ==
Data from Masters (1982)

General characteristics

- Crew: 2
- Length: 16.6 m (54 ft 6 in)
- Wingspan: 19.95 m (65 ft 5 in)
- Gross weight: 18,370 kg (40,499 lb)
- Powerplant: 2 × BMW 801TJ radial, 1,300 kW (1,800 hp) each
- Powerplant: 2 × Heinkel-Hirth HeS 011 jet

Performance

- Maximum speed: 920 km/h (570 mph, 500 kn) at 12,000 metres (39,000 ft)
- Service ceiling: 14,300 m (46,900 ft)

Armament

- Guns:

- Fixed Forward-firing weapons, located in the fuselage sides:
  - 2 × 30 mm (1.18 in) MK 103 cannons
  - 2 × 15 mm (0.59 in) MG 151/15 cannons
  - 2 × 13 mm (0.51 in) MG 131 machine guns
- Remote-controlled tail barbette: 2 × 13 mm (0.51 in) MG 131 machine guns

- Bombs: 1,000 kg (2,200 lb) of bombs could also be carried externally.
