= Hans Amtmann =

German-American aircraft designer

- Born: Hans Henry Amtmann; October 15, 1906; Enge-Sande, Schleswig-Holstein, Germany
- Died: February 20, 2007 (aged 100); Santa Fe, New Mexico
- Citizenship: United States
- Education: State Technical College, Germany
- Occupations: Architect and aircraft designer
- Years active: 1934-1984
- Employers: Junkers; Hamburger Flugzeugbau (1934-1945); US Government (1946-1951); Consolidated Vultee (1951-1961); General Atomic (1961-1981)
- Known for: Member of Operation Paperclip
- Spouse: Margret Amtmann (m. 1934–2004)
- Children: 2
- Awards: War Merit Cross (1941)

Hans Henry Amtmann (October 15, 1906 – February 20, 2007) was a German-American aircraft designer. He was best known for his work at Blohm & Voss, where he worked as Head of New Projects under Chief Designer Richard Vogt during the World War II era. After the war, he moved the United States as part of Operation Paperclip, where he worked on a variety of projects.

== Early years ==
Hans Amtmann was born in Sande, on the outskirts of Bergedorf, near Hamburg in Schleswig-Holstein, Germany, in October 1906. He was the second of two brothers. From the age of nine he was educated at the Hansa School. During this time he learned to play the violin, before moving on to study naval architecture at the State Technical College in Hamburg. In his final term he took a course in aeronautics.

== German aeroplane designer ==
After only one month working as a naval architect, Amtmann was offered a position as an aircraft designer at Junkers in Dessau. He worked on the wings of the G 38 and Ju 52 all-metal transports, and on in-flight refuelling, rocket-assisted take-off and preliminary design work. There he also met Hermann Pohlmann, who would go on to design the famous Ju 87 Stuka or dive-bomber before eventually becoming Amtmann's superior in another company.

In 1933, Amtmann moved to Heinkel at Warnemünde on the shores of the Baltic Sea, where he worked on the fuselage of the He 70 transport before becoming involved once again on new project work.

Wanting to return to Hamburg, Amtmann obtained a position as an aircraft designer at the newly established Hamburger Flugzeugbau, under the design leadership of Richard Vogt. He started work there as one of Vogt's first recruits, early in 1934, and was soon appointed Head of Preliminary Design. He would remain there, working on Vogt's great range of unconventional and ingenious ideas, throughout its official renaming as a subsidiary of Blohm & Voss shipbuilders, until it was shut down at the end of World War II in 1945. Due to the workload on Vogt, Amtmann's old colleague Pohlmann would later also join B&V as Deputy Chief Designer, so becoming his immediate superior.

Hans and Margret Amtmann married on 10 October 1934. He had known her since his days as a naval architect. The couple had four children: three boys and a girl. In 1941, he was awarded the War Merit Cross for his outstanding aircraft work.

Amtmann was subsequently appointed project engineer for the proposed Blohm & Voss BV 237 stuka or dive-bomber attack aircraft, which had been personally approved by Hitler, but the order was obstructed by others and the work delayed until the war ended. He also took over and led the design of the P 200 transatlantic passenger flying boat project for Deutsche Luft Hansa, with the intention of building it when the war was over. The BV 40 interceptor glider, flown in prototype form, gave him experience of the prone pilot position, which would help his later career. Immediately after the factory was shut down at the end of hostilities, B&V kept a core design team together in rented rooms at a museum. But money soon ran out and Amtmann took a teaching job.

== Operation Paperclip ==
External image
- Engineer Hans Amtmann before a flight test of the prone position in the nose of a Boeing B-17

In October 1946, he left his teaching job, having been recruited under the American Operation Paperclip to work in the US. Vogt would also be recruited, but Pohlmann would stay behind and later help to resurrect the Hamburger Flugzeugbau. Amtmann was sent to Wright Field, where he resumed work on a prone pilot bed, working for the biomedical facility under H. T. E. "Ed" Hertzberg.

Amtmann developed a patent control system for the pilot and the bed was test flown in a Boeing B-17 Flying Fortress bomber and later in a Lockheed F-80E Shooting Star jet fighter. During this work he also developed a protective shield for the pilot's helmet during emergency ejection which was widely adopted. Another invention was a flying fuel tank system in which the fuel tank glider was attached to the wing tips in parasite configuration. By a coincidence his erstwhile Chief, Richard Vogt, was also at Wright Field and came up with the same idea, beating Amtmann to the patent office.

His family were eventually allowed to come over from Germany and join him early in 1948, but he did not become a legal immigrant until 1 January 1949. The filing of immigration paperwork had to be carried out at a border crossing, so the "Operation Paperclip" migrants were taken in batches, under military escort, across the Canadian border at Niagara Falls and then walked back over the bridge into the US, where they signed their immigration papers. He signed US citizenship papers in March. He escorted the rest of his family on the same exercise several months later and they received their papers in 1950.

Amtmann left US Government employment in 1951, to work for Consolidated Vultee in San Diego, California, in his old role of preliminary design. He worked on the Atlas ICBM system. Following a company separation of aero and missile divisions, under the new company name of Convair he developed the P6Y flying boat for the US Navy, but they withdrew the requirement. He was also involved in the Convair series of supersonic delta-winged jets, proposing his own design for a four-engined seaplane similar to, but larger than, the Convair F2Y Sea Dart.

Made redundant in 1961, he joined General Atomic and worked on the Orion space propulsion system, which proposed using a controlled sequence of nuclear explosions to propel the spacecraft. He also worked on atomic-powered gas turbines.

He moved to a small company working on nuclear fusion power in 1980, until the company closed in 1984.

== Retirement and death ==
Amtmann retired in 1984, following closure of the nuclear fusion company. During his time in California he had joined a small orchestra in which he once again played the violin. He wrote up his memoirs which were published in 1988 as The Vanishing Paperclips: America's Aerospace Secret – a Personal Account. He appeared in the 1995 TV film documentary The Last Days of World War II.

Hans Amtmann died at the age of 100, on 20 February 2007.
