= Blohm & Voss Ae 607 =

Ae 607

General information
- Type: Fighter
- Manufacturer: Blohm & Voss
- Designer: Thieme
- Status: Design project

The Blohm & Voss Ae 607 was a jet-powered flying wing design drawn up by Blohm & Voss in 1945. Very little is known about it and its existence was only confirmed in 2017.

== Background ==
Early in 1945, a Blohm & Voss (B&V) aircraft designer called Thieme began work on Drawing Number Ae 607, within the standard drawing numbering system at B&V. His design for a jet fighter was radically different from anything that B&V had done before. A flying wing, it approximated to a 45° delta planform.

Reports of its existence were not confirmed until 2017, when the drawing was published. No project number is recorded for the design and its intended status is unknown.

== Design ==
An all-wing design, the centre section has a V-shaped lower profile deepening its keel and is sharply tapered both front and rear, while the outer sections are sharply swept at approximately 45° and tapered, giving the leading edge a sweep greater than 45° and the trailing edge an M-shaped outline from above. The wing tips are turned down, giving them a slight anhedral.

A jet engine duct runs down the centre, with the Heinkel-Hirth HeS 011 engine installed towards the rear. A small tail fin is placed above the jet exhaust duct, while the pilot's cockpit is set just in front of the engine, but still well aft, and is offset to one side to give the pilot room alongside the intake duct. It is covered by a teardrop canopy. Two small, low aspect ratio and untapered canard foreplanes sweep forward from either side of the nose intake.

The undercarriage comprises main wheels retracting outwards and twin tailwheels retracting on either side of the engine exhaust duct. On the ground, it sits with a marked nose-up attitude.

The aircraft's estimated performance is unknown.

== Specification ==
Data from Masters, 1982

General characteristics

- Crew: 1
- Length: 7.4 m (24 ft 3 in)
- Wingspan: 7.8 m (25 ft 7 in)
- Powerplant: 1 × Heinkel-Hirth HeS 011 turbojet, 12.75 kN (2,866 lbf) thrust

Armament

- Guns: 3 x 30 mm cannon.
