= Hamburger Flugzeugbau Ha 137 =

1930s German aircraft type

Ha 137
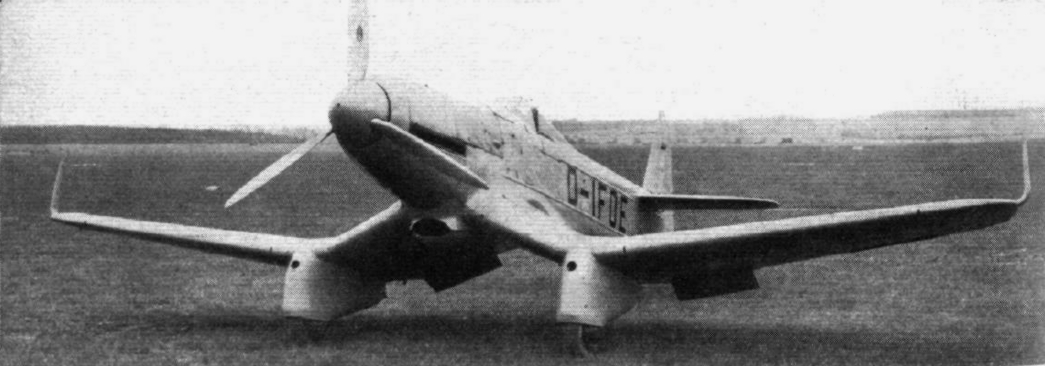
- Ha 137 V5

General information
- Type: Dive bomber
- Manufacturer: Hamburger Flugzeugbau
- Number built: 6

History
- Manufactured: 1935–1937
- First flight: 18 January 1935

The Hamburger Flugzeugbau Ha 137 was a German ground-attack aircraft of the 1930s. It was Blohm & Voss' entry into the contest to equip the re-forming Luftwaffe with its first purpose-built dive bomber. Although the contest would eventually be won by the Junkers Ju 87, the Ha 137 demonstrated that B&V's Hamburger Flugzeugbau, not even two years old at this point, had a truly capable design team of its own. One Ha 137 single-seat prototype competed against the Henschel Hs 123 at Rechlin.

== Design and development ==
Hamburger had already designed a biplane trainer of no particular distinction, the Ha 135 under its first designer, Reinhold Mewes. Mewes then left to join another small company, Fieseler. In his place, Hamburger hired Richard Vogt, who had been working for a decade with Kawasaki Aircraft and was looking to return to Germany. Before leaving Japan, Vogt had been working on a new design for building wing spars, using a single chrome-plated steel tube (often square or rectangular) that formed both the middle portion of the wing and also served as a primary fuel tank.

When tenders were offered for the dive bomber program in 1934, Hamburger was not even invited to submit an entry. Nevertheless, Vogt was convinced that his new construction method would deliver an aeroplane of the required strength with better performance than traditional designs, so he started work on Projekt 6 and submitted it anyway. He also started work on a more conventional biplane design as Projekt 7.

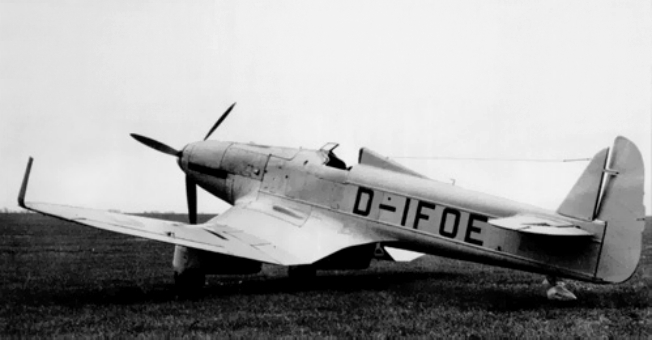
Blohm & Voss Ha 137 V5.

Projekt 6 was essentially a scaled-up version of Vogt's last design at Kawasaki, the Kawasaki Ki-5. Built entirely of metal and using a semi-monocoque fuselage, the design looked more like a fighter - specifically like the Heinkel He 112 - than a dive bomber. The wing used the tubular spar system, the inner portion of which was sealed as a fuel tank holding 270 L (70 US gal). The design used fixed landing gear, so in order to reduce their length and their resulting drag, the wings featured a sharp inverted gull wing bend at about 1/4 span. The wheels were mounted on two shock absorbers each, so the fairing around the gear was large enough to allow the mounting of a 7.92 mm (.312 in) MG 17 machine gun for testing, and a 20 mm MG FF cannon if required. Two additional 7.92 mm (.312 in) MG 17s were mounted in the fuselage decking above the engine.

Engines proved to be more of a problem. Vogt originally submitted the design mounting the new BMW XV. The future of this engine was in doubt, however, and the Reich Air Ministry (RLM) asked for the design to be resubmitted with the 485 kW (650 hp) Pratt & Whitney Hornet radial engine, then starting licensed production in Germany as the BMW 132. Vogt's team then modified the design to use the Hornet as Projekt 6a, or alternately the Rolls-Royce Kestrel as Projekt 6b. The RLM found the resulting design interesting enough to fund construction of three prototypes.

The Hornet-powered Ha 137 V1 first flew in April 1935, followed the next month by the V2, and both were shipped to Travemünde that summer. It quickly became apparent that the Hornet engine was so large that visibility during diving was greatly affected, and the RLM then suggested that the third prototype be completed as a 6b with the Kestrel, delaying it slightly to change the engine mounts and add a somewhat odd-looking radiator under the nose. By this point the definitive requirements for the dive bomber program had been drawn up, taken directly from Junkers' description of its own entry which had already been selected to win, calling for a two-seater arrangement. The Ha 137 was thus excluded, although realistically no other design had a chance to win anyway.

The RLM was nevertheless interested enough in the design to order another three prototypes with the new Junkers Jumo 210 engine. The radial-powered versions retroactively became known as the Ha 137A, while the inline-powered versions became the Ha 137B. Further testing continued during 1936, and the prototypes also took part in the "doomed" dive bomber contest in June 1936, but the design was still being considered for the close support role instead of dive bomber. However, when Ernst Udet took over the T-Amt later that year, he considered the close support role unnecessary, and informed Hamburger Flugzeugbau that it should stop work on the design.

The three Jumo-powered prototypes were built anyway during 1936 and 1937, eventually being used as testbed aircraft at Blohm & Voss. V1 was destroyed in testing during 1935 when the ammunition for its guns exploded, and V6, D-IDTE, crashed in July 1937, but the remaining four were used for years until a lack of spare parts for their engines eventually grounded them.

Vogt had also done some work on a navalized version of the design as Projekt 11; however, the additional weight of the landing equipment, or floats as in the 11b, dramatically reduced range and made the design unfeasible.

== Specifications (Ha 137 V4) ==
Data from

General characteristics

- Crew: one
- Length: 9.45 m (31 ft 0 in)
- Wingspan: 11.15 m (36 ft 7 in)
- Height: 2.8 m (9 ft 2 in)
- Wing area: 23.5 m^{2} (253 sq ft)
- Aspect ratio: 5.29
- Empty weight: 1,814 kg (3,999 lb)
- Gross weight: 2,415 kg (5,324 lb)
- Powerplant: 1 × Junkers Jumo 210Aa V-12 liquid-cooled piston engine, 440 kW (590 hp) for take-off, 455 kW (610 hp) at 2,600 m (8,500 ft)
- Propellers: 3-bladed metal propeller

Performance

- Maximum speed: 297 km/h (185 mph, 160 kn) at 2,000 m (6,600 ft)
- Cruise speed: 290 km/h (180 mph, 160 kn) at 2,000 m (6,600 ft)
- Range: 575 km (357 mi, 310 nmi)
- Service ceiling: 7,000 m (23,000 ft)
- Rate of climb: 8.33 m/s (1,640 ft/min)
- Time to altitude: 2,000 m (6,600 ft) in 4 minutes, 4,000 m (13,000 ft) in 9 minutes (both values without external load)
- Wing loading: 102.8 kg/m^{2} (21.1 lb/sq ft)
- Power/mass: 0.18kW/kg (0.11hp/lb) at take-off, 0.19kW/kg (0.11hp/lb) at 2,600 m (8,530 ft)

Armament

- Guns:
- 2 x 7.92 mm (0.312 in) MG 17 machine guns in the forward fuselage decking
- 2 × 7.92 mm (0.312 in) MG 17 machine guns or 2 × 20 mm (0.787 in) MG FF cannon in undercarriage fairings
- Bombs:
- 4 × 50 kg (110.2 lb) SC50 bombs

== See also ==
Related lists

- List of Interwar military aircraft
- List of military aircraft of Germany
