= Blohm & Voss P 163 =

Proposed German bomber

P 163

General information
- Type: Bomber
- National origin: Germany
- Manufacturer: Blohm & Voss
- Designer: Richard Vogt
- Status: Design proposal

The Blohm & Voss P 163 was a design project for an unconventional bomber during World War II. Constructed mainly from steel, its crew were accommodated in large wingtip nacelles, giving it a triple-fuselage appearance. Its propeller drive system was also unusual, with the central fuselage containing twin engines coupled to a front-mounted contra-prop.

== Design ==
The P 163 was one of several highly unusual bomber configurations studied by the Blohm & Voss aircraft division under Chief Designer Richard Vogt. It was developed in response to a 1942 Luftwaffe requirement for a Heinkel He 111 replacement.

The primary structure was of welded sheet steel, in order to avoid using the strategically important light alloys which were in short supply.

Its main fuselage was unmanned but otherwise conventional, having a tractor propeller and conventional tail, with the tailplane mounted part way up the fin. The tail section and control surfaces were to be made of fabric-covered wood. A shallow indent on the underside allowed for carriage of a semi-recessed bomb load.

The lightly tapered, unswept wing was mounted low on the fuselage and its inner section housed the retractable main undercarriage. A large nacelle was mounted on each wing tip. also of armoured steel, and each housing two crew fore and aft, with additional gun positions. This unusual arrangement was designed to provide the pilot with maximum visibility and the gunners with maximum field of fire. Heavy defensive armament such as mixed 20 mm guns and 30 mm cannon was proposed.

The distribution of weight outboard also improved the span loading of the wing, reducing the bending forces at the roots by an estimated 44% and allowing a lighter structure.

To test the asymmetric pilot's position, one wing tip of a Blohm & Voss BV 141 was fitted with an experimental nacelle. Pilots found it sufficiently intuitive to use, although it was not fitted with flight controls.

The propulsion system was also unconventional. The propeller was contra-rotating and driven by two coupled engines located in the fuselage immediately behind it. Two variants were studied in parallel, having different powerplants but being otherwise almost identical.

The P 163.01 had a Daimler-Benz DB 613C based on two DB 603 series inline engines located side by side. The P 163.02 was given the more powerful BMW 803A based on two BMW 801 series radials placed back to back.

Various offensive bomb loads were considered, between 2,000 kilograms (4,400 lb) and 2,500 kilograms (5,500 lb). Large bombs would be recessed into the fuselage, while multiple smaller bombs would be carried under the wing, inboard of the undercarriage.

== Specification (P 163.01) ==
Data from Pohlmann (1982)

General characteristics

- Crew: 4
- Length: 15.15 m (49 ft 8 in)
- Wingspan: 20.73 m (68 ft 0 in)
- Height: 3.6 m (11 ft 10 in)
- Wing area: 55.30 m^{2} (595.2 sq ft)
- Empty weight: 9,400 kg (20,723 lb)
- Gross weight: 15,200 kg (33,510 lb)
- Powerplant: 1 × Daimler-Benz DB 613C 24-cyl. liquid-cooled twin inline piston engine, 2,833 kW (3,799 hp)

Performance

- Maximum speed: 510 km/h (320 mph, 280 kn) at 7,000 metres (23,000 ft)
- Range: 2,500 km (1,600 mi, 1,300 nmi)
- Service ceiling: 10,000 m (33,000 ft)
- Wing loading: 275 kg/m^{2} (56 lb/sq ft)

Armament

- Guns: multiple MG 151 installations
- Bombs: 2,000 kg

== See also ==
- Blohm & Voss P 170
