= Arado E.560 =

Bomber plane

Ar E.560
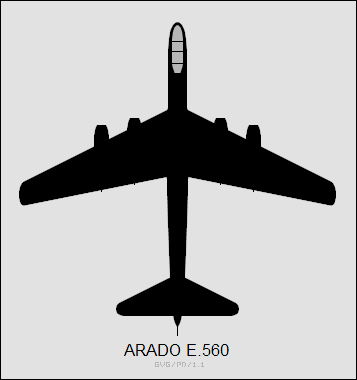
- Ar E.560 11

General information
- Type: Tactical bomber
- Designer: Arado
- Status: project only
- Primary user: Luftwaffe (intended)

History
- Developed from: Arado Ar 234

The Arado E.560 was a multi-engined Arado medium-range jet tactical bomber proposed during the Second World War.

== History ==
The Arado E.560 designs were a development based on the Arado 234, and they share some characteristics with that plane.

Only four designs of E.560 variants have survived; the remaining are unknown. Except for one variants which was propeller-driven, the other three E.560 designs were to have been powered by turbojets. They were all equipped with retractable tricycle undercarriage.The E.560, like many other advanced German jet bomber projects, did not progress past the design phase.

== Variants ==
All of the Arado E.560 variants had a pressurized cockpit for a crew of two, located at the front end of the fuselage.

=== Ar E.560 4 ===
Four-engined bomber project powered by turbojet engines. The wings were swept back.

Data from Dieter Herwig & Heinz Rode, The Luftwaffe Secret Projects: Strategic Bombers 1935–1945. Midland Counties Publ. ISBN 978-1857800920

General characteristics

- Crew: two
- Length: 19.1 m (62 ft 8 in)
- Wingspan: 18 m (59 ft 1 in)
- Height: 5.4 m (17 ft 9 in)
- Wing area: 48 m^{2} (520 sq ft)
- Gross weight: 17,000 kg (37,479 lb)
- Powerplant: 4 × BMW 003E Turbojet engines

Performance

- Maximum speed: 900 km/h (560 mph, 490 kn)
- Range: 2,300 km (1,400 mi, 1,200 nmi)

Armament

- Guns: 2 fixed 30 mm MK 103 guns at the cockpit end and 2 periscope operated 30 mm MK 103 guns at the tail end
- Bombs: 3,000 kg

=== Ar E.560 PTL ===
Smaller two-engined bomber project powered by turboprop engines. It had swept back wings.

Data from Dieter Herwig & Heinz Rode, The Luftwaffe Secret Projects: Strategic Bombers 1935–1945. Midland Counties Publ. ISBN 978-1857800920

General characteristics

- Crew: two
- Wingspan: 23.5 m (77 ft 1 in)
- Height: 3.95 m (13 ft 0 in)
- Gross weight: 18,800 kg (41,447 lb)
- Powerplant: 2 × BMW 028 Turboprop engines

Performance

- Maximum speed: 920 km/h (570 mph, 500 kn)
- Combat range: 3,400 km (2,100 mi, 1,800 nmi)

Armament

- Bombs: 4,000 kg

=== Ar E.560 8 ===
Six-engined bomber project powered by turbojet engines. It had swept back wings.

Data from Dieter Herwig & Heinz Rode, The Luftwaffe Secret Projects: Strategic Bombers 1935–1945. Midland Counties Publ. ISBN 978-1857800920

General characteristics

- Crew: two
- Length: 18 m (59 ft 1 in)
- Wingspan: 23.2 m (76 ft 1 in)
- Height: 3.95 m (13 ft 0 in)
- Powerplant: 6 × BMW 003 Turbojet engines

Performance

- Maximum speed: 920 km/h (570 mph, 500 kn)
- Combat range: 3,400 km (2,100 mi, 1,800 nmi)

Armament

- Bombs: 3,000 kg

=== Ar E.560 11 ===
Four-engined bomber project powered by turbojet engines. It had swept back wings.

Data from Dieter Herwig & Heinz Rode, The Luftwaffe Secret Projects: Strategic Bombers 1935–1945. Midland Counties Publ. ISBN 978-1857800920

General characteristics

- Crew: two
- Length: 19.1 m (62 ft 8 in)
- Wingspan: 24 m (78 ft 9 in)
- Height: 5.1 m (16 ft 9 in)
- Gross weight: 28,600 kg (63,052 lb)
- Powerplant: 4 × BMW 018 Turbojet engines

Performance Armament

- Guns: 2 fixed 20 mm MG 151 cannons at the cockpit end and 2 fixed 20 mm MG 151 cannons, as well as a periscope-controlled MG 151 rear-firing cannon with 400 rounds, at the tail end
- Bombs: 4,000 kg

== See also ==
Aircraft of comparable role, configuration, and era

- Blohm & Voss P 188

Related lists

- List of German aircraft projects, 1939–45
- List of jet aircraft of World War II
