= FGP 227 =

Research german flying boat

General information
- Type: Research Flying boat
- National origin: Germany
- Manufacturer: FGP (Czech)
- Status: Prototype
- Number built: 1

History
- First flight: September 1944

The FGP 227 was a scale flying model of the Blohm & Voss BV 238 flying boat, built to provide data for the development of the BV 238.

== Design and development ==
The proposed Blohm & Voss BV 238 flying boat was to have an advanced hull design which had never been tried before. The Czech Flugtechnische Fertigungsgemeinschaft Prag (FGP) was engaged to build a quarter-scale test aircraft.

The FGP 227 was a faithful, approximately quarter-scale model of the proposed design, having a long, narrow hull with a high-mounted wing and conventional tail. The pilot sat in a front cockpit and the flight test observer in another one aft of the wing. Power was supplied by six 15.7 kW (21 hp) ILO F 12/400 air-cooled two-stroke engines driving three bladed propellers, mounted along the wings.

The model was completed early in 1944, registered as BQ+UZ and fitted with a temporary wheeled undercarriage of ten small wheels fitted with low-pressure tyres.

== Operational history ==
Intended to allow flight tests to commence from the manufacturers airfield, the FGP 227 refused to take-off from the grass airfield. The aircraft was dismantled and transported to Erprobungsstelle See, Travemünde (E-Stelle - flying boat testing station). During transport French prisoners of war loading the wing onto flat-bed trucks allowed it to fall from a crane causing damage which was not repaired until September 1944.

Flight tests commenced in September 1944 as soon as the repairs were completed, but all six engines stopped due to fuel starvation soon after take-off, resulting in a heavy landing on the water. The FGP 227 was again repaired after which the aircraft flew several more times. By this time construction and testing of the BV 238 had started, so no useful data was gleaned from the programme.

== Specifications (FGP 227) ==
Data from Green

General characteristics

- Crew: 2
- Length: 11.95 m (39 ft 2 in)
- Wingspan: 15.25 m (50 ft 0 in)
- Height: 3.54 m (11 ft 7 in)
- Wing area: 24.24 m^{2} (260.9 sq ft)
- Empty weight: 1,250 kg (2,756 lb)
- Gross weight: 1,640 kg (3,616 lb)
- Powerplant: 6 × ILO F 12/400 air-cooled two-stroke piston engines, 15.7 kW (21.1 hp) each
- Propellers: 3-bladed fixed pitch propellers

== See also ==
- Blohm & Voss
