= Blohm & Voss P 170 =

Proposed German three-engine bomber

BV P 170
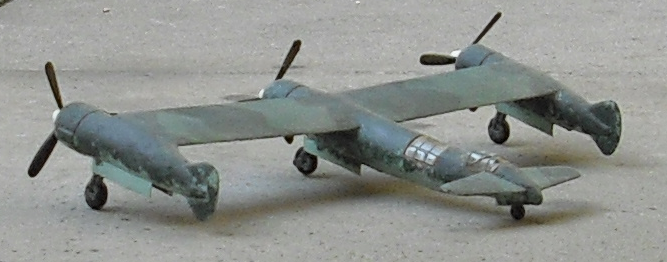
- P 170 scale model

General information
- Type: Bomber
- Manufacturer: Blohm & Voss
- Designer: Richard Vogt
- Status: Project abandoned
- Number built: 0

The Blohm & Voss P 170 was a three-engined unarmed fast bomber and ground-attack aircraft project proposed by the aircraft manufacturer Blohm & Voss to the Luftwaffe during the Second World War.

== Design ==
Designed by Richard Vogt in 1942, the P 170 was intended to meet a requirement for a schnellbomber, a bomber capable of outrunning contemporary interceptors, and which would then not need any defensive armament. Accommodating a crew of two, it was to have been powered with three BMW 801D radial engines. Three different configurations were proposed, two with the bomb aimer buried in the fuselage ahead of the pilot, with or without additional side windows, and the other with the gunner behind the pilot under a continuous greenhouse type canopy, but none were built.

The layout was unusual, with two of the three engines mounted on the wingtips of the straight untapered shoulder-mounted wing. To balance so much weight ahead of the wing, the crew were moved as far aft as possible in the cylindrical fuselage to a tandem cockpit just ahead of the tailplane. The outer engine nacelles were each fitted with a small tail fin and rudder. The outboard location distributed the aircraft weight across the span, reducing the stress loads and weight of the wing structure. Steel was to be used extensively throughout its construction, with wooden control surfaces.

The main undercarriage comprised three identical retractable units just behind each engine and retracting up underneath the main fuel tanks. A single relatively large tailwheel retracted up behind the cockpit.

== Specifications ==
Data from The Luftwaffe Secret Projects: Ground Attack & Special Purpose Aircraft (2004)

General characteristics

- Crew: two
- Length: 13.00 m (42 ft 8 in)
- Wingspan: 16.00 m (52 ft 6 in)
- Height: 3.65 m (12 ft 0 in)
- Wing area: 44.00 m^{2} (473.6 sq ft)
- Empty weight: 9,100 kg (20,062 lb)
- Gross weight: 13,300 kg (29,321 lb) with normal 1,000 kg (2,200 lb) bombload
- Fuel capacity: 2,800 L (620 imp gal; 740 US gal)
- Powerplant: 3 × BMW 801D or E air-cooled radial piston engines, 1,390 kW (1,860 hp) each

Performance

- Maximum speed: 820 km/h (510 mph, 440 kn) at 8,000 m (26,000 ft)
- Range: 2,000 km (1,200 mi, 1,100 nmi) at 6,000 m (20,000 ft)
- Service ceiling: 10,400 m (34,100 ft)

Armament

- Guns: No guns fitted
- Rockets: 12 x RZ 65 rockets in two external packs in lieu of bombs.
- Bombs: 1 × SC 1000 bomb or 2 × SC 500 bombs or 4 × SC 250 bombs normal loadout, or double this at overload.

== See also ==
- List of German aircraft projects, 1939–45

Aircraft of comparable role, configuration and era

- Blohm & Voss P 163
- de Havilland Mosquito
