= Hamburger Flugzeugbau HFB 209 =

Type of aircraft

HFB 209

General information
- Type: Medium transport
- National origin: Germany
- Manufacturer: Hamburger Flugzeugbau
- Status: Design project

The Hamburger Flugzeugbau HFB 209 was a postwar design project for a twin-turboprop medium-range transport.

It was cancelled when the German government decided to fund only international collaborations.

== History ==
The HFB 209 was in effect a development of the CASA C-207 Azor.

In 1958 HFB proposed to the German Government two new transports, the HFB 209 turboprop and the HFB 314 short-range jet transport. But government finance was not made available and HFB could not progress without it.

== Design ==
The HFB 209 was a conventional low-wing monoplane intended as a 48-54 seat short-to-medium haul turboprop airliner.

The fuselage, including the large underfloor freight compartment, was pressurised to 25,000 feet (7,600 m)

The relatively large wing was of two-spar construction, with fuel tankage accommodated between the spars.

Two Napier Eland turboprops were fitted in wing-mounted nacelles and drove reversible-pitched propellers. The main wheels of the tricycle undercarriage retracted up into the nacelles behind the engines.

The surplus power available from the engines, rated at 3,500 ehp for takeoff, together with the low wing loading and large, low-pressure tyres, gave good short- and rough-field performance.

== Specification ==
Data from Flight (1957)

General characteristics

- Capacity: 48 to 54 seats
- Length: 23.32 m (76 ft 6 in)
- Wingspan: 28.55 m (93 ft 8 in)
- Height: 9.04 m (29 ft 8 in)
- Wing area: 89.5 m^{2} (963 sq ft)
- Empty weight: 10,910 kg (24,052 lb)
- Max takeoff weight: 20,450 kg (45,085 lb)
- Powerplant: 2 × Napier Eland NEl.6 turboprop, 2,600 kW (3,500 shp) each

Performance

- Cruise speed: 513 km/h (319 mph, 277 kn) at 66,000 ft (20,000 m)

== See also ==
Related development

- CASA C-207 Azor
- Hamburger Flugzeugbau HFB 314

Aircraft of comparable role, configuration, and era

- Convair 340
- Vickers Viscount
