= Hamburger Flugzeugbau Ha 136 =

Type of aircraft

Ha 136

General information
- Type: Trainer
- National origin: Germany
- Manufacturer: Hamburger Flugzeugbau
- Designer: Richard Vogt
- Number built: 2

History
- First flight: Autumn 1934

The Hamburger Flugzeugbau Ha 136 was an all-metal, single-seat training monoplane. It was the first design for the company by Dr. Richard Vogt and the first to feature his trademark tubular steel wing spar which doubled as the main fuel tank. Two prototypes were built but it was not ordered into production.

== Design ==
Hamburger Flugzeugbau had been set up by the owners of Blohm & Voss shipbuilders to manufacture advanced all-metal aircraft. Dr. Richard Vogt had decided to adopt as a signature feature the use of a hollow welded steel tubular main wing spar, which could be filled with fuel to act as an armoured fuel tank. In other respects the design was relatively conventional.

A conventional low-wing cantilever monoplane with nose-mounted engine and fixed spatted tailwheel undercarriage, the plane accommodated its pilot in an open cockpit above the wing aft section. The fuselage tapered sharply towards the top so that a slight bulge on either side of the cockpit was needed to make room for the pilot's shoulders.

Two examples were produced, differing mainly in their engines. One was fitted with a 160 hp (119 kW) Bramo Sh 14A radial engine and the other with an Argus As 8R in-line engine.

== History ==
The Ha 136 was designed to a requirement for an advanced fighter trainer that was as difficult to fly as a frontline fighter.

The aircraft first flew in the autumn of 1934 and the fighter-like handling characteristics were confirmed.

However, the RLM changed its mind and decided that advanced fighter training should be carried out on the fighter aircraft themselves. The requirement for the Ha 136 was dropped, and so it never entered production.

== Specifications ==
Data from Pohlmann (1982) Note: Dimensions measured from drawing.

General characteristics

- Crew: 1
- Length: 5.6 m (18 ft 4 in)
- Wingspan: 6.6 m (21 ft 8 in)
- Height: 2.3 m (7 ft 7 in)

Performance

- Wing loading: 70 kg/m^{2} (14 lb/sq ft)
