= Hamburger Flugzeugbau HFB 314 =

HFB 314

General information
- Type: Medium transport
- National origin: Germany
- Manufacturer: Hamburger Flugzeugbau
- Status: Design project

The Hamburger Flugzeugbau HFB 314 was a postwar design project for a twin-turbojet medium-range transport. It was cancelled when the German government decided to fund only international collaborations.

== History ==
In 1958 HFB proposed to the German Government two new transports, the HFB 209 turboprop and the HFB 314 short-range jet transport. The 314 would be a direct competitor to the French Sud Aviation Caravelle, then already under development. Although the German government was initially willing to negotiate over financing the projects, in the end they decided that the German aircraft industry should not develop its own designs but should instead collaborate with other countries. Finance was never made available and HFB could not progress without it. With the competing Boeing 727 and de Havilland DH.121 Trident both also advancing steadily, HFB abandoned the project in 1960.

== Design ==
The HFB 314 was a conventional swept-wing monoplane intended as a 70-78 seat short-to-medium range jet airliner.

The upper fuselage accommodated the crew cockpit and passenger cabin, while the lower half correspondingly housed the nosewheel and cargo bays. The tail was of T type, with the tailplanes attached on either side of an anti-shock fairing on top of the fin. The fairing delayed the onset of shockwaves and accompanying drag increase at high cruising speeds.

The relatively sharply swept wing was mounted low on the fuselage, with the carry-through structure passing between the cargo holds. The inner wing sections were more sharply swept and tapered, and housed the main undercarriage mechanism which retracted inwards so that the wheels lay in the fuselage.

Two Rolls-Royce RB 141/11 turbojets were fitted in blisters protruding from either side of the rear fuselage, with alternatives offered including the General Electric CJ-805-23 or Pratt & Whitney JT3D-3.

== Specification ==
Data from Flight (18 November 1960)

General characteristics

- Capacity: 70-78 seats
- Length: 36 m (119 ft)
- Wingspan: 28 m (93 ft)
- Height: 8.18 m (26 ft 10 in)
- Wing area: 114 m^{2} (1,230 sq ft)
- Empty weight: 20,865 kg (46,000 lb)
- Max takeoff weight: 40,415 kg (89,100 lb)
- Powerplant: 2 × Rolls-Royce RB.141/11 turbojet

Performance

- Maximum speed: 951 km/h (591 mph, 514 kn) Cruise at 36,000 feet (11,000 m)
- Range: 4,250 km (2,640 mi, 2,290 nmi) max. fuel condition.

== See also ==
Related development

- Hamburger Flugzeugbau HFB 209

Aircraft of comparable role, configuration, and era

- Boeing 727
- De Havilland DH.121 Trident
- Sud Aviation Caravelle
