= Blohm & Voss Ha 140 =

Floatplane

Ha 140
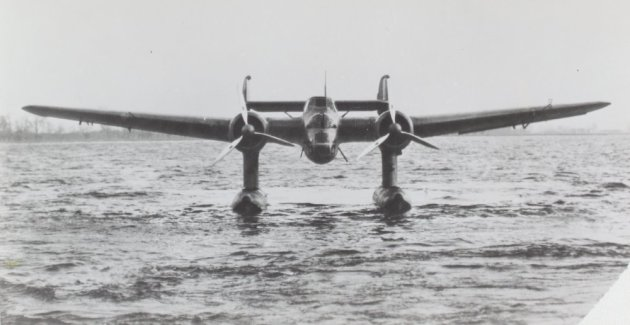
- An Ha 140 afloat

General information
- Type: Torpedo bomber
- Manufacturer: Blohm & Voss (Hamburger Flugzeugbau)
- Designer: Richard Vogt
- Number built: 3

History
- Manufactured: 1937–38
- First flight: 30 September 1937

The Blohm & Voss Ha 140 was a German multi-purpose seaplane first flown in 1937. It was intended for use as a torpedo bomber or long-range reconnaissance aircraft but did not enter production.

== Design and development ==
The Ha 140 was developed to meet a requirement for a twin-engine floatplane reconnaissance/torpedo bomber.

The Ha 140 had an all-metal structure of conventional cantilever monoplane layout, with twin floats on pylons beneath its twin wing-mounted engines. The high-mounted wing had a straight centre section and slight dihedral on the outer sections.

The crew consisted of a pilot and radio operator, with a gunner in a revolving turret in the nose or in a second gun position to the rear. The torpedo or bomb load was accommodated in an internal bomb bay.

Three prototypes were built and the design beat the competing Heinkel He 115. However, by then B&V did not have enough spare manufacturing capacity for series production and declined the order, which went to Heinkel instead.

In 1940 the third prototype was modified to test the tail design and variable-incidence wing mechanism used on the BV 144 transport.

== Specifications (Ha 140 V2) ==
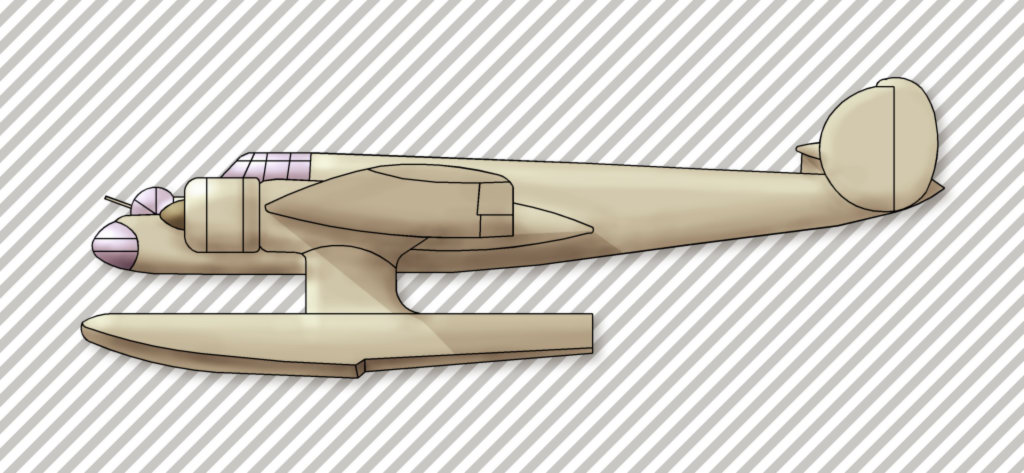

Data from Aircraft of the Third Reich

General characteristics

- Crew: 3
- Length: 16.75 m (54 ft 11 in)
- Wingspan: 22 m (72 ft 2 in)
- Height: 3.05 m (10 ft 0 in)
- Wing area: 92 m^{2} (990 sq ft)
- Empty weight: 6,300 kg (13,889 lb)
- Gross weight: 8,500 kg (18,739 lb)
- Max takeoff weight: 9,230 kg (20,349 lb)
- Fuel capacity: 2,365 L (520 imp gal)
- Powerplant: 2 × BMW 132K 9-cylinder air-cooled radial piston engines, 597 kW (801 hp) each for take-off, 619 kW (830 hp) at 1,000 m (3,300 ft)
- Propellers: 3-bladed variable-pitch propellers

Performance

- Maximum speed: 320 km/h (200 mph, 170 kn) at sea level
  333 km/h (207 mph) at 3,000 m (9,800 ft)
- Cruise speed: 295 km/h (183 mph, 159 kn) at 85% power at sea level
- Range: 1,150 km (710 mi, 620 nmi)with 2,365 L (520 imp gal) of fuel
- Ferry range: 2,000 km (1,200 mi, 1,100 nmi) with 2,365 L (520 imp gal) of fuel
- Service ceiling: 5,000 m (16,000 ft)
- Time to altitude: 3,000 m (9,800 ft) in 11 minutes 30 seconds
  5,000 m (16,000 ft) in 39 minutes
- Wing loading: 92.4 kg/m^{2} (18.9 lb/sq ft)
- Power/mass: 0.140 kW/kg (0.085hp/lb)

Armament

- Guns: 1× 7.92 mm (0.312 in) MG 15 machine gun in nose, 1× MG 15 machine gun at dorsal hatch
- Bombs: 1× 952 kg (2,099 lb) torpedo or 4× 250 kg (551 lb) bombs

== See also ==
Related lists

- List of Interwar military aircraft
- List of military aircraft of Germany
- List of flying boats and floatplanes
