= Blohm & Voss Ha 142 =

German monoplane

Ha 142
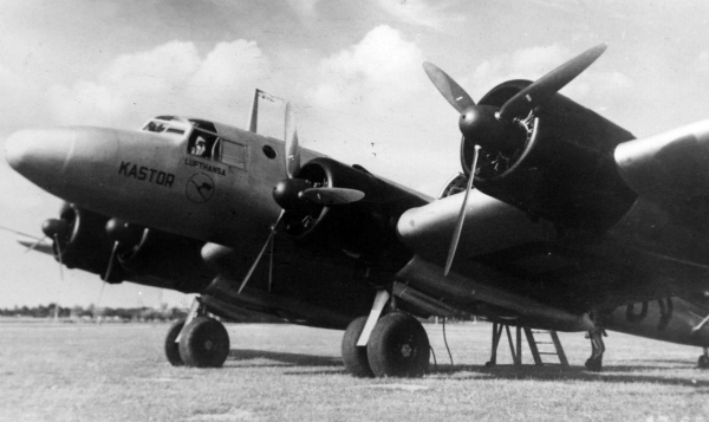
- Blohm & Voss Ha 142 V1

General information
- Type: Long-range maritime patrol / transportation aircraft
- Manufacturer: Blohm & Voss
- Primary user: Luftwaffe
- Number built: 4

History
- Introduction date: Autumn 1940
- First flight: 11 October 1938
- Retired: 1942
- Developed from: Blohm & Voss Ha 139

The Blohm & Voss Ha 142 was a four-engined long-distance monoplane designed and built by the German aircraft manufacturer Blohm & Voss.

It was developed as a land-based derivative of the Ha 139 seaplane during the late 1930s; considerable attention was paid to the needs of the German flag carrier Luft Hansa, who sought such an aircraft to work its transatlantic airmail service. On 11 October 1938, the first of several prototypes made its maiden flight. It was evaluated by Luft Hansa, but no regular airmail services were ever operated by the Ha 142, a fact that can largely be attributed to the outbreak of the Second World War.

In response to the conflict, two of the existing aircraft were converted for their use by the Luftwaffe, being outfitted with a new glazed nosecone and armed with multiple defensive machine guns and a modest bombing capacity. The Ha 142 participated in various theatres, including the invasion of Denmark, the Norwegian campaign, and Occupied France. It was largely used for maritime reconnaissance and transport duties. Allegedly, on account of their disappointing performance, both of the converted aircraft were withdrawn from service prior to 1942, while the fate of the two unconverted aircraft is not recorded.

== Development ==
Shortly after testing of the Blohm & Voss Ha 139 seaplane had commenced in 1937, work commenced on a land-based derivative, which would receive the Ha 142 designation. From the onset of the project, this derivative was to incorporate as much of the design and components of the Ha 139 as realistically possible. The Ha 142 was also intended to be operated on transatlantic airmail runs, although it is uncertain whether it was interest within the German flag carrier Luft Hansa or within the design team itself that had primarily driven the project's launch.

On 11 October 1938, the first prototype performed its maiden flight. It was quickly followed by the second prototype. A total of four prototypes were produced, all of which were flight-worthy by mid 1939. The Ha 142 was evaluated by Luft Hansa, however, it reportedly did not impress reviewing officials. However, the outbreak of the Second World War effectively ended development of the project as a civilian initiative.

== Design ==
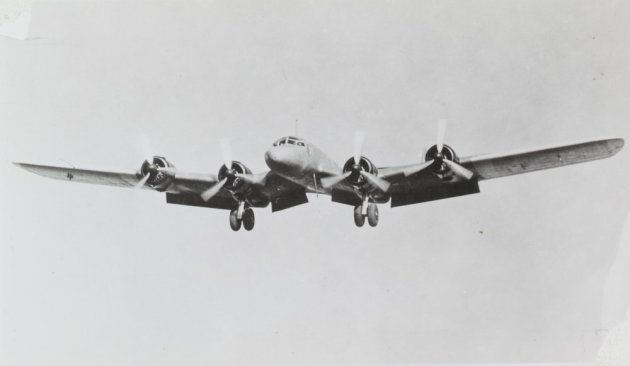
Ha 142 in flight, circa 1940

The Ha 142 was an undercarriage-equipped version of the Blohm & Voss Ha 139 seaplane, most closely resembling the Ha 139B. Akin to its predecessor, its general configuration consisted of an oval fuselage with a low-mounted inverted gull wing that bore four engines, while the tail unit comprised a high-set horizontal stabilizer and a double vertical tail. The Ha 142 was powered by a total of four BMW 132H-1 air-cooled radial engines. The inboard engines had elongated nacelles so that the main undercarriage could retract backwards into alcoves set within them.

The center section of the wing was strengthened by a typical Blohm & Voss cross-girder which consisted of a large-diameter pipe. This transverse tube, which was divided internally into five sections, also acted as a fuel tank. The center of the wing had a metal covering while the outer sections of the wing were fabric-covered. There were six hydraulically-operated flaps in the mid-wing. The fuselage was of metal and had an approximately circular cross-section. Each main landing gear leg was furnished with dual wheels and was fully retractable, as was the tail wheel. The landing gear was both lowered and retracted using hydraulic power.

Various modifications were performed to adapt the Ha 142 for military use during the Second World War. An extended nose section was fitted that had extensive glazing (resembling the Heinkel He 111H-6 in this respect) while the addition of a sixth crew member was necessitated via the installation of various navigation aids and military radio apparatus. Furthermore, provisions for its use as a bomber were also incorporated, such as the installation of an ordinance compartment within the fuselage, although the aircraft had a relatively small payload capacity of 400 kg. Multiple defensive armaments were also added, including a 7.92 mm/.312 in MG 15 machine gun in the nose, twin-beam positions, a ventral cupola, and an electrically-powered dorsal turret.

== Operational history ==
During the summer of 1939, the Ha 142 was briefly trialled by Luft Hansa as a mail transport. It was never placed into regular service with the operator, in part due to the outbreak of the Second World War shortly thereafter.

Months into the conflict, it was proposed to convert the four prototypes, along with the Ha 139, into long-range maritime patrol aircraft; conversion work started with the first two aircraft. The first converted aircraft was operationally ready by early 1940, although it was not officially delivered to the Luftwaffe until the latter half of that year. It is believed that only the first two HA 142s were ever converted; the increased weight of the aircraft post-conversion negatively impacted its performance.

During the spring of 1940, all four Ha 142s participated in the German invasion of Denmark and the Norwegian campaign. Specifically, two were flown in the aerial reconnaissance role by KüFlGr 406 and 2./AuKlGr ob d L, while the other two were used for logistical support with KGzbV (Special combat team) 108; it is also recorded that two Ha 142s were briefly operated in the troop transport capacity with KGrzbV 105.

Both V1 and V2 were used operationally from late 1940 to 1942 and operated by 2./Aufklärungsgruppe (AuKlGr) ob d L. This unit was assigned to the operations staff of Luftflotte 3 in France. However, their performance was disappointing, the type only undertook a handful of missions prior both being withdrawn from service by 1942. The ultimate fate of the unconverted V3 and V4 is unknown. At one point, plans were mooted for both V1 and V2 to be used to carry the Henschel GT-1200C guided torpedo; the Ha 142 was considered to be a favourable platform for this new weapon due to the ample ground clearance of its fuselage due to its inverted gull wing. However, no such carriage ever took place as this project was ultimately cancelled.

== Specifications (BV 142 V2/U1) ==
Data from Aircraft of the Third Reich : Volume One

General characteristics

- Crew: Six
- Length: 20.48 m (67 ft 2 in)
- Wingspan: 29.53 m (96 ft 11 in)
- Height: 4.44 m (14 ft 7 in)
- Wing area: 130 m^{2} (1,400 sq ft)
- Empty weight: 11,080 kg (24,427 lb)
- Max takeoff weight: 16,560 kg (36,509 lb)
- Powerplant: 4 × BMW 132H-1 nine-cylinder air-cooled radial piston engines, 647 kW (868 hp) each for take-off
- Propellers: 3-bladed bladed variable-pitch propeller

Performance

- Maximum speed: 373 km/h (232 mph, 201 kn) at sea level
- Cruise speed: 325 km/h (202 mph, 175 kn) at 2,000 m (6,600 ft)
- Range: 3,900 km (2,400 mi, 2,100 nmi) maximum with no bombload
- Service ceiling: 9,000 m (30,000 ft)
- Rate of climb: 6.67 m/s (1,300 ft/min)

Armament

- Guns: 5 × 7.92 mm (0.312 in) MG 15 machine guns
- Bombs: 4 × 100 kg (220 lb) bombs or 8 × 50 kg (110 lb) bombs

== See also ==
Related lists

- List of World War II military aircraft of Germany
- List of military aircraft of Germany
