= Blohm & Voss BV 144 =

1945 prototype airliner by Blohm & Voss

BV 144
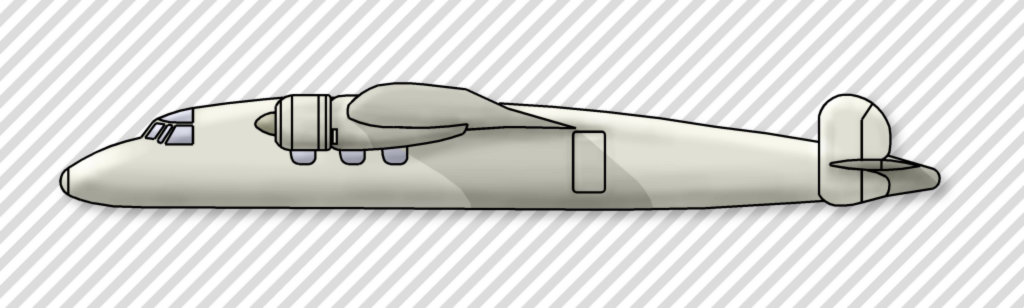
- Profile drawing of the Bv 144

General information
- Type: Airliner
- Manufacturer: Blohm & Voss; Breguet
- Primary user: French Air Force
- Number built: 2

The Blohm & Voss BV 144 was an advanced twin-engined commercial airliner developed by the German aircraft manufacturer Blohm & Voss. While a pair of prototypes was completed, no production aircraft were ever produced.

Development of the BV 144 commenced at the behest of the German flag carrier Deutsche Luft Hansa during the early years of the Second World War; from the onset, it was intended to be a civil airliner for use during the postwar era as a successor to the Junkers Ju 52. The BV 144 incorporated numerous advanced and uncommon features for the era, including the use of a variable-incidence wing, de-icing apparatus, and tricycle landing gear. Despite these innovations, it had an orthodox general configuration.

In response to an initial order from Deutsche Luft Hansa, a pair of prototypes was built by the French aircraft company Breguet during the German occupation of France; the first prototype performed its maiden flight in August 1944. However, Blohm & Voss's involvement in the project ceased later that same year when German forces were pushed out of France. It has been claimed that, following the conflict's end, one of these prototypes received French Air Force markings and was used as the private aircraft of President Charles de Gaulle.

== Development ==
During 1940, by which point the Second World War was already being waged in Europe, the German flag carrier Deutsche Luft Hansa approached the aircraft manufacturer Blohm & Voss with a request for it to design and produced a new twin-engined airliner. This new airliner was intended to be relatively advanced, capable of seating up to 18 passengers in spacious accommodation, and function as a suitable successor to the ubiquitous Junkers Ju 52 transport aircraft. From the onset, it was envisioned that the prospective aircraft would be able to introduced by Deutsche Luft Hansa shortly after the conflict would come to an end; at that point in time, the war was going in Germany's favour and planning for post-war services was considered to be reasonable.

The company opted to produce a response to the requirement, which led to its design team devising what would be designated the BV 144. The airline was reportedly impressed with the resulting design, particularly in respect to its safety features, and placed an initial order for a pair of prototypes to be produced. Blohm & Voss lacked any production capacity to pursue peacetime projects; it was Ernst Udet of the Reichsluftfahrtministerium (RLM/German Aviation Ministry) who suggested that the BV 144 could be built by the French aircraft manufacturer Breguet, based in Bordeaux, who had no work following the Fall of France to Germany in June 1940. Accordingly, Breguet's designers went to work in the B&V offices to complete the airliner's detail design work.

Near to the end of the conflict, a pair of prototypes was completed. During August 1944, the first prototype, BV 144 V1, made its maiden flight. Germany was in full retreat by this point and thus Blohm & Voss's involvement in the project effectively ceased when German forces were driven from France. Initially, French authorities elected to continue work on the project. At least one aircraft received French Air Force markings. According to the aeronautical engineer Hans Amtmann, one of these aircraft was used by President Charles de Gaulle as his private aircraft for a time. France ultimately opted not to proceed with quantity production of the type.

== Design ==
The BV 144 was an all-metal cantilever monoplane of broadly conventional layout with a high-mounted wing and twin tail fins. It was to have been typically operated by a crew of three; the pilot and copilot were located within a stepped cockpit while the radio operator was in a separate compartment just aft. Behind the radio operator's compartment was the forward freight hold, toilet, passenger compartment, and the rear freight hold. The passenger compartment could seat up to 23 passengers in less spacious conditions than the 18-seat configuration favoured by Deutsche Luft Hansa.

The BV 144 incorporated a particularly unusual feature for the era in the form of a variable-incidence wing; an electro-mechanical mechanism would rotate the wing by its main spar by up to 9°. Accordingly, the wing's angle of attack could be altered when flying at low speeds (such as on approach to landing) without impacting the attitude of the fuselage or negatively affecting airflow over the aircraft's twin-fin tail unit. Other advantages provided by the variable-incidence wing included favourable visibility for the pilot and the elimination of any blanketing of the flight control surfaces. This wing mechanism had already been test flown on an Ha 140 floatplane. Furth features present to ease landings included the presence of lengthy slotted flaps, which were supplemented by drooping the ailerons.

Other atypical design choices included the early use of a tricycle (nosewheel) landing gear arrangement, which ensured the comfort of the passengers by maintaining a level fuselage during takeoff and also allowed for the fuselage to sit relatively low to the ground for ease of boarding. The main units landing gear would retract inwards into the wing. The adoption of a de-icing system (using heated air fed from an onboard oil burner) in the leading edges of both the wing and tail unit was another novel feature for the era. The BV 144 was powered by a pair of wing-mounted BMW 801 MA radial engines, each one capable of generating up to 1,147 kW (1,538 hp).

== Specifications (BV 144 V1) ==
Data from Aircraft of the Third Reich, Hitler's Luftwaffe

General characteristics

- Crew: 3
- Capacity: 18-23
- Length: 21.8 m (71 ft 6 in)
- Wingspan: 27 m (88 ft 7 in)
- Height: 4.75 m (15 ft 7 in)
- Wing area: 88 m^{2} (950 sq ft)
- Empty weight: 7,900 kg (17,417 lb)
- Max takeoff weight: 13,000 kg (28,660 lb)
- Powerplant: 2 × BMW 801A 14-cylinder two-row air-cooled radial piston engines, 1,147 kW (1,538 hp) each for take-off at sea level
- Propellers: 3-bladed variable pitch

Performance

- Maximum speed: 470 km/h (290 mph, 250 kn)
- Range: 1,550 km (960 mi, 840 nmi)
- Service ceiling: 9,100 m (29,900 ft)

== Bibliography ==
- Amtmann, Hans H. (1988). The Vanishing Paperclips: America's Aerospace Secret: A Personal Account. Boylston, MS: Monogram. ISBN 0-914144-35-9.
- Green, William (2010). Aircraft of the Third Reich (1st ed.). London: Aerospace Publishing Limited. ISBN 978-1-900732-06-2.
- Smith, J. Richard; Kay, Anthony L. (1978). German Aircraft of the Second World War. London: Putnam. ISBN 0-370-00024-2.
- Wood, Tony; Gunston, Bill (1977). Hitler's Luftwaffe. London: Salamander. ISBN 0-86101-005-1.
