= Hamburger Flugzeugbau Ha 135 =

Type of aircraft

Ha 135
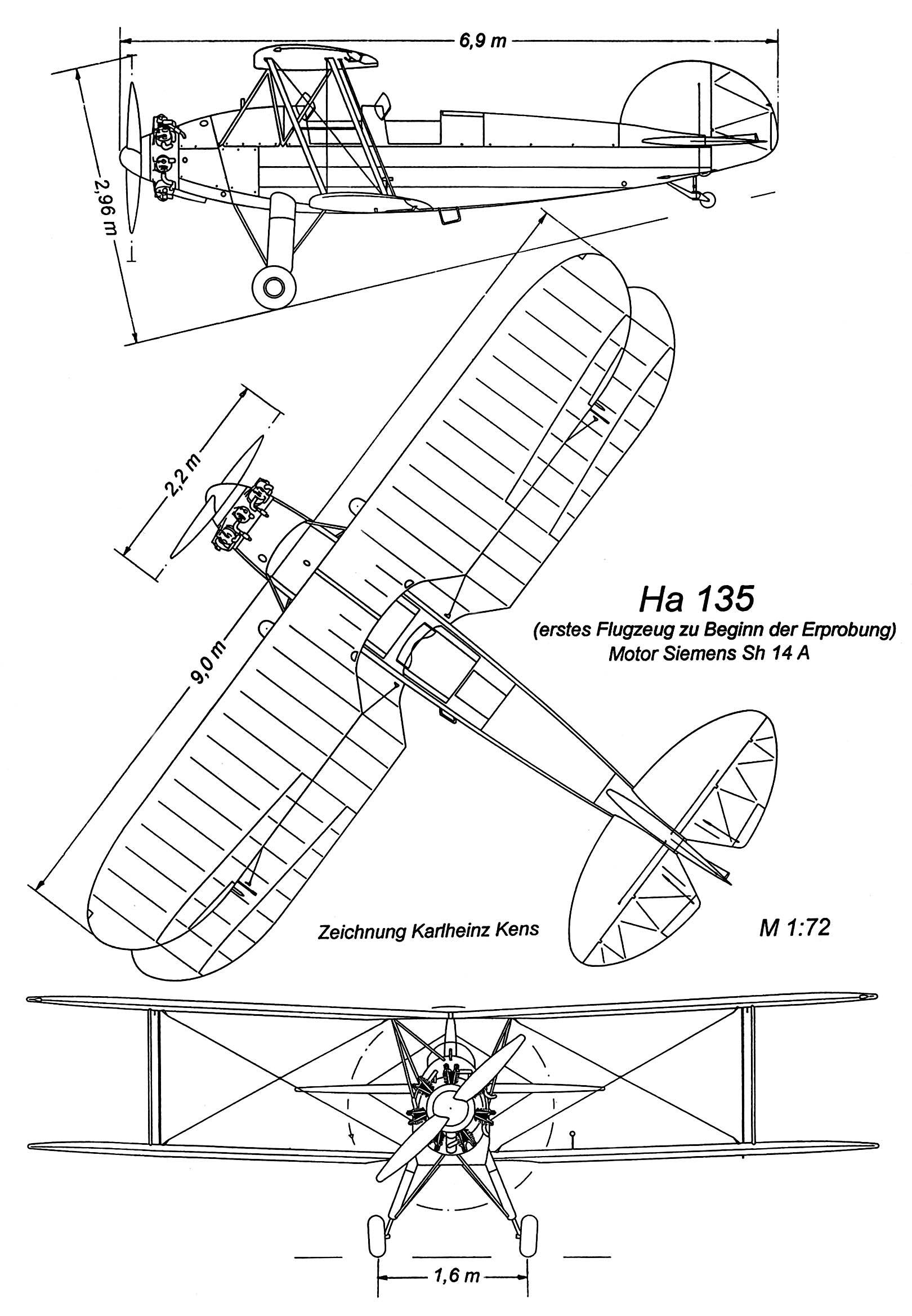

General information
- Type: Trainer
- National origin: Germany
- Manufacturer: Hamburger Flugzeugbau
- Number built: 6

History
- First flight: 28 April 1934

The Hamburger Flugzeugbau Ha 135 was the first aircraft produced by the new aircraft subsidiary of the German company Blohm & Voss.

== Development ==
The two-seat biplane manufactured by the Hamburger Flugzeugbau subsidiary of Blohm & Voss was a means of giving the company experience in making modern metal components for civil and military aircraft. It was developed as a trainer for the German Ministry of Aviation. After it proved unsuccessful in this role, the company sold it as a sport aircraft.

== Operational history ==
The first prototype, designated the Ha 135 V1 (company production number 101, registration D-EXIL), made its first flight on 28 April 1934. After the company used it for flight development with a BMW-Bramo Sh 14A engine installed, the German Air Sports Association flew it as a sport aircraft.

The second prototype, designated the Ha 135 V2 (company production number 102, registration D-EKEN), made its first flight on 30 April 1934. The Hamburger Flugzeugbau used it for flight characteristics and performance tests beginning on 14 July 1934. It also later flew as a sport aircraft with the German Air Sports Association.

Hamburger Flugzeugbau manufactured four more Ha 135s before production ceased.

== Specifications ==
Data from Die Deutsche Luftruestung 1933-1945 Vol.1 - AEG-Dornier

General characteristics

- Crew: 1 or 2
- Length: 6.83 m (22 ft 5 in)
- Wingspan: 9.9 m (32 ft 6 in)
- Empty weight: 520 kg (1,146 lb)
- Gross weight: 860 kg (1,896 lb)
- Powerplant: 1 × BMW-Bramo Sh 14A , 120 kW (160 hp)

Performance

- Maximum speed: 205 km/h (127 mph, 111 kn)
- Range: 795 km (494 mi, 429 nmi)
- Service ceiling: 5,750 m (18,860 ft)
