= Blohm & Voss BV 238 =

1944 military flying boat by Blohm & Voss

BV 238
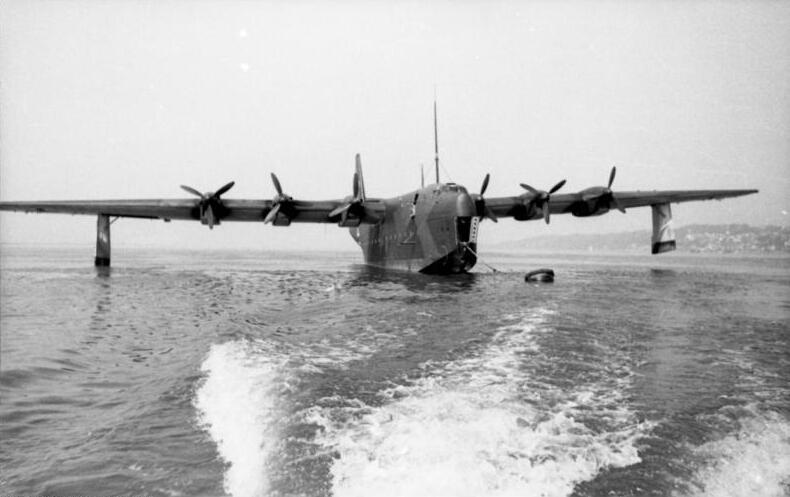
- The prototype BV 238 V1 in June 1944

General information
- Type: Flying boat
- National origin: Nazi Germany
- Manufacturer: Blohm & Voss
- Status: Retired
- Primary user: Luftwaffe
- Number built: 1 (with 2 incomplete prototypes)

History
- First flight: March 1945

The Blohm & Voss BV 238 was a large six-engined flying boat designed and built by the German aircraft manufacturer Blohm & Voss. Developed during the Second World War, it was the heaviest aircraft ever built when it first flew in 1944, and was the largest aircraft produced by any of the Axis powers during the conflict.

Development of the BV 238 started in January 1941 in response to a Reichsluftfahrtministerium (RLM/German Aviation Ministry) request for a long range multipurpose flying boat. The resulting design drew upon the firm's existing large six-engined flying boat, the BV 222 Wiking, but was considerably larger and featured numerous refinements, such as to its elevator and float configuration. To gather flight data on its proposed configuration, a quarter-scale model, the FGP 227, was commissioned, but was so delayed that it provided little benefit. The company received an order for four prototypes, the construction of which commenced during January 1944.

During March 1945, flight testing of the first prototype commenced. Two months later, this prototype was sunk while moored at Lake Schaal after being strafed by Allied aircraft. While recovery was thought to be possible, the end of the conflict and the refusal of the Allies to permit continued aircraft development in Germany at that time meant that work on the programme was abandoned. This included work on a land-based derivative of the flying boat, designated BV 250, which ultimately never flew.

== History ==
At the start of the Second World War, the design team at the German aircraft manufacturer Blohm & Voss were largely preoccupied by the development of the BV 222 Wiking, a large six-engined flying boat. However, during 1940, the firm's designer opted to start work on an even larger flying boat under the designation P 200 that would be suitable for the future long distance routes (particularly transatlantic ones) of the German flag carrier Deutsche Luft Hansa. Furnished with eight engines, this vast flying boat was anticipated to have had a loaded weight of 200,000 kg (440,925 lb), a range of 8,600 km (5,300 mi) and a passenger capacity of 120.

During January 1941, work on the P.200 proposal was suspended in order to focus on the fulfilment of a new request issued by the Reichsluftfahrtministerium (RLM/German Aviation Ministry) for a long range multipurpose flying boat. In the following months, the design team worked on an initial four-engined design for what would become the BV 238, however, it was abandoned by mid 1941 due to the lengthy timescale involved in developing suitable domestic engines to power it. Instead, in July 1941, work commenced on a fresh design that, while being considerably larger than the BV 222, shared numerous features as well as its general layout. This design was warmly received and a development order calling for the completion of four prototypes was promptly issued to the firm.

While its similarities to the BV 222 meant that some useful data could be obtained from this existing flying boat, it was felt that some aspects were too dissimilar for this arrangement to be fully sufficient. Accordingly, an approximately quarter-scale model of the BV 238 was commissioned to test the long and slim hull design, which was largely original. Built by the Flugtechnische Fertigungsgemeinschaft GmbH (FGP) in Prague and designated FGP 227, this scale model did not arrive (as a result of several factors, including sabotage and damage sustained during its maiden flight) until September 1944, too late to contribute any data to the program.

During 1942, the construction of the various jigs and components for the BV 238 commenced; fabrication of the first hull started in January 1944. Production work continued even as many other aircraft programmes were cancelled due to Germany's declining position in the conflict; one factor in this decision was that, aside from the materials involved, little of the BV 238's supply chain competed with that of fighter aircraft production. Although extensive defensive armament was planned, the first prototype, BV 238 V1, lacked any upon its completion in March 1945 (these armaments were planned to be installed at a later date). While the flying boat had been designed to fulfil a military specification, the design team had undertaken some work towards its prospective civilian applications as well.

By the end of March 1945, after completed only four test flights, BV 238 V1 was declared to be fit for service. After only two months of flights, this aircraft was strafed and partially sunk while moored on Lake Schaal, several miles to the east of Hamburg. One wing remained above water, which was later salvaged. Following the end of the conflict, the Allies refused to let the flying boat be restored so it was taken out to deeper water and sunk. Two additional flying boats were mid-construction, but these were also never completed.

== Design ==
The BV 238 was an extremely large flying boat of conventional aerodynamic design, but bearing the usual B&V structural hallmarks of all-metal construction with a tubular steel wing main spar which also functioned as the armoured main fuel tank. Of the era, only the earlier Tupolev ANT-20, the Martin XPB2M-1 and the later Hughes H-4 had a bigger wing span. However, the BV 238 would be the heaviest yet flown, at 100 tonnes (220,000 lb) fully loaded.. Principal differences between the BV 238 and the preceding BV 222, aside from the formerly greater size and some hydrodynamic improvements, included a revised elevator and an alternative float arrangement.

The hull had an unusually long and slim planing bottom, of essentially two-step design but with a row of smaller auxiliary steps behind the main one. A large nose door opened onto its cavernous interior, with the main crew cabin immediately above and behind it. For ease of production, design features were kept relatively simple while no use of magnesium was made for any part of the airframe.

The wing was of straight, constant-chord form with tapered outer sections. Auxiliary floats were integrated into underside panels of the outer sections and could be retracted to lie flush with the wing. A catwalk ran internally along the wing in front of the tubular steel main spar, providing access to the engines in flight. It was powered by six Daimler-Benz DB 603 liquid-cooled inverted V12 piston engines, capable of producing up to 1,287 kW (1,750 hp). These engines were installed in nacelles that were arranged along the leading edge of the wing's centre section.

== Variants ==
BV 250
A landplane version, initially referred to as the BV 238-Land, was proposed; it was to be capable of carrying out transport, long-range bombing and transatlantic reconnaissance duties.

The lower hull was replaced by a plain fairing with retractable undercarriage comprising twelve main and two nose wheels. A single bomb bay occupied the space between the wheel bays while another was located directly behind the main undercarriage. The wing floats were similarly replaced with retractable outrigger stabilising wheels. The nose wheel could be folded up, making the aircraft "kneel" and allowing vehicles to drive directly on- and off-board via a loading ramp to the nose doorway. Alternatively, passenger seating could be fitted. A further, upper deck behind the crew cockpit accommodated further passengers, bringing the total capacity to 300 troops.

Redesignated BV 250 during 1942, four prototypes were ordered but none were finished by the end of the conflict.

BV 250 Zwilling
A twin fuselage variant, known as the BV 250Z (Zwilling - "Twin"), was briefly considered, however left on the drawing board. The only evidence of this design is a Blohm & Voss blueprint of an unknown date. Designated "Blohm & Voss P 167 01-01", it would have been powered by 12 engines, and been the largest aircraft at its time. The role of the aircraft is unknown, it presumably could have been a transport or heavy bomber like its BV 250 counterpart.

== Specifications (BV 238A-02 (V6)) ==
Data from Aircraft of the Third Reich Vol.1, Blohm & Voss Bv 222 "Wiking" – Bv 238

General characteristics

- Crew: 12
- Length: 43.35 m (142 ft 3 in)
- Wingspan: 60.17 m (197 ft 5 in)
- Height: 12.8 m (42 ft 0 in)
- Wing area: 360.16 m^{2} (3,876.7 sq ft)
- Empty weight: 54,780 kg (120,769 lb)
- Gross weight: 90,000 kg (198,416 lb) for reconnaissance missions

95,000 kg (209,000 lb) for bomber missions

- Max takeoff weight: 100,000 kg (220,462 lb)
- Powerplant: 6 × Daimler-Benz DB 603G inverted V-12 liquid-cooled piston engines, 1,417 kW (1,900 hp) each for take-off
  1,163 kW (1,560 hp) at 7,375 m (24,200 ft)
- Propellers: 3-bladed constant-speed propellers

Performance

- Maximum speed: 350 km/h (220 mph, 190 kn) at 60,000 kg (132,277 lb) weight at sea level

425 km/h (264 mph) at 60,000 kg (130,000 lb) at 6,000 m (20,000 ft)

- Landing speed: 143 km/h (77 kn, 89 mph)
- Range: 6,620 km (4,110 mi, 3,570 nmi) at 365 km/h (227 mph) at 92,000 kg (203,000 lb) at 2,000 m (6,600 ft)
- Service ceiling: 7,300 m (24,000 ft)
- Wing loading: 261 kg/m^{2} (53 lb/sq ft)

Armament

- Guns: 22 guns total (in defensive turrets):

8 × 13 mm (0.512 in) MG 131 machine guns with 1,800 rpg; 4 in each nose and tail turret
8 × 13 mm (0.512 in) MG 131 machine guns with 900 rpg; 4 in each wing mounted turret
4 × 13 mm (0.512 in) MG 131 machine guns with 500 rpg; 2 (as a twinned MG 131Z) in each manually aimed beam/waist position
2 × 20 mm (0.787 in) MG 151/20 autocannon with 1,400 rpg in forward dorsal turret

- Bombs: 20 × 250 kg (551 lb) SC 250 bombs in wing bomb bays

and 4 × 1,000 kg (2,205 lb) SC 1000 bombs on external racks
or 2 × 1,200 kg (2,646 lb) LD 1200 torpedoes on external racks
or 4 × Henschel Hs 293 missiles on external racks, if Bv 238 fitted with FuG 203 Kehl MCLOS guidance transmitter
or 2 × 1,000 kg (2,205 lb) BV 143 glide bombs on external racks

== See also ==
Aircraft of comparable role, configuration, and era

- Blohm & Voss BV 222
- Blohm & Voss P 200
- Kawanishi H8K
- Martin JRM Mars
- Short Shetland
- Hughes H-4 Hercules

Related lists

- List of World War II military aircraft of Germany
- List of flying boats and floatplanes
