= Blohm & Voss Ha 139 =

Floatplane

Ha 139
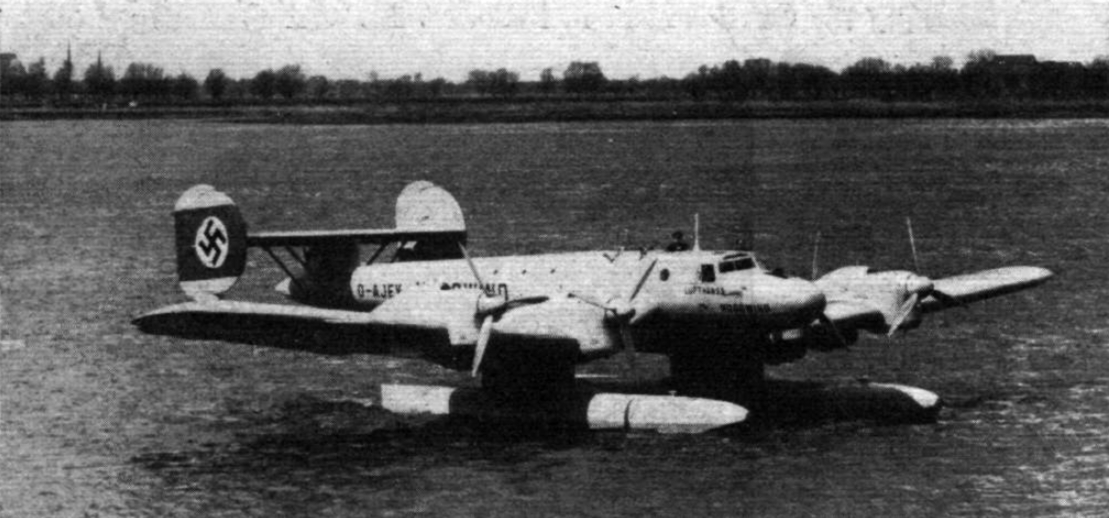
- Ha 139 Nordwind in 1938

General information
- Type: mail/cargo plane
- Manufacturer: Blohm & Voss
- Primary user: Deutsche Luft Hansa
- Number built: 3

History
- Manufactured: 1936–1938
- Introduction date: 1937
- First flight: October 1936
- Variant: Blohm & Voss BV 142

The Blohm & Voss Ha 139 was a four-engined, all-metal, inverted gull wing floatplane, designed and built by the German aircraft manufacturer Blohm & Voss. At the time of the first aircraft's completion, it was one of the largest float-equipped seaplanes to have been built.

Development of the Ha 139 started in 1935 to fulfil a specification issued by the German flag carrier Deutsche Luft Hansa. Built to serve on the airline's long distance routes, it was equipped with four hydraulically-actuated landing flaps, was powered by four Junkers Jumo 205C diesel engines, and was suitable for catapult-assisted takeoffs. The Ha 139A was promptly followed by the Ha 139B, a variant that possessed greater size and weight. Development of the aircraft led to a land-based version, the Blohm & Voss BV 142 and a proposed reconnaissance/bomber variant of the Ha 139 for the Luftwaffe was never realised.

During October 1936, Ha 139 V1, the first aircraft, performed its maiden flight. Between 1937 and 1939, the type was flown by Deutsche Luft Hansa on various transatlantic routes, predominantly in the South Atlantic. Such flights ceased following the start of the Second World War; the aircraft were adopted by the Luftwaffe and used for military purposes during the conflict. Its service life was cut short by a lack of components; no aircraft survived the conflict.

== Design and development ==
During the early 1930s, the Blohm & Voss shipbuilding company in Hamburg was suffering financial hardship due to a prolonged downturn in orders amid the Great Depression affecting global demand; company officials opted to diversify via the creation of a new subsidiary company, Hamburger Flugzeugbau, which specialised in the design and manufacture aircraft. This new company quickly set about the development of its first flying boat, the Blohm & Voss BV 138 Seedrache tri-motor; the project was considered natural for the firm, being owned by a shipbuilding company meant that many staff already had good knowledge of the maritime environment and suitable construction practices, while the company's main complex was sited on the Elbe a large body of water.

During 1935, the firm, having been satisfied with the progress of the Seedrache, decided to embark on design work for a larger four-engined floatplane. From any early stage of development, the prospective aircraft was intended for civilian use by the German flag carrier Deutsche Luft Hansa; the airline's requirements included the carriage of a 500 kg (1,100 lb) payload over a staged 5,000 km (3,100 mi) route at a cruising speed of 250 km/h (160 mph). The aircraft was also to possess a durable structure and good handling (such as being able to take off and alight on rough seas) while also being suitable for catapult-assisted takeoffs.

The design team produced a low-wing monoplane powered by four Junkers Jumo 205C diesel engines and equipped with pylon-mounted floats, called Ha 139. The inboard engines were mounted at the joint between the inboard anhedral and outboard dihedral wing sections above the floats. The parallel-chord inverted gull wing featured a main spar composed of large-diameter steel tubing; this tubular spar also functioned as a fuel tank. This wing, which had a mixed covering made of metal (in the centre) and fabric (on the outer panels), was equipped with four hydraulically-actuated landing flaps. The all-metal single-step floats were attached to the wings via a steel stub that was surrounded by a metal fairing that housed a radiator. The fuselage had a circular cross-section and featured metal monocoque construction. It had a stepped cockpit that was typically occupied by a crew of four, including a pair of pilots, during lengthy flights.

Shortly after testing of the Ha 139 commenced in 1937, Blohm & Voss started work on a land-based derivative the BV 142. This version was to incorporate as much of the design and components of the Ha 139 as possible. While originally intended for civil use, it would ultimately see use by the Luftwaffe during the war.

== Operational history ==
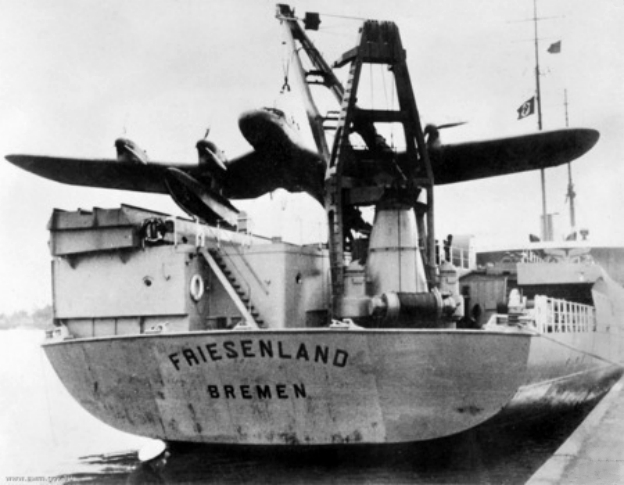
A Ha 139 on board the catapult ship Friesenland.

During March 1937, Deutsche Luft Hansa received the first aircraft, Ha 139 V1; shortly the airline commenced trials in the North Atlantic between the Azores and New York using V1, V2 and a pair of seaplane depot ships. During these flights, the aircraft routinely achieved average cruising speed just shy of the specification but the discovery of several faults led to the trials being temporarily halted in November 1937 for remedial work. These modifications included replacement rudders and fins with counterparts possessing greater surface area (to counteract directional instability) and the elimination of all inner-engine radiators in favour of an under-wing arrangement.

In July 1938, a new round of trials commenced, that included the first Ha 139B aircraft, which possessed increased dimensions and weight as well as lower-mounted engines. Following the completion of trials, regular service commenced during the closing months of 1938. The type was flown by Deutsche Luft Hansa on various transatlantic routes, predominantly in the South Atlantic between Bathurst, The Gambia and Natal, Brazil. When catapult-launched from an aircraft tender, a Ha 139 was capable of transporting up to 500 kg (1,100 lb) of airmail over a distance of up to 5,000 km (3,100 mi).

Shortly following the outbreak of the Second World War, all three aircraft were transferred to the Luftwaffe for military service. Their appearance was altered and modifications made to enable them to perform reconnaissance and minesweeping operations. The included the addition of an elongated and extensively glazed nose to accommodate an observer while a degaussing loop was installed around the aircraft and field-generating apparatus was installed within the fuselage.

Introduced to service during the Norwegian campaign, the militarised Ha 139s transported troops and freight, reconnaissance and minesweeping sorties over the Baltic Sea. The Ha 139 did not have a lengthy military service, in large part due to a lack of spare components. Proposals to produce a reconnaissance–bomber variant of the aircraft were formulated but never put into action.

== Variants ==
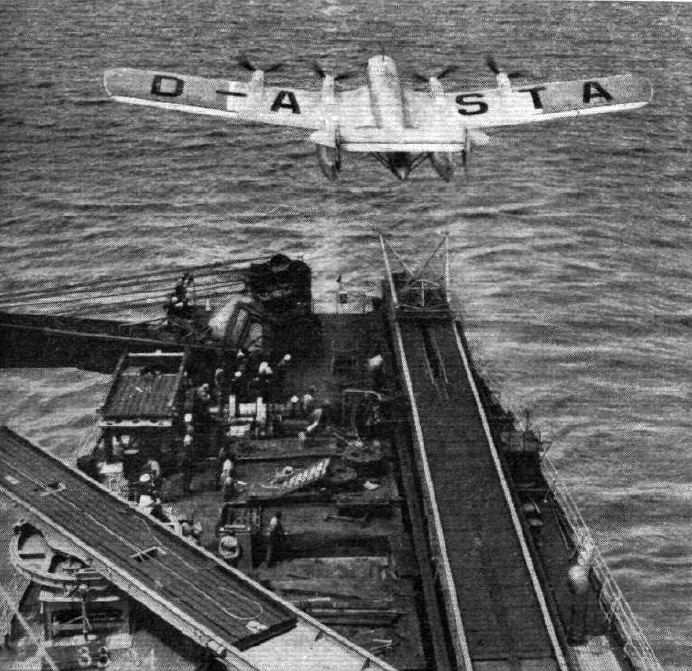
Ha 139 Nordstern leaving the Friesenland in 1938.

Projekt 15
Catapult launched floatplane mail-carrier design for Deutsche Lufthansa (DLH), became the Ha 139.

Projekt 20
A reconnaissance-bomber derivative of Projekt 15 submitted to the Reichsluftfahrtministerium (RLM) (German air Ministry) which generated little interest.

Ha 139 V1
D-AMIE, named Nordmeer — First of two initial prototypes.

Ha 139 V2
D-AJEY, named Nordwind — Second of two initial prototypes.

Ha 139 V3
D-ASTA, named Nordstern — Third prototype with longer wingspan, increased wing area and modified engine mounts.

Ha 139B
The Ha 139 V3 was given new triangular fins, and re-designated while in service with DLH.

Ha 139B/Umbau
After service with DLH, the Ha 139B was modified as the Ha 139B/Umbau with an extended glazed nose accommodating a navigator and a spherical Ikaria mount for a machine-gun. Additional machine guns were mounted in the cockpit roof hatch and in lateral mountings on either side of the rear fuselage.

Ha 139B/MS
The Ha 139B/Umbau was later modified into a minesweeper (Minensuch) with a magnetic cable loosely run between the nose, wing-tips, and tail.

== Specifications (Ha 139B/Umbau) ==
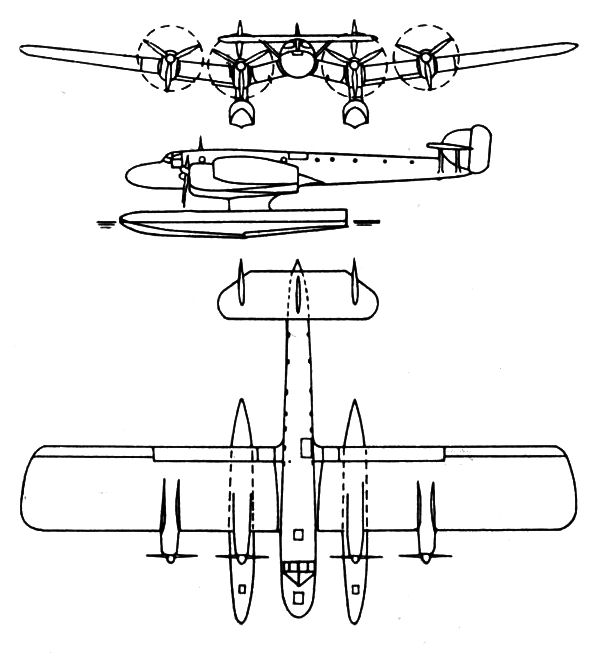
Blohm & Voss Ha 139

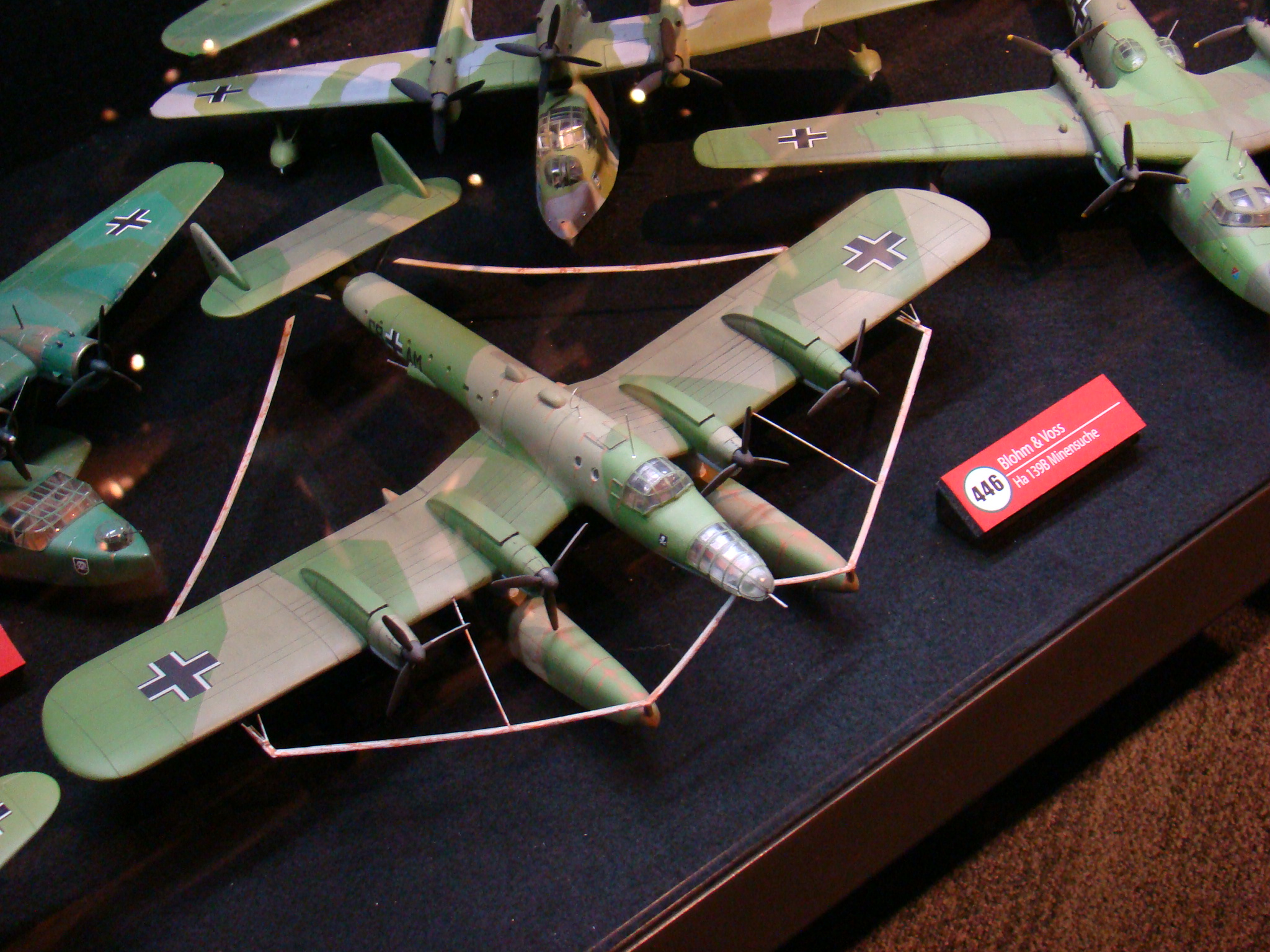
Model of the third prototype in Minensuch (minesweeper) configuration at Museum of Flight

Data from Aircraft of the Third Reich : Volume One

General characteristics

- Crew: 4–5
- Length: 20.07 m (65 ft 10 in)
- Wingspan: 29.5 m (96 ft 9 in)
- Height: 4.8 m (15 ft 9 in)
- Wing area: 130 m^{2} (1,400 sq ft)
- Empty weight: 10,340 kg (22,796 lb)
- Gross weight: 19,000 kg (41,888 lb)
- Powerplant: 4 × Junkers Jumo 205C six-cylinder opposed piston diesel engines, 447 kW (599 hp) each for take-off
- Propellers: 3-bladed variable-pitch metal propellers

Performance

- Maximum speed: 288 km/h (179 mph, 156 kn) at 3,000 m (9,800 ft)
- Cruise speed: 238 km/h (148 mph, 129 kn) (maximum) at 2,000 m (6,600 ft)
- Economical cruise speed: 200 km/h (120 mph)
- Ferry range: 4,600 km (2,900 mi, 2,500 nmi) at 238 km/h (148 mph)

4,950 km (3,080 mi) at 200 km/h (120 mph)

- Rate of climb: 2.8 m/s (550 ft/min)

Armament

- Guns: 4 × 7.92 mm (0.312 in) MG 15 machine guns in nose, flight deck roof hatch, and staggered fuselage lateral mountings

== See also ==
Related lists

- List of flying boats and floatplanes
