= Richard Vogt (aircraft designer) =

German-American aircraft engineer (1894–1979)

Richard Vogt (19 December 1894 – January 1979) was a German-American military aircraft designer who was known for his original airframes, including the asymmetrical BV 141 during World War II. After the war, he moved to the United States as part of Operation Paperclip, where he worked on American military aircraft design.

== Early life ==
Richard Vogt was born in Schwäbisch Gmünd, a town in the Kingdom of Württemberg, which at that time was a constituent state of the German Empire. He was the seventh child of twelve siblings.

He was admitted to a school of universal literacy education in Stuttgart-Cannstatt. When he was a student at the school, he had an opportunity get to know Ernst Heinkel. In 1912, when he was 18 years old, Vogt built his first aeroplane. With the help of a friend and under the eye of Heinkel, he attempted unsuccessfully to fly it just outside Mutlangen, a neighboring town to Schwäbisch Gmünd.

== World War I ==
After school Vogt worked for a year at an engine factory in Ludwigshafen. With the outbreak of World War I, he was conscripted into the military of the German Empire. There he was wounded in action, and medically evacuated back to Germany. Vogt then trained as a pilot in Halberstadt.

== Career ==
On being discharged from military service in August 1916 Vogt found work at the Zeppelin works in Friedrichshafen. While there, he was impressed by Claudius Dornier and determined to become an aircraft designer. After the war, he completed a two-year course at the Technical University in Stuttgart, and subsequently served as an assistant to Professor Baumann at the university's Institute of Aeronautical and Automobile Systems until 1922. During that period he was awarded his first patent and received a doctorate degree.

=== Kawasaki ===
On behalf of Dornier, Vogt was briefly sent to Italy, then in 1923, to Kawasaki in Kobe, Japan, which was a licensed manufacturer of Dornier aircraft. In Japan he was appointed as chief designer, and he trained the young Japanese engineer Takeo Doi to be his successor. Doi later designed the Ki-61 Hien. During that period Vogt designed several types including the KDA-5 Army Type 92 biplane fighter plane, KDA-2 Army Type 88 biplane reconnaissance, KDA-3 single-seat fighter, and (in cooperation with Doi) a modified version of the KDA-5 Army Type 92-I biplane fighter. He stayed with Kawasaki until 1933.

=== Blohm & Voss ===
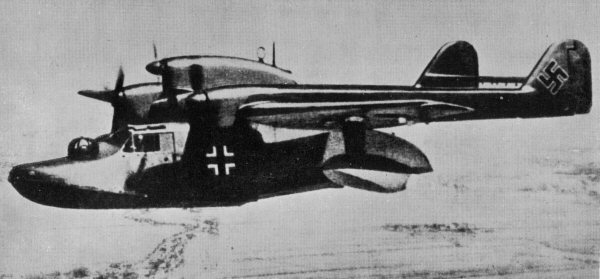
The BV 138 Seedrache (English: Sea Dragon) three-engined patrol flying boat was produced in greater numbers than any other B&V type.

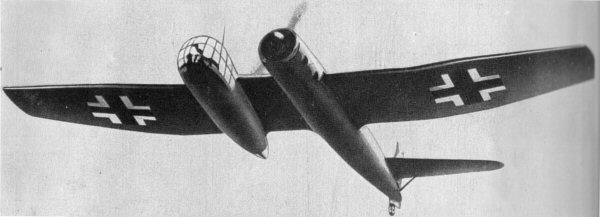
A BV 141 tactical reconnaissance prototype with an unusual asymmetrical shape.

In 1933 he was offered the position of Chief Designer at Hamburger Flugzeugbau, an aircraft manufacturer recently established by Blohm & Voss shipbuilders. During his flight back from Japan he worked on the idea of a tubular steel main wing spar which could also double as an armoured fuel tank. Almost all of his subsequent designs would include this feature.

Vogt's next major innovation was an asymmetric aircraft layout in which the thrust line was offset to one side, allowing the pilot a clear view on the other side. It appeared in the Ha 141 reconnaissance aircraft. Approximately 20 were built.

Shortly before World War II broke out, Hamburger Flugzeugbau was reformed as the aircraft division of Blohm & Voss and changed its name accordingly. The designation of Vogt's aircraft changed from Ha to BV, with many of the types then under development changing their designations, for example the Ha 141 became the BV 141.

Other important, more conventional designs included a series of ever-larger flying boats. The BV 238 was the largest and heaviest aircraft manufactured until the end of the war by any Axis power. Vogt also developed a series of gliding munitions, but the advanced control systems caused problems and although quite large quantities were manufactured, none saw operational service.

His design style was noted by the British journal Aeroplane in the caption to a cartoon:

Richard Vogt, that original man,
Turns out aeroplanes uglier than
Most any other designer can.
Here is shown on Baltic Sea
A typical Vogt monstrosity—

The One-Three-Eight by B. & V.

Vogt's final innovation was a tailless "pfeilflieger" (swept wing) design, well suited to the new jet engines then under development. A series of designs culminated in the P 215 all-weather fighter, which received an order for three prototypes just weeks before the war ended.

=== American "Paperclip" ===
After World War II, Vogt was recruited by the US Air Force under "Operation Paperclip", and he moved to the United States. He worked as a civilian employee for the Research Laboratory of the US Air Force in Dayton, Ohio from the beginning of 1947 to 1954. Later he became the chief designer of the Aerophysics Development Corporation and worked there until the parent company closed the business in 1960.

From August 1960 to August 1966, he served as a staff member on the team of George S. Schairer, who was the chief aerodynamicist in the research and testing division of Boeing. At Boeing, Vogt was involved in the design of vertical takeoff systems and hydrofoils. He also investigated the effect of the length and shape of wings on the flying range, and he proved that small extensions attached to both tips of the wings improved the aerodynamics and increased the operational range of the aircraft. This finding has been widely used in modern aircraft, where the extensions are known as wing tips or winglets. His last assignment was the after-launch evaluation of the design of the Boeing 747.

== Retirement ==
After retiring from Boeing, he enjoyed developing a safe sailboat that would not capsize, and he wrote his memoirs. In 1977 a fire destroyed his house, resulting in the loss of many personal and technical documents.

== Death ==
In January 1979 he died of myocardial infarction in Santa Barbara, California, at age 84.

== Personal life ==
Vogt was married and had two sons.

== Aircraft designed ==
These types were all built and flown.

In Japan

- Kawasaki KDA-2 Army Type 88 biplane reconnaissance (1927, 710 were built)
- Kawasaki KDC-2 Four passenger version of Type 88, designed with Hisashi Tojo.(1928, 2 built).
- Kawasaki KDA-3 Single-seat fighter (1928, 3 were built)
- Kawasaki KDA-5 Army Type 92 biplane fighter (1930, 385 were built)

In Germany

- Hamburger Flugzeugbau Ha 136 Advanced monoplane trainer (1934, two were built)
- Hamburger Flugzeugbau Ha 137 Close-support aircraft/dive bomber (1935, six were built)
- Blohm & Voss BV 138 Maritime reconnaissance flying boat (1937, 279 were built)
- Blohm & Voss Ha 139 Transport / reconnaissance seaplane (1936)
- Blohm & Voss Ha 140 Torpedo bomber seaplane (1937, four were built)
- Blohm & Voss BV 141 Reconnaissance aircraft (1938, 38 were built)
- Blohm & Voss BV 142 Landplane version of the BV 139 transport
- Blohm & Voss BV 143 Prototype rocket-assisted glide bomb
- Blohm & Voss BV 144 Tilt-wing transport, built in France
- Blohm & Voss BV 155 High-altitude interceptor (1944, three were built)
- Blohm & Voss BV 222 Transport / reconnaissance flying boat Viking (1940, 13 were built)
- Blohm & Voss BV 238 Reconnaissance flying boat (1944, one was built)
- Blohm & Voss BV 246 Radio-guidable glide bomb (1945, approximately 1,100 were built)
- Blohm & Voss BV 40 Interceptor glider

== Writings ==
- Vogt, Richard (1976). Weltumspannende Memoiren eines Flugzeugkonstrukteurs [Global memoirs of an aircraft designer] (in German). ISBN 978-3-934596-14-6.
