= Blohm & Voss P 215 =

WWII German jet night fighter project

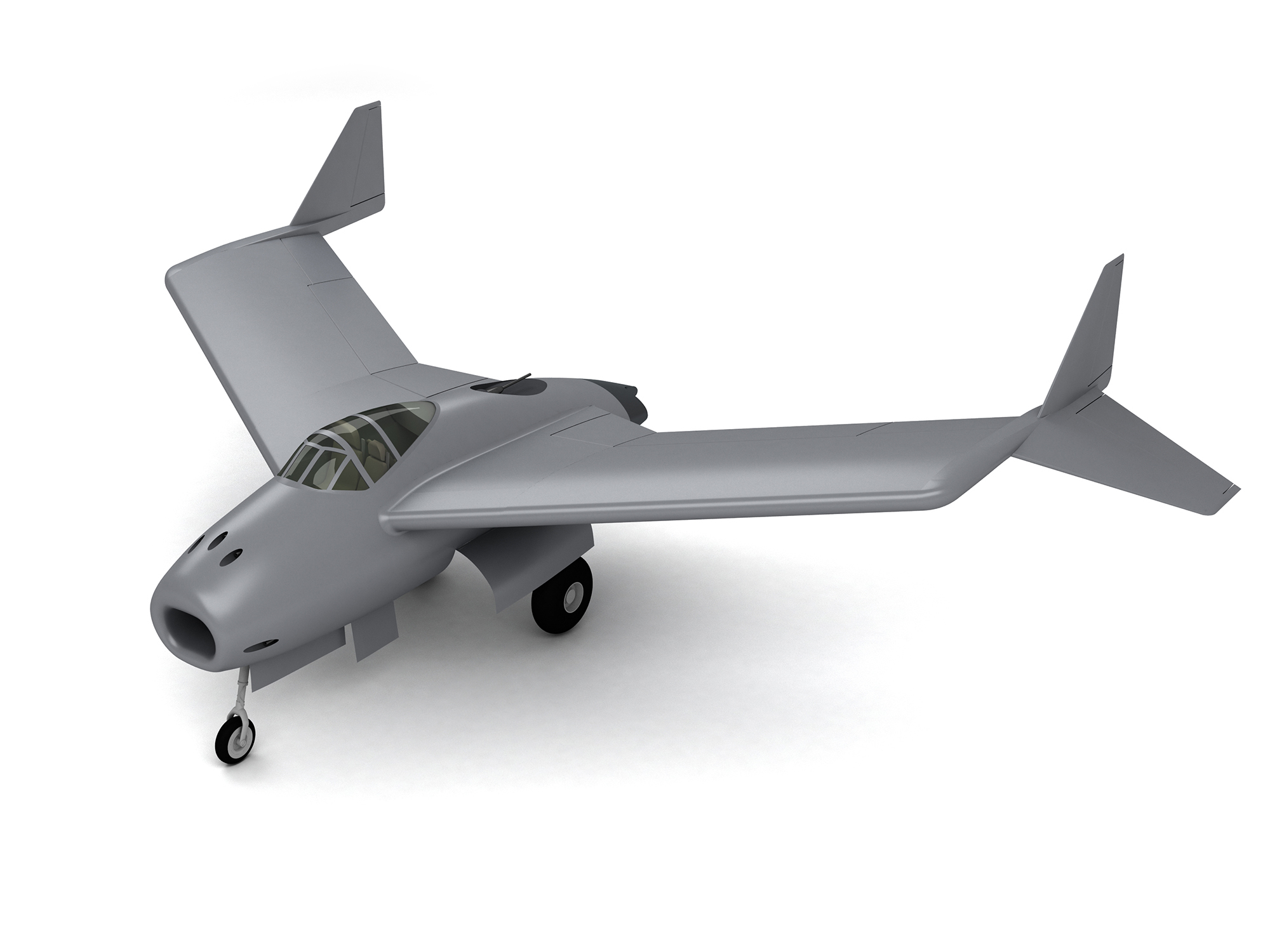

General information
- Type: Night fighter
- Manufacturer: Blohm & Voss
- Designer: Richard Vogt
- Status: Terminated by end of war
- Primary user: Luftwaffe
- Number built: None completed

History
- Developed from: Blohm & Voss P 212

The Blohm & Voss P215 was an advanced jet night fighter project by Blohm & Voss during the Second World War. With a crew of three and twin jet engines, it featured a tailless swept-wing layout and heavy armament. An order for three prototypes was received just weeks before the war ended.

== History ==
During 1944-45, under its chief designer Richard Vogt, Blohm & Voss evolved a tailless wing layout through a series of studies. The Škoda-Kauba SK SL6 was the straight-winged SK V6 modified with twin tailbooms on the wing tips, each with a separate fin and outboard horizontal stabilizer. It was built to verify the control characteristics of the configuration. The first B&V project to feature the outboard tail was the P 208, a single-engined fighter with pusher propeller, swept wings allowing much shortened tail booms and with downturned outer stabilizers in place of tail fins. The next study, the P 209.01, used the same wings and was jet powered. The P 212 saw further evolution of the design through three iterations, with the wing being more steeply swept, the tailbooms eventually eliminated altogether and small fins with rudders placed at the junction of wing and stabilizer.

In January 1945 a requirement for a night fighter with crew of three was issued. B&V developed a twinjet variant of what had to date been a single-engined single-seater. The resulting P 215 design was heavily armed and would have been a formidable opponent. An order for three prototypes was awarded on 17 March 1945, but the war ended just a few weeks later, before any significant detail design work could be begun.

== Design ==
The P 215 featured a main wing of constant chord and moderate sweep, with small landing flaps forming rear root fillets. Stub tailbooms at the wing tips supported tapered outboard tail surfaces. The horizontal stabilisers and attached elevators were angled downwards both in incidence and, more sharply, in anhedral. The neutral or negative angle of incidence provided longitudinal stability and, in conjunction with the anhedral, contributed to directional stability. Small vertical fins added to the directional stability and supported rudders. The thin, high-speed wing was unsuited to Vogt's trademark single tubular main spar, which in these designs was replaced by a broad wing box which shared the tubular construction's use of steel and doubling-up as fuel tankage.

The short fuselage carried twin Heinkel HeS 011 jet engines set low to the rear, with the large cockpit located at the front of the main wing junction. The pilot and navigator sat side by side, with the radio/radar operator immediately behind them and facing rearward. A single engine air intake at the nose fed a steel duct which formed the structural spine of the craft. It passed beneath the cockpit and between the main undercarriage wells, before running under the main wing box and dividing to feed the two engines. This structural system allowed large removable panels to be cut in the duralumin skinning, allowing easy maintenance. A single nosewheel retracted beneath the front of the duct.

Several armament options were proposed, with the main armament clustered around the nose intake and comprising a mix of heavy 30 mm or cannon with or without rockets. An unusual feature was a further pair of 30 mm cannon set either side of the rear fuselage and pivoting more than 90° to fire either rearwards or upwards. Provision was also made behind the cockpit for a single rearward-facing 20 mm gun with up to 50° elevation, and for two 500 kg bombs beneath the fuselage.

Avionics included a comprehensive all-weather radio navigation suite and the advanced FuG 244 target acquisition and gun-laying radar.

The first iteration of the design, the P 215.01, formed the basis of the brochure which accompanied the proposal. Following an initial assessment of competing designs, a revised specification was issued, with greater focus on a three-man crew, better armament and greater endurance. The revised P215.02 was therefore significantly larger and incorporated a number of refinements, including a higher aspect ratio and revised cockpit canopy.

== Specifications (P 215.02) ==
Data from Chronik Eines Flugzeugwerkes 1932-1945

General characteristics

- Crew: 3, pilot, navigator, radar/radio operator
- Length: 11.6 m (38 ft 1 in)
- Wingspan: 18.8 m (61 ft 8 in)
- Wing area: 55.0 m^{2} (592 sq ft)
- Empty weight: 7,400 kg (16,314 lb)
- Gross weight: 14,800 kg (32,628 lb)
- Powerplant: 2 × Heinkel HeS 011 turbojet engine, 12.75 kN (2,870 lbf) thrust each

Performance

- Maximum speed: 860 km/h (530 mph, 460 kn) at 6,000 m
- Range: 2,200 km (1,400 mi, 1,200 nmi)
- Service ceiling: 11,000 m (36,000 ft)
- Wing loading: 270 kg/m^{2} (55 lb/sq ft)
- Thrust/weight: 0.175

Armament

- Nose: 5 × 30 mm MK 108 cannon or 2 x 50 mm MK 112 cannon or 56 x R4M rockets,
- Rear fuselage: 2 × 30 mm MK 108 cannon plus provision for a single central rearward-firing 20 mm FHL-151 gun,
- Under fuselage: provision for 2 x 500 kilograms (1,100 lb) bombs.

Avionics
All-weather radio navigation aids, FuG 244 radar.

== See also ==
Aircraft of comparable role, configuration, and era

- Arado I
- Arado II
- Focke-Wulf II
- Focke-Wulf III
- Dornier P.256
- Gotha P-60C
- Heinkel P.1079

Related lists

- List of German aircraft projects, 1939–45
- List of World War II military aircraft of Germany
- List of World War II jet aircraft
