= Heinkel P.1080 =

German fighter project

General information
- Type: Ramjet fighter
- National origin: Germany
- Manufacturer: Heinkel
- Status: Abandoned
- Number built: 0

History
- Developed from: Heinkel P.1078

The Heinkel P.1080 was a German Emergency Fighter proposed by Heinkel.

== Design and development ==
Work on the P.1080 began in early 1945 when the Ministry of Aviation issued specifications for a fighter powered by two ramjets. The specifications called for two DFS ramjet engines, each with 3,440 pounds (1,560 kg) of thrust. The aircraft would have been tailless, with the elevators built in to the swept wing, which was based on that of the Heinkel P.1078, and would have had a single vertical stabilizer. The cockpit was located far forward in the fuselage, and the two engines were mounted at the wing roots. The nose would have housed a radar and two 30 mm MK 108 cannon. For takeoff, the aircraft would have been fitted with solid-fuel RATO boosters and jettisonable undercarriage. Landing would have been accomplished with a retractable skid. No prototypes were built.

== Specifications (Heinkel P.1080, as designed) ==
Data from

General characteristics

- Crew: 1
- Length: 8.2 m (26 ft 10 in)
- Wingspan: 8.9 m (29 ft 4 in)
- Wing area: 20 m^{2} (215.2 sq ft)
- Powerplant: 2 × DFS ramjet engine, 15.3 kN (3,440 lbf) thrust each
- Powerplant: 4 × Solid-Fuel RATO Boosters, 9.8 kN (2,205 lbf) thrust each

Performance

- Maximum speed: 1,000 km/h (621 mph, 540 kn)

Armament

- Guns: 2x MK 108 autocannon

== See also ==
Related development

- Heinkel P.1078

Aircraft of comparable role, configuration, and era

- EFW N-20
- Gloster Javelin
- Northrop X-4 Bantam
