= Messerschmitt P.1112 =

German fighter project

Me P.1112
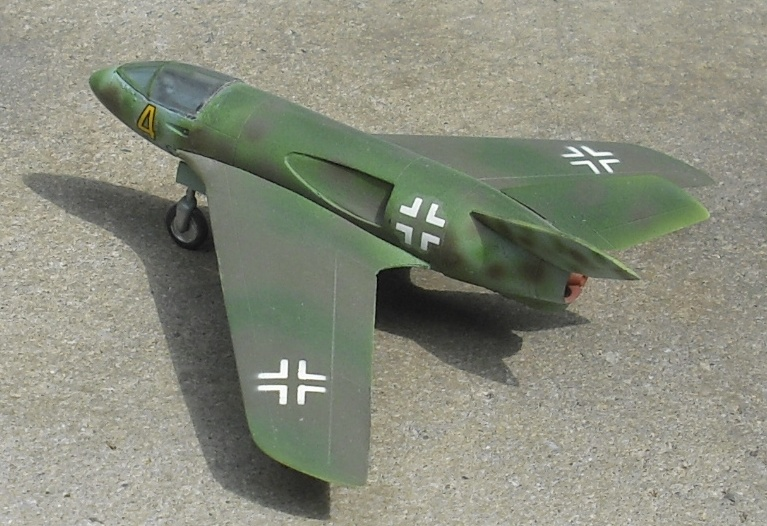
- Model of one Me P.1112/V1 design concept

General information
- Type: Jet fighter
- National origin: Nazi Germany
- Manufacturer: Messerschmitt
- Primary user: Luftwaffe
- Number built: 0

History
- Developed from: Messerschmitt P.1110 and Messerschmitt P.1111

The Messerschmitt P.1112 was a proposed German jet fighter, developed by Messerschmitt AG during the closing stages of World War II, and intended for use by the Luftwaffe. The progress of the war prevented the completion of a prototype before the fall of Nazi Germany. Its design, however, had a direct influence on postwar US Navy carrier fighters.

== Design and development ==
The work on the Me P.1112 started on 25 February 1945 after Willy Messerschmitt decided to halt the development of the Messerschmitt P.1111, which would have required, as standard equipment, a pressurized cockpit and ejection seat. Designed by the head of the Messerschmitt Project Office Woldemar Voigt (1907–1980), between 3 and 30 March 1945 as an alternative to the Me P.1111, the Me P.1112 design was less radical than the P.1111 and incorporated the lessons learned from the development of the Messerschmitt P.1110 design. Voigt estimated that the Me P.1112 would commence flight testing by mid-1946.

Intended to be powered by a single Heinkel HeS 011 turbojet, three design concepts of the Me P.1112 were developed. The last proposed design was the Me P.1112/V1 using a V-tail design and fuselage lateral intakes; the two first were the Me P.1112 S/1, with wing root air intakes, and the Me P.1112 S/2, with fuselage lateral intakes, both with a larger, single fin; both designs lacked conventional horizontal stabilizers. All three had a fuselage maximum diameter of 1.1 metres (3.6 ft). The aircraft's wing design was similar in appearance to that of Messerschmitt's Me 163 Komet rocket fighter. The pilot was seated in a semi-reclined position, and was equipped with an ejection seat.

A partial mockup of the Me P.1112 V/1, consisting of the aircraft's forward fuselage section, was constructed in the "Conrad von Hötzendorf" Kaserne at Oberammergau, but the Messerschmitt facilities there were occupied by American troops in April 1945, before construction of the prototype could begin.

Mockup of the Messerschmitt Me P.1112/V1 found by the US Army in April 1945.
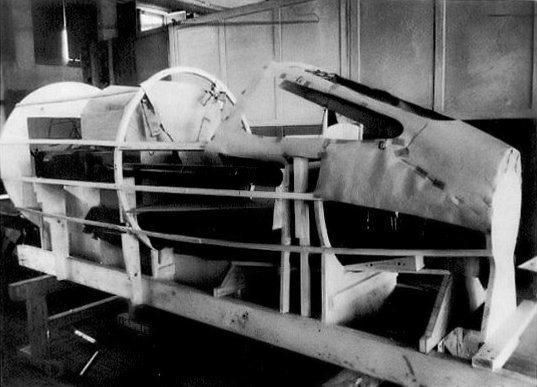
Fuselage

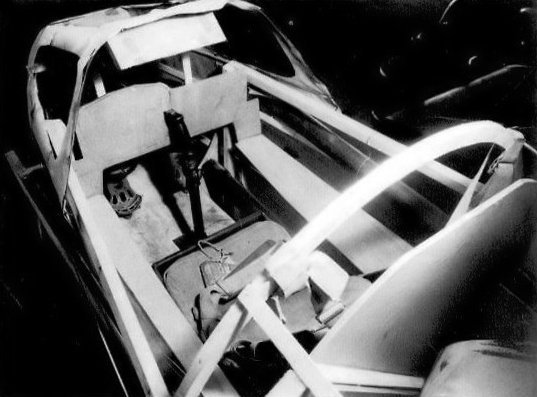
Cockpit

Although the Me P.1112 was never completed, follow-on designs were already proposed, even as design work on the type itself was done. These included a proposed night fighter version, which was intended to be fitted with twin engines mounted in the wing roots of the aircraft.

Following the war, Voigt's experience in tailless aircraft design was put to use by the Chance Vought company in the United States, where he was involved in the design of the F7U Cutlass fighter.

== Specifications ==
Data from Schick, Herwig, LePage.

General characteristics

- Crew: one (pilot)
- Length: 8.25 m (27 ft 1 in) Version P 1112 S/1 of 27 March 1945 (Note: The P 1112/V1 design of 30 March 1945 had an overall length of 9.24 m (30 ft 4 in) and a span of 8.16 m (26 ft 9 in).)
- Wingspan: 8.74 m (28 ft 8 in) Version P 1112 S/1 of 27 March 1945
- Height: 2.84 m (9 ft 4 in)
- Wing area: 19 m^{2} (200 sq ft)
- Aspect ratio: 3.5 : 1
- Empty weight: 2,290 kg (5,049 lb)
- Gross weight: 4,673 kg (10,302 lb)
- Fuel capacity: 1,900 L (500 US gal) with provision for increasing fuel capacity to 2,400 L (630 US gal)
- Powerplant: 1 × Heinkel HeS 011A0 turbojet, 12.7 kN (2,855 lbf) thrust 1300 kPa (Note: to be replaced later by a HeS 011B0 rated at 1,500 kP (3,306 lb) thrust)

Performance

- Maximum speed: 1,100 km/h (680 mph, 590 kn)
- Endurance: estimated at more than two hours at 7,000 m (23,000 ft) at 100% thrust
- Service ceiling: 14,000 m (46,000 ft)
- Wing loading: 246 kg/m^{2} (50 lb/sq ft) maximum
- Thrust/weight: 0.277 with HeS 011A

Armament

- Standard armament (proposed): 4 x 30 mm (1.2 in) MK 108 cannon or 2x 30mm MK 108 cannon and 2x 30 mm (1.2 in) MK 103 cannon
- Special armament for anti-bomber role (proposed): 1 x 50 mm (2.0 in) MK 214A cannon (upper forward fuselage) for anti-bomber role (Note: The long-barreled Mauser MK214 50mm cannon was developed in an effort to create the ultimate bomber-killers, capable of attacking from a long distance, protected from the defensive fire of the bombers. A MK 214 mounted on a Me 262 was used only time against American bombers on 16 April 1945 by the special fighter unit Jagdverband 44 (Forsyth 2008, p. 62; Jenkins 1996, p. 48). The MK 214 was planned to be mounted asymmetrically on the P1112 front, necessitating an asymmetric seating (Griehl 1988, p. 86).) or 1x 55 mm (2.2 in) MK 112 cannon (lower forward fuselage)
- Maximum weapon load: 500 kilograms (1,100 lb)

== See also ==
Related development

- Messerschmitt P.1101
- Messerschmitt P.1110
- Messerschmitt P.1111

Related lists

- List of World War II military aircraft of Germany
