= Junkers EF 128 =

Proposed German jet fighter aircraft

Ju EF 128
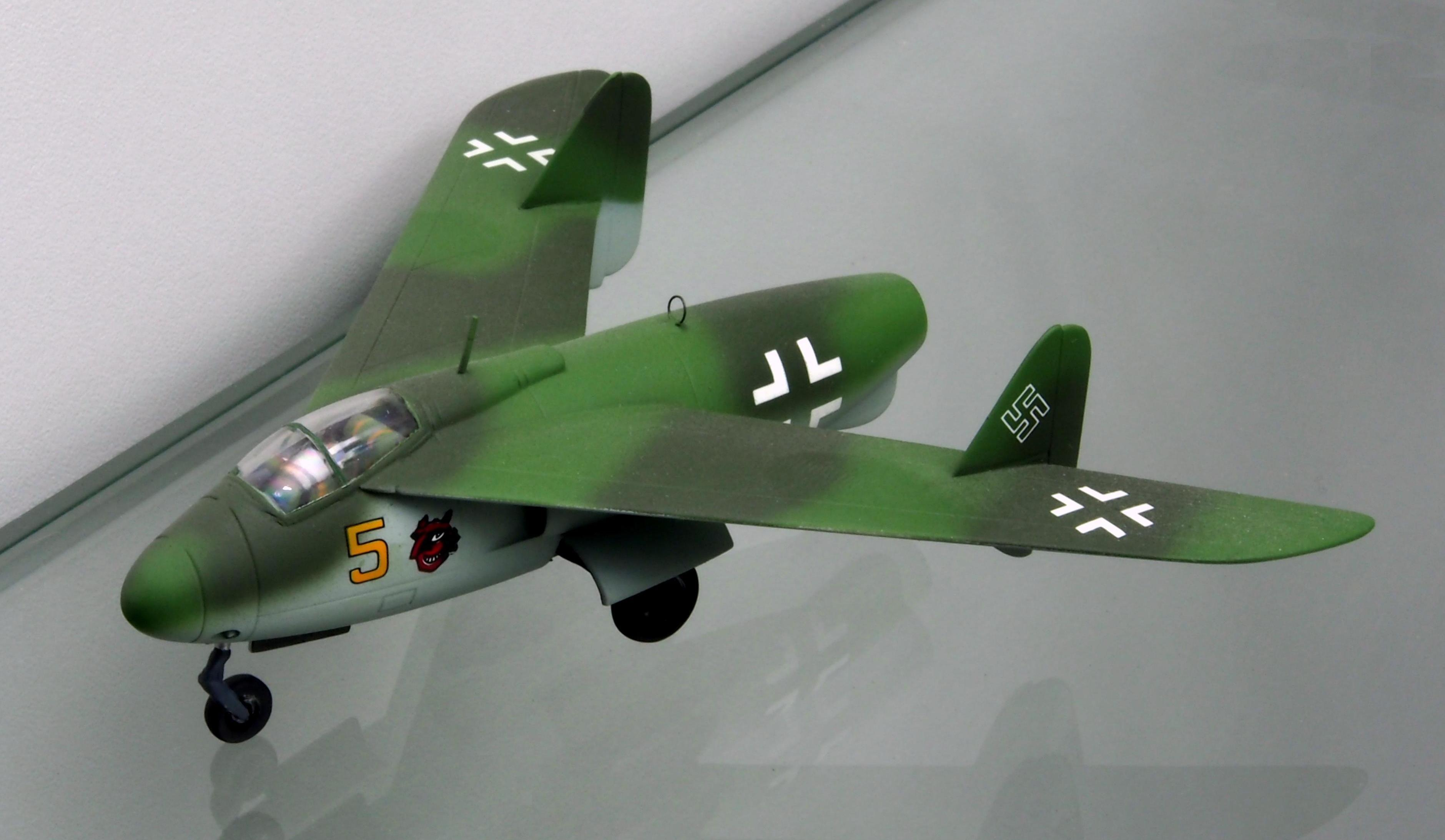
- Junkers EF 128 model at the Technikmuseum Speyer

General information
- Type: Interceptor
- Manufacturer: Junkers
- Status: Terminated by end of war
- Primary user: Luftwaffe
- Number built: One wind-tunnel prototype and a mock-up fuselage

The Junkers EF 128 was a project for a single-engine jet fighter, developed for the Emergency Fighter Program Luftwaffe design competition during the Second World War.

The EF 128 was a tailless swept-wing design and was to have been powered by a Heinkel HeS 011 turbojet and armed with four MK 108 cannons, reaching a speed of 1000 km/h at an altitude of 7000 m.

A development contract was received in March 1945 but no progress could be made before the war ended.

== History ==
As part of the Emergency Fighter Program (German: Jägernotprogramm), at the beginning of 1945 a programme was launched by the OKL to replace the He 162 "Volksjäger" (people's fighter). The new aircraft was intended to have superior performance in order to deal with high altitude threats such as the B-29 Superfortress. To meet this requirement, power was to be a single Heinkel HeS 011 turbojet.

Junkers submitted their initial proposal in December 1944. Designated the EF 128, it was of tailless configuration, with a high-mounted swept wing and twin fins set approximately mid-span on each wing. Side intakes for the engine were located underneath the wing and almost flush with the fuselage. Construction was to be of mixed wood and metal, using non-strategic materials wherever possible. By January design refinements included boundary layer suction, to help alleviate fears of transonic stagnation around the unusually positioned engine intakes.

The final design was submitted in February 1945. Competing designs put forward at this time by other German aircraft makers were the Messerschmitt P.1110, Heinkel P.1078, Focke-Wulf Ta 183 and Blohm & Voss P 212. In March 1945 it was decided that the EF 128 and the more conventional Focke-Wulf Ta 183 should go into production as urgent interim solutions to the single-engine jet fighter requirement. Shortly afterwards a development contract was placed with Junkers, however the Junkers factory was overrun by Allied troops only a month later. At some stage a wind tunnel model of the final design was tested.

== See also ==
Aircraft of comparable role, configuration, and era

- Blohm & Voss P.212

Related Lists

- List of German aircraft projects, 1939–45
