= Messerschmitt P.1111 =

German fighter project

Me P.1111
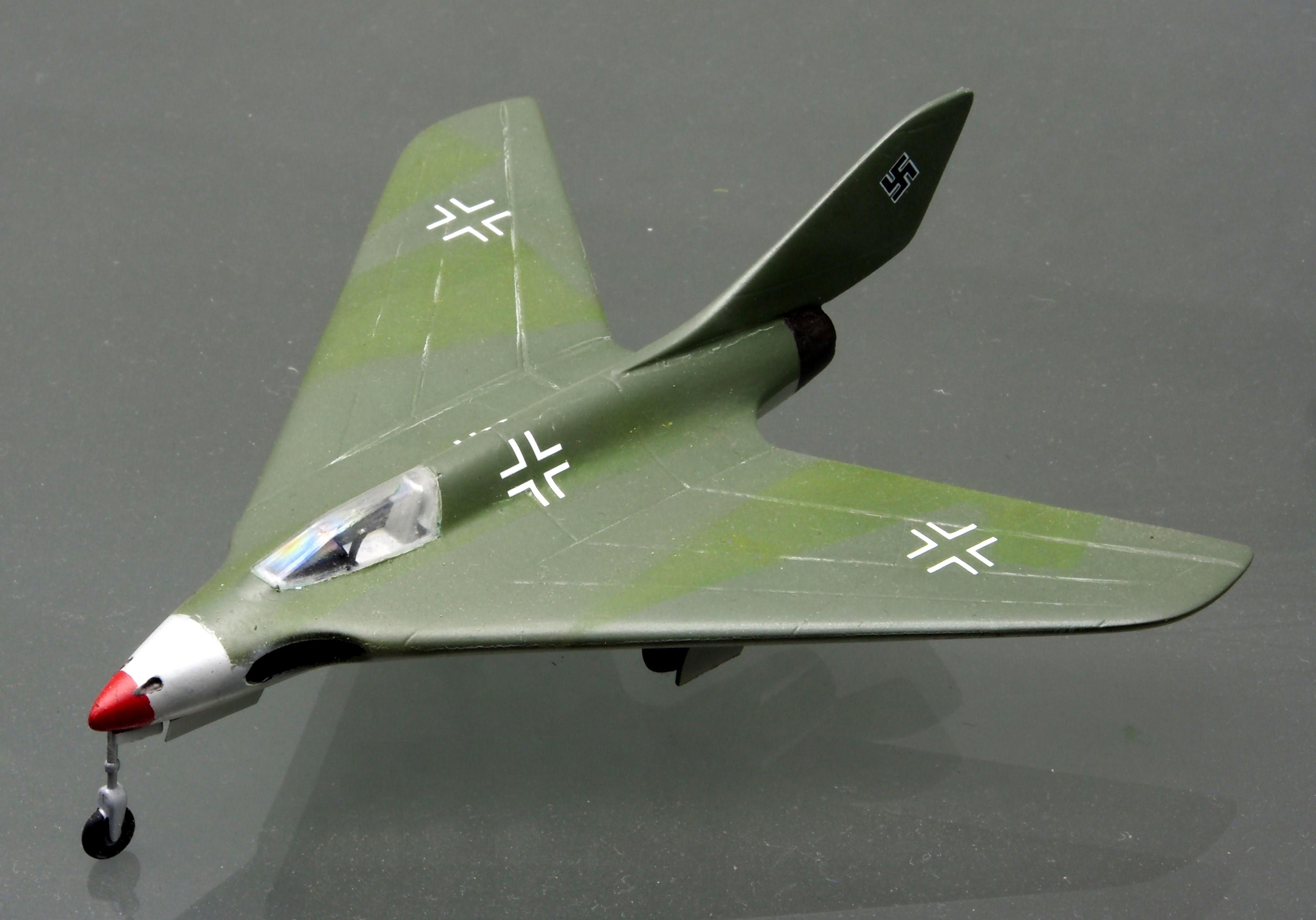
- Me P.1111 model at the Technik Museum Speyer

General information
- Type: Fighter
- Manufacturer: Messerschmitt
- Status: Project terminated
- Primary user: Luftwaffe
- Number built: None

History
- Developed from: Me P.1110 Ente

The Messerschmitt P.1111 was a jet fighter/interceptor project, designed by Messerschmitt for the Luftwaffe near the end of World War II.

== History ==
The innovative design of the Me P.1111 was completed in January 1945, and was intended as an improvement to the Messerschmitt P.1110 Ente.

The Messerschmitt P.1111 was an 8.92 m-long tailless airplane with nearly delta-shaped wings, swept back at a 45-degree angle, and a wingspan of 9.12 m. It was equipped with a pressurized cockpit for a single pilot. The planned powerplant was a Heinkel HeS 011 turbojet engine, and armament was to be four 30 mm MK 108 cannon.

During a design review comparison conference in Oberammergau on February 27 and 28, 1945, the P. 1111 fared outstanding in the area of performance in high-speed flight capability, take-off, climb and landing performance. The experts held the opinion that these qualities demonstrated a fundamental superiority of the flying wing construction type. However, the P.1111 was ruled out due to the impossibility of protecting the fuel.

Only one wooden model was built. The project was later further developed into the Me P.1112.

== Specifications ==
General characteristics

- Crew: 1
- Length: 8.92 m (29 ft 3 in)
- Wingspan: 9.16 m (30 ft 1 in)
- Wing area: 28.0 m^{2} (301 sq ft)
- Empty weight: 2,740 kg (6,041 lb)
- Gross weight: 4,282 kg (9,440 lb)
- Fuel capacity: 1,250 kg (2,756 lb)
- Powerplant: 1 × Heinkel HeS 011A turbojet engine, 12.74 kN (2,865 lbf) thrust

Performance

- Maximum speed: 900 km/h (560 mph, 490 kn) at sea level

995 km/h (618 mph; 537 kn) at 7,000 m (23,000 ft)

- Landing speed: 155 km/h (96 mph; 84 kn)
- Landing run: 450 m (1,480 ft)
- Stall speed: 155 km/h (96 mph, 84 kn) 1/3 fuel full ammunition
- Range: 1,500 km (930 mi, 810 nmi)
- Service ceiling: 14,000 m (46,000 ft) and higher
- Rate of climb: 23.7 m/s (4,670 ft/min) at sea level
- Take-off run: 600 m (2,000 ft)

Armament

- Guns: 4 × 30mm MK 108 cannon (two in nose, and two more in wings)

== See also ==
- List of German aircraft projects, 1939–45
