= Emergency Fighter Program =

German fighter-aircraft design competition during WWII

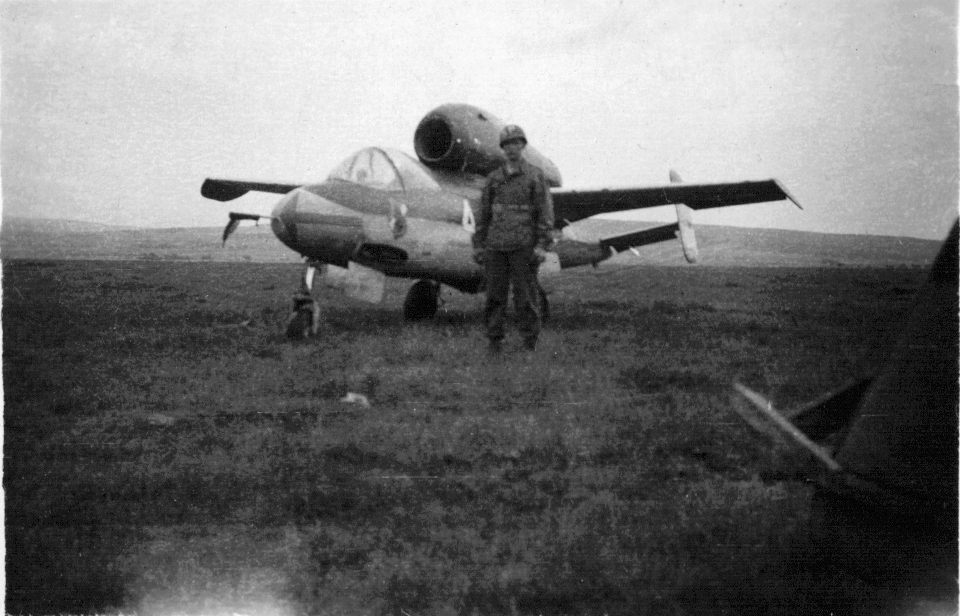
American soldier guarding a captured Heinkel He 162 Spatz.

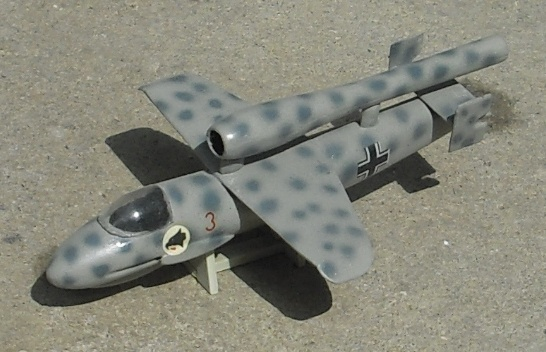
Model of pulsejet-powered He P.1077 Romeo. Pulsejets vibrated excessively and needed help to start.

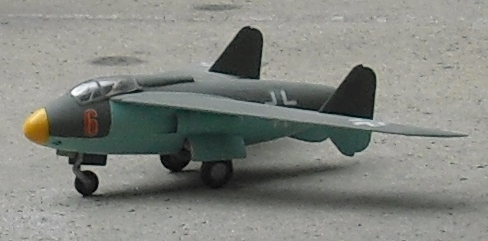
Model of Junkers EF 128, one of the last jet-powered projects before the fall of the Reich

The Emergency Fighter Program (German: Jägernotprogramm) was the program that resulted from a decision taken on July 3, 1944, by the Luftwaffe regarding the German aircraft manufacturing companies during the last year of Nazi Germany.

This project was one of the products of the latter part of 1944, when the Luftwaffe High Command saw that there was a dire need for a strong defense against Allied bombing raids. Although opposed by important figures such as Luftwaffe fighter force leader Adolf Galland, the project went ahead owing to the backing of Reichsmarschall Hermann Göring. Most of the designs of the Emergency Fighter Program never proceeded past the project stage.

== History ==
1944 began with massive bombing raids by the US Army Air Force and RAF Bomber Command on a unprecedented scale. With a shift of emphasis from targeting strategic targets to the destruction of the Luftwaffe, during the Big Week in late February 1944 the Luftwaffe fighter force was broken. By the summer, Allied aircraft were roaming at will over most of Germany.

The jet-powered Messerschmitt Me 262, then about to enter service, had a clear performance advantage over the Allied aircraft but was expensive and difficult to keep operational. This led to the idea to design much simpler aircraft which could be easily built and so inexpensive that any extensive problems would be addressed by simply disposing of the aircraft. This became the genesis of the Emergency Fighter Program as part of shifting production to defensive interceptors. A number of new aircraft design competition programmes were launched to provide new designs.

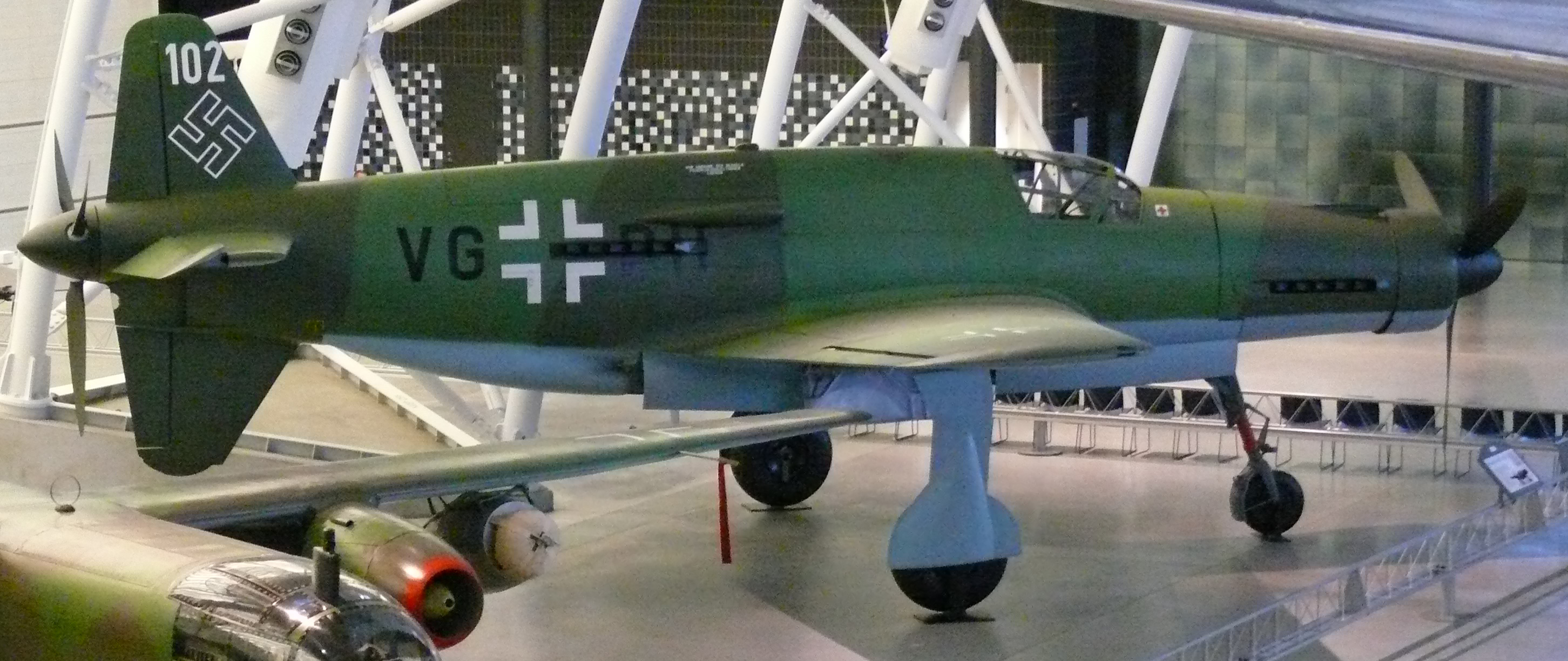
The Do 335 was the only piston-engined fighter allowed to go forward under the Jägernotprogramm.

Production of the Messerschmitt Me 262 fighter versions continued, as did the development of advanced piston-engined fighters such as the Dornier Do 335 as per Hitler's personal request on May 23, 1944, before the July 3 announcement of the program. Bomber designs powered by piston engines were curtailed or canceled, with only jet bombers such as the Arado Ar 234 allowed to continue in production. New jet bombers such as the Junkers Ju 287 and Heinkel He 343 were worked on fitfully as low priority projects in the last months of the war.

Towards the end of the war the design of aircraft largely ignored the safety or comfort of the pilots, who would be mostly Hitler Youth motivated by fanaticism. Some of the fighters, such as the Heinkel P.1077 Julia, the Blohm & Voss BV 40 and the Arado E.381 Kleinstjäger – "smallest fighter" were designed with the pilot flying the aircraft in a prone position. Powered by rockets, certain designs were a blend of "aircraft and projectile" in the words of Nazi propaganda, with a vertical takeoff like a missile launch system attempted for the first time in a crewed aircraft, such as the Bachem Ba 349 Natter —in which the test-pilot died in the first flight.

=== Peoples' Fighter ===
In September 1944, the Volksjäger ("Peoples' Fighter") design competition was initiated to create a lightweight high-speed fighter/interceptor using a single BMW 003 turbojet engine, and intended for rapid mass-production while using minimal resources. The Volksjäger was intended to be disposable, with damaged aircraft being discarded rather than repaired, and was to be flown by pilots hastily trained on gliders.

After a hurried design competition involving almost all German aircraft companies Heinkel's He 162 was selected over the Blohm & Voss P 211 and rival designs from Focke-Wulf, Fieseler, and Junkers.. The first prototype flew in December 1944.

=== Miniature Fighter ===
In November 1944 Blohm und Voss designed the BV P 213 Miniaturjäger ("Miniature Fighter") with the aim of producing a very small interceptor using the absolute minimum of strategic materials. It was to be powered by a single Argus As 014 pulsejet engine, since building this engine required far fewer man-hours than the 375 man-hours needed to build a Junkers Jumo 004 turbojet. However, the P 213’s pulsejet didn't produce enough power at low speeds for takeoff and was unsuitable for crewed aircraft which would have to take off unassisted. Since additional launch schemes would have to be added to the project, such as towplanes, catapults or rocket boosters, the goal of the P 213 would be defeated as complexity and expense would be far higher. Thus the Miniaturjäger project never saw the light of day, being abandoned by December 1944.

=== 1-TL-Jäger program ===
In 1943, a requirement was launched by the OKL for a single-seat jet fighter to replace the Me 262. The new aircraft was intended to have superior performance in order to deal with future high altitude threats such as the B-29 Superfortress. To meet this requirement, power was to be a single Heinkel HeS 011 turbojet, of which only 19 examples were ever produced, and all used for testing. The designs of the Messerschmitt P.1110, Heinkel P.1078, Focke-Wulf Ta 183, Blohm & Voss P 212 as well as the official winner of the competition, the Junkers EF 128, were submitted by February 1945.

Only the Messerschmitt prototype of this more advanced fighter had been started by the end of the war. The first prototype of the Messerschmitt P.1101 was 80% complete when captured at the end of the war, following which it was taken to America, with some of its design ideas used as the basis of the Bell X-5 variable geometry research aircraft.

== List of projects ==
=== Pulsejet ===
- Arado Ar E.381 Kleinstjäger
- Blohm & Voss P 213
- Heinkel He 162 B
- Heinkel P.1077 Romeo
- Junkers EF 126
- Messerschmitt Me 328
- Zeppelin pulsejet fighter

=== Ramjet ===
- Focke-Wulf Super Lorin
- Focke-Wulf Ta 283
- Gotha Rammer Rammstachel
- Lippisch Li P.13b
- Škoda-Kauba P14

=== Rocket ===
- Arado Ar E.381 Kleinstjäger
- Bachem Ba 349 Natter
- Heinkel He 176
- Heinkel P.1077
- Lippisch Rammer

=== Turbojet ===
- Arado E.580 Volksjäger
- Arado E.581
- Blohm & Voss Ae 607
- Blohm & Voss P 211
- Blohm & Voss P 212
- Focke-Wulf Ta 183 Huckebein
- Focke-Wulf Volksjäger 1
- Junkers EF 128
- Lippisch Li P.11
- Lippisch Li P.15
- Heinkel He 162
- Heinkel P.1078
- Heinkel P.1079
- Messerschmitt P.1101
- Messerschmitt P.1110
- Messerschmitt P.1106
- Sombold So 344 Schußjäger

== See also ==
- Emergency fighter
- List of German aircraft projects, 1939–45

== Bibliography ==
- Smith, J.R. and Kay, Antony L. German Aircraft of the Second World War. London: Putnam, 1972. ISBN 0-85177-836-4.
