= Messerschmitt P.1110 =

German high-altitude interceptor project

Me P.1110
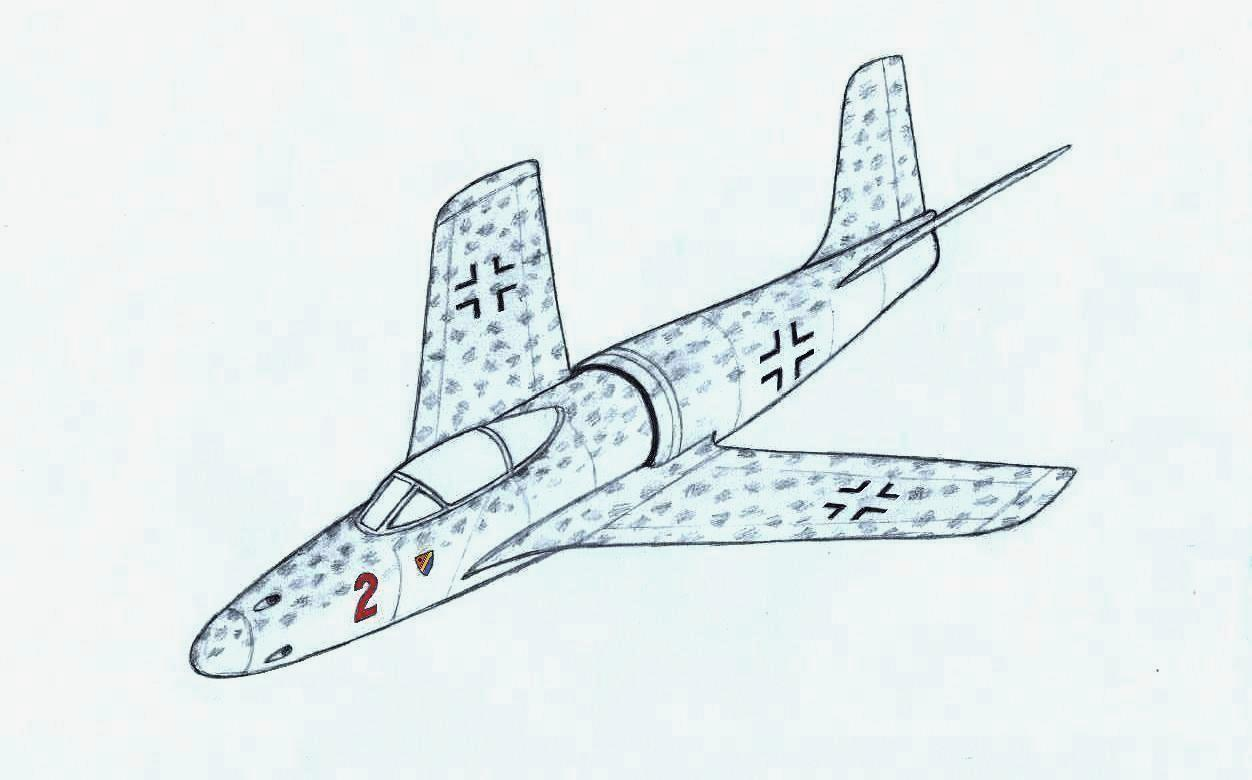
- Messerschmitt P.1110/I

General information
- Type: High-altitude interceptor
- Manufacturer: Messerschmitt
- Status: Never went beyond proposal
- Primary user: Luftwaffe

History
- Developed from: Messerschmitt P.1101
- Developed into: Messerschmitt P.1111

The Messerschmitt P.1110 (Me P.1110) was a design for a single-seat, high-altitude interceptor, prepared for the German Luftwaffe by the Messerschmitt aircraft manufacturing company, under the Emergency Fighter Program during the last months of World War II.

== History ==
As part of the Emergency Fighter Program (German: Jägernotprogramm), at the beginning of 1945, a programme was launched by the Oberkommando der Luftwaffe (OKL) for a new generation of fighter/interceptor aircraft in order to replace the He 162 Volksjäger. The new aircraft was intended to have superior performance, in order to deal with high-altitude threats such as the B-29 Superfortress.

Messerschmitt designed a number of different high-altitude fighter projects which were submitted in February 1945. One of the designs, the Me P.1110 Ente (Duck), had a 40° wing sweep and annular air intakes in front of the wing root (similar to those on the post-war North American YF-93), feeding a single Heinkel HeS 011A jet engine; the annular intakes, while flowing four percent less air, would produce fifteen percent less drag than a single nose intake. The aircraft was to be armed with three MK 108 cannon in the nose, plus perhaps two more in the 40°-swept wings. There was also a proposed butterfly tail variant. Projected maximum speed was 1,015 km/h (631 mph; 548 kn).

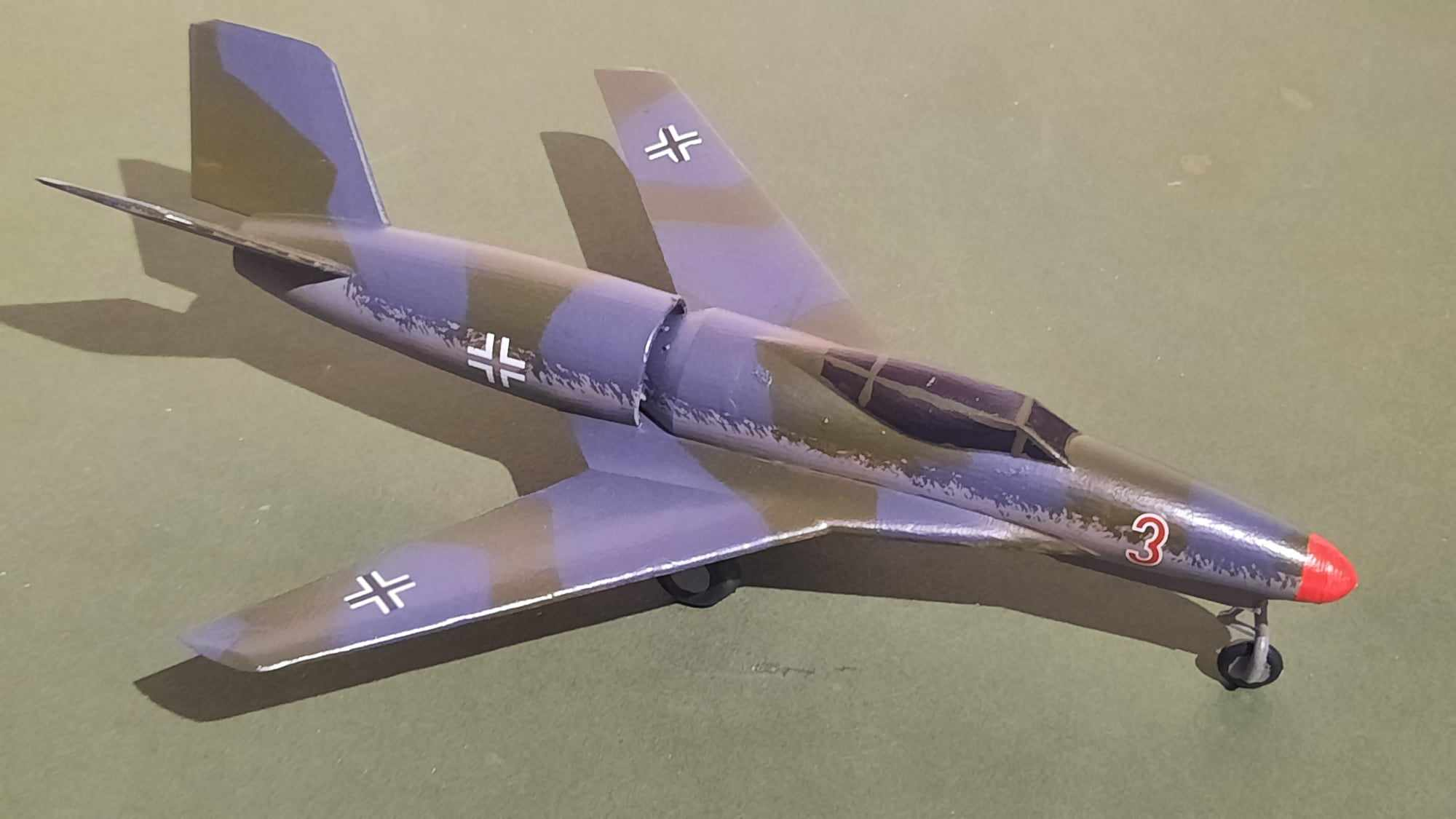
A model of a Messerschmitt P.1110 created with reference to the original drawings.

The project would be soon dropped in favor of the other two more conventional designs, but the Junkers EF 128 was chosen as the official winner of the competition and none of the Messerschmitt designs reached the prototype stage. The designs brought forward by other German aircraft makers were the Heinkel P.1078, the Focke-Wulf Ta 183 and the Blohm & Voss P 212.

A further development, the P.1111, with wing root intakes (a concept later adopted by the Republic RF-84F Thunderflash and F-105 Thunderchief) to overcome the power losses and 45° sweep, was prepared in January 1945 but never built.

== Variants ==
The Messerschmitt P.1110 project had at least three different designs, all of which were single-seat fighters with swept wings. Wings were swept back at 40 degrees and included mostly wood in their construction. All of the projected aircraft would be powered by a single Heinkel HeS 011 turbojet.

Me P.1110/I
Jet-powered interceptor. It was a conventional looking design with the turbojet air intakes located on the fuselage sides. Its armament was three MK 108 cannons located in the nose, as in the following variant.

Me P.1110/II
A V-tail jet-powered interceptor with a conventional looking design. The air intake of the engine was of an annular shape located behind the cockpit. Like the Me P.1110/I, the Me P.1110/II had 40 degree swept-back wings.

Me P.1110 Ente
The Me P.1110 "Ente" (Duck) was a more unusual interceptor project with its cockpit located at the nose end of the plane. It had a canard configuration with small wings in the front and larger wings in the rear part of the fuselage. Its air intakes were located on the fuselage sides like in the Me P.1110/I variant. Its armament was four MK 108 cannon.

== Specifications (As of 12 January 1945) ==
Data from Luftwaffe Secret Projects: Fighters 1939-1945

General characteristics

- Crew: 1
- Length: 9.67 m (31 ft 9 in)
- Wingspan: 6.65 m (21 ft 10 in)
- Height: 2.7 m (8 ft 10 in)
- Wing area: 13.17 m^{2} (141.8 sq ft)
- Empty weight: 2,580 kg (5,688 lb)
- Gross weight: 4,000 kg (8,818 lb) with 1,200 kg (2,646 lb) of fuel
- Powerplant: 1 × Heinkel HeS 011 turbojet engine, 12.74 kN (2,865 lbf) thrust

Performance

- Maximum speed: 1,000 km/h (620 mph, 540 kn) at 7,000 m (23,000 ft)
- Landing speed: 180 km/h (110 mph; 97 kn)
- Service ceiling: 13,100 m (43,000 ft)
- Rate of climb: 26 m/s (5,100 ft/min)
- Wing loading: 304 kg/m^{2} (62 lb/sq ft)
- Take-off run: 830 m (2,720 ft)

Armament

- Guns: 3 × Nose-mounted 30 mm MK 108 cannon

== Specifications (As of 22 February 1945) ==
Data from Luftwaffe Secret Projects: Fighters 1939-1945

General characteristics

- Crew: 1
- Length: 10.36 m (33 ft 11 in)
- Wingspan: 8.25 m (27 ft 1 in)
- Height: 3.18 m (10 ft 5 in)
- Wing area: 15.85 m^{2} (170.6 sq ft)
- Empty weight: 2,812 kg (6,199 lb)
- Gross weight: 4,290 kg (9,458 lb) with 1,250 kg (2,756 lb) of fuel
- Powerplant: 1 × Heinkel HeS 011 turbojet engine, 12.74 kN (2,865 lbf) thrust

Performance

- Maximum speed: 1,000 km/h (621 mph, 540 kn) at 7,000 m (23,000 ft)
- Landing speed: 178 km/h (111 mph; 96 kn)
- Service ceiling: 14,000 m (46,000 ft) (Approx.)
- Rate of climb: 21.5 m/s (4,230 ft/min)
- Wing loading: 271 kg/m^{2} (56 lb/sq ft)
- Take-off run: 790 m (2,590 ft)

Armament

- Guns: 3 × Nose-mounted 30 mm (1.2 in) MK 108 cannon, and provision for two more in the wings (Projected)

== See also ==
Related development

- Messerschmitt P.1101
- Messerschmitt P.1111

Aircraft of comparable role, configuration, and era

- 1-TL-Jäger Competition
  - Blohm & Voss P 212
  - Focke-Wulf Ta 183
  - Heinkel P.1078
  - Junkers EF 128
- Other Aircraft
  - Bell X-5
  - Saab 32

Related lists

- List of German aircraft projects, 1939–45
- List of jet aircraft of World War II
- List of World War II military aircraft of Germany
