= Blohm & Voss P 212 =

Proposed jet fighter designed by Blohm & Voss

P 212
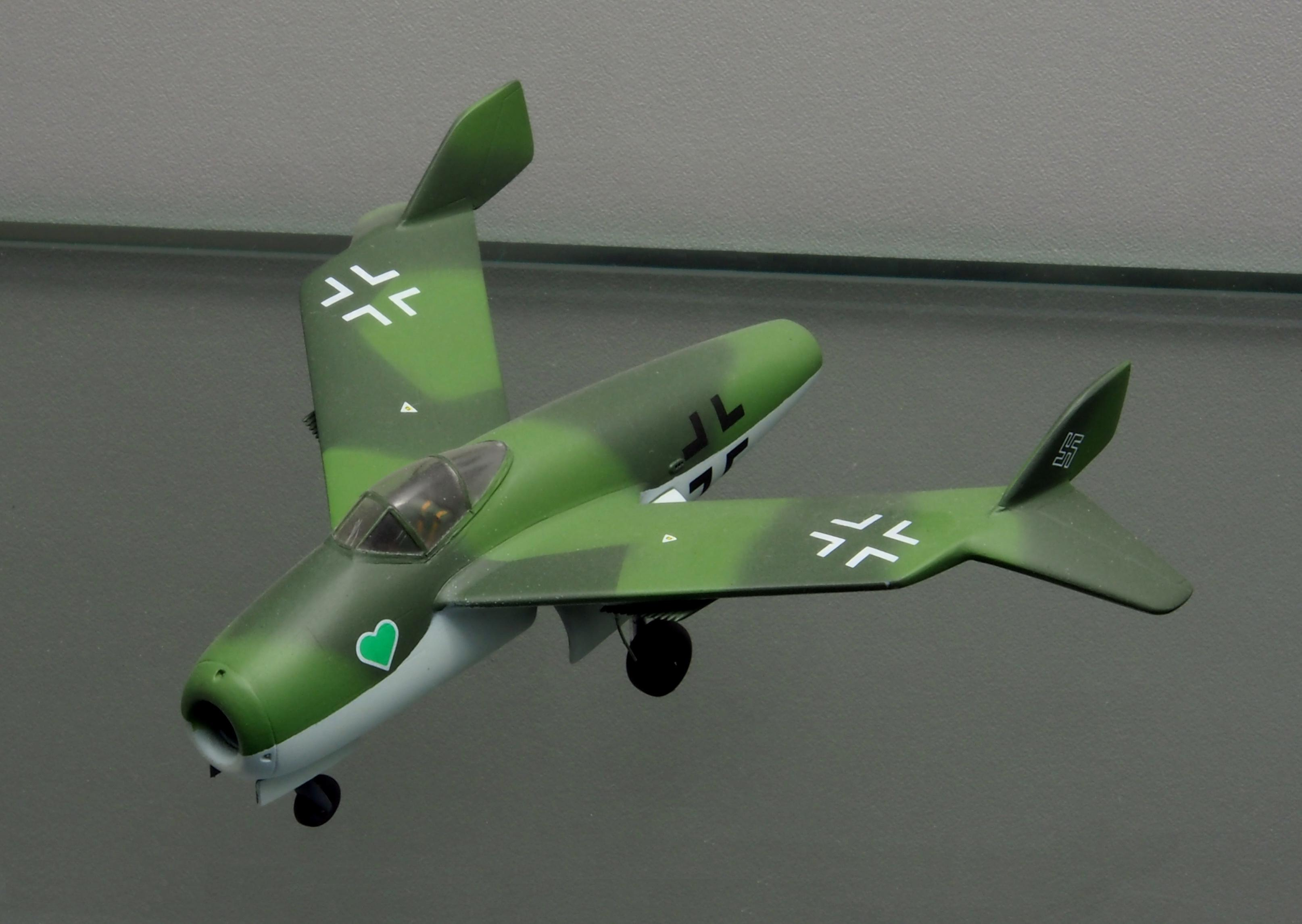
- Model of the Blohm & Voss BV P 212.03 at the Technik Museum Speyer

General information
- Type: Fighter
- Manufacturer: Blohm & Voss
- Designer: Richard Vogt
- Status: Terminated by end of war
- Primary user: Luftwaffe
- Number built: None completed

History
- Developed from: Blohm & Voss P 209

The Blohm & Voss P 212 was a proposed jet fighter designed by Blohm & Voss for the Emergency Fighter Program Luftwaffe design competition during the Second World War.

== History ==
In early 1945, a replacement was sought for the Heinkel He 162 Volksjäger under the continuing Emergency Fighter Program, challenging engineers to develop a new aircraft built around the Heinkel HeS 011, a new jet engine which was being developed, in order to create a better high-altitude fighter jet. By February 1945, the Luftwaffe had received several proposals. Three proposals had been received from Messerschmitt, two from Focke-Wulf and one each from Heinkel, Junkers and Blohm & Voss respectively. The competition was won by the Junkers EF 128, a broadly similar design.

== Design ==
Three iterations of the P 212 were studied, all featuring a similar general layout of a short fuselage with nose intake leading to a single buried Heinkel HeS 011 jet engine, and a tailless swept wing.

=== P 212.01 ===
The first of the P 212 designs had a short, squat fuselage and a short air intake for the He S 011 jet engine. Its wings were swept at a 45-degree angle.

=== P 212.02 ===
The second of the P 212 designs featured a slightly lengthened fuselage and was seen as a refined version of the original.

=== P 212.03 ===
The third version, the P 212.03, boasted a further lengthened fuselage with a pressurized cockpit and larger internal fuel tanks. Its wings were swept back at forty degrees. Uniquely, the wings were designed to be made out of either wood, steel or aluminium as available. With an ideal fuel weight, the aircraft could fly for up to four hours at a time. This was the model presented to the Luftwaffe.

== Specification (P 212.03) ==
Data from Pawlas (1974)

General characteristics

- Crew: 1
- Length: 7.185 m (23 ft 7 in)
- Wingspan: 9.5 m (31 ft 2 in)
- Wing area: 14 m^{2} (150 sq ft)
- Gross weight: 4,164 kg (9,180 lb)takeoff weight
- Powerplant: 1 × Heinkel-Hirth HeS 011 turbojet

Performance

- Maximum speed: 965 km/h (600 mph, 521 kn) at 7,000 metres (23,000 ft)
- Rate of climb: 21.3 m/s (4,190 ft/min)
- Wing loading: 310 kg/m^{2} (63 lb/sq ft)

Armament

== See also ==
Aircraft of comparable role, configuration, and era

- Focke-Wulf Ta 183
- Heinkel P.1078
- Junkers EF 128
- Messerschmitt P.1110

Related lists

- List of German aircraft projects, 1939–45
- List of jet aircraft of World War II
- List of World War II military aircraft of Germany
