= Heinkel P.1078 =

Single seat interceptor developed for the Luftwaffe

He P.1078
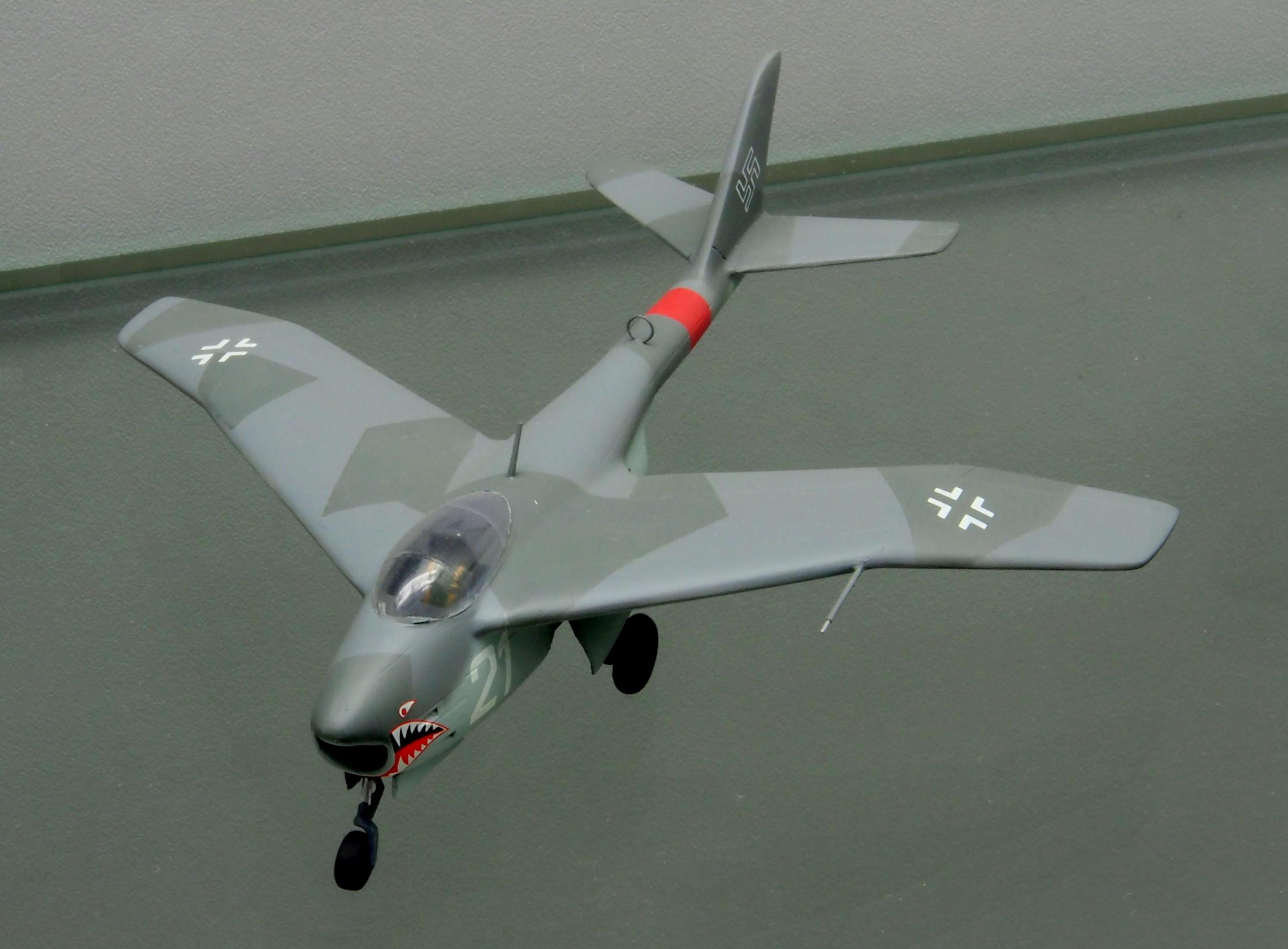
- Model of the He P.1078 A at the Technikmuseum Speyer

General information
- Type: Interceptor
- Manufacturer: Heinkel
- Status: Never went past the project stage
- Primary user: Luftwaffe

The Heinkel P.1078 (He P.1078) was a single seat interceptor developed for the Luftwaffe by Heinkel aircraft manufacturing company under the Emergency Fighter Program during the last years of the Third Reich.

== History ==
As part of the Emergency Fighter Program (German: Jägernotprogramm), at the beginning of 1945 a programme was launched by the OKL for a new generation of fighter/interceptor aircraft in order to replace the winner of the Volksjäger fighter design competition, the He 162A Spatz. The new aircraft was intended to have superior performance in order to deal with high altitude threats such as the B-29 Superfortress, but only had a 30-minute endurance figure.

Heinkel produced three different designs of the project which were submitted in February 1945. The high-altitude fighter designs brought forward by other German aircraft makers were the Messerschmitt P.1110, Focke-Wulf Ta 183 Huckebein, Blohm & Voss P 212 and the Junkers EF 128, the official winner of the competition. After being subject to severe criticism, the project was cancelled by Heinkel at the end of February 1945.

== Variants ==
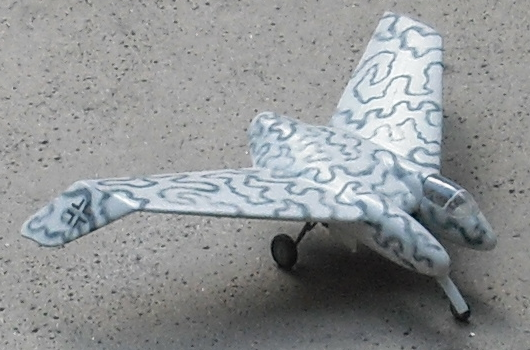
A model of the He P.1078 B variant

The Heinkel P.1078 project had three quite different variants. All of them were a single-seat fighters with polyhedral swept wings. The wings were swept back at 40 degrees and included wood in their construction. All of the projected aircraft had the wing tips angled downwards and all of them would be powered by a single Heinkel HeS 011 turbojet.

=== P.1078 A ===
Jet-powered interceptor. It was the most conventional-looking of the three designs submitted for it was the only one having a tail. Its armament was two MK 108 cannons, as in the following two variants.

=== P.1078 B ===
A tailless asymmetric jet-powered interceptor with a short fuselage in which the air intake of the engine was located in the middle between two gondolas. The cockpit was located on the gondola of the left side, while the right side gondola contained the front undercarriage leg and cannon armament.

=== P.1078 C ===
A tailless interceptor project similar to the P.1078 B but with a single short fuselage. Both the He P.1078 B and P.1078 C had wing tips angled downwards at a more pronounced angle than the P.1078 A.

== See also ==
- List of German aircraft projects, 1939–45
- List of World War II military aircraft of Germany
- List of World War II jet aircraft
