= Heinkel P.1079 =

Projected German V-tail all weather jet fighter

Heinkel He P.1079
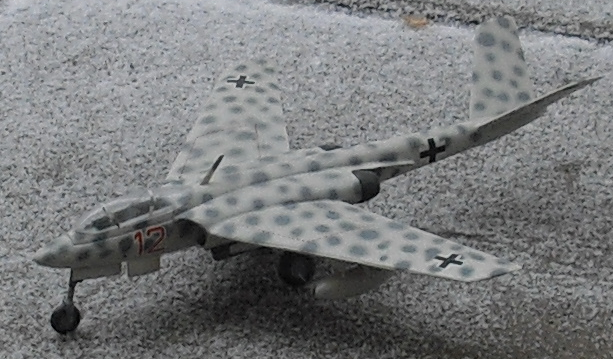
- Heinkel He P.1079A model aircraft

General information
- Type: Night fighter
- Manufacturer: Heinkel
- Designer: Siegfried Günter
- Status: Cancelled

History
- Introduction date: no evidence proved for the designs submitted to RLM

The Heinkel He P.1079 was a projected German V-tail all weather jet fighter designed by Heinkel Flugzeugwerke in the closing stages of World War II. The aircraft was only a design; it was not produced.

== Design and development ==
In 1945, the German Air Ministry requested new designs for a new generation of jet fighters such as the Horten Ho 229 and Focke Wulf Ta 183. One of these designs was the Heinkel He P.1079. The initial design, known as the P.1079A, was a V-tail night fighter with wings that featured a 35 degree sweepback. The second and third designs were flying wings with a single vertical fin which replaced the V-tail of the P.1079A. The P.1079.B2 was a completely tailless flying wing. None of the three designs were ever produced, with development work ceasing at the end of World War II.

== Variants ==
He P.1079A

Initial design with 35 degree swept wings and a V-tail. Intended to be powered by Heinkel HeS 011 turbojets.

He P.1079B

Second design had a vertical tail and gull wings. This was the single-seat, all weather, heavy fighter with the same intended engines as the P.1079A.

He P.1079B-2 (Entwurf II)

Last design of the He P.1079 and the tailless version; the wings were swept back sharply. This design could accommodate six fuel tanks in the wings. No evidence was found the design was submitted to the RLM.

== Specifications (Projected - He P1079A) ==
Data from

General characteristics

- Crew: 2
- Length: 14.25 m (46 ft 9 in)
- Wingspan: 13 m (42 ft 8 in)
- Height: 3.9 m (12 ft 10 in)
- Powerplant: 2 × Heinkel HeS 011 turbojet engines, 12.74 kN (2,865 lbf) thrust each

Performance

- Maximum speed: 950 km/h (590 mph, 510 kn)

Armament

- Guns: 4x30mm MK 108 cannon - pair in nose, one in each wing

== See also ==
- Emergency Fighter Program

Aircraft of comparable role, configuration, and era

- Arado Ar 234
- Horten Ho 229
- Messerschmitt Me 262
