= Messerschmitt P.1106 =

German fighter project

Me P.1106
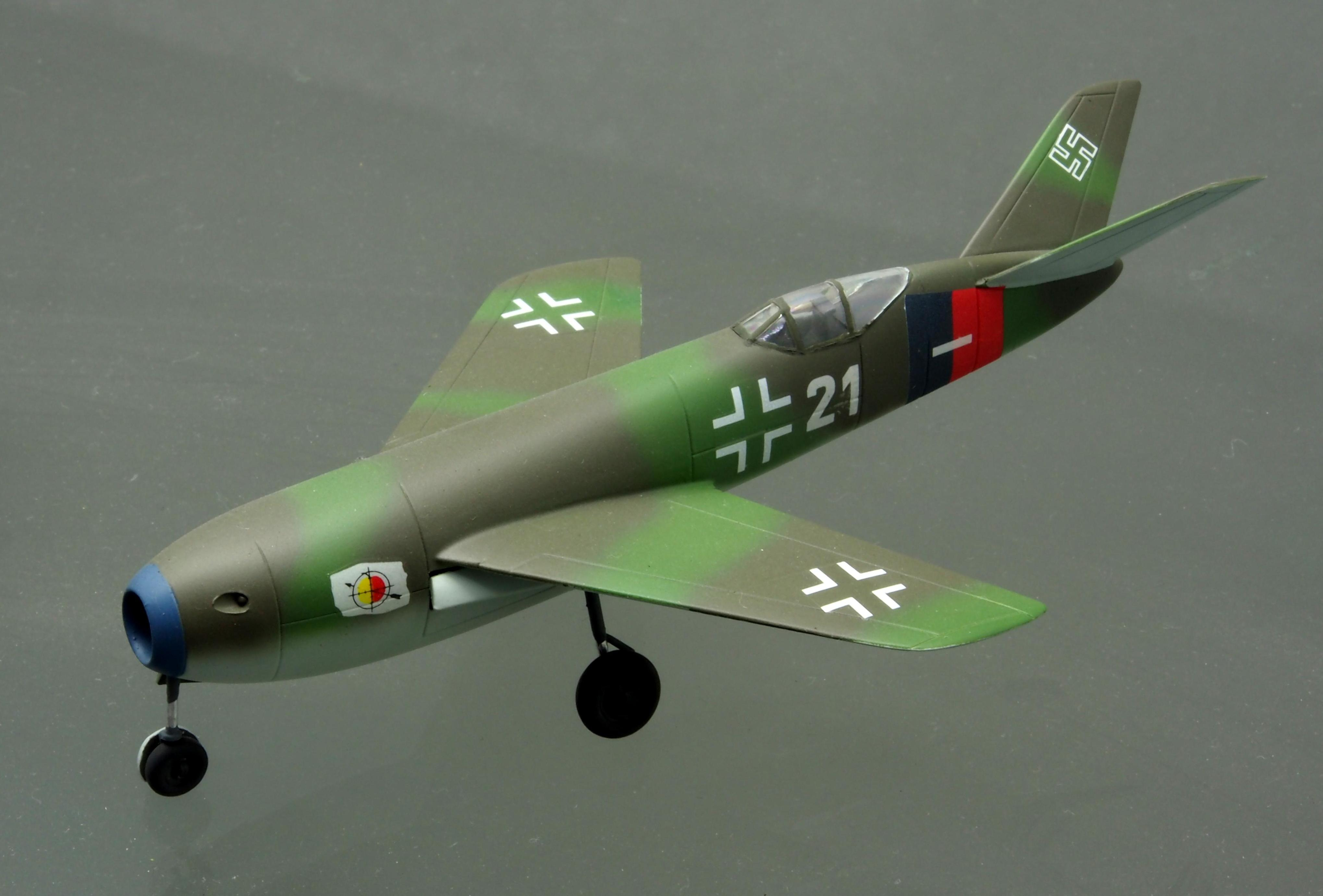
- Me P.1106 model at the Technik Museum Speyer

General information
- Type: Fighter
- Manufacturer: Messerschmitt
- Status: Project terminated
- Number built: None

History
- Developed from: P.1101

The Messerschmitt P.1106 was a proposed German fighter aircraft project near the end of World War II. It was intended as an improvement to the Messerschmitt P.1101.

== History ==
The Messerschmitt P.1106 went through several redesigns; the first version had a T-tail with the cockpit faired into the vertical stabilizer, and the later design having a V-tail with the cockpit moved slightly forward. The wings of each design were swept back at 40 degrees. The planned powerplant was a Heinkel HeS 011 turbojet engine, and armament was to be two 30 mm MK 108 cannons.

The project was abandoned since the performance of the P.1101 had not been improved on, and the 1106 cockpit had poor visibility.

== See also ==
- List of German aircraft projects, 1939–45
