= Heinkel HeS 011 =

German turbojet engine

HeS 011
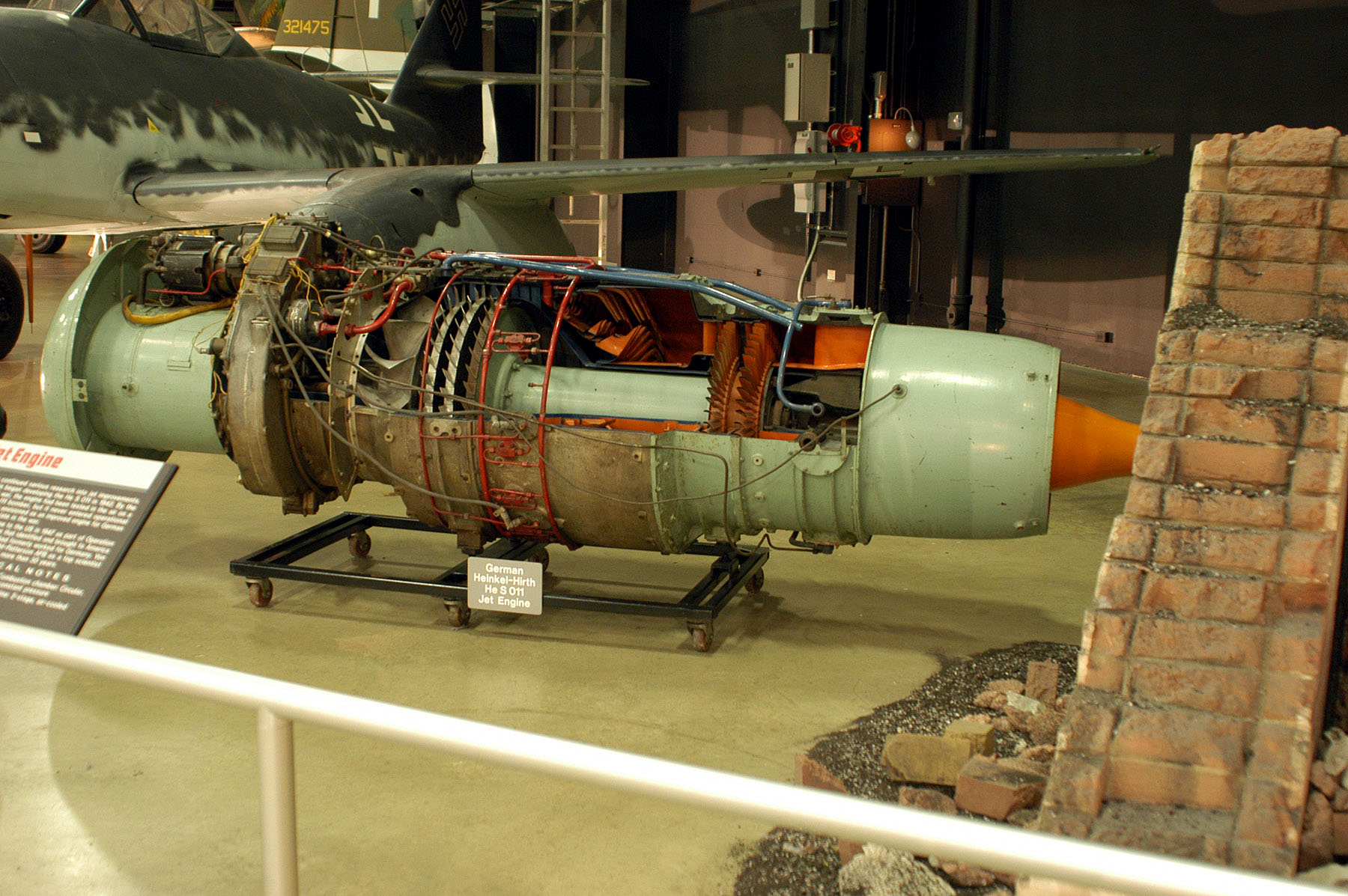
- Preserved Heinkel HeS 011 at the NMUSAF, its Riedel starter mounted atop the intake passage.
- Type: Turbojet
- Manufacturer: Heinkel
- First run: September 1943
- Major applications: Messerschmitt Me P.1101
- Number built: 19

The Heinkel HeS 011 or Heinkel-Hirth 109-011 (HeS - Heinkel Strahltriebwerke) was an advanced World War II jet engine built by Heinkel-Hirth. It featured a unique compressor arrangement, starting with a low-compression impeller in the intake, followed by a "diagonal" stage similar to a centrifugal compressor, and then a three-stage axial compressor. Many of the German jet-powered aircraft being designed near the end of the war were designed to use the HeS 011, but the engine itself was not ready for production before the war ended in Europe and only small numbers of prototypes were produced.

== Design and development ==
Starting in 1936, Junkers started a jet engine development project under the direction of Herbert Wagner and Adolf Müller, who worked on axial compressor designs. By 1940 they had progressed to the point of having a semi-working prototype, which could not run under its own power and required an external supply of compressed air.

Meanwhile, Hans Mauch, in charge of engine development at the Reichsluftfahrtministerium (RLM), decided that all engine development should take place at existing engine companies. In keeping with this new policy, he forced Junkers to divest itself of their internal engine teams. Wagner moved to Junkers Motoren, JUMO, while Müller and half of the existing Junkers team decamped and were picked up by Ernst Heinkel, who had started German jet development when he set up a lab for Hans von Ohain in 1937. The two Heinkel teams worked on their designs in parallel for some time, von Ohain's original team on the HeS 8 (or 109-001), and the Junkers team on the HeS 30 (109-006). Heinkel's efforts were later re-organized at Hirth Motoren, following the same

Helmut Schelp, who had since taken over from Mauch, felt that the BMW 003 and Junkers Jumo 004 would reach production at about the same power levels long before either of the Heinkel projects would be ready, and cancelled both of them. He outlined a new development plan with three engine classes; the 003 and 004 were now part of the "Class 1" engines of under 1000 kg thrust. These could be used in small fighters, but were only really useful in twin-engine designs. Schelp was much more interested developing "Class II" engines with thrust in the 1000 to 2000 kg range, which could power a full-sized fighter with a single engine. Schelp was also interested in seeing one of his own pet projects, the diagonal compressor, adopted. Schelp had earlier convinced Heinkel to put some effort into another pet project of his, a twin-compressor single-turbine turboprop, but had given up on this and instead offered Heinkel his new concept as a consolation prize.

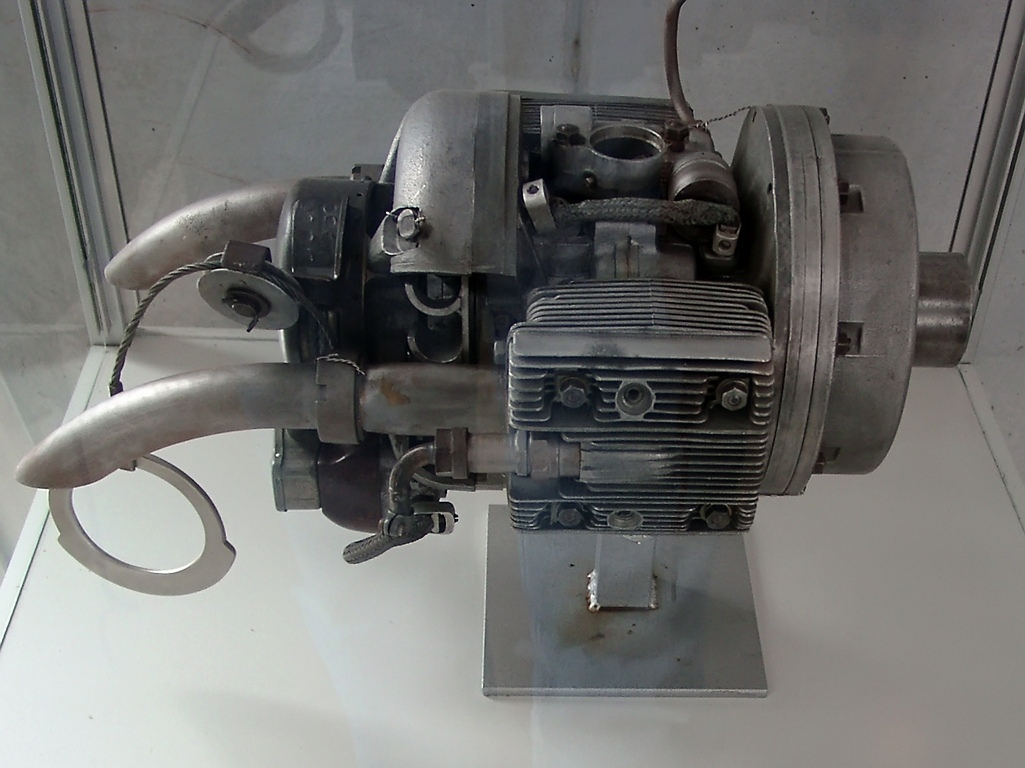
A Riedel two-stroke APU motor, which was installed atop the 011's intake passage for starting the turbojet

In some ways, the HeS 011 can be considered a combination of the two teams' designs, a three-stage axial compressor from Müller's team, combined with a single-stage centrifugal compressor from von Ohain's, the two driven by a single two-stage turbine. The engine operated at somewhat higher thrust levels, about 12 kN (2,700 lb_{f}), as opposed to about 7.8–8.8 kN (1,800–2,000 lb_{f}) thrust for the 003 and 004 respectively. The 011 shared two features with the Jumo 004, with an engine-mounted Riedel two-stroke engine functioning as an APU to get the central shaft turning during engine startup, but mounted above the intake orifice within a Heinkel-crafted prefabricated sheet-metal intake passage instead of inside the intake diverter as the 004 had done, and also had a variable geometry exhaust nozzle, with a restrictive body of differing aerodynamic shape to the 004's Zwiebel (onion) unit, that likewise traveled fore and aft in the nozzle to vary the thrust. Plans were also made for a turboprop version, the HeS 021, but the workload at Heinkel was so high that this project was later given to Daimler-Benz to complete.

Prototypes were available in 1944, and tested using a Heinkel He 111 bomber, mounting the engine on the external hardpoints under the fuselage. Over the next year, practically all German aircraft designers based their projects on the 011, very much as had been done only a year or two previously with projected piston-engined designs, such as those of the twin-engined Bomber B program, widely based on the equally experimental Junkers Jumo 222 twenty-four cylinder powerplant. Advanced high-output (>1,500 kW) aviation piston engines and more advanced turbojets proved to be something the German aviation engine industry would have considerable challenges developing into combat-reliable engines throughout the war years. As a result, and like the nearly three hundred experimental examples built of the complex Jumo 222 piston engine, the HeS 011 turbojet never entered production, with only 19 prototypes built in total. One of these was mounted in the Messerschmitt Me P.1101 that was taken to the United States, forming the basis of the Bell X-5.

In all, only nineteen HeS 011s were completed. Two museum-preserved examples survive in the United States: one at the National Museum of the U.S. Air Force in Dayton, Ohio, and one at the EAA Aviation Museum in Oshkosh, Wisconsin. The Spanish INI patented in 1951 a similar design (ES197663), on exhibition at Cuatro Vientos Air Museum in Madrid.

== Variants ==
109-011 V1
Initial prototype, delivering 10.9 kN (2459 lbf) thrust at 9920 RPM
109-011 A-0
Pre-production variant, intended to provide 12.7 kN (2866.5 lbf) at 11000 RPM
109-011 B
Improved variant, intended to provide 14.7 kN (3307 lbf) thrust, not built.
109-011 C
Improved variant to provide 16.7 kN (3748 lbf) thrust, not built.
109-021
Planned turboprop derivative (subcontracted to Daimler-Benz) to provide 2,427 kw (3300 hp); intended for Focke Wulf Fw 281, not built.

== Applications ==
Aircraft designs intended to be powered by the HeS 011:

- Arado Ar 234D
- Arado E.555/II long-range bomber
- Blohm & Voss P 212 tailless jet fighter
- Focke-Wulf Flitzer jet fighter
- Focke-Wulf Ta 183 Huckebein
- Heinkel He 162B & -C versions
- Heinkel He 343 jet medium bomber
- Heinkel P.1078 jet fighter
- Heinkel P.1079 twin-jet, 2-seat all-weather/night fighter
- Henschel Hs 132C prone-pilot seating fighter-bomber
- Horten H.XVIII jet strategic bomber (as one option)
- Junkers EF 128 tailless jet fighter (twin vertical fins at mid-wing position)
- Messerschmitt P.1101
- Messerschmitt P.1106
- Messerschmitt P.1110 (both canard/Ente and conventional versions)

== Specifications (109-011 A-0) ==
==== General characteristics ====
- Type: Turbojet
- Length: 3405 mm (134 in)
- Diameter: 875 mm (34 in)
- Dry weight: 950 kg (2,094 lb)

==== Components ====
- Compressor: Diagonal + 3-stage axial
- Combustors: 16 chamber annular
- Turbine: 2-stage axial

==== Performance ====
- Maximum thrust: 12.7 kN (2,900 lbf) at 11,000 rpm.
- Thrust-to-weight ratio: 1.38

== See also ==
Comparable engines

- BMW 003, in particular its 003D subtype
- Junkers Jumo 004
- Junkers Jumo 012
- Metropolitan-Vickers F.2

Related lists

- List of aircraft engines
- List of aircraft engines of Germany during World War II

== Bibliography ==
- Bingham, Victor (1998). Major Piston Aero Engines of World War II. Shrewsbury, UK: Airlife Publishing. ISBN 1-84037-012-2.
- Christopher, John (2013). The Race for Hitler's X-Planes: Britain's 1945 Mission to Capture Secret Luftwaffe Technology. Stroud, UK: History Press. ISBN 978-0-7524-6457-2.
- Gunston, Bill (2006). World Encyclopedia of Aero Engines: From the Pioneers to the Present Day (5th ed.). Stroud, UK: Sutton. ISBN 0-7509-4479-X.
- Kay, Anthony L. (2002). German Jet Engine and Gas Turbine Development 1930–1945. The Crowood Press. ISBN 1-84037-294-X.
- Kay, Antony (2004). Junkers Aircraft & Engines 1913–1945. London: Putnam Aeronautical Books. ISBN 0-85177-985-9.
- Kay, Anthony L. (2007). Turbojet History and Development 1930–1960. Vol. 1. Ramsbury: The Crowood Press. ISBN 978-1-86126-912-6.
- Radinger, Willy & Schick, Walter, Secret Messerschmitt Projects, Schiffer Publishing, 1996, ISBN 0-88740-926-1
