= Aviation in Austria =

Aircraft in Austria throughout history

Aviation in Austria involves the transport of aircraft in Austria, which has had to navigate some difficult historical and legal junctures, but largely has prospered since 1955.

== History ==
=== Ballooning ===
At the end of 1783 Alois von Beck Widmanstätten experimented with hot air balloons, with the first outdoor experiments in 1784.

The first fatal ballooning incident occurred on 26 December 1911, with Lieutenant Wilhelm Werner near Gmunden.

Around 1912 physicist Victor Francis Hess made a series of balloon flights, to measure background radiation. The flights went up to five miles high. Up to around half a mile, radiation decreased, but at three miles high, radiation doubled. In 1936 he jointly received the Nobel Prize in Physics for his discovery of cosmic rays.

Josef Emmer (14 April 1912 - 1985) would make many high-altitude flights, taking the world record in September 1937 at 9,374 metres, which would last until 19 July 1961.

=== Airships ===
In 1911 during Austrian Flight Week, the first air passengers were carried in an airship.

=== Gliders ===
Igo Etrich developed gliding in Austria. On 6 October 1906 the first manned glider flight took place in Austria. The glider was developed from the Alsomitra macrocarpa species of plant.

=== Powered aircraft ===
On 2 June 1909 the first airfield, with hangars, was built. After a few short attempts at powered flight lasting tens of metres, the first true flight took place on 29 November 1909. The next aircraft, the Etrich Taube, took off on 6 April 1910. The first long cross-country flight occurred on 17 May 1910 by Karl Illner, taking 32 minutes.

The Treaty of Saint-Germain-en-Laye (1919), in September 1919, prohibited the construction of powered aircraft in Austria. This was lifted in 1928.

Otto Eberhardt Patronenfabrik produced aircraft from the mid-1930s. From 1938, some Austrian aircraft works were making the Messerschmitt Bf 109.

The Austrian State Treaty, on 15 May 1955, now restored aviation to Austria. The first Austrian aircraft built after the Second World War was designed by Otto Kauba, the OFW OK-15, which flew on 16 July 1956.

One of the first powered Austrian aircraft after the war was the Oberlerchner JOB 15, flown on 20 October 1958, made in Carinthia.

=== Military aircraft ===
The first Austrian military aircraft was an Etrich Taube, on 2 April 1911. There was largely no training available for military pilots in Austria, so military pilots trained in Germany.

The Treaty of Trianon was signed in June 1920, and prohibited Austria from having an air force.

Five Fiat CR.20 aircraft were acquired in 1933. By March 1938 there were two units, with 36 Fiat CR.32 aircraft.

An Austrian Air Force was planned for 1939, but the country was annexed by Germany.

After World War II, much aviation was largely banned in Austria. In the late 1940s, model aircraft flying was allowed, and gliders only.

From 1954 pilots for powered aircraft were now allowed to be trained, with parachutists.

In May 1955, aviation prohibition was lifted, but on 26 October 1955, Austria issued its Declaration of Neutrality. This is similar to Ireland, which largely has no armed forces.

The reconstituted Austrian Air Force formed its first jet aircraft squadron on 7 July 1961 at Schwechat.

In 1980 Erich Wolf won the world military aerobatics competition; he would later be the head of the air force from 2002, until 2020.

=== Parachuting ===
Felix Baumgartner has parachuted from 38,969.3 metres on 14 October 2012, reaching Mach 1.25 in the descent.

=== Civil aviation ===
Austrian Airlines was formed on 30 September 1957. Four Vickers Viscount turboprop aircraft were acquired, with the first flight, to London, on 31 March 1958.

The 1995 enlargement of the European Union included Austria, with greater involvement in European aviation projects, such as safety.

Air traffic control is provided by Austro Control GmbH, under the Federal Office for Transport. Austria has six commercial airports.

== Helicopters ==
Austria has had a rescue helicopter service called Christophorus Flugrettungsverein (CFV) since 1983, founded by the ÖAMTC. The helicopter service has been funded by the Ministry of the Interior (Austria) since 1985, and flies the Eurocopter EC135.

== Military aviation ==
Austria has a limited air force, with about 3,500 personnel, with three-quarters being conscripts.

== See also ==
- List of Austrian Airlines destinations
- Military history of Austria
- Transport in Austria
