= Škoda-Kauba =

Škoda-Kauba Flugzeugbau
- Industry: Aircraft manufacturing
- Founded: 1942
- Founder: Otto Kauba
- Defunct: 1945
- Fate: Closed
- Headquarters: Prague, Czechoslovakia

The Škoda-Kauba Flugzeugbau was a Czechoslovak aircraft manufacturer, formed during World War II as a joint venture between Otto Kauba and the Škoda Works. Kauba produced a number of innovative designs and the company built several prototypes, with the SK 257 fighter-trainer entering limited production before being cancelled. The company ceased to exist at the end of the war.

== History ==
Otto Kauba was an Austrian engineer who developed a novel idea for a flying bomb during World War II. His personal friendship with Hermann Göring led to a joint collaboration with the Škoda Works. The Škoda-Kauba Flugzeugbau was opened in Prague, Czechoslovakia in 1942.

Kauba went on to produce a number of innovative aircraft and the company built several prototypes, with the SK 257 fighter-trainer entering limited production before being cancelled. The company ceased to exist when Prague was liberated at the end of the war in 1945.

After the war Kauba returned to his native Austria and later designed the country's first postwar type to fly, the OFW OK-15.

== Aircraft designs ==
Otto Kauba produced a variety of aircraft designs, many of them novel. Several were completed and flown, and one briefly entered production.

=== Unconventional lightweight prototypes ===
Škoda-Kauba built a succession of lightweight experimental prototypes, many of them re-using parts from earlier ones.

The V1A was a manned test prototype for an unconventional flight control arrangement, intended for use on a proposed flying bomb. The wing was tailless, with elevon control surfaces mounted on double booms trailing behind the outer wing section. Directional control was by differential drag surfaces on the wing trailing edges. It crashed on its first flight. The next example, designated simply V1, was similar but also fitted with a conventional rudder and flew after a fashion. The V2 was similar to the V1 but had a swept wing, reducing the length of the mounting booms, but its performance was little better and the flying bomb project was terminated.

The V3 was a conventional light aircraft built using parts from the V1A, the V6 used parts from the V1 to create a pusher design with twin tail booms and conventional flight controls, and the V7 cannibalised the V2 wing for another pusher with a canard foreplane though it was never completed.

The V6 design was subsequently modified as the SL6, with its twin booms repositioned and an outboard tail fitted, to test yet another novel control system, this time being developed by Blohm & Voss for their P208 pusher-powered high-speed fighter.

=== Fighters and trainers ===
The SK V4 was a conventional design for a fighter trainer and a prototype was flown.

The prototype was sufficiently promising for a production version, designated the SK 257, to be developed. The SK 257 was a conventional fighter and entered production. manufacturing was allocated to the nearby Avia factory, where the manufacturing quality proved so poor that the contract was cancelled after only a handful had been built.

Development work also began on a more powerful fighter variant, the V5. It progressed as far as wind tunnel testing before the RLM decided that it really did not need another fighter project and cancelled it in favour of the Focke-Wulf Ta 152.

=== Ramjet power ===
Kauba became interested in a René Lorin ramjet propulsion unit being developed by Eugen Sänger. He designed a novel interceptor fighter, the P14, around it with the large ramjet powerplant forming an integral part of the aircraft structure. The ramjet project was cancelled in 1944 and the P14 design abandoned.

=== List of types ===
Types designed by Kauba included:

- Škoda-Kauba V1: Piloted test prototype with novel control surfaces.
- Škoda-Kauba V1A: Variant of the V-1 with conventional rudder added.
- Škoda-Kauba V2: Variant of the V-1 with swept wing.
- Škoda-Kauba V3: Single-seat light plane of conventional design.
- Škoda-Kauba V4: Conventional fighter trainer prototype.
- Škoda-Kauba V5: Fighter project, developed from the SK 257.
- Škoda-Kauba V6: Twin-boom pusher prototype.
- Škoda-Kauba V7: Canard pusher project.
- Škoda-Kauba V8: Two-seat primary trainer prototype.
- Škoda-Kauba V9: Lightweight aircraft project.
- Škoda-Kauba V10: Trainer project.
- Škoda-Kauba V11: Advanced trainer project.
- Škoda-Kauba V12: Forward-swept research project.
- Škoda-Kauba SK 257: Production fighter trainer.
- Škoda-Kauba SL6: Outboard tail modification of the V6.
- Škoda-Kauba P14: Ramjet powered fighter project.
- Fieseler and Skoda FiSK 199: Modified Bf 109 for the attack role
