= Outboard tail =

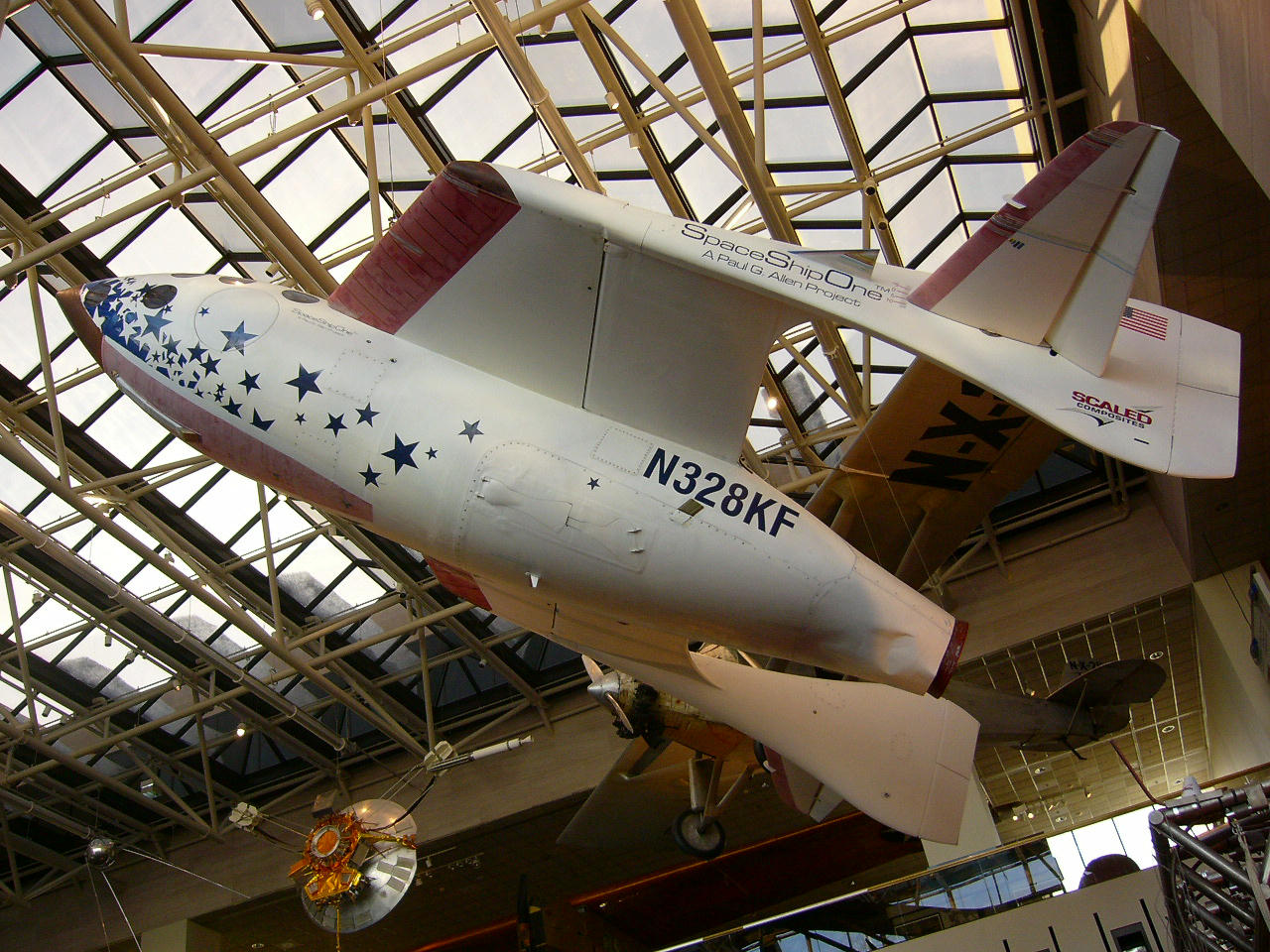
SpaceShipOne at the US National Air and Space Museum

An outboard tail is a type of aircraft tail or empennage which is split in two, with each half mounted on a short boom just behind and outboard of each wing tip. It comprises outboard horizontal stabilizers (OHS) and may or may not include additional boom-mounted vertical stabilizers (fins). OHS designs are sometimes described as a form of tailless aircraft.

The outboard tail surfaces are positioned so that they interact constructively with the wingtip vortices to significantly reduce drag, without causing undue structural or handling difficulties.

== Characteristics ==
Outboard tail

An outboard tail is located outboard of the main wing tips. Although sometimes described as tailless, the outboard tail configuration differs from a tailless wing in that the horizontal stabilizer is discontinuous from the main wing surface, typically being set further back and requiring a short boom to support it. If the wing is swept, then the boom can be very short and the front of the tail may overlap the rear of the wing. The tail comprises outboard horizontal stabilizers (OHS) and may or may not include additional boom-mounted vertical stabilizers (fins).

A normal wing tip creates a significant trailing vortex, due to an upwash of air spilling up round it from underneath and then moving inwards towards the low pressure region above the wing surface. These vortices can carry away significant amounts of energy, thus increasing drag.

In the outboard tail configuration, the tail surfaces are positioned so that they interact constructively with the upwash behind the wing tips and, with careful design, can significantly reduce drag to improve efficiency, without reducing the handling qualities or adding unduly to the structural loads on the wing.

Compared to a tailless swept wing of similar overall span, the outboard tail has a greater moment arm than if it were attached directly to the wing, while the wing need not sweep back so sharply as to have undesirable side effects.

The outboard elevators can also be used as secondary ailerons, increasing the effective control area. This reduces the variation of loading on the wing during critical manoeuvres such as landing and allows a higher design loading for the wing. This in turn allows greater safety margins when landing.

Vertical tail fins traditionally provide directional stability and control. In outboard configuration they can also enhance airflow and contribute to overall efficiency, in a manner analogous to winglets.

== History ==
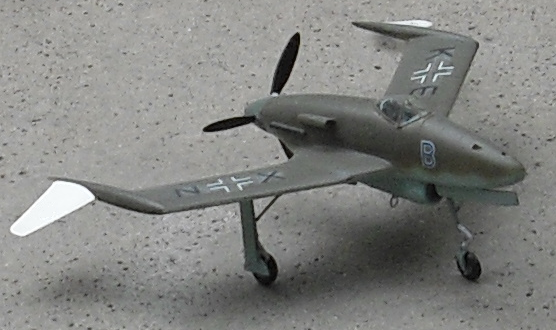
Model of the proposed Blohm & Voss P 208.02

The configuration was first patented in 1942 by French designer Robert Aimé Robert. It was developed during World War II by German designers Richard Vogt and George Haag at Blohm & Voss. In order to test the proposed control system, Škoda-Kauba adapted the V-6 design as the SK SL6 in 1944.

Blohm & Voss then incorporated the design into the P 208 pusher-engined fighter proposal. Although it was not taken up, modern analysis has shown that it would have been viable. B&V went on to produce a series of design studies and project submissions for similar jet fighters. These included the P 209.01, P 210 and P 212. B&V finally received an order for the P 215 all-weather fighter just weeks before the war ended, so it was never built.

During the late 1950s and early 1960s the principles of the outboard tail were re-investigated by NASA (formerly NACA) engineers, as a part of their research programme into design configurations for supersonic flight. They conducted analyses and wind tunnel model tests at both subsonic and supersonic speeds. Vought studied the layout for their ADAM V/STOL design project.

Further extensive studies were made by J. A. C. Kentfield and colleagues at the University of Calgary, Canada, from the 1990s on.

Burt Rutan at Scaled Composites became interested in the configuration for its potential as a variable-geometry stabiliser on a spaceplane. During atmospheric re-entry from space, the tail would rotate vertically to stabilise the plane, the rest of which remained horizontal but fell near-vertically. His first prototype, the Scaled Composites SpaceShipOne took to the air in 2003. It has since also flown on the improved SpaceShipTwo and forthcoming SpaceShip III.

The outboard tail is also seen as a natural partner to the FanWing concept and a model was flown in 2011.
