= Otto Kauba =

Engineer (b. 1908, d. 1962)

- Born: 11 September 1908; Vienna, Austria
- Died: 8 March 1962. Vienna, Austria
- Occupation: Aeronautical engineer

Otto Kauba (1908–1962) was an Austrian engineer who designed aircraft in the period during and after World War II. He also designed motor scooters in the postwar period.

== Early life ==
Otto Kauba was born in Vienna on 11 September 1908.

== Career ==
On the outbreak of World War II Kauba was selling luxury cars and had become friends with Reichsmarschall Hermann Göring, head of the Luftwaffe.

=== Škoda-Kauba ===
He developed a novel idea for a flying bomb and used his personal friendship with Göring to obtain a joint collaboration with the Škoda Works in order to develop his ideas. The Škoda-Kauba Flugzeugbau was opened in Prague, Czechoslovakia in 1942.

Although the flying bomb project failed, Kauba went on to produce a number of innovative aircraft and the company built several prototypes, including the SL6 to test the control system for the proposed tailless Blohm & Voss P 208. The SK 257 fighter-trainer incorporated a novel tapered tubular steel wing spar which doubled as an armoured fuel tank. It entered limited production before being cancelled. A later collaboration with Eugen Sänger produced the P14 design for a ramjet powered fighter. The company ceased to exist when Prague was liberated at the end of the war in 1945.

=== Motor scooters ===
After the war Kauba returned to his native Austria.

From 1949 he designed a new range of motor scooters and mopeds for Lohner. The scooter range included popular models such as the Sissy, L125 and L98, but sales eventually fell due to the increasing popularity of the motor car. The company received the distinction k.u.k. Hofwagenlieferant ("Royal carriagemakers").

Financed by Hans H. Kosteletzky, he then started the Kosty company and in 1952 launched the Kosty 100 scooter, powered by a Rotax two-stroke engine. The motor was set inside a cage and the drive chain tension was set by sliding the whole engine back and forth. However sales were poor, it has been suggested because the price was too high, and the company closed the next year.

He next formed a company in Vienna under his own name and began building the Lux, developed from the Kosty using Rotax 98cc and 125cc engines. Some 400 units in total were produced between 1953 and 1956. He was supported in this by Ragnar Mathéy of the Megu company, which had also been involved with both Lohner and Kosty. The Lux 98 was developed into the Bobby.

=== OFW ===
Kauba now turned back to aircraft. He designed the OK-15 two-seat light aircraft for the Österreichische Flugzeugwerke GmbH (OFW) at Wiener Neustadt. In 1956 it became the first aircraft to be designed and built in Austria for twenty years.

== Death ==
He died in Vienna on 8 March 1962.
