= Škoda-Kauba P14 =

German ramjet interceptor project

SK P14
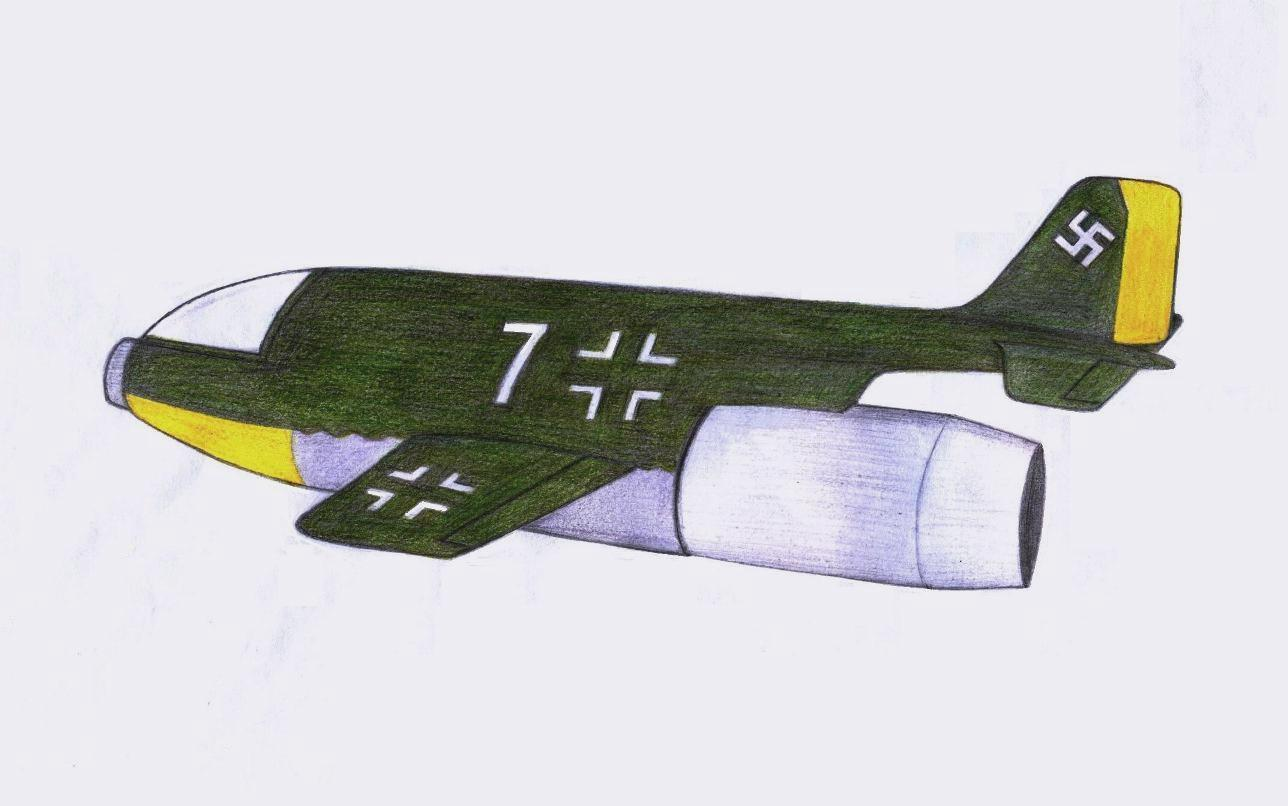
- Skoda-Kauba SK P14.01

General information
- Type: Interceptor
- National origin: Occupied Czechoslovakia
- Manufacturer: Škoda-Kauba
- Status: Terminated by end of war
- Primary user: Luftwaffe
- Number built: 0

The Škoda-Kauba SK P14 was a ramjet-powered emergency fighter project for the Luftwaffe. It was designed by the Škoda-Kauba industries towards the end of World War II as part of the Third Reich defense effort against the devastating allied bombing raids.

== Design and development ==
Engineer Eugen Sänger worked on this René Lorin ramjet fighter project after his Silbervogel proposal for a suborbital glider to the Reich Air Ministry was rejected. The fighter was an approved project in line with the 1944 designs of the High Command of the Luftwaffe for basic interceptors.

The Škoda-Kauba Aircraft Industries, located in a suburb of Nazi-occupied Prague, designed the SK P14 as a single-seat monoplane powered by a Sänger ramjet engine. Since the ramjet had a diameter of 1.5 m and a length of 9.5 m, the massive engine and its tubular air-intake duct formed most of the fuselage structure. The cockpit had the pilot flying the aircraft in a prone position above the air intake. Its landing gear was a retractable skid. In order to bring the ramjet to a speed where it would work, take off was by means of booster rockets fitted to a three-wheel detachable dolly. Only parts of the aircraft had been built when the project was terminated.

== Variants ==
The Skoda-Kauba SK P14 project had two different variants. Both of them would be powered by a single Sänger ramjet that would give the aircraft a speed nearing 1000 km/h.

=== SK P14.01 ===
Ramjet-powered interceptor with a wingspan of 7 m and a length of 9.85 m. Its armament was a MK 108 cannon located above the cockpit.

=== SK P14.02 ===
A similar interceptor project similar to the Sk P.14.01 but with a shortened fuselage and swept back wings set in a more forward position.

== See also ==
- Emergency Fighter Program
- Bell X-5

Aircraft of comparable role, configuration, and era

- Focke-Wulf Volksjäger
- Messerschmitt P.1079 51

Related lists

- List of German aircraft projects, 1939–45
- List of military aircraft of Germany by manufacturer
