= Kyūshū J7W Shinden =

1945 Japanese fighter/interceptor prototype

J7W Shinden
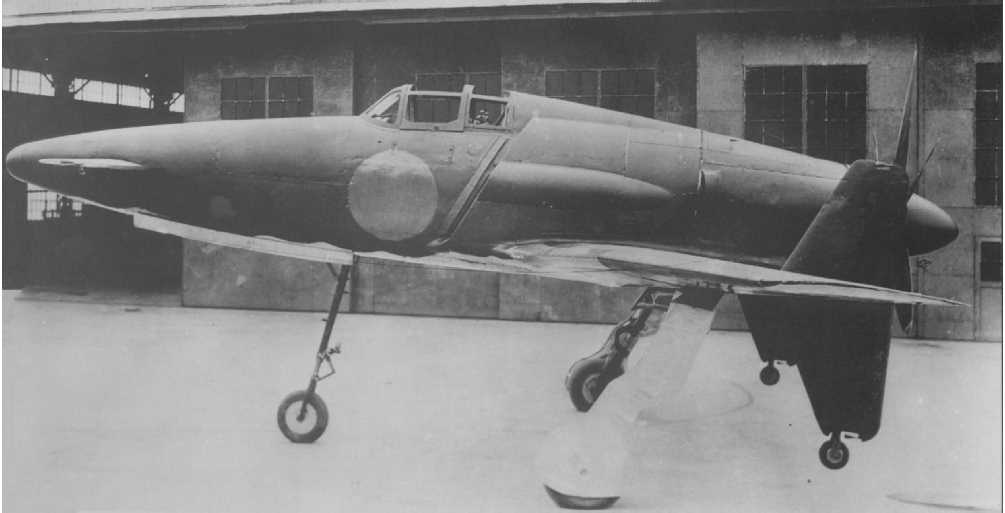
- Prototype of the completed J7W1 in 1945.

General information
- Type: Interceptor
- Manufacturer: Kyūshū Hikōki K.K.
- Designer: IJNAS Capt. Masaoki Tsuruno
- Status: Abandoned as prototype
- Primary user: Imperial Japanese Navy
- Number built: 2

History
- First flight: 3 August 1945

The Kyūshū J7W Shinden (震電, "Quaking Lightning") is a World War II Japanese prototype, propeller-driven fighter plane with wings at the rear of the fuselage, a nose-mounted canard, and a pusher engine.

Developed by the Imperial Japanese Navy (IJN) as a short-range, land-based interceptor, the J7W was a response to Boeing B-29 Superfortress raids on the Japanese Home Islands. For interception missions, the J7W was to be armed with four, forward-firing 30 mm Type 5 cannons in the nose.

The Shinden was expected to be a highly maneuverable interceptor, but only two prototypes were finished before the end of the War. A jet engine–powered version, which historians and aviation enthusiasts retrospectively assigned the speculative designation J7W2 Shinden-Kai, was considered but never reached the drawing board.

== Design and development ==
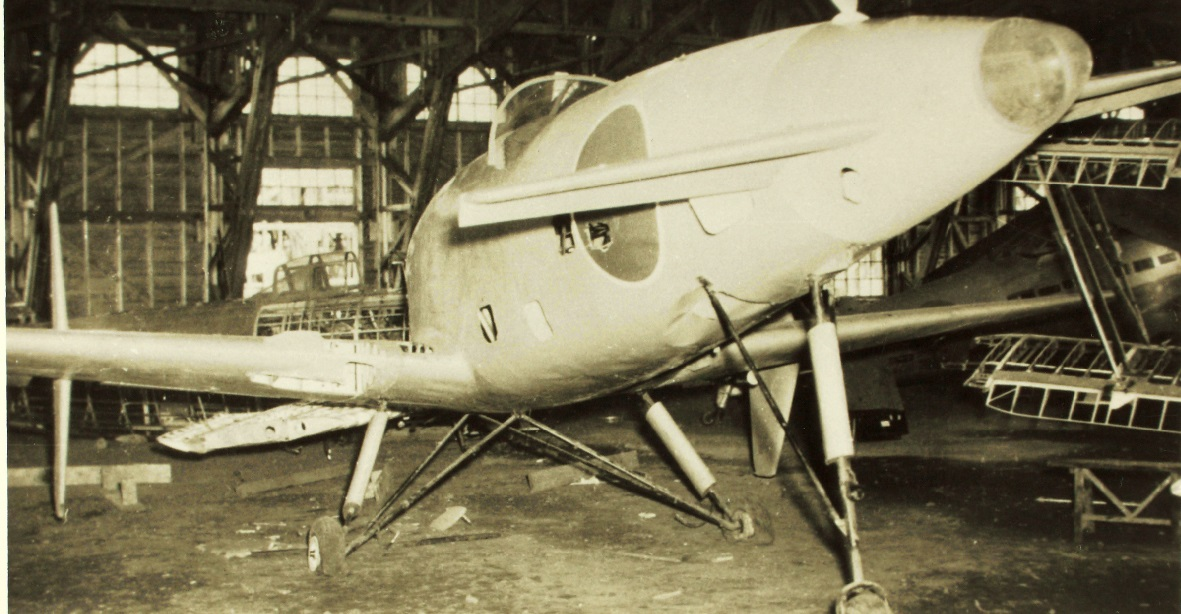
Yokosuka MXY6 research glider built to test the configuration of the Kyushu J7

In the IJN designation system, "J" referred to land-based fighters and "W" to Watanabe Tekkōjo, the company that oversaw the initial design.

The idea of a canard-based design originated with Lieutenant Commander Masayoshi Tsuruno of the technical staff of the IJN in early 1943. Tsuruno believed the design could easily be retrofitted with a turbojet, when suitable engines became available. His ideas were worked out by the First Naval Air Technical Arsenal (Dai-Ichi Kaigun Koku Gijitsusho), which designed three gliders, designated Yokosuka MXY6, featuring canards. These were built by Chigasaki Seizo K. K., and one was later fitted with a 22 hp Semi 11 (Ha-90) 4-cylinder air-cooled engine.

The feasibility of the canard design was proven by both the powered and unpowered versions of the MXY6 by the end of 1943, and the Navy were so impressed by the flight testing, they instructed the Kyushu Aircraft Company to design a canard interceptor around Tsuruno's concept. Kyushu was chosen because both its design team and production facilities were relatively unburdened, and Tsuruno was chosen to lead a team from Dai-Ichi Kaigun Koku Gijitsusho to aid Kyushu's design works.

The construction of the first two prototypes started in earnest by June 1944, stress calculations were finished by January 1945, and the first prototype was completed in April 1945. The 2,130 hp Mitsubishi MK9D (Ha-43) radial engine and its supercharger were installed behind the cockpit and drove a six-bladed propeller via an extension shaft. Engine cooling was to be provided by long, narrow, obliquely-mounted intakes on the side of the fuselage. It was this configuration that caused cooling problems while running the engine while it was still on the ground. This, together with the unavailability of some equipment parts, postponed the first flight of the Shinden.

Even before the first prototype took to the air, the Navy ordered the J7W1 into production, with a quota of thirty Shinden a month given to Kyushu's Zasshonokuma factory and 120 from Nakajima's Handa plant. It was estimated some 1,086 Shinden could be produced between April 1946 and March 1947.

On 3 August 1945, the prototype first flew, with Tsuruno at the controls, from Mushiroda Airfield. Two more short flights were made, a total of 45 minutes airborne, one each on the same days as the atomic bombings of Hiroshima and Nagasaki occurred, before the War's end. Flights were successful but showed a marked torque pull to starboard (due to the powerful engine), some flutter of the propeller blades, and vibration in the extended drive shaft.

== Surviving aircraft ==
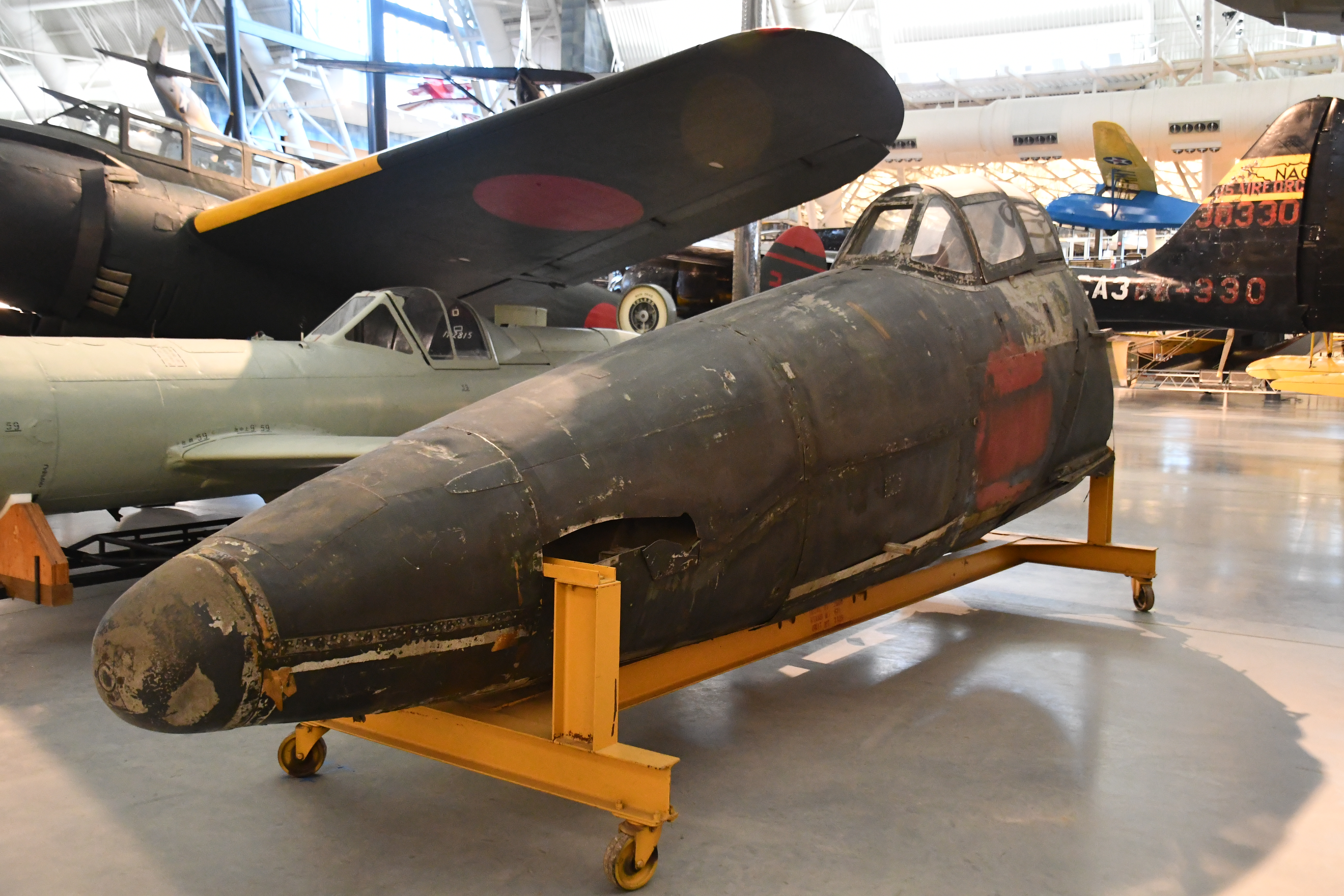
Kyushu J7W1 Shinden fuselage at the National Air and Space Museum Washington, DC

The two prototypes were the only examples of the Shinden ever completed. After the end of the war, one was scrapped; the other was claimed by a U.S. Navy Technical Air Intelligence Unit in late 1945, dismantled, and shipped to the United States. (Note: Some sources claim that the USN took the first built while others state that it was the second.)

The sole surviving J7W1 was reassembled, but has never been flown in the United States; the USN transferred it to the Smithsonian Institution in 1960. Its forward fuselage is currently on display at the Steven F. Udvar-Hazy Center annex (at Dulles Airport) of the National Air and Space Museum in Washington DC. According to the NASM, 'miscellaneous parts' are stored at Building 7C at the older storage/annex facility, the Garber Facility in Suitland, Maryland.

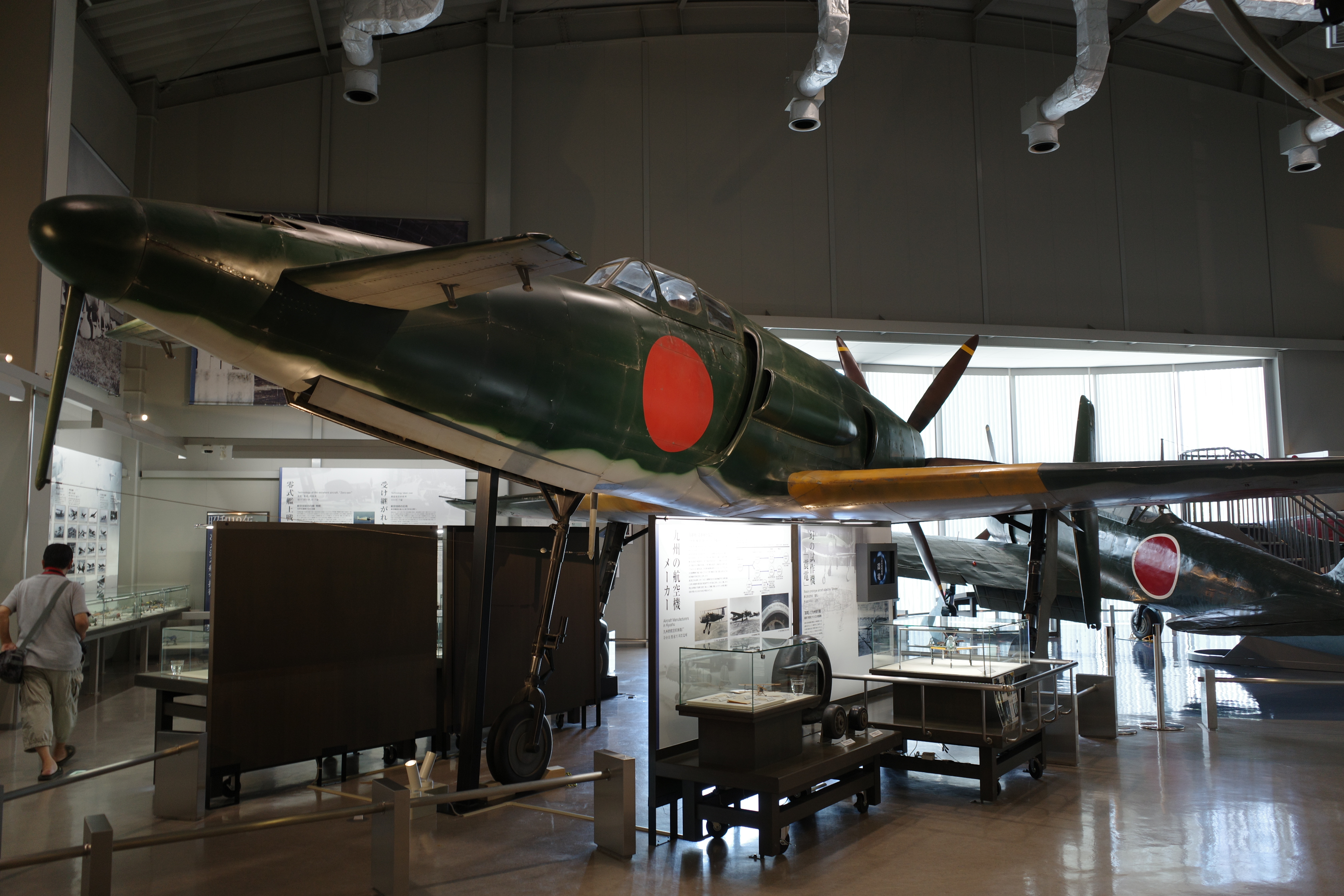
A full-scale replica of the Shinden built for the filming of Godzilla Minus One on display at the Tachiarai Peace Memorial Museum

A 1:1 scale model of the J7W1, built by a then-unknown production company, was unveiled at the Tachiarai Peace Memorial Museum in July 2022. The company was later revealed to be Toho Studios, with the scale model being made for the production of Godzilla Minus One (2023).

Another full scale model with the fictional serial number 53-102 is known to exist, having been placed on display at the Yoichi Space Museum in Yoichi, Hokkaido as part of a temporary exhibit in 2016.

== In popular culture ==
The Shinden was featured prominently in Godzilla Minus One, where one was used against the titular monster. The movie prop was an accurate 1:1 replica of what would have been an early production model that came with nose cannons and without the small wheels at the bottom of the two vertical fins. In 2022, after filming was completed, the replica plane was donated to Tachiarai Peace Memorial Museum in Fukuoka, where it is displayed today.

A modified version of the plane, designated the Sanka Mk.B, was featured heavily in the film The Sky Crawlers.

The Shinden was also featured in Ted Nomura's six issue Kamikaze: 1946 comic of 2000/2001.

The J7W's unflown second prototype is featured in the Oh My Goddess! manga, in the episode/story "On a Wing and a Prayer" (chapter 24, 1991).

== Specifications (J7W1) ==
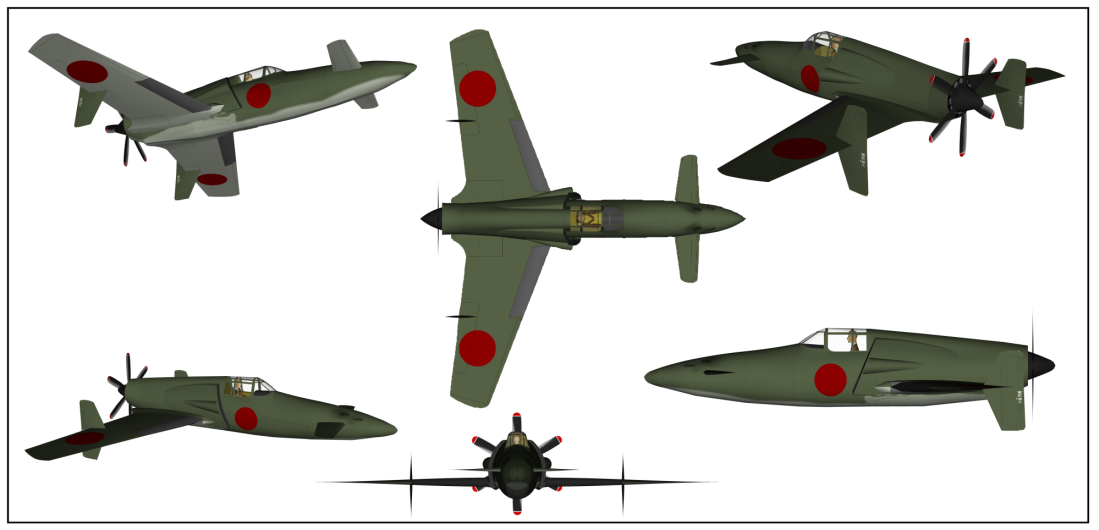
Computer graphic images of J7W1 as viewed from several angles

Data from Japanese Aircraft of the Pacific War

General characteristics

- Crew: 1
- Length: 9.66 m (31 ft 8 in)
- Wingspan: 11.114 m (36 ft 6 in)
- Height: 3.92 m (12 ft 10 in)
- Wing area: 20.5 m^{2} (221 sq ft)
- Empty weight: 3,645 kg (8,036 lb)
- Gross weight: 4,928 kg (10,864 lb)
- Max takeoff weight: 5,228 kg (11,526 lb)
- Powerplant: 1 × Mitsubishi Ha-43 Model 12 (unified) (Note: MK9D in IJNAS system) 18-cylinder air-cooled radial piston engine, 1,590 kW (2,130 hp) for take-off

1,730 hp (1,290 kW) at 0 m (0 ft)
1,850 hp (1,380 kW) at 2,000 m (6,600 ft)
1,660 hp (1,240 kW) at 8,400 m (27,600 ft)

- Propellers: 6-bladed metal constant-speed pusher propeller

Performance

- Maximum speed: 750 km/h (470 mph, 400 kn) at 8,700 m (28,500 ft)
- Cruise speed: 422 km/h (262 mph, 228 kn) at 4,000 m (13,000 ft)
- Range: 852 km (529 mi, 460 nmi)
- Service ceiling: 12,000 m (39,000 ft)
- Time to altitude: 8,000 m (26,000 ft) in 10 minutes 40 seconds
- Wing loading: 240.4 kg/m^{2} (49.2 lb/sq ft)
- Power/mass: 3.1 kg/kW (5.1 lb/hp)

Armament

- Guns: 4× 30 mm (1.181 in) Type 5 cannon with 60 rpg
- Bombs: 4× 30 kg (66 lb) or 4× 60 kg (130 lb) bombs

== See also ==
Aircraft of comparable role, configuration, and era

- Ambrosini SS.4
- Blohm & Voss P 208
- Curtiss-Wright XP-55 Ascender
- Henschel P.75
- Miles M.35 Libellula

Related lists

- List of military aircraft of Japan
- List of fighter aircraft
