= Curtiss-Wright XP-55 Ascender =

1943 prototype fighter aircraft

XP-55 Ascender
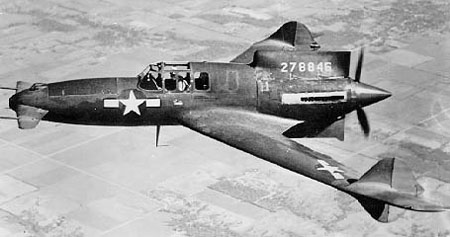
- Curtiss XP-55 Ascender in flight.

General information
- Type: Fighter
- National origin: United States
- Manufacturer: Curtiss-Wright Corporation
- Status: Canceled at flight-test stage
- Number built: 3

History
- First flight: 19 July 1943

The Curtiss-Wright XP-55 Ascender (company designation CW-24) is a 1940s United States prototype fighter aircraft built by Curtiss-Wright. Along with the Vultee XP-54 and Northrop XP-56, it resulted from United States Army Air Corps proposal R-40C issued on 27 November 1939 for aircraft with improved performance, armament, and pilot visibility over existing fighters; it specifically allowed for unconventional aircraft designs. An unusual design for its time, it had a canard configuration with a rear-mounted engine, and two vertical tails at end of swept wings. Because of its pusher design, it was satirically referred to as the "Ass-ender". Like the XP-54, the Ascender was designed for the 1,800 hp Pratt & Whitney X-1800 24-Cylinder H-engine, but was redesigned after that engine project was canceled. It was also the first Curtiss fighter aircraft to use tricycle landing gear. Development of the Ascender was cancelled when testing revealed it to be inferior to conventional fighter aircraft, and the first jet fighters were operational.

== Design and development ==
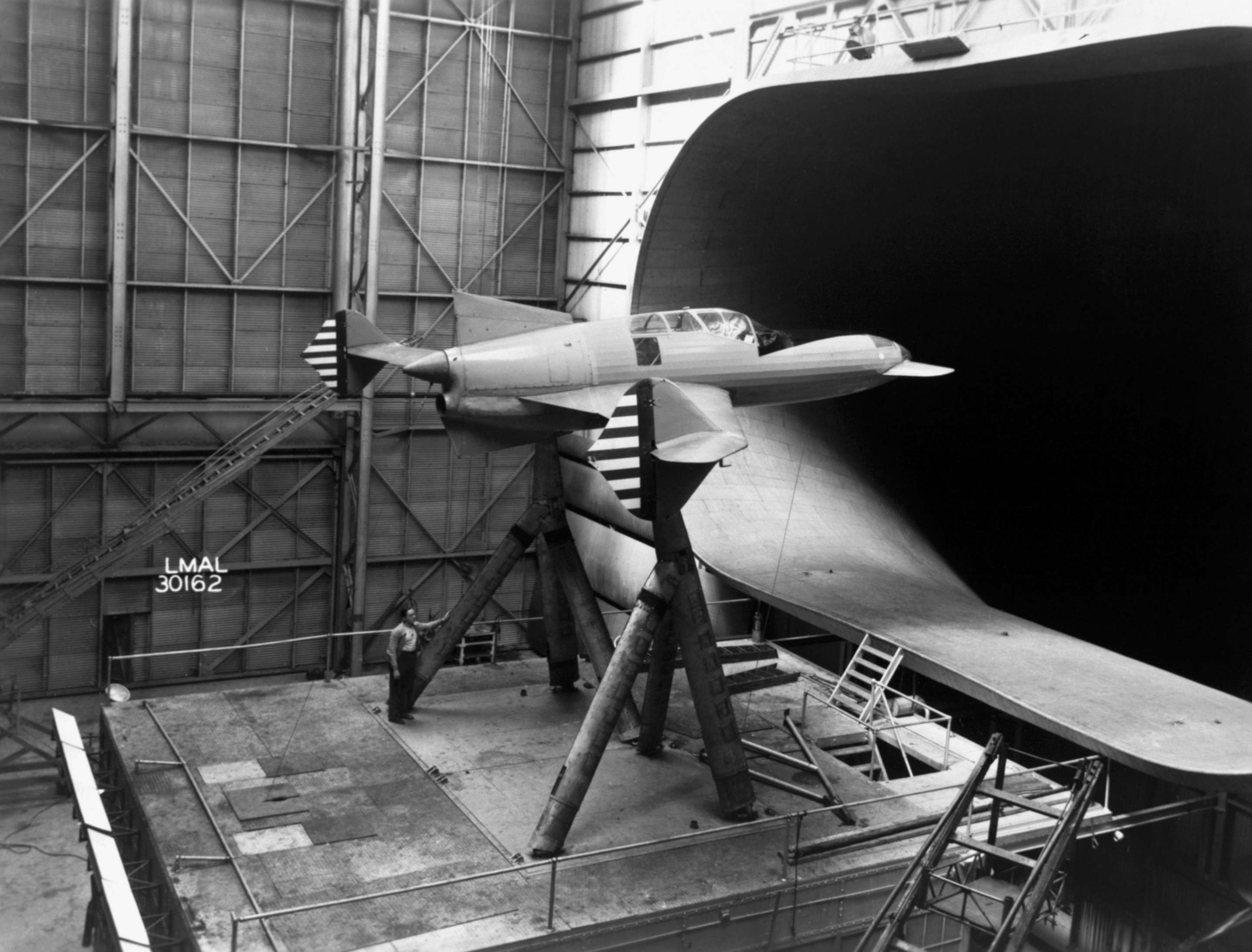
Curtiss CW-24B at Langley wind tunnel.

In June 1940, the Curtiss-Wright company received an Army contract for preliminary engineering data and a powered wind tunnel model. The designation 'P-55' was reserved for the project. The exhaustive wind-tunnel tests that from November 1940 through January 1941 left the USAAC dissatisfied with the results of these tests.

Accordingly, Curtiss-Wright built at their St Louis division a flying full-scale mockup they designated CW-24B. The flying testbed was powered by a 275 hp (205 kW) Menasco C68-5 inline engine. It had a fabric-covered, welded steel tube fuselage with a wooden wing. The undercarriage was non-retractable. The canard did not carry load but only trimmed flight. The CW-24B model completed its maiden flight in December 1941. From November 1941 to May 1942, the Model 24B logged 169 flights at Muroc Dry Lake, California. The tests appeared to show potential. The CW-24B then went to NACA at Langley Field for wind tunnel tests.

On 10 July 1942, the United States Army Air Forces issued a contract for three prototypes under the designation XP-55. Serial numbers 42-78845 through 42-78847 were assigned to the aircraft. During this time, the Pratt & Whitney X-1800 H-block sleeve valve engine was delayed, and was eventually canceled. Curtiss decided to switch to the 1,000 hp (750 kW) Allison V-1710 (F16) liquid-cooled inline engine because of its proven reliability. Armament was to be two 20 mm (0.79 in) Hispano autocannon and two 0.50 in (12.7 mm) M2 Browning heavy machine guns. During the mock-up phase, engineers switched to the 1,275 hp (951 kW) V-1710-95. The 20 mm cannons were also replaced by 0.50 in machine guns.

One feature of the XP-55 was a propeller jettison lever inside the cockpit to prevent the pilot from hitting the propeller during bailout. The jettison device was invented by W. Jerome Peterson while working as a design engineer for Curtiss-Wright.

== Operational history ==
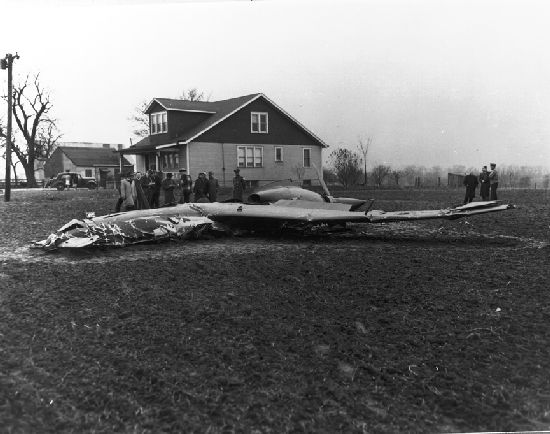
The first XP-55 following a testing crash.

Three XP-55 prototypes were built. Two were destroyed during flight testing, as a result of their propensity for sudden wing stalls.

The first XP-55 (42-78845) was completed and delivered on 13 July 1943, with the same configuration as the final prototype CW-24B. The aircraft made its first flight on 19 July 1943 from the Army's Scott Field near the Curtiss-Wright plant in St Louis, Missouri. The pilot was J. Harvey Gray, Curtiss' test pilot. Testing revealed the takeoff run was excessively long. To solve this problem, the nose elevator size was increased and the aileron up-trim was interconnected with the flaps so it operated after the flaps were lowered.

In 15 November 1943, test pilot Harvey Gray, flying the first XP-55 (S/N 42-78845), was testing the aircraft's stall performance at altitude. Suddenly, the XP-55 inverted into an uncontrolled descent. The engine failed "making recovery impossible" and it fell out of control for 16,000 ft (4,900 m) before Gray was able to parachute to safety. The aircraft was destroyed and "left a smoking hole in the ground".

The second XP-55 (serial 42-78846) was similar to the first, but with a slightly larger nose-elevator, modified elevator-tab systems, and a change from balance tabs to spring tabs on the ailerons. It flew for the first time on 9 January 1944. All flight tests were restricted so the stall-zone was avoided; included no stalling below 20,000 ft.

The third XP-55 (serial 42-78847) flew for the first time on 25 April 1944. Modifications resulting from the investigation of the crash of the first prototype were introduced during construction; the addition of four-foot wingtip extensions to improve the stall characteristics and increasing the limits of the nose elevator travel to improve recovery if a stall did occur. It was the only prototype to be fitted with armament - four 0.5-inch machine guns.

After the second XP-55 (42-78846) was given the same modifications as the third prototype, it underwent official USAAF flight trials between 16 September and 2 October 1944.

The third prototype XP-55 (s/n 42-78847) was lost on 27 May 1945, during the closing day of the Seventh War Bond Air Show at the Army Air Forces Fair at Wright Field in Dayton, Ohio. After a low pass in formation with a Lockheed P-38 Lightning and a North American P-51 Mustang on each wing, its pilot, William C. Glasgow, attempted a slow roll, but lost altitude and crashed, sending flaming debris into occupied civilian ground vehicles on a highway near the airfield. The crash killed Glasgow and four civilians on the ground.

In test flights the XP-55 achieved 390 mph at 19,300 feet but suffered engine cooling problems. In terms of overall performance, testing of the XP-55 revealed it to be inferior to conventional fighter aircraft. In addition, by the end of 1944, German and British jet-powered fighters were fully operational, and the Lockheed XP-80 was about to commence operational trials with USAAF units in Italy. Development of completely new piston-engine fighter designs was regarded as redundant; further development of such aircraft was terminated, including the XP-55.

== Aircraft disposition ==
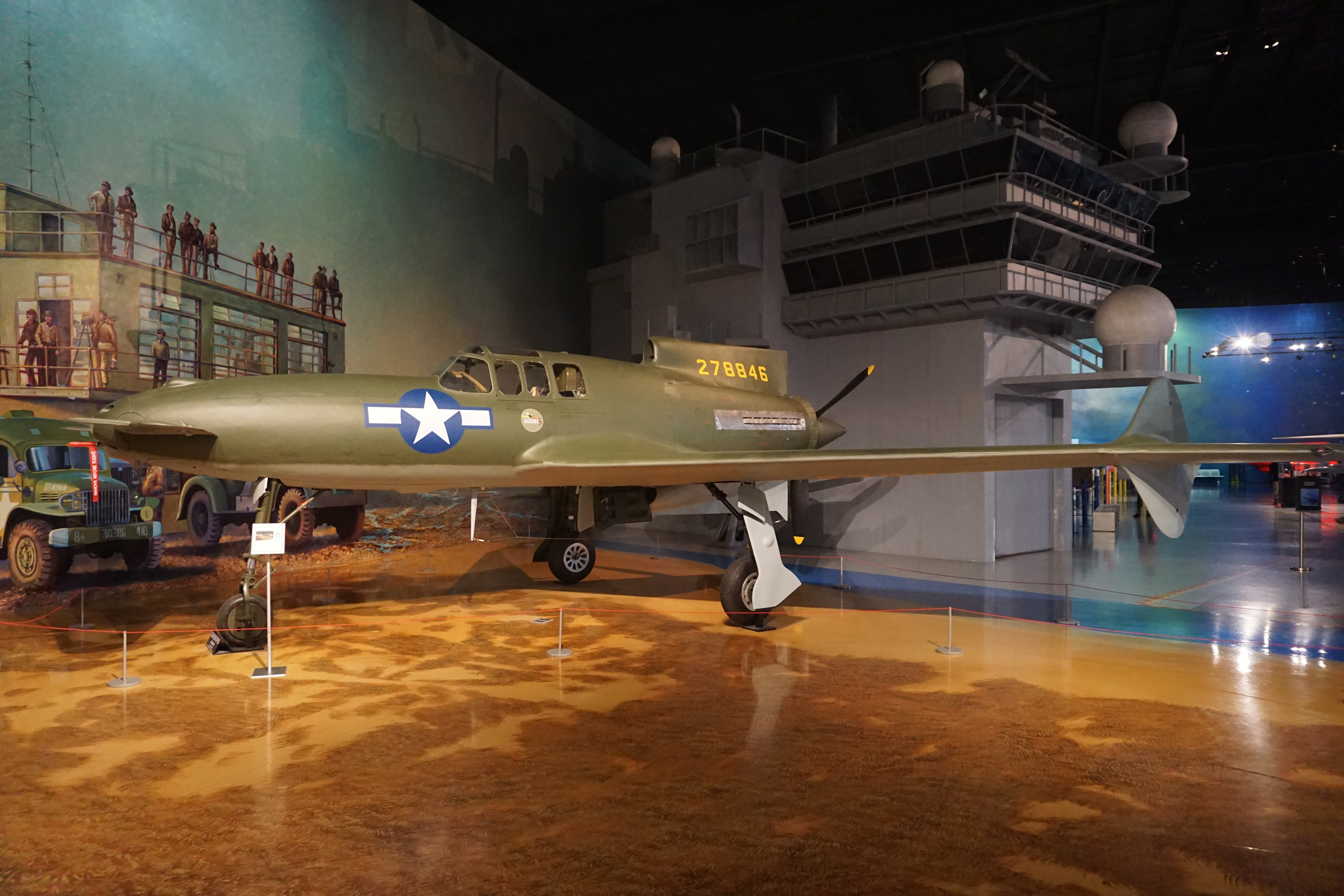
XP-55 on display at the Air Zoo

- 42-78845: crashed during vertical dive on November 15, 1943. Pilot bailed out.
- 42-78846: on display at the Air Zoo in Kalamazoo, Michigan. It is on long-term loan from the Smithsonian's National Air and Space Museum in Washington, D.C. Used for official performance tests, flying a total of 27 hours.
- 42-78847: crashed during air show at Wright Field, Ohio on May 27, 1945. Pilot killed.

== Specifications (XP-55) ==
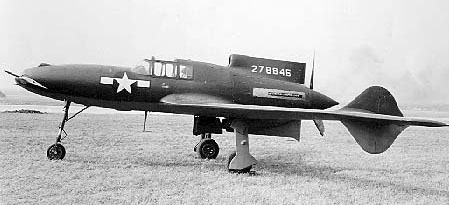
Curtis XP-55 Ascender side view.

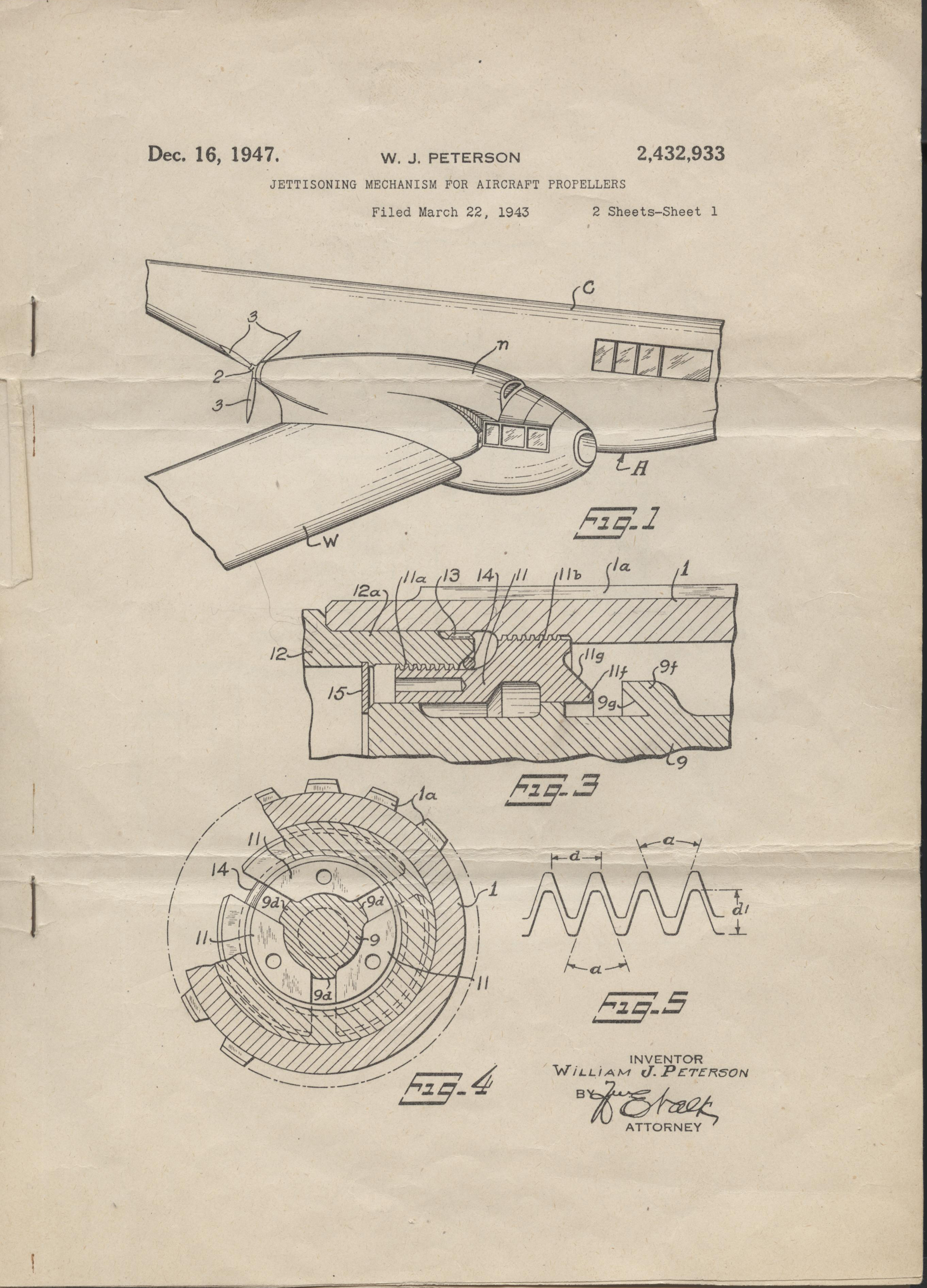
Patent for the propeller jettison system used on the XP-55.

Data from Green and Swanborough 1977 Air and Space Museum

General characteristics

- Crew: One (pilot)
- Length: 29 ft 7 in (9.02 m)
- Wingspan: 40 ft 7 in (12.37 m)
- Height: 10 ft 0 in (3.05 m)
- Wing area: 235 sq ft (21.8 m^{2})
- Empty weight: 6,354 lb (2,882 kg)
- Gross weight: 7,710 lb (3,497 kg)
- Max takeoff weight: 7,930 lb (3,597 kg)
- Powerplant: 1 × Allison V-1710-95 liquid-cooled V12 engine, 1,275 hp (951 kW)

Performance

- Maximum speed: 390 mph (630 km/h, 340 kn) at 19,300 feet (5,900 m)
- Range: 635 mi (1,022 km, 552 nmi)
- Service ceiling: 34,600 ft (10,500 m)
- Wing loading: 32.8 lb/sq ft (160 kg/m^{2})
- Power/mass: 0.16 hp/lb

Armament

- Guns: 4 × 0.50 in (12.7 mm) machine guns in the nose

== See also ==
Aircraft of comparable role, configuration, and era

- Ambrosini SS.4
- Blohm & Voss P 208
- Kyushu J7W Shinden
- Miles M.35 Libellula
- Northrop XP-56 Black Bullet
- SAAB 21
- Vultee XP-54
- Henschel Projekt P.75

Related lists

- List of aircraft of World War II
- List of fighter aircraft
- List of military aircraft of the United States
- Lists of air show accidents and incidents
