= Blohm & Voss P 211 =

Type of aircraft

P 211
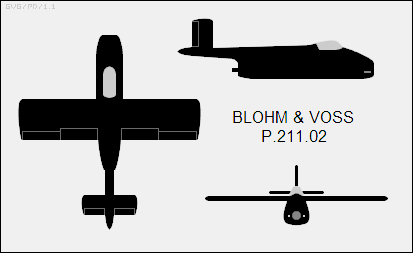
- P 211.02

General information
- Type: Fighter
- Manufacturer: Blohm & Voss
- Primary user: Luftwaffe
- Number built: None completed

History
- Developed from: P 210

The Blohm & Voss P 211 was a design proposal submitted by Blohm & Voss to the Volksjäger jet fighter competition of the Luftwaffe Emergency Fighter Program towards the end of the Second World War.

== History ==
During the latter part of 1944, the High Command of the Luftwaffe saw that there was a dire need to put up a strong defense against the devastating allied bombing raids. On September 8 they asked aircraft manufacturers Messerschmitt, Arado, Focke-Wulf, Heinkel, Junkers and Blohm & Voss to propose designs for single-engined light fighters weighing no more than 2,000 kilograms (4,400 lb) that would be powered by a single BMW 003 jet engine.

Owing to the war-related scarcity of strategic materials such as aluminum, the jets were required to be simplified in order to be built using a strict minimum of strategic materials, as well as being able to be built in adequate quantities as quickly as possible in underground factories. Despite these requirements, which would affect the overall quality of the new designs, their performance was required to surpass that of the best piston-engined fighters, being able to reach a maximum speed of 750 kilometres per hour (470 mph) with a minimum endurance of 30 minutes.

Blohm & Voss submitted two preliminary designs, the P 210 tailless swept wing jet and the more conventional, tailed P 211. Only the P 211 was progressed further.

== Variants ==
=== BV P 211.01 ===
Submitted alongside the tailless P 210 design, the P 211.01 also had a low swept wing but with a conventional tail. The single BMW 003A-1 engine was located amidships in the lower fuselage, with a tail boom extending above and behind it. Although it had good aerodynamic properties and was praised by officials, it did not go into production.

=== BV P 211.02 ===
The P 211.02 was similar to the P 211.01 but, since low cost and ease of manufacture were important, had a simpler straight, unswept wing. The wing was placed in the shoulder position, slightly below the top of the fuselage. The P 211.02 was designed by Richard Vogt and included wood in its construction. Parts of the aircraft were built, including the steel air-intake/fuselage load-bearing structure for the BMW 003A-1 engine. However, the P 211.02 did not go past the project stage as the production contract was finally awarded to Heinkel, whose He 162 Spatz went into mass-production.

== See also ==
- List of German aircraft projects, 1939–45
