= Henschel P.75 =

Proposed German heavy fighter

Hs P.75
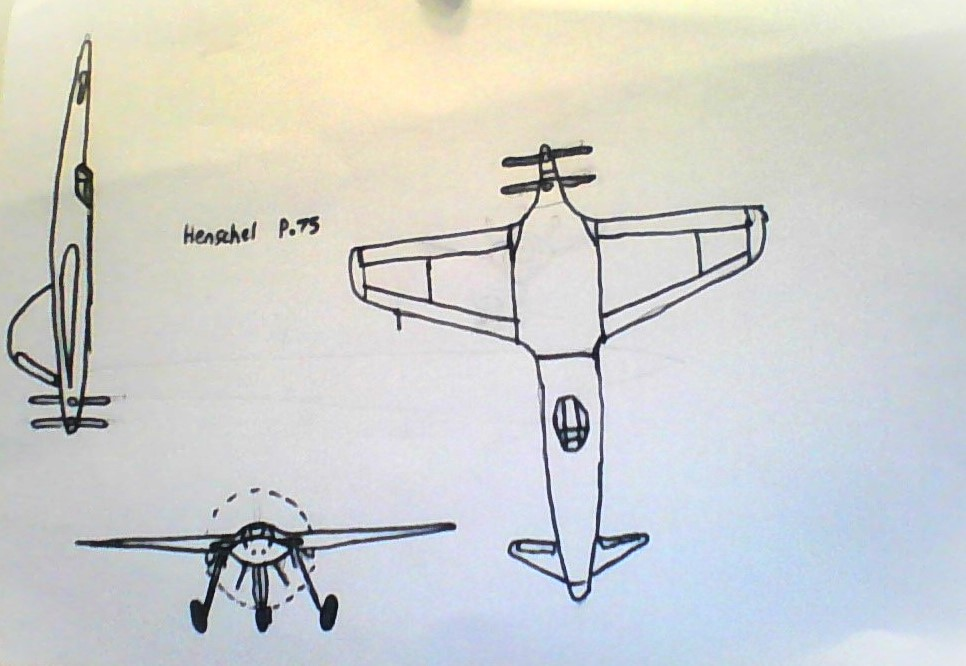

General information
- Role: Heavy fighter
- National origin: Nazi Germany
- Manufacturer: Henschel
- Number built: 0

History
- First flight: Never flown

The Henschel P.75 was an unrealised German design for a fighter aircraft created by Henschel during World War II.

It was meant to be replacement for the Messerschmitt Bf 110. It had an unusual canard configuration seen on other fighters like the XP-55 and the J7W1.

== Design and development ==
Work on the P.75 had begun in 1942 as a replacement for the Messerschmitt Bf 110. It had a canard configuration with a slightly swept wing and was to be powered by two side-by-side Daimler-Benz DB 605 engines driving contra-rotating propellers in a pusher configuration. Armament was to consist of four nose-30 mm (1.2 in) MK 108 cannons were mounted in the nose, and the single pilot would be seated ahead of the engines.

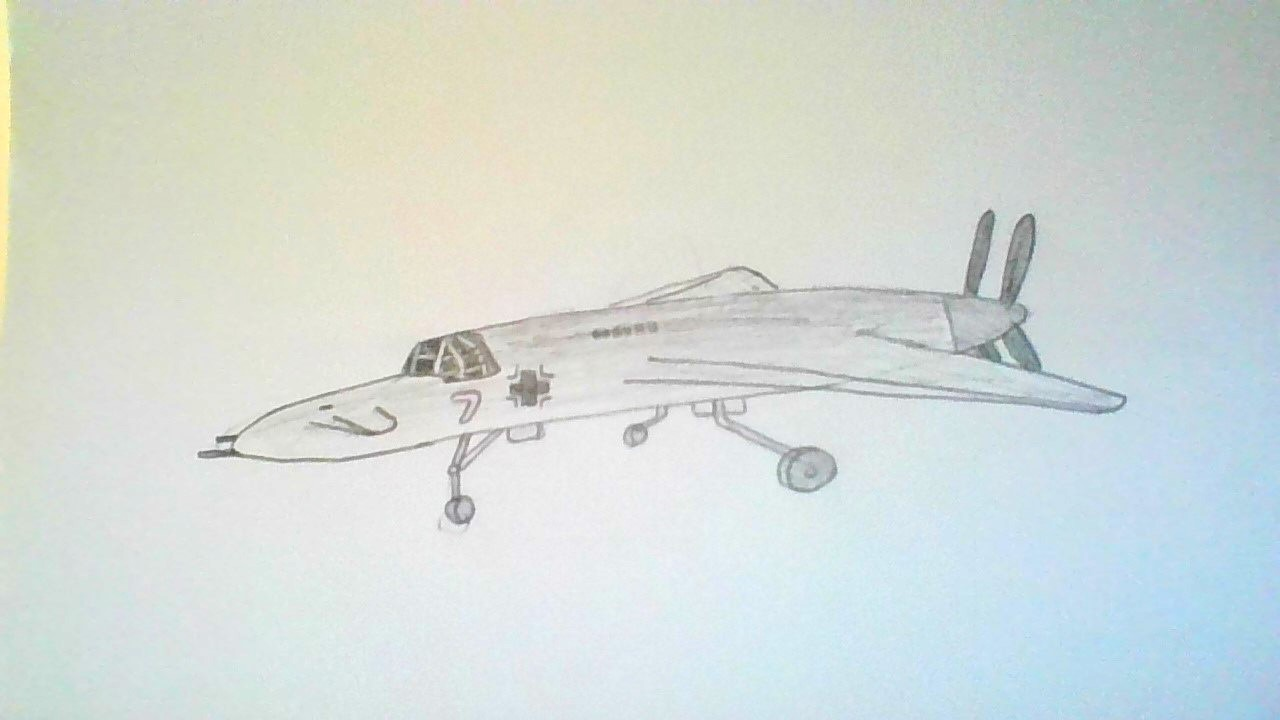
Pencil Drawing of P.75

== Specifications (estimated) ==
Data from

General characteristics

- Length: 12.2 m (40 ft 0 in)
- Wingspan: 11.3 m (37 ft 1 in)
- Wing area: 28.4 m^{2} (306 sq ft)
- Powerplant: 2 × Daimler-Benz DB 605 inverted V12 engine
- Propellers: contra-rotating propellers

Performance

- Maximum speed: 790 km/h (471 mph, 409 kn)

Armament
4x 30 mm (1.2 in) MK 108 cannons

== See also ==
Aircraft of comparable role, configuration, and era

- Blohm & Voss P 208
- Curtiss-Wright XP-55 Ascender
- Kyushu J7W Shinden
- Northrop XP-56 Black Bullet
- Vultee XP-54
- Saab 21
- SNCASO SO.8000 Narval
- Ambrosini SS.4
- Mikoyan-Gurevich MiG-8

Related lists

- List of German aircraft projects, 1939–1945
