= Erich Wolf =

Austrian air force officer

Erich Wolf is a former air force officer. He served as Commander of the Austrian Air Force from December 2002 to August 2006.
