= Blohm & Voss P 209 =

P 209

General information
- Type: Fighter
- Manufacturer: Blohm & Voss
- Designer: Richard Vogt
- Status: Design project

History
- Developed from: Blohm & Voss P 208
- Developed into: P 210, P 212

The Blohm & Voss P 209 was one of a series of single-engined jet fighter design studies. Under development in the latter half of 1944, when the single-engined jet fighter requirement was issued the P 209 was radically revised to meet the deadline but was not taken further by the RLM.

== P 209.01 ==
The initial design was a jet-powered derivative of the piston-engined P 208 tailless swept-wing proposal, which had been designed with just such a jet-powered evolution in mind. With much the same wing as the earlier craft, the jet had a new, stubbier fuselage to accommodate its Heinkel-Hirth HeS 011 engine. A triangular cross-section, not unlike the Messerschmitt Me 262 jet fighter, allowed the nose armament to be installed further back, on either side of the nose intake and cockpit. It also allowed the main undercarriage wheels to retract into the fuselage, avoiding the need for any bulges to the wing roots.

The swept, constant-chord wing had short wingtip booms which extended aft to provide mounting for outboard tailplanes. These had the same swept leading edge, which sprang from opposite the trailing edge of the wing tip, but the trailing edge was unswept. They also had a sharp downward angle (anhedral), which provided some side area for directional stability. Overall span was 10.65 metres (34.9 ft) and area 13.0 square metres (140 sq ft).

Maximum speed was calculated as 990 kilometres per hour (620 mph) at 8,800 metres (28,900 ft).

During development work the 1-TL-Jäger single-engined jet fighter programme started. The tailless design was not at an advanced enough stage to put forward, so it was set aside in favour of a more easily designed proposal.

== P 209.02 ==
In order to meet the deadline for the new requirement, Blohm & Voss drew on the P211 which had meanwhile been rejected for the Volksjäger requirement. It proved a radically different design with a conventional tail mounted on a boom extending backwards above the engine exhaust. In a major innovation, the wing of the P 209.02 was swept forwards.

The design was submitted for the 1-TL-Jäger programme but was not taken forward. Circumstantial evidence suggests that concern was expressed over the location of the tailplane too close to the jet exhaust.

== P 210 ==
The P 209.01 was further developed into the P 210, one of two preliminary designs submitted for the Volksjäger requirement. Little interest seems to have been shown in it and only the alternative design, the P 211 with a more conventional tail, was taken forward to the next stage. It was to have been powered by a single BMW 003B turbojet engine of 800 kilograms (1,800 lb) static thrust and had a wing span of 11.40 metres (37 ft 5 in).

The P 209.01 also formed the basis of the subsequent P 212 project.

== Specification (P 209.02) ==
Data from Pohlmann (1982)

General characteristics

- Crew: 1
- Length: 8.78 m (28 ft 10 in)
- Wingspan: 8.1 m (26 ft 7 in)
- Wing area: 14.0 m^{2} (151 sq ft)
- Empty weight: 2,777 kg (6,122 lb)
- Gross weight: 4,000 kg (8,818 lb)
- Powerplant: 1 × Heinkel HeS 011 turbojet engine, 12.75 kN (2,870 lbf) thrust

Performance

- Maximum speed: 990 km/h (620 mph, 530 kn) at 8,000 metres (26,000 ft)
- Range: 1,000 km (620 mi, 540 nmi)
- Endurance: 1 to 1.5 hr
- Service ceiling: 12,000 m (39,000 ft)
- Wing loading: 285.0 kg/m^{2} (58.4 lb/sq ft)
