= Škoda-Kauba SK 257 =

Czechoslovak fighter trainer aircraft

Škoda-Kauba Sk 257

General information
- Type: Fighter trainer monoplane
- National origin: Czechoslovakia
- Manufacturer: Škoda-Kauba
- Designer: Otto Kauba
- Number built: 9

History
- First flight: 1943

The Škoda-Kauba Sk 257 was a Czechoslovak-built fighter trainer monoplane built by Škoda-Kauba Flugzeugbau for the Luftwaffe.

== Development ==
=== V4 prototypes ===
The Škoda-Kauba Flugzeugbau produced the Škoda-Kauba V4 as a single-seat low-wing cantilever monoplane powered by a 240 hp (179 kW) Argus As 10C-3 engine with a retractable tailwheel landing gear. The first prototype proved very fast for its low power. The second included a number of changes and, despite increased power, was not as fast. A third was also completed.

=== Sk 257 trainer ===
The potential for development was recognized and the German Reichsluftfahrtministerium ordered four prototypes of an enlarged aircraft with a more powerful 485 hp Argus As 410 engine and allocated the designation Sk 257. The four prototypes performed well and the type was ordered into production but the build quality of the prototypes did not pass the Luftwaffe quality control inspections and after only five production aircraft had been built the order was cancelled.

=== V5 fighter project ===
Even before work on the Sk 257 began, Otto Kauba had begun work on a full-fledged fighter to have a 1,750 hp Daimler Benz DB-603 engine. Though it was in direct competition with the Focke-Wulf Ta 152, the RLM were not interested.

== Specifications ==
Data from

General characteristics

- Crew: 1
- Length: 7.1 m (23 ft 4 in)
- Wingspan: 7.6 m (24 ft 11 in)
- Wing area: 8.4 m^{2} (90 sq ft)
- Powerplant: 1 × Argus As 410 inverted V-12 air-cooled piston engine, 362 kW (485 hp)

Performance

- Maximum speed: 350 km/h (217 mph, 189 kn)

== See also ==
Related lists

- List of military aircraft of Germany
