= List of Austrian Airlines destinations =

Austrian Airlines flies to six domestic and more than 120 international year-round and seasonal destinations in 55 countries as of November 2020.

The list includes the city, country, and the airport's name, with the airline's hubs marked. The list also contains the beginning and end years of services, with destinations marked if the services were not continual, if they are seasonal, and for dates that occur in the future.

== Destinations ==
Country	City	Airport	Notes	Refs
Albania	Tirana	Tirana International Airport Nënë Tereza		
Argentina	Buenos Aires	Ministro Pistarini International Airport	Terminated	
Armenia	Yerevan	Zvartnots International Airport		
Aruba	Oranjestad	Queen Beatrix International Airport	Terminated	
Australia	Melbourne	Melbourne Airport	Terminated	
Australia	Sydney	Sydney Airport	Terminated	
Austria	Graz	Graz Airport	Terminated	
Austria	Innsbruck	Innsbruck Airport		
Austria	Klagenfurt	Klagenfurt Airport		
Austria	Linz	Linz Airport	Terminated	
Austria	Salzburg	Salzburg Airport	Terminated	
Austria	Vienna	Vienna International Airport	Hub	
Azerbaijan	Baku	Heydar Aliyev International Airport	Terminated	
Belarus	Minsk	Minsk National Airport	Terminated	
Belgium	Brussels	Brussels Airport		
Benin	Cotonou	Cadjehoun Airport	Terminated	
Bosnia and Herzegovina	Banja Luka	Banja Luka International Airport	Terminated	
Bosnia and Herzegovina	Mostar	Mostar International Airport	Terminated	
Bosnia and Herzegovina	Sarajevo	Sarajevo International Airport		
Brazil	Rio de Janeiro	Rio de Janeiro/Galeão International Airport	Terminated	
Brazil	São Paulo	São Paulo/Guarulhos International Airport	Terminated	
Bulgaria	Burgas	Burgas Airport	Terminated	
Bulgaria	Sofia	Vasil Levski Sofia Airport		
Bulgaria	Varna	Varna Airport		
Burkina Faso	Ouagadougou	Ouagadougou Airport	Terminated	
Cameroon	Yaoundé	Yaoundé Nsimalen International Airport	Terminated	
Canada	Montreal	Montréal–Trudeau International Airport		
Canada	Ottawa	Ottawa Macdonald–Cartier International Airport	Terminated	
Canada	Toronto	Toronto Pearson International Airport	Terminated	
Canada	Vancouver	Vancouver International Airport	Terminated	
Chad	N'Djamena	N'Djamena International Airport	Terminated	
China	Beijing	Beijing Capital International Airport	Terminated	
China	Guangzhou	Guangzhou Baiyun International Airport	Terminated	
China	Nanjing	Nanjing Lukou International Airport	Terminated	
China	Shanghai	Shanghai Pudong International Airport		
China	Xiamen	Xiamen Gaoqi International Airport	Terminated	
Colombia	Bogotá	El Dorado International Airport	Terminated	
Colombia	Medellín	José María Córdova International Airport	Terminated	
Côte d'Ivoire	Abidjan	Port Bouet Airport	Terminated	
Croatia	Dubrovnik	Dubrovnik Airport	Seasonal	
Croatia	Split	Split Airport	Seasonal	
Croatia	Zadar	Zadar Airport	Seasonal	
Croatia	Zagreb	Zagreb Airport	Ends 10 January 2027	
Cuba	Havana	José Martí International Airport	Terminated	
Cuba	Holguin	Frank País Airport	Terminated	
Cuba	Varadero	Juan Gualberto Gómez Airport	Terminated	
Cyprus	Larnaca	Larnaca International Airport		
Czech Republic	Prague	Václav Havel Airport Prague		
Denmark	Billund	Billund Airport	Terminated	
Denmark	Copenhagen	Copenhagen Airport		
Dominican Republic	Punta Cana	Punta Cana International Airport	Terminated	
Egypt	Alexandria	Alexandria International Airport	Terminated	
Egypt	Cairo	Cairo International Airport		
Egypt	Hurghada	Hurghada International Airport	Seasonal Charter	
Egypt	Marsa Alam	Marsa Alam International Airport	Seasonal Charter	
Equatorial Guinea	Malabo	Malabo International Airport	Terminated	
Estonia	Tallinn	Tallinn Airport	Terminated	
Finland	Helsinki	Helsinki Airport	Terminated	
Finland	Kittilä	Kittilä Airport	Seasonal Charter	
Finland	Rovaniemi	Rovaniemi Airport	Seasonal	
France	Lyon	Lyon–Saint-Exupéry Airport		
France	Marseille	Marseille Provence Airport		
France	Nice	Nice Côte d'Azur Airport		
France	Paris	Charles de Gaulle Airport		
France	Strasbourg	Strasbourg Airport	Terminated	
French Guiana	Cayenne	Cayenne – Félix Eboué Airport	Terminated	
Gabon	Libreville	Libreville International Airport	Terminated	
Georgia	Tbilisi	Tbilisi International Airport		
Germany	Berlin	Berlin Brandenburg Airport		
Germany	Berlin	Berlin Tegel Airport	Airport Closed	
Germany	Bremen	Bremen Airport		
Germany	Cologne/Bonn	Cologne Bonn Airport		
Germany	Dortmund	Dortmund Airport	Terminated	
Germany	Dresden	Dresden Airport	Terminated	
Germany	Düsseldorf	Düsseldorf Airport		
Germany	Frankfurt	Frankfurt Airport		
Germany	Hamburg	Hamburg Airport		
Germany	Hanover	Hannover Airport		
Germany	Heringsdorf/Usedom	Heringsdorf Airport	Terminated	
Germany	Leipzig/Halle	Leipzig/Halle Airport		
Germany	Munich	Munich Airport		
Germany	Nuremberg	Nuremberg Airport		
Germany	Rostock	Rostock–Laage Airport	Terminated	
Germany	Stuttgart	Stuttgart Airport		
Germany	Sylt	Sylt Airport	Seasonal	
Greece	Athens	Athens International Airport		
Greece	Chania	Chania International Airport	Seasonal	
Greece	Chios	Chios Island National Airport	Terminated	
Greece	Corfu	Corfu International Airport	Seasonal	
Greece	Heraklion	Heraklion International Airport	Seasonal	
Greece	Kalamata	Kalamata International Airport	Seasonal	
Greece	Karpathos	Karpathos Island National Airport	Seasonal	
Greece	Kavala	Kavala International Airport	Seasonal	
Greece	Kephalonia	Kephalonia International Airport	Seasonal	
Greece	Kos	Kos International Airport	Seasonal	
Greece	Lemnos	Lemnos International Airport	Seasonal Charter	
Greece	Mykonos	Mykonos Airport	Seasonal	
Greece	Mytilene	Mytilene International Airport	Terminated	
Greece	Patras	Patras Araxos Airport	Seasonal	
Greece	Preveza	Aktion National Airport	Seasonal	
Greece	Rhodes	Rhodes International Airport	Seasonal	
Greece	Samos	Samos International Airport	Seasonal	
Greece	Santorini	Santorini (Thira) International Airport	Seasonal	
Greece	Skiathos	Skiathos International Airport	Seasonal	
Greece	Skyros	Skyros National Airport	Seasonal Charter	
Greece	Thessaloniki	Thessaloniki International Airport		
Greece	Volos	Nea Anchialos National Airport	Seasonal	
Greece	Zakynthos	Zakynthos International Airport	Seasonal	
Hong Kong	Hong Kong	Hong Kong International Airport	Terminated	
Hungary	Budapest	Budapest Ferenc Liszt International Airport		
Iceland	Keflavík	Keflavík International Airport	Seasonal	
India	Delhi	Indira Gandhi International Airport	Terminated	
India	Mumbai	Chhatrapati Shivaji Maharaj International Airport	Terminated	
Indonesia	Denpasar	Ngurah Rai International Airport	Terminated	
Indonesia	Jakarta	Soekarno–Hatta International Airport	Terminated	
Iran	Isfahan	Isfahan International Airport	Terminated	
Iran	Shiraz	Shiraz International Airport	Terminated	
Iran	Tehran	Tehran Imam Khomeini International Airport		
Iraq	Baghdad	Baghdad International Airport	Terminated	
Iraq	Erbil	Erbil International Airport		
Ireland	Dublin	Dublin Airport	Terminated	
Israel	Tel Aviv	Ben Gurion Airport		
Italy	Bari	Bari Karol Wojtyła Airport	Seasonal	
Italy	Bologna	Bologna Guglielmo Marconi Airport		
Italy	Brindisi	Brindisi Airport	Seasonal	
Italy	Cagliari	Cagliari Elmas Airport	Seasonal	
Italy	Catania	Catania–Fontanarossa Airport	Seasonal	
Italy	Florence	Peretola Airport		
Italy	Lamezia Terme	Lamezia Terme International Airport	Seasonal	
Italy	Milan	Linate Airport		
Italy	Milan	Milan Malpensa Airport	Terminated	
Italy	Naples	Naples International Airport		
Italy	Olbia	Olbia Costa Smeralda Airport	Seasonal	
Italy	Palermo	Falcone Borsellino Airport	Terminated	
Italy	Rome	Leonardo da Vinci–Fiumicino Airport		
Italy	Turin	Turin Airport	Terminated	
Italy	Venice	Venice Marco Polo Airport		
Jamaica	Montego Bay	Sangster International Airport	Terminated	
Japan	Osaka	Kansai International Airport	Terminated	
Japan	Tokyo	Narita International Airport	Seasonal	
Jordan	Amman	Queen Alia International Airport		
Kazakhstan	Astana	Nursultan Nazarbayev International Airport	Terminated	
Kenya	Mombasa	Moi International Airport	Terminated	
Kenya	Nairobi	Jomo Kenyatta International Airport	Terminated	
Kosovo	Pristina	Pristina International Airport		
Laos	Luang Prabang	Luang Prabang International Airport	Terminated	
Latvia	Riga	Riga International Airport	Terminated	
Lebanon	Beirut	Beirut–Rafic Hariri International Airport	Terminated	
Libya	Tripoli	Tripoli International Airport	Airport Closed	
Lithuania	Vilnius	Vilnius Čiurlionis International Airport		
Malaysia	Kota Kinabalu	Kota Kinabalu International Airport	Terminated	
Malaysia	Kuala Lumpur	Kuala Lumpur International Airport	Terminated	
Malaysia	Penang	Penang International Airport	Terminated	
Maldives	Malé	Velana International Airport	Seasonal	
Mali	Bamako	Bamako–Sénou International Airport	Terminated	
Mauritius	Port Louis	Sir Seewoosagur Ramgoolam International Airport	Seasonal	
Mexico	Cancún	Cancún International Airport	Seasonal	
Mexico	Mexico City	Mexico City International Airport	Terminated	
Moldova	Chişinău	Chișinău Eugen Doga International Airport		
Montenegro	Podgorica	Podgorica Airport		
Montenegro	Tivat	Tivat Airport	Seasonal	
Morocco	Agadir	Agadir–Al Massira Airport	Terminated	
Morocco	Casablanca	Mohammed V International Airport	Terminated	
Morocco	Marrakesh	Marrakesh Menara Airport		
Myanmar	Naypyidaw	Naypyidaw International Airport	Terminated	
Nepal	Kathmandu	Tribhuvan International Airport	Terminated	
Netherlands	Amsterdam	Amsterdam Airport Schiphol		
Nigeria	Abuja	Nnamdi Azikiwe International Airport	Terminated	
Nigeria	Lagos	Murtala Muhammed International Airport	Terminated	
North Macedonia	Ohrid	Ohrid St. Paul the Apostle Airport		
North Macedonia	Skopje	Skopje International Airport		
Norway	Oslo	Oslo Gardermoen Airport		
Norway	Tromsø	Tromsø Airport	Terminated	
Oman	Muscat	Muscat International Airport	Terminated	
Philippines	Manila	Ninoy Aquino International Airport	Terminated	
Poland	Katowice	Katowice International Airport	Terminated	
Poland	Kraków	Kraków John Paul II International Airport		
Poland	Poznań	Poznań-Ławica Airport	Terminated	
Poland	Warsaw	Warsaw Chopin Airport		
Poland	Wrocław	Wrocław Airport	Terminated	
Portugal	Funchal	Madeira Airport	Seasonal	
Portugal	Lisbon	Lisbon Airport	Terminated	
Portugal	Porto	Porto Airport		
Qatar	Doha	Doha International Airport	Airport Closed	
Republic of the Congo	Brazzaville	Maya-Maya Airport	Terminated	
Romania	Baia Mare	Baia Mare Airport	Terminated	
Romania	Bucharest	Henri Coandă International Airport		
Romania	Iași	Iași International Airport		
Romania	Sibiu	Sibiu International Airport		
Romania	Timișoara	Traian Vuia International Airport	Terminated	
Russia	Krasnodar	Krasnodar International Airport	Terminated	
Russia	Moscow	Moscow Domodedovo Airport	Terminated	
Russia	Moscow	Sheremetyevo International Airport	Terminated	
Russia	Nizhny Novgorod	Nizhny Novgorod International Airport	Terminated	
Russia	Rostov-on-Don	Rostov-on-Don Airport	Terminated	
Russia	Saint Petersburg	Pulkovo International Airport ^{Seasonal}	Terminated	
Russia	Sochi	Sochi International Airport	Terminated	
Russia	Yekaterinburg	Koltsovo International Airport	Terminated	
Saudi Arabia	Jeddah	King Abdulaziz International Airport	Terminated	
Saudi Arabia	Riyadh	King Khalid International Airport	Terminated	
Serbia	Belgrade	Belgrade Nikola Tesla Airport		
Seychelles	Mahé	Seychelles International Airport	Terminated	
Sierra Leone	Freetown	Lungi International Airport	Terminated	
Singapore	Singapore	Changi Airport	Terminated	
Sint Maarten	Philipsburg	Princess Juliana International Airport	Terminated	
Slovakia	Bratislava	Bratislava Airport	Terminated	
Slovakia	Košice	Košice International Airport		
Slovenia	Ljubljana	Ljubljana Jože Pučnik Airport	Terminated	
South Africa	Cape Town	Cape Town International Airport ^{Seasonal}	Terminated	
South Africa	Johannesburg	O. R. Tambo International Airport	Terminated	
South Korea	Seoul	Incheon International Airport	Terminated	
Spain	Barcelona	Josep Tarradellas Barcelona–El Prat Airport		
Spain	Fuerteventura	Fuerteventura Airport	Seasonal	
Spain	Ibiza	Ibiza Airport	Seasonal	
Spain	Lanzarote	Lanzarote Airport	Terminated	
Spain	Las Palmas	Gran Canaria Airport		
Spain	Madrid	Adolfo Suárez Madrid–Barajas Airport	Terminated	
Spain	Málaga	Málaga Airport		
Spain	Menorca	Menorca Airport	Seasonal	
Spain	Palma de Mallorca	Palma de Mallorca Airport		
Spain	Seville	Seville Airport	Seasonal	
Spain	Tenerife	Tenerife South Airport		
Spain	Valencia	Valencia Airport		
Sri Lanka	Colombo	Bandaranaike International Airport	Terminated	
Sweden	Gothenburg	Göteborg Landvetter Airport	Seasonal	
Sweden	Stockholm	Stockholm Arlanda Airport		
Switzerland	Geneva	Geneva Airport		
Switzerland	St. Gallen	St. Gallen–Altenrhein Airport	Terminated	
Switzerland	Zurich	Zurich Airport		
Switzerland; France; Germany	Basel; Mulhouse; Freiburg	EuroAirport Basel Mulhouse Freiburg		
Tanzania	Dar es Salaam	Julius Nyerere International Airport	Terminated	
Thailand	Bangkok	Don Mueang International Airport	Terminated	
Thailand	Bangkok	Suvarnabhumi Airport		
Tunisia	Monastir	Monastir Habib Bourguiba International Airport	Seasonal charter	
Turkey	Antalya	Antalya Airport	Seasonal	
Turkey	Bodrum	Milas–Bodrum Airport	Terminated	
Turkey	Dalaman	Dalaman Airport	Seasonal	
Turkey	Istanbul	Istanbul Atatürk Airport	Airport closed	
Turkey	Istanbul	Istanbul Airport	Begins in 2026	
Ukraine	Dnipro	Dnipro International Airport	Terminated	
Ukraine	Kyiv	Boryspil International Airport	Suspended	
Ukraine	Lviv	Lviv Danylo Halytskyi International Airport	Suspended	
Ukraine	Odesa	Odesa International Airport	Suspended	
Ukraine	Zaporizhzhia	Zaporizhzhia International Airport	Suspended	
United Arab Emirates	Abu Dhabi	Abu Dhabi International Airport	Terminated	
United Arab Emirates	Dubai	Dubai International Airport	Seasonal	
United Kingdom	Birmingham	Birmingham Airport	Terminated	
United Kingdom	Edinburgh	Edinburgh Airport	Seasonal	
United Kingdom	London	Gatwick Airport	Terminated	
United Kingdom	London	Heathrow Airport		
United Kingdom	London	London City Airport	Terminated	
United Kingdom	London	London Stansted Airport	Terminated	
United Kingdom	Manchester	Manchester Airport	Terminated	
United States	Atlanta	Hartsfield–Jackson Atlanta International Airport	Terminated	
United States	Boston	Logan International Airport		
United States	Chicago	O'Hare International Airport		
United States	Los Angeles	Los Angeles International Airport	Seasonal	
United States	Miami	Miami International Airport	Terminated	
United States	New York City	John F. Kennedy International Airport		
United States	Newark	Newark Liberty International Airport		
United States	San Francisco	San Francisco International Airport	Terminated	
United States	Washington, D.C.	Washington Dulles International Airport		
Zimbabwe	Harare	Robert Gabriel Mugabe International Airport	Terminated	
