= Blohm & Voss P 208 =

Design project for an interceptor

P 208
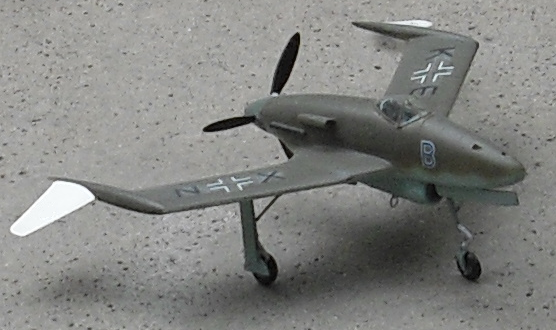
- Model of the BV P 208.02

General information
- Type: Fighter
- Manufacturer: Blohm & Voss
- Designer: Richard Vogt
- Status: Design project

History
- Developed into: Blohm & Voss P 209

The Blohm & Voss P.208 was a design project for a tailless swept-wing propeller-powered interceptor designed by the German company Blohm & Voss towards the end of the Second World War.

It was the first of several such "arrow-wing" designs, the later ones all being jet powered.

== History ==
Around 1943-44, it became apparent to German designers that for high-speed flight, the swept wing offered many advantages. The chief designer at Blohm & Voss, Richard Vogt, realised that if the tail could be moved out of the way then the engine and propeller could be moved aft in a pusher arrangement, without the need for a long propeller shaft. This left the nose free for an excellent pilot's field of view and the installation of heavy armament. Vogt came up with the idea of placing the tail surfaces at the ends of the swept-back wings. In order to obtain enough control authority for the tail, without sweeping the wing back too far, Vogt devised short tailbooms on the wing tips, to which vertical fins and outboard horizontal stabilisers were fitted.

The Škoda-Kauba SK V-6 design was modified to create the SK SL6, being given a split tail on twin booms, in order to carry out flight testing for the new wing and tail control system.

The P208.01 was developed in 1944, when in Germany there were already jet aircraft in production. The decision to fit a conventional engine to the aircraft was made because the existing jet engines had not yet reached the desired performance. Thus the project went ahead in such a way that the design could be re-fitted with a jet engine when the technical difficulties were solved, eventually leading to the Blohm & Voss P 212 jet aircraft project.

The engine was fitted at the back of the cockpit with the propeller pushing the plane forward. The tail unit was incorporated into the swept wings, which provided an improved performance. In order to withstand the added stress the wings had steel reinforcements.

Three different variants of the plane were designed. All had a retractable tricycle landing gear. The dimensions were similar and there was also almost no difference in weight between the three projected aircraft.

=== P 208.01 ===
A variant fitted with a Junkers Jumo 222 E, F or N engine.

=== P 208.02 ===
A variant powered by an Argus As 413 unit giving a maximum of 4,000 hp (made of two Junkers Jumo 213 engines). The plane had a larger radiator and the wingtip booms had small vertical fins at the trailing edge.

=== P 208.03 ===
Three proposals were made for this variant: P 208.03.01 and P 208.03.02 would be fitted with a Daimler-Benz DB 603L engine, while P 208.03.03 would have a Daimler-Benz DB 603N.

== Specification (P 208.03) ==
Data from Pohlmann (1982)

General characteristics

- Crew: 1
- Length: 9.20 m (30 ft 2 in)
- Wingspan: 12.08 m (39 ft 8 in)
- Wing area: 19.00 m^{2} (204.5 sq ft)
- Empty weight: 4,125 kg (9,094 lb)
- Gross weight: 5,000 kg (11,023 lb)
- Powerplant: 1 × Daimler-Benz DB 603L or N liquid-cooled V12

Performance

- Maximum speed: 790 km/h (490 mph, 430 kn) at 9,000 metres (30,000 ft)
- Endurance: 1.85 hr
- Service ceiling: 11,400 m (37,400 ft)
- Wing loading: 263 kg/m^{2} (54 lb/sq ft)

== See also ==
- List of German aircraft projects, 1939–45
- Curtiss-Wright XP-55 Ascender
- Henschel P.75
- Kyushu J7W Shinden
- Northrop XP-56
