= OFW OK-15 =

OK-15

General information
- Type: Two-seat light monoplane
- National origin: Austria
- Manufacturer: OFW
- Designer: Otto Kauba
- Number built: 1

History
- First flight: 16 July 1956

The OFW OK-15 was a 1950s Austrian two-seat light aircraft. Designed by Otto Kauba and built by the Österreichische Flugzeugwerke GmbH (OFW) at Wiener Neustadt, it was the first aircraft to be designed and built in Austria for 20 years.

== Design and development ==
The OK-15 was a light sports monoplane of conventional design with a low wing, enclosed side-by-side two-seat cockpit and fixed undercarriage with tailwheel. It was manufactured using traditional materials of metal, wood and fabric, and stressed for aerobatics. It had a span of 7.6 m (25 ft) and length 6.5 m (21 ft).

The aircraft was powered by a 105 horsepower (78 kW) Walter Minor 4-III piston engine, giving it an estimated cruise speed of 202 km/h (126 mph; 109 kn).

The only prototype was registered OE-VAM and first flown on 16 July 1956. Subsequent fight tests showed its handling to be unsatisfactory and it was not put into production.

== Specification ==
Data from Österreichs Luftfahrt in Einzeldarstellungen: Propeller-Luftfahrzeugkonstruktionen seit 1945, Jane's All the World's Aircraft 1958-59.

General characteristics

- Crew: 2
- Length: 6.50 m (21 ft 4 in)
- Wingspan: 7.60 m (24 ft 11 in)
- Height: 1.73 m (5 ft 8 in)
- Wing area: 11.0 m^{2} (118 sq ft)
- Aspect ratio: 5.25
- Empty weight: 505 kg (1,113 lb)
- Gross weight: 788 kg (1,737 lb)
- Fuel capacity: 90 L (24 US gal; 20 imp gal)
- Powerplant: 1 × Walter Minor 4-III 4-cylinder inverted inline air-cooled, 78 kW (105 hp)
- Propellers: 2-bladed wooden fixed-pitch propellerfor take-off

60 kW (80 hp) continuous at 2,300 rpm

Performance

- Maximum speed: 202 km/h (126 mph, 109 kn) at 300 m (980 ft)
- Cruise speed: 180 km/h (110 mph, 97 kn) at 300 m (980 ft)
- Landing speed: 75 km/h (47 mph; 40 kn)
- Range: 630 km (390 mi, 340 nmi)
- Endurance: 3 hours 30 minutes with reserve
- Service ceiling: 4,100 m (13,500 ft)
- Rate of climb: 3.33 m/s (655 ft/min)
- Time to altitude: 1,000 m (3,300 ft) in 6 minutes 45 seconds
- Wing loading: 71.63 kg/m^{2} (14.67 lb/sq ft)
- Power/mass: 0.099 kW/kg (0.06 hp/lb)
- Take-off run: 200 m (660 ft) on grass
- Landing run: 110 m (360 ft) on grass
