= René Lorin =

French engineer and inventor

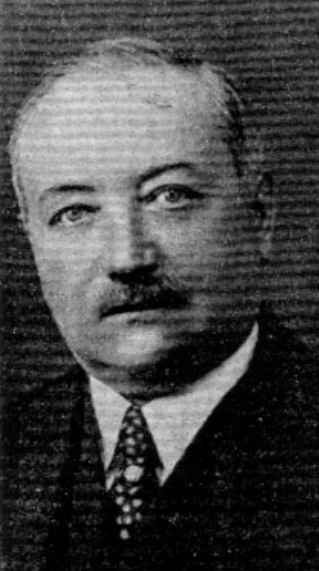
- Born: 24 March 1877
- Died: 16 January 1933
- Engineering career
- Significant design: Ramjet

René Lorin (24 March 1877 – 16 January 1933) was a French aerospace engineer and inventor of the ramjet.

In 1908 Lorin patented, FR390256, the first subsonic ramjet design. He published the principles of a ramjet in articles in the journal L'Aérophile from 1908 to 1913, expressing the idea that the exhaust from internal combustion engines could be directed into nozzles to create jet propulsion. He could not test this invention since there was no way at the time for an aircraft to go fast enough for a ramjet to function properly.

When René Leduc applied for a patent on a ramjet design in 1933, FR705648, he discovered Lorin's publications and tried to contact him, only to learn that he had recently died. Leduc thereafter paid homage to Lorin's work.

René Lorin is a graduate of the École Centrale Paris.
