= List of World War II military aircraft of Germany =

This list covers aircraft of the German Luftwaffe during the Second World War from 1939 to 1945. Numerical designations are largely within the RLM designation system.

The Luftwaffe officially existed from 1933–1945 but training had started in the 1920s, before the Nazi seizure of power, and many aircraft made in the inter-war years were used during World War II. The most significant aircraft that participated in World War II are highlighted in blue. Pre-war aircraft not used after 1938 are excluded, as are projects and aircraft that did not fly. The listed roles are the primary roles of the aircraft during World War II – many obsolete pre-war combat aircraft remained in use as trainers rather than in their original more familiar roles. Captured or acquired aircraft are listed separately as many were used only for evaluation while those available in large enough numbers were commonly used as trainers, while a small number were used in the Reich Aviation Ministry's list of aircraft at list of RLM aircraft designations and a full explanation is at RLM aircraft designation system. A small number of surviving pre-1933 aircraft were overlooked by the RLM system and just used the company names or designations.

== Luftwaffe aircraft ==
The primary types operated by the Luftwaffe are shown highlighted, with the most numerous in bold.

RLM #	Aircraft	Role	Production Status	# built/used	1st Flight	Notes
192	AGO Ao 192 Kurier	transport	production	6	1935	used by senior officials
66	Arado Ar 66	trainer	production	1,456	1932	biplane
68	Arado Ar 68	trainer/night-fighter	production	511	1934	biplane, obsolete by 1939
76	Arado Ar 76	trainer	production	189	1934	
80	Arado Ar 80	experimental	prototype	3	1935	used to test Fowler flaps
95	Arado Ar 95	training	production	27	1936	seaplane, built for export
96	**Arado Ar 96**	trainer	production	2,891	1938	
196	Arado Ar 196	reconnaissance	production	541	1937	ship-borne seaplane
197	Arado Ar 197	fighter	prototype	3	1937	carrier aircraft derived from Ar 68
198	Arado Ar 198	reconnaissance	prototype	1	1938	
199	Arado Ar 199	trainer	prototype	2	1939	seaplane
213	Arado Ar 231	reconnaissance	prototype	6	1940	folds to fit on U-boat
232	Arado Ar 232 Tausendfüßler	transport	production	20	1941	
234	Arado Ar 234 Blitz	reconnaissance/bomber	production	210	1943	Bomber Jet
240	Arado Ar 240	fighter	prototype	14	1940	
440	Arado Ar 440	fighter	prototype	4	1942	1 converted from Ar 240
349	Bachem Ba 349 Natter	interceptor	production	36	1945	rocket, only 1 manned flight attempted
40	Blohm & Voss BV 40 Ersatzjäger	interceptor	prototype	7	1944	glider
138	Blohm & Voss BV 138 Seedrache	maritime patrol	production	297	1937	diesel trimotor flying-boat
139	Blohm & Voss Ha 139	transport	prototype	3	1936	long-range seaplane
140	Blohm & Voss Ha 140	maritime patrol	prototype	3	1937	seaplane
141	Blohm & Voss BV 141	reconnaissance	prototype	28	1938	asymmetrical
142	Blohm & Voss BV 142	maritime patrol/transport	prototype	4	1938	
144	Blohm & Voss BV 144	transport	prototype	2	1944	
155	Blohm & Voss BV 155	interceptor	prototype	3	1944	built to counter B-29
222	Blohm & Voss BV 222 Wiking	transport	production	13	1940	six-engined flying-boat
238	Blohm & Voss BV 238	maritime patrol	prototype	1	1944	six-engined flying-boat, largest Axis aircraft flown
131	**Bücker Bü 131** Jungmann	trainer	production	5,000 ca.	1934	biplane, also used for night harassment
133	Bücker Bü 133 Jungmeister	trainer	production	250 ca.	1935	aerobatic biplane
180	Bücker Bü 180 Student	trainer	production	50	1937	
181	**Bücker Bü 181** Bestmann	trainer	production	3,400	1939	
182	Bücker Bü 182 Kornett	trainer	prototype	4	1938	
313	Caproni Ca.313G	trainer	production	164	1939	purchased from Italy.
38	**DFS SG 38** Schulgleiter	trainer	production	10,000 ca.	1938	glider, widely copied
228	DFS 228	reconnaissance	prototype	2	1944	rocket-powered, unpowered flights only
230	**DFS 230**	transport	production	1,600 ca.	1937	glider
331	DFS 331	transport	prototype	1	1942	glider
11	Dornier Do 11	bomber	production	372	1932	
12	Dornier Do 12 Libelle	trainer	prototype	1	1932	impressed seaplane
16	Dornier Do 16 Wal	training	production	46	1922	flying-boat, most retired by 1939
17	**Dornier Do 17** Fliegender Bleistift	bomber/night-fighter	production	2,139	1934	
18	Dornier Do 18	maritime patrol	production	170	1935	flying-boat
19	Dornier Do 19	transport	prototype	3	1936	only 1 flown, built as heavy bomber
22	Dornier Do 22	maritime patrol	production	30 ca.	1938	built for export
23	Dornier Do 23	bomber	production	282	1934	withdrawn after invasion of Poland
24	Dornier Do 24	maritime patrol	production	218	1937	flying boat, was for export
26	Dornier Do 26	reconnaissance	production	6	1938	long-range seaplane
215	Dornier Do 215 Fliegender Bleistift	bomber/night-fighter	production	105	1938	
217	Dornier Do 217 Fliegender Bleistift	bomber/night-fighter	production	1,925	1938	
317	Dornier Do 317	bomber	prototype	6	1943	Bomber B
335	Dornier Do 335 Pfeil	fighter/bomber	production	37	1943	push-pull engines
5	Fieseler Fi 5	trainer	production	29 ca.	1933	acrobatic sportsplane
103	Fieseler Fi 103R Reichenberg	manned bomb	production	175	1944	manned variant of V-1 missile
156	**Fieseler Fi 156** Storch	reconnaissance	production	2,867	1936	
167	Fieseler Fi 167	bomber	production	14	1938	ship-borne biplane
256	Fieseler Fi 256	transport	prototype	6–9	1941	
184	Flettner Fl 184	reconnaissance	prototype	1	1936	helicopter
282	Flettner Fl 282 Kolibri	reconnaissance	production	24	1941	Synchropter helicopter
223	Focke-Achgelis Fa 223 Drache	transport	production	20	1940	helicopter
330	Focke-Achgelis Fa 330	reconnaissance	production	200	1942	autogyro kite, rarely used
152	Focke-Wulf Ta 152	fighter/interceptor	production	49	1944	improved Fw 190, production curtailed
154	Focke-Wulf Ta 154 Moskito	night-fighter	production	30 ca.	1943	development curtailed
44	Focke-Wulf Fw 44 Stieglitz	trainer	production	1,700 ca.	1932	biplane, widely exported
56	Focke-Wulf Fw 56 Stösser	trainer	production	1,000 ca.	1933	parasol monoplane
58	Focke-Wulf Fw 58 Weihe	trainer	production	1,350	1935	
61	Focke-Wulf Fw 61	experimental	prototype	2	1936	twin rotor helicopter
62	Focke-Wulf Fw 62	reconnaissance	prototype	4	1937	ship-borne biplane seaplane
186	Focke-Wulf Fw 186	reconnaissance	prototype	1	1937	autogyro
187	Focke-Wulf Fw 187 Falke	fighter	prototype	9	1937	
189	Focke-Wulf Fw 189 Uhu	reconnaissance	production	864	1938	
190	**Focke-Wulf Fw 190** Würger	fighter	production	20,000 ca.	1939	many exported to client states
191	Focke-Wulf Fw 191	bomber	prototype	3	1942	Bomber B
200	**Focke-Wulf Fw 200** Condor	maritime patrol/transport	production	276	1937	originally airliner, some exported
145	Gotha Go 145	trainer	production	1,182	1934	
146	Gotha Go 146	transport	prototype	4	1936	
147	Gotha Go 147	experimental	prototype	1	1936	tailless
242	Gotha Go 242	transport	production	1,528	1941	glider
244	Gotha Go 244	transport	production	176	1941	powered Go 242, 133 converted
345	Gotha Go 345	transport	prototype	1	1944	glider
430	Gotha Ka 430	transport	prototype	12	1943	glider
46	Heinkel He 46	trainer	production	512	1931	parasol recon. Used for night harassment raids.
50	Heinkel He 50	reconnaissance/bomber	production	78	1931	biplane
51	Heinkel He 51	trainer	production	700	1933	obsolete fighter, few remained by 1939
59	Heinkel He 59	reconnaissance	production	144	1931	biplane seaplane
60	Heinkel He 60	reconnaissance	production	205	1933	ship-borne biplane seaplane
70	Heinkel He 70 Blitz	transport	production	15	1932	
72	Heinkel He 72 Kadett	trainer	production	2,000 ca.	1933	
100	Heinkel He 100	fighter	production	25	1938	also used He 113 designation
111	**Heinkel He 111**	bomber/transport	production	5,656	1935	many exported
112	Heinkel He 112	fighter	production	104	1935	
114	Heinkel He 114	reconnaissance	production	29 ca.	1936	seaplane
115	Heinkel He 115	bomber	production	138	1937	seaplane, some exported.
116	Heinkel He 116	reconnaissance	prototype	14	1937	
119	Heinkel He 119	high-speed reconnaissance	prototype	8	1937	
162	Heinkel He 162 Spatz	light jet fighter	production	320	1944	jet, Volksjäger winner
172	Heinkel He 172	trainer	prototype	1	1934	He 72 with NACA cowling
177	Heinkel He 177 Greif	heavy/strategic bomber	production	1,169	1939	engine problems until major redesign
219	Heinkel He 219 Uhu	night-fighter	production	300 ca.	1942	
280	Heinkel He 280	fighter	prototype	9	1940	jet
123	Henschel Hs 123	ground attack	production	250	1935	
125	Henschel Hs 125	trainer	prototype	2	1934	
126	Henschel Hs 126	reconnaissance	production	600 ca.	1936	
127	Henschel Hs 127	bomber	prototype	2	1937	
128	Henschel Hs 128	experimental	prototype	2	1939	high-altitude test aircraft
129	Henschel Hs 129	ground attack	production	865	1939	
130	Henschel Hs 130	bomber	prototype	13	1939	high-altitude
229	Horten Ho 229	fighter	prototype	3	1944	jet flying wing, only one flown under power
n/a	Junkers W34	trainer	production	2,024	1926	1920s transport.
52	**Junkers Ju 52** Tante Ju	transport	production	4,845	1931	Spanish Civil War bomber, widely exported
86	Junkers Ju 86	bomber/reconnaissance	production	632	1934	
87	**Junkers Ju 87** Stuka	bomber	production	6,500	1935	many exported to client states
88	**Junkers Ju 88**	bomber/night-fighter	production	15,183	1936	variants filled numerous roles
89	Junkers Ju 89	bomber	prototype	2	1937	originally Ural bomber
90	Junkers Ju 90	transport	production	18	1937	
188	Junkers Ju 188 Rächer	bomber	production	1,234	1940	
252	Junkers Ju 252	transport	production	15	1942	
287	Junkers Ju 287	bomber	prototype	2	1944	jet
288	Junkers Ju 288	bomber	prototype	22	1940	Bomber B design winner
290	Junkers Ju 290	maritime patrol/transport	production	65	1942	
322	Junkers Ju 322 Mammut	transport	prototype	2	1941	glider
352	Junkers Ju 352 Herkules	transport	production	50	1943	
388	Junkers Ju 388	reconnaissance/bomber	production	101 ca.	1943	fighter variants also planned
390	Junkers Ju 390	bomber	prototype	2	1943	Amerika Bomber
31	Klemm Kl 31	trainer	production	30	1931	
35	Klemm Kl 35	trainer	production	2,000 ca.	1935	sportplane, many exported
36	Klemm Kl 36	transport	production	12 ca.	1934	
108	Messerschmitt Bf 108 Taifun	trainer	production	885	1934	many exported
109	**Messerschmitt Bf 109**	fighter	production	33,984	1935	many exported to client states
110	**Messerschmitt Bf 110** Zerstörer	fighter	production	6,170	1936	
162	Messerschmitt Bf 162 Jaguar	bomber	prototype	3	1937	
163	Messerschmitt Bf 163	reconnaissance	prototype	1	1938	designation reused for interceptor
163	Messerschmitt Me 163 Komet	interceptor	production	370	1944	rocket
209	Messerschmitt Me 209	racer	prototype	4	1938	
209	Messerschmitt Me 209-II	fighter	prototype	4	1943	unrelated to previous Me 209
210	Messerschmitt Me 210	fighter	production	108	1939	
261	Messerschmitt Me 261 Adolfine	reconnaissance	prototype	3	1940	
262	**Messerschmitt Me 262** Schwalbe	fighter	production	1,400 ca.	1941	jet
263	Messerschmitt Me 263	interceptor	prototype	1	1944	rocket, did not fly under power
264	Messerschmitt Me 264	bomber	prototype	3	1942	Amerika Bomber
309	Messerschmitt Me 309	fighter	prototype	4	1942	
321	Messerschmitt Me 321 Gigant	transport	production	200	1941	glider
323	Messerschmitt Me 323 Gigant	transport	production	198	1942	powered variant of Me 321
328	Messerschmitt Me 328	fighter	prototype	9	1944	pulse jet
410	**Messerschmitt Me 410** Hornisse	fighter/reconnaissance	production	1,189	1942	improved Me 210
104	Siebel Fh 104 Hallore	transport	production	46	1937	
201	Siebel Si 201	reconnaissance	prototype	2	1938	
202	Siebel Si 202 Hummel	trainer	production	66	1938	sportplane
204	Siebel Si 204	trainer	production	1,216	1940	also used as transport

== Captured or acquired aircraft ==
Name	Source	Luftwaffe Role	# (if known)	Notes
Avia B-534	Czechoslovakia	trainer		Three modified for carrier trials. Some sold.
Avia B-71	Czechoslovakia	bomber	61 SB-2 + 111 B.71	Later ones manufactured as target tugs, some sold to Bulgaria
AVIA FL.3	Italy	trainer	145	Sent to flying schools in Austria.
Bloch M.B.175	France	bomber		
Bloch M.B.151	France	fighter/trainer		Vichy MB.152 also transferred to Luftwaffe In 1942.
Boeing B-17 Flying Fortress	US	special operations		Used by special units such as KG 200.
Cant Z.506	Italy	search & rescue		used from 1943 with mixed Italian/German crews.
Cant Z.1007	Italy	transport		used from 1943
Caudron C.445 Goéland	France	transport		
Curtiss H-75 Hawk	France & Norway	fighter		Used pending delivery of Bf 109's. Some sold to Finland.
Dewoitine D.520	France	trainer	182	Some sold.
Douglas 8A-3N	Netherlands	trainer	3 ca.	
Douglas DC-2	Netherlands	transport	3	ex-KLM aircraft
Fiat CR.42 Falco	Italy	ground attack /night fighter	112+	from 1943, flown by NSGr.9 and JG.107
Fiat G.50/B	Italy	trainer	unk.	from 1943, flown by 7th Nacht Schlacht Gruppe based in Croatia
Fokker C.V	Various	trainer	unk.	
Fokker C.X	Netherlands	trainer	unk.	
Fokker D.XXI	Netherlands	fighter		
Fokker T.VIII	Netherlands	maritime patrol		floatplane
Fokker G.I	Netherlands	trainer		some used in 1941 for Bf 110 crews.
Gloster Gladiator	Latvia via USSR	trainer	1	captured from Soviets, glider/target tug.
Hawker Hurricane	France, Jugoslavia & N. Africa	familiarization		Not used for combat.
Ilyushin Il-2	USSR	n/a		never used
Lioré et Olivier LeO 451	France	transport	39+	from May 1943, flown by IV./TG4.
Lockheed P-38 Lightning	USA	fighter	1	provided by defector.
Macchi MC.202	Italy	trainer	47	used from 1943. Some transferred to Croatia.
Macchi MC.205	Italy	fighter	25	used from 1944. II/JG 77
Mikoyan-Gurevich MiG-3	USSR	n/a		Tried to sell 22 to Finland
Morane-Saulnier M.S.230	France	trainer		
Morane-Saulnier M.S.406	France	trainer	46+	25 sold to Finland in 1941
Nakajima E8N	Japan	reconnaissance seaplane	1	employed on the German auxiliary cruiser Orion
North American NAA 57	France	trainer		
North American NAA 64	France	trainer		Most received in crates
PZL.37 Łoś	Poland	n/a		tested but not used
Rogožarski IK-3	Yugoslavia	fighter		
Reggiane Re.2002	Italy	fighter	25	from 1943, Reggiane ordered to build more
Savoia-Marchetti SM.79	Italy	transport		used from 1943.
Savoia-Marchetti SM.82	Italy	transport	430	used 1942–1945.
Supermarine Spitfire	United Kingdom	fighter		
Zlín Z-XII & 212	Czechoslovakia	trainer		

== See also ==
- German aircraft production during World War II
- List of aircraft of World War II
- List of German aircraft projects, 1939–45
- List of gliders
- List of jet aircraft of World War II
- List of military aircraft of Germany
- List of military aircraft of Germany by manufacturer
- List of military aircraft of Nazi Germany
- List of RLM aircraft designations
