= Dornier Do 417 =

German bomber project

Do 417

General information
- Type: Multirole bomber
- Manufacturer: Dornier Flugzeugwerke
- Status: Canceled
- Number built: 0

History
- Developed from: Dornier Do 217

The Dornier Do 417 was a twin-engine multirole combat aircraft. Developed in 1942, it resulted from the Luftwaffe's request for a medium bomber, a contest in which Dornier, Junkers, Heinkel, and Blohm & Voss competed. In the end, the Junkers Ju 188 was chosen by the Luftwaffe, and the Do 417 never entered production.

== Design and development ==
The plans for the Do 417 were first presented to the RLM on January 22, 1943 in response to the Bomber B competition. It was intended to fill both the bomber and reconnaissance roles. It was to have a stepless cockpit housing three of the four crew, and was to be fitted with Kuto-Nase cable-cutters on the nose and along the leading edge of the wing to defend against barrage balloons. Dive brakes were to be positioned over and under the wings between the engine nacelles, similar to the Do 217. The pilot's seat and tail gunner's positions were to be armored, and although unpressurized, the crew would have been able to operate at high altitude with oxygen masks. The glazed nose and the propellers would have had de-icers, and inflatable one-man dinghies would have been provided in case the aircraft ditched in the sea.

Defensive armament was originally to have consisted of an MG 151 cannon in the nose, an HD 151 turret in the dorsal position, and another HD 151 in the tail. The nose-mounted MG 151 was later changed to a small turret, and an MG 131Z machine gun was added to the underside of the nose. It would have been fitted with a Lotfernrohr 7D bombsight. The internal bomb load was limited to fifteen 50 kg bombs, but provisions were to be provided for two 2,000 kg bombs carried under the fuselage. The aircraft was originally to be powered by two Junkers Jumo 222 engines, but problems with these led them to be substituted with the Daimler-Benz DB 603A inverted V12 engines, later changed to the DB 603G model.

However, the Do 417's performance was estimated to be worse than that of the competing Junkers Ju 188, and the Do 417 was rejected so the aircraft was never built.

== Variants ==
Do 417 V1
Unbuilt first prototype, to be powered by two DB 603A-2 engines.
Do 417A
Proposed production variant to be powered by two DB 603G engines.

== Specifications (Do 417A) ==
Data from

General characteristics

- Crew: 4
- Max takeoff weight: 17,000 kg (37,479 lb) with 2,000 kg (4,400 lb) bomb load
- Fuel capacity: 2,400 kg (5,300 lb)
- Powerplant: 2 × Daimler-Benz DB 603G inverted V12 engine

Performance

- Maximum speed: 600 km/h (370 mph, 320 kn) at 8,000 m (26,000 ft)
- Cruise speed: 565 km/h (351 mph, 305 kn) at 7,500 m (24,600 ft)
- Range: 2,050 km (1,270 mi, 1,110 nmi)
- Service ceiling: 11,000 m (36,000 ft)
- Time to altitude: 4,000 m (13,000 ft) in 14 min

Armament

- 750 kg (1,650 lb) of bombs internally
- 4,000 kg (8,800 lb) of bombs externally
- 6x turret-mounted guns (2 each in nose, dorsal, and tail turrets)
- 1x MG 131Z machine gun in ventral position

== See also ==
Related development

- Dornier Do 17
- Dornier Do 215
- Dornier Do 217
- Dornier Do 317

Aircraft of comparable role, configuration, and era

- Junkers Ju 188
- Martin B-26 Marauder
- Mitsubishi Ki-67
- North American B-25 Mitchell
- Tupolev Tu-2
- Vickers Wellington

Related lists

- List of aircraft of World War II
- List of bomber aircraft
- List of military aircraft of Germany
