= Henschel Hs 130 =

German military aircraft

Hs 130
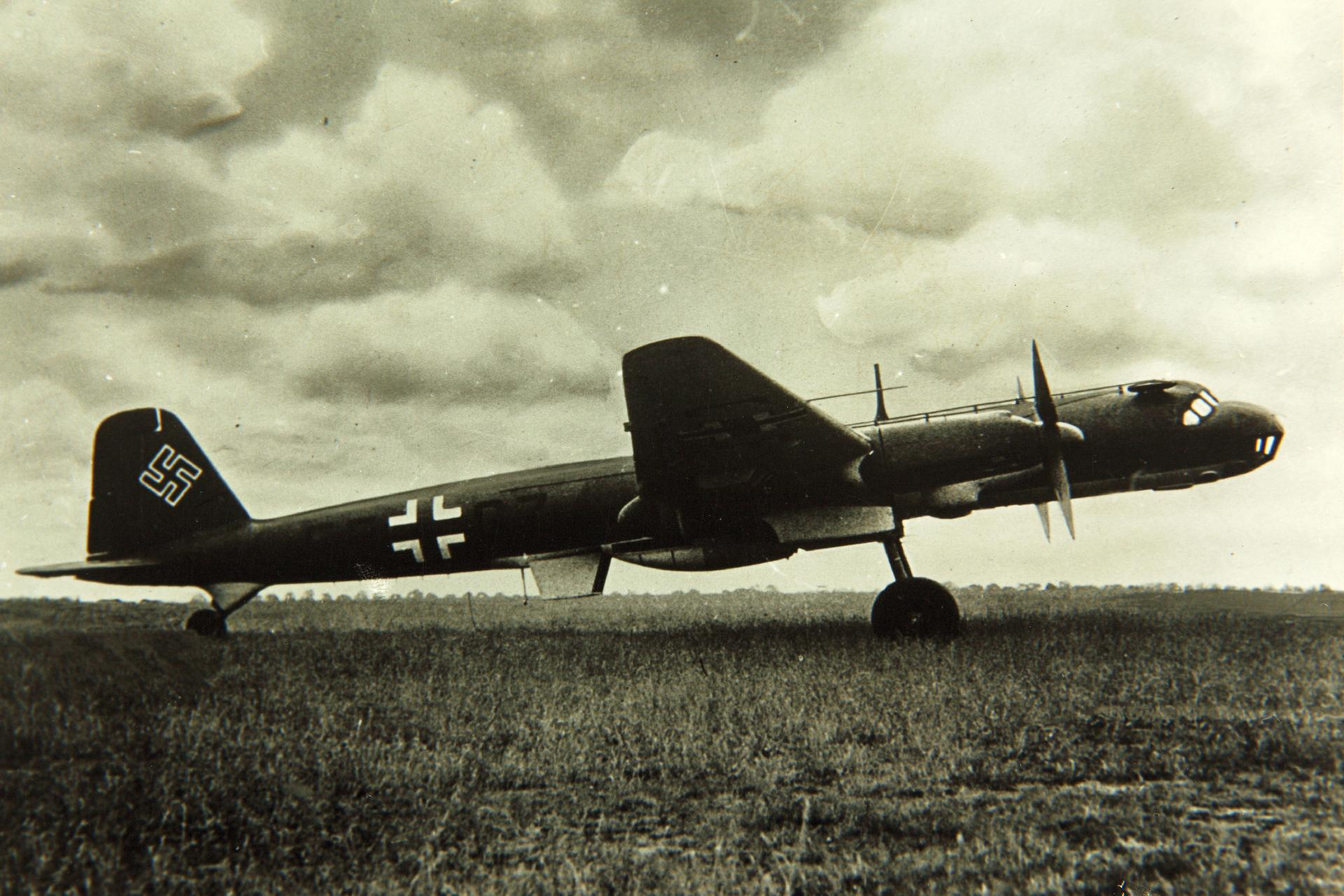
- Henschel Hs 130E prototype with HZ-Anlage fitted

General information
- Type: High altitude research/reconnaissance aircraft
- National origin: Nazi Germany
- Manufacturer: Henschel
- Status: Prototypes only
- Primary user: Luftwaffe

History
- First flight: 11 April 1939

The Henschel Hs 130 was a German high-altitude reconnaissance and bomber aircraft developed in World War II. It suffered from various mechanical faults and was never used operationally, only existing as prototype airframes.

== Development ==
Development of the Hs 130 began with two Hs 128 prototypes, which first flew on 11 April 1939, with the second prototype flying on 20 February 1940. Both prototypes were research aircraft, used for testing pressurized cabins, engine superchargers, and cantilever wings. Different engines powered the two prototypes; the V1 by Daimler-Benz DB 601s and the V2 by Junkers Jumo 210s. Both had fixed landing gear.

While trials of the two prototypes were not successful, the potential of a high altitude aircraft caught the attention of Theodor Rowehl, commander of the Luftwaffe's special reconnaissance unit. Rowehl's interest in the Hs 128's potential for high-altitude reconnaissance missions led Reich Air Ministry to instruct Henschel to continue development of the Hs 128 as a reconnaissance aircraft under the designation Hs 130A.

Three prototype aircraft Hs 130 As were built, the first flying on 23 May 1940. Five pre-production Hs 130A-0's followed, being delivered in early 1941, and featured DB 601R engines – each with a single-stage supercharger, retractable landing gear, and a bay in the rear to house two Rb75/30 cameras for reconnaissance. The five Hs 130A-0s subsequently underwent trials and testing, which revealed significant problems with the aircraft performance, and reliability problems which prevented operational use.

Two further modified Hs 130A-0s was produced under the designation Hs 130A-0/U6 and featured a greater wingspan, DB 605B engines, Hirth superchargers, GM-1 nitrous oxide power boosting, and under-wing drop tanks, and being ready for flight testing in November 1943, demonstrating an absolute ceiling of 15,500 m (50,570 ft). The Hs 130A-0/U6 variant as well as the other Hs 130A-0s proved unsatisfactory and were never flown operationally.

Further development of the Hs 130 led to bomber variants. The planned Hs 130B was almost the same as the Hs 130A, but with a bomb bay in place of the camera bay, but was never built. The Hs 130C was built as a competitor for the "Bomber B" project, and was very different from the Hs 130A, featuring a shorter wing span, remotely controlled defensive armament, a more extensively glazed (but still pressurized) cabin and up to 4,000 kg (8,800 lb) of bombs. Three prototypes, V1, V2, and V3 were built, with V1 and V2 were powered by BMW 801 radials, and V3, featuring full armament, was powered with a pair of Germany's largest displacement — at some 44.5 litres apiece — inline inverted V-12s, the Daimler-Benz DB 603A engine. The three prototypes were flown in 1942-43 to compete with the Dornier Do 317, Focke-Wulf Fw 191 and Junkers Ju 288 bombers, but production plans were abandoned. Further development of the Hs 130 as a reconnaissance aircraft continued with the Hs 130D, which was planned to have DB 605 engines and a complex two-stage supercharger, but was again unbuilt.

=== Centrally-provided supercharging experiments ===
The Hs 130E was a re-working of the Hs 130A with the Höhen Zentrale (HZ)-Anlage system in place of conventional superchargers. HZ-Anlage installed a third engine in the fuselage, a DB 605T, the only purpose of which was to power a large supercharger to supply air to the wing-mounted DB 603B engines. Such a system had first been tried some twenty-five years previously, on the R.30/16 example of the Zeppelin-Staaken R.VI bomber, with the Brown-Boveri supercharger in it powered by a Mercedes D.II engine. Another difference from the Hs 130A was the nose, which was extended forward to offset the weight of the HZ-Anlage engine in the fuselage. Also underwing fuel tanks could be fitted to provide fuel for three engines, and air scoops were fitted under the fuselage to supply the fuselage engine.

Three prototype Hs 130Es were built; Hs 130E V1 first flew in September 1942, and could reach 12,500 m (41,010 ft) when HZ-Anlage was employed. Hs 130E V2, first flown in November 1942, was lost on its seventh flight due to an engine fire; V3 was built to replace it. An order for seven pre-production Hs 130E-0s followed, first flying in May 1943, together with a production order was placed for 100 Hs 130E-1s which were to have a remotely controlled defensive armament and provisions for underwing bombs. The order was cancelled due to continuing problems suffered by the Hs 130E-0's HZ-Anlange system. An Hs 130F was planned, which was hoped to solve the problems with HZ-Anlage, by using four supercharged BMW 801 engines, but was never built.

== Specifications (Hs 130E-0) ==
Data from War Planes of the Second World War: Volume Ten

General characteristics

- Crew: 3
- Length: 22 m (72 ft 2 in)
- Wingspan: 33.01 m (108 ft 4 in)
- Height: 5.6 m (18 ft 4 in)
- Wing area: 84.9 m^{2} (914 sq ft)
- Empty weight: 12,200 kg (26,896 lb)
- Gross weight: 16,682 kg (36,778 lb)
- Max takeoff weight: 18,136 kg (39,983 lb)
- Powerplant: 2 × Daimler-Benz DB 603B inverted V-12 liquid-cooled piston engine 1,750 PS (1,730 hp; 1,290 kW)at 2,100 m (6,900 ft)
- Powerplant: 1 × Daimler-Benz DB 605T inverted V-12 liquid-cooled piston engine 1,475 PS (1,455 hp; 1,085 kW) driving the HZ-Anlange supercharger in the centre fuselage
- Propellers: 4-bladed constant-speed propellers

Performance

- Maximum speed: 610 km/h (380 mph, 330 kn) at 14,000 m (46,000 ft)
- Cruise speed: 515 km/h (320 mph, 278 kn) at 12,000 m (39,000 ft)
- Range: 2,995 km (1,861 mi, 1,617 nmi)
- Service ceiling: 15,100 m (49,500 ft)
- Wing loading: 196 kg/m^{2} (40 lb/sq ft)

== See also ==
Aircraft of comparable role, configuration, and era

- Junkers Ju 86P / Ju 86R
- Junkers Ju 388
- Messerschmitt Me 261
- North American XB-28 Dragon
- Tachikawa Ki-74
- Tachikawa Ki-77

Related lists

- List of military aircraft of Germany
