= Junkers Ju 288 =

German World War II bomber prototype

Ju 288
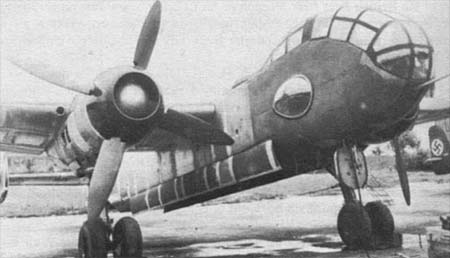
- Sole Ju 288A prototype (Ju 288V5) with Junkers Jumo 222 engines and ducted spinners

General information
- Type: Medium bomber
- National origin: Germany
- Manufacturer: Junkers
- Number built: 22

History
- First flight: 29 November 1940
- Developed from: Junkers Ju 88

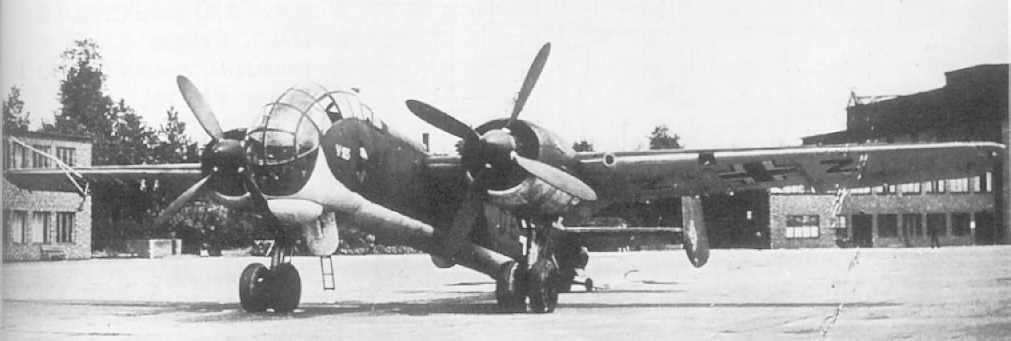
Junkers 288B (Ju 288 V13, DB 606 engines) prototype

The Junkers Ju 288, originally known within the Junkers firm as the EF 074, was a German bomber project designed during World War II, which flew only in prototype form. The first aircraft flew on 29 November 1940; 22 development aircraft were eventually produced.

The Ju 288 was the winner of the Bomber B contest, although the contest was started by the Junkers firm's submission of the EF 074 and their selection was never really in doubt. The Bomber B concept of a Schnellbomber was originally intended to replace the Junkers Ju 88. The Ju 288 offered a design that was larger, offered cabin pressurization for high altitude missions, had longer range, a much greater bomb payload, was even faster, and had improved defensive firepower. The design was intended to replace all the bombers then in Luftwaffe service.

Delivering all of these requirements in a single airframe demanded much more powerful engines; all of the Bomber B concepts, at one time or another, relied on the Junkers Jumo 222 engine to deliver this power. Ultimately, the Jumo 222 was a failure in spite of massive effort and several redesigns over a period of several years, with nearly 300 development prototypes produced. No suitable replacement was ever forthcoming, dooming the Ju 288 program, and leaving the Luftwaffe with older bomber designs during the second half of World War II.

== Design and development ==
Prior to the opening of World War II, the Luftwaffe bomber force included three major types, the Dornier Do 17 and Ju 88, both classed as schnellbomber, and the slower but somewhat larger Heinkel He 111. Although the Ju 88 outperformed the other designs in service, it however possessed adverse characteristics, including its very small internal bomb bay that forced it to carry some of its load externally, degrading performance.

Junkers had been outlining a variety of improved models of the Ju 88 since 1937, powered by the planned Jumo 222 multibank engine, or Jumo 223 inline multibank diesel of greatly increased power meant to achieve a 2,000 horsepower (1,500 kW) output level, a serious challenge for Germany's aviation engine industry of the time. The EF 074 was essentially a scaled-up Ju 88, sharing its general layout and most of its fuselage and wings with extensions in various places. The nose was redesigned with a more streamlined "stepless cockpit", having no separate windscreen panels for the pilot and co-pilot. This layout allowed cabin pressurization to be more easily implemented. This design approach had been growing in favour, subsequently appearing in various German types, notably the He 111P and -H's.

All of the defensive armament was meant to be remotely controlled comprising a remotely operated rear-facing dorsal turret at the rearmost end of the cockpit glazing, and two remotely operated "flank" turrets on the rearwards sides of the fuselage just forward of the empennage, otherwise each resembling the FDSL 131 units of the Me 210. The exclusive use of remotely operated turrets for the Ju 288's defensive firepower allowed them to be positioned more efficiently, as well as eliminating "breaks" in the fuselage pressurization.

The fuselage was expanded along its length to allow for a much longer bomb bay – somewhat as had been done with the Dornier Do 217 then in development itself – that would allow for a 3,630 kg (8,000 lb) payload to be carried internally, eliminating the need to carry ordnance on outside hardpoints.

=== Bomber B Competition ===
No serious work was undertaken on these versions, but after Heinrich Hertel left Heinkel and joined Junkers in 1939, the EF 074 design was submitted to the RLM in May 1939. Accordingly, the RLM sent out the specifications for the Bomber B design competition in July, the Ju 88 retroactively becoming the second aircraft to be designated Bomber A, as the 3 June 1936 specification for the He 177 also had that name. The Bomber B program aimed at replacing all of the medium bombers in the Luftwaffe inventory with a new design based on the EF.74 or something with equal performance. Bomber B was intended to have even better speed than the Ju 88, high-altitude cruising with a pressurized cockpit, heavier defensive armament, range allowing it to cover any point in the British Isles, and a 4,000 kg (8,820 lb) warload, double that of the earlier generation bombers. A number of companies returned proposals, but these were to some extent a formality, the EF.74 had already been selected as the winner, and of the rest of the designs submitted, only the Focke-Wulf Fw 191 and Dornier Do 317 progressed even as far as prototypes, and the Henschel Hs 130 coming under consideration as a late entrant.

Work began on building prototypes soon after, and the first example was completed by mid-1940. Power was supposed to be supplied by two 24-cylinder Jumo 222 six-bank, four cylinders per bank, over-1,500 kW output class powerplants, but problems with the Jumo 222's development – as with almost every new concept for over-1,500 kW output, reciprocating aircraft engines then underway in the Third Reich – meant the first prototypes flew with BMW 801 radial engines, instead. The first flight-quality 222s did not arrive until October 1941, and even then it was clear they were nowhere near ready for full-scale production. When it became apparent the 222 was not likely to become a viable powerplant, in May 1942, Junkers proposed replacing them, for their projected Ju 288C version, with the much heavier Daimler Benz DB 606s instead; the same 1.5 tonne, twin-crankcase "welded-together engines" that Reichsmarschall Hermann Göring complained about some three months later, regarding the He 177's own endless powerplant troubles.

=== Undercarriage difficulties ===
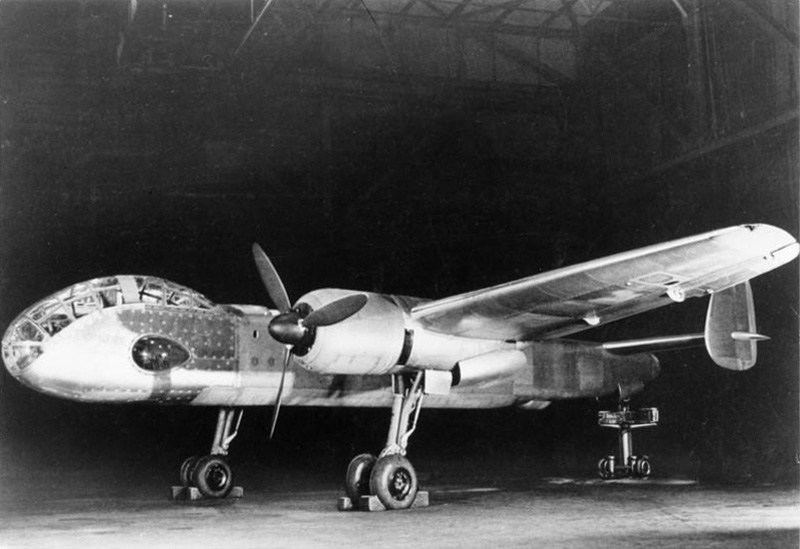
Ju 288 V1 prototype with twin BMW 801 engines. Is it being held in flying attitude by a support under the tail. The actuator rods for the landing gear's oleo struts are visible behind the main struts.

The Ju 288's intricate main landing gear system's design proved to be troublesome, possessing twin vertical members comprising the main "Y-shaped" retraction strut unit, directly behind a single oleo strut, for each pair of twinned wheels mounted through a forward-projecting lever-action arm, to the lower end of the uniquely attached main oleo strut unit. This single-tube oleo strut was pivoted off the lower end of the twin-member, "Y-shaped" retraction strut unit, and was rotated in the vertical plane about this single attachment in a rearwards direction during retraction of the main-gear unit, separate from the twin-member unit to help "shorten" its stowed length within the engine nacelle.

This distinctive type of design required the oleo strut's freely moving top end to rotate physically downwards and aftwards during the rear-swinging retraction of the main "Y-shaped" member, operated by a lever and gear-sector system mounted on the portside of each main gear assembly, operated with a long lever that had its upper end pivoted from a fixed bracket, anchored to the firewall's rear surface. The lever/sector gear system swiveled the oleo strut about its attachment point during the retract cycle, through an arc of roughly 180º from its position when the main gear was fully extended. The stowed position of the oleo strut ended up orienting it aftwards within the rear of the engine nacelle, and placing the wheels' axle location just ahead of and above the oleo strut's pivot point when fully retracted.

Such a complex main gear design, with only the single pivoting retraction point for its oleo struts taking the primary stress of touchdown, was likely only one of the many potential sources of trouble causing the Ju 288's main gear units to collapse repeatedly on touchdown.

== Operational history ==
Although the 288 never even reached production status, let alone official operational service, the aircraft did see limited combat duty. In 1944, following the cancellation of the 288 program, the surviving A and C series prototypes were hurriedly fitted with defensive armament and equipment and deployed as reconnaissance bombers on the Western Front. Very few missions were flown, owing to the scarcity of aviation fuel, spare parts and the unresolved problems with the aircraft's powerplant and undercarriage. It is believed that the 288s were attached to the same unit operating the small number of Ju 388 reconnaissance planes that saw service.

== Variants ==
- Ju 288A – first seven prototypes with BMW engines
- Ju 288B – seven prototypes with slightly enlarged airframes and better defensive armament
- Ju 288C – final eight prototypes (of which only four were completed) with two Daimler-Benz DB 606 or 610 "power system" engines. This version was selected for serial production in 1944, but the program was abandoned before this could take place.
- Ju 288D – mock-up of a Ju-288C with improved tail armament
- Ju 288G – design for an anti-ship version armed with a 355.6 mm (14 in) recoilless cannon

== Specifications (Ju 288C-1) ==
Data from Junkers aircraft and engines, 1913-1945, German aircraft of the Second World War

General characteristics

- Crew: 4 (C-2 5)
- Length: 18.15 m (59 ft 7 in)
- Wingspan: 22.657 m (74 ft 4 in)
- Height: 5 m (16 ft 5 in)
- Wing area: 64.7 m^{2} (696 sq ft)
- Empty weight: 13,400 kg (29,542 lb)
- Gross weight: 21,390 kg (47,157 lb)
- Fuel capacity: 5,360 L (1,420 US gal; 1,180 imp gal) maximum internal fuel (4,915 kg (10,836 lb))
- Powerplant: 2 × Daimler-Benz DB 610 24-cylinder coupled V-12 liquid-cooled piston engines, 2,200 kW (2,950 hp) each
- Propellers: 4-bladed constant-speed propellers

Performance

- Maximum speed: 655 km/h (407 mph, 354 kn) at 6,800 m (22,300 ft) (estimated)
- Cruise speed: 518 km/h (322 mph, 280 kn) (estimated)
- Landing speed: 150 km/h (93 mph; 81 kn) (estimated)
- Range: 2,600 km (1,600 mi, 1,400 nmi) (estimated)
- Service ceiling: 10,400 m (34,100 ft) (estimated)
- Rate of climb: 8.167 m/s (1,607.7 ft/min) (estimated)

Armament

- Guns:
  - 4 × 13 mm (0.51 in) MG 131 machine guns
  - 1 × 15 mm (0.59 in) MG 151 cannon or 20 mm (0.79 in) MG 151/20 cannon
- Bombs: 3,000 kg (6,600 lb) bomb load

== See also ==
Related development

- Ju 88
- Ju 188
- Ju 388
- Ju 488

Aircraft of comparable role, configuration, and era

- Martin XB-33 Super Marauder
- Tupolev Tu-2
- Vickers Warwick
- Yokosuka P1Y Ginga

Related lists

- List of bomber aircraft
- List of German aircraft projects, 1939–45
- List of World War II military aircraft of Germany

== Sources ==
- Hitchcock, Thomas H. Junkers 288 (Monogram Close-Up 2). Acton, MA: Monogram Aviation Publications, 1974. ISBN 0-914144-02-2.
