= Junkers Ju 488 =

Proposed bomber aircraft

Ju 488
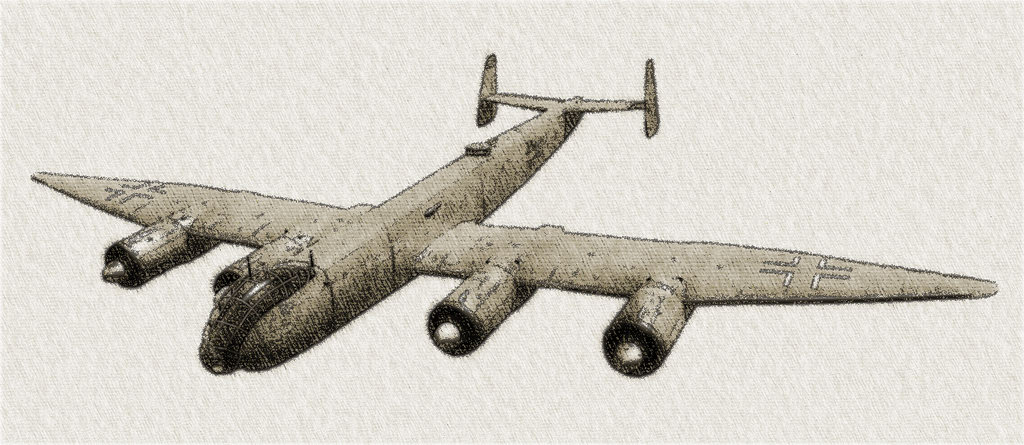
- Sketch of the Ju 488

General information
- Type: Heavy bomber
- Manufacturer: Junkers
- Primary user: Luftwaffe
- Number built: incomplete prototypes only

History
- Developed from: Junkers Ju 188; Junkers Ju 288; Junkers Ju 388

The Junkers Ju 488 was a proposed four-engined German heavy strategic bomber under development in World War II. It was based on the twin-engined Ju 188 series but with additional engines mounted on a new wing inner section. One prototype was begun but never finished.

== Design and development ==
Junkers conceived the Ju 488 in 1943 as a stopgap long-range heavy bomber until the Focke Wulf Ta 400 could enter service. Most of its design would re-use sub assemblies from the existing twin-engined '88 series, the Ju 188, Ju 288, and Ju 388 (especially its cockpit). These would be mated to new inner wing panels fitted with two more engines and an additional midsection fuselage assembly. The result would be a sleek aircraft with a length of 20.34 metres (66 ft 9 in) and a wingspan of 30.87 metres (101 ft 3 in).

A contract for ten prototypes was placed with the first, V.401, being a shell airframe having no operational equipment. The first representative prototype would be V.403.

Junkers were too busy to undertake the detailed design and manufacture themselves so they subcontracted it out across French companies Latécoère, Bréguet and SNCASE, with V.401 being built by Bréguet at Toulouse.

The airframe was based on the Ju 188, using the tail unit of the Ju 288. These were supplied by the regular manufacturers, while the new parts were made in France. The new wing inner sections were of parallel chord with near-duplicate engine and undercarriage installations to the Ju 188, creating a four-engined layout with four main undercarriage wheels. Fuel was carried in additional tanks in both the wing and 3 metres (9 ft 10 in) fuselage extensions.

The Ju 488 was expected to be powered initially by four BMW 801TJ or BMW 802 radial engines, with each engine nacelle having a standard Ju 88-style rearwards-retracting single strut main landing gear unit, rotating through 90° to lie flat (with the main wheel above the end of the strut) within each of the nacelles. For the V 403 and subsequent machines the 24-cylinder Jumo 222 liquid-cooled multibank inline engine may have been under consideration.

V 403 and subsequent machines differed in many small ways from V 401 and their design was never finalised. A defensive twin-gun tail barbette was planned and a reconnaissance version would have a shallower fuselage than the bomber.

V.401 was still unfinished when it was destroyed on the night of 16/17 July 1944, in a raid by the French Resistance. Toulouse was liberated the next month and the project ended.

== Specifications (Ju 488A-1 - estimated) ==
Data from Sharp (2016)

General characteristics

- Crew: 3
- Length: 20.34 m (66 ft 9 in)
- Wingspan: 30.87 m (101 ft 3 in)
- Fuel capacity: 4,750 L (1,250 US gal; 1,040 imp gal)
- Powerplant: 4 × BMW 801TJ or BMW 802 24-cylinder liquid-cooled 6-bank in-line radial piston engines 2,500 PS (2,500 hp; 1,800 kW)
- Propellers: 4-bladed constant-speed propellers, 4.2 m (13 ft 9 in) diameter

Performance

- Maximum speed: 591 km/h (367 mph, 319 kn) at 90% power
- Cruise speed: 423 km/h (263 mph, 229 kn)
- Combat range: 1,750 km (1,090 mi, 940 nmi)

Armament

- Guns: 2 × 20 mm MG 151 cannon in remote tail turret
- Bombs: Typically 3,000 kilograms (6,600 lb) in internal bay

== Bibliography ==
- Filly, Brian. (1991) Junkers Ju 88 in Action, part 2. Carrollton, TX: Squadron/Signal Publications, Inc. ISBN 978-0-89-747258-6
- Green, William. (1968) War Planes of the Second World War: Volume Ten: Bombers and Reconnaissance Aircraft. London: Macdonald. OCLC 1226598555
- Green, William. (1970) Warplanes of the Third Reich. London: Macdonald and Jane's. Pages 520–522. OCLC 978-0-35-602382-3
- Sharp, Dan. (2016) Luftwaffe: Secret Bombers of the Third Reich, Mortons. Pages 90−93. OCLC 978-1-91-127606-7
- Smith, J.R. and Kay, Anthony. (1972) German Aircraft of the Second World War. London: Putnam and Company, Ltd. ISBN 0-370-00024-2.
