= Sondergerät SG104 "Münchhausen" =

German experimental weapon of WWII

The Sondergerät SG104 "Münchhausen" was a German 355.6 mm (14-inch) caliber prototype recoilless rifle designed in 1939. It was intended to be mounted under the fuselage of airplanes such as the Dornier Do 217 or the Junkers Ju 288 to engage ships of the Royal Navy.

== Development ==
Based on ideas from the First World War, in 1939 the German government ordered the development of a recoilless rifle capable of engaging armored naval targets. Rheinmetall-Borsig began the development of Gerät 104 (Device 104), it was given the code name "Münchhausen" at a later time. It is believed that the absence of recoil of this type of gun allowed for installation on an aircraft.

=== Planned use ===
The Gerät 104 was planned to be mounted on airplanes for attacking naval targets in a manner as follows; upon arriving to the zone of operation, the aircraft equipped with the Gerät 104 would initiate a dive with an angle of attack between 50° and 80° from the horizontal, firing at an altitude between 6,000 and 2,000 meters. The flight time of the projectile could range from 16.0 seconds for a shot from an altitude of 6,000 meters at a 50° angle to 4.4 seconds for a shot from 2,000 meters at an 80° angle. The purpose of such a high angle of attack was likely to allow the projectile to penetrate the ship's deck, where for most warships the armor, if any, was much thinner than the armor on its sides. Prior to impact, the velocity of the projectile was projected to range between 449 and 468 m/s (1,616 to 1,674 km/h).

=== Trials ===
After calculations had verified that the designed rifle would have effectively no recoil, preliminary tests were carried out. The cannon was mounted on a carriage that was fixed to the fuselage of a Dornier Do 217 in 2 places: under the cockpit and on the fuselage behind the wings. The first test was conducted on 9 September 1940; during this test the explosive propellant used was weaker than originally planned, yet the tail of the Dornier Do 217 still experienced deformations due to the blast waves caused by the explosive backblast of the gun. These deteriorations occurred in two particular instances; the first due to a direct impact of the blast wave on the fuselage, and the second to the reflection of the blast wave from the ground. The trials continued through 1941 without reaching a solution for the fuselage damage caused by firing. Due to this issue and the decreased need for this project due to development of air-to-ground rockets, the project was definitively abandoned without any additional in-air tests being performed as the damage caused by the cannon to the aircraft was considered too critical to warrant further pursuit.

== Specifications ==
=== Gerät 104a ===
The technical data of the rifle are as follows:

- Caliber: 355.6 mm
- Muzzle velocity: 300 m/s
- Projectile mass: 700 kg
- Maximum gas pressure: 2100 kg/cm^{2}
- Average gas pressure: 1117 kg/cm^{2}
- Empty mass of rifle: 2780 kg
- Mass of cartridge: 1457 kg
- Loaded mass of rifle: 4237 kg
