= Junkers Ju 188 =

1940 bomber aircraft family

Ju 188
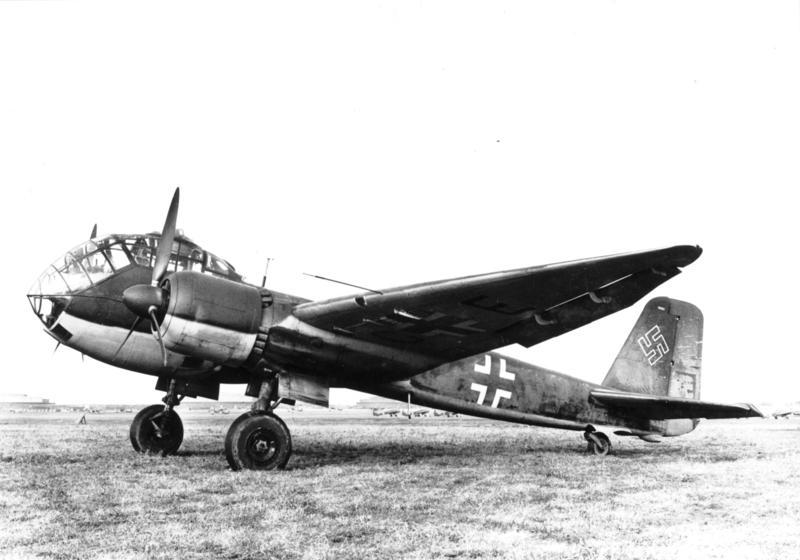

General information
- Type: Tactical bomber/reconnaissance aircraft
- Manufacturer: Junkers
- Primary users: Nazi Germany France and United Kingdom (post-war)
- Number built: over 1,000

History
- Introduction date: February 1943
- First flight: 19 June 1941 (Ju 88 V27); August 1943 (Ju 188 V1)
- Retired: 1945 (Luftwaffe); 1951 (France)
- Developed from: Junkers Ju 88
- Variant: Junkers Ju 388

The Junkers Ju 188 "Rächer" ("Avenger") was a German Luftwaffe high-performance medium bomber built during World War II, the planned follow-up to the Ju 88 with better performance and payload. More than 1,000 aircraft were built, although production of the Ju 188 was curtailed early, due to the emergence of improved versions of the Ju 88, as well as the increasingly effective Allied strategic bombing campaign against German industry, leading to an increased focus on fighter production.

== Background ==
In 1936, Junkers submitted proposals for the Ju 85 and Ju 88 into competition for the new standardized Luftwaffe high-speed tactical bomber, known as the Schnellbomber (fast bomber). The two designs were almost identical, differing only in that the Ju 85 used a twin-rudder and the Ju 88 a single fin.

At the same time, they offered modified versions of each as the Ju 85B and Ju 88B, again similar to the original designs but using an "egg shaped" stepless cockpit forward fuselage design that comprised a greenhouse-like, well-framed network of some three dozen compound-curved window panels in total. This was another example of the "bullet-nose" design philosophy that almost all new German bomber designs exhibited, from the time of the Heinkel He 111P onwards. The new nose design for the Ju 88B also tightly integrated the forward end of the undernose Bola ventral gondola defensive gun position into the newer nose design, when compared to the "added-on" Bola unit pioneered on the Ju 88 V7 prototype. This meant the Ju 88B offered somewhat lower drag and better visibility. At the time, this was considered too radical and the Ju 88A with its simpler, separately-glazed dorsal cockpit "greenhouse" framed canopy, and "beetle's eye" framed, multi-flat panel nose glazing comprising a "stepped" cockpit design from the separation of the pair of glazed units by the sheetmetal of the upper fuselage nose winning the initial Schnellbomber production contract.

The Reich Air Ministry (RLM) was already in the process of looking for the replacement for the Schnellbomber, a new design that would be faster, fly higher, and have a larger warload. This emerged as the "Bomber B" program, but this was extensively delayed due to the failure of the large 2,500 PS (1,800 kW; 2,500 hp)-class engines, like Junkers' Jumo 222, to become reliable enough for production use. Although Junkers' Ju 288 was leading the contest, there was no delivery date on the engines.

To address the immediate need, the Ju 88B project was re-submitted as a stop-gap. For this version, they used the latest short-wing Ju 88 A-1 airframe as a baseline with the Ju 88B's new stepless cockpit design, with the new Junkers Jumo 213 engine, which had recently started bench testing and was expected to deliver 1,500 PS (1,100 kW; 1,500 hp) and required a redesigned annular radiator system for engine and oil cooling.

The RLM also stipulated that the aircraft should also be able to accept the BMW 801 radial engine in a Kraftei (power-egg) unitized installation, with no modification to the engine nacelles. The RLM was not impressed with the new design, as it offered only small improvements over the Ju 88A model in service but suggested that Junkers continue with the prototype work anyway and that they consider fitting the design with the BMW 139 radial. This engine was cancelled only a few weeks later and all designs based on it moved to the newer and more powerful BMW 801.

== Prototypes, Ju 88 B-0 ==
The prototype Ju 88B V1, D-AUVS, flew for the first time with the 801A/B engines in early 1940. The fuselage and tail surfaces were identical to the Ju 88 A-1, which presented a problem: with the extra power, 1,560 PS (1,150 kW; 1,540 hp), the design could now carry considerably more load than the small bomb bay could fit. An additional external shackle was then added to each wing well outside the engines, although using the rack would seriously hamper performance.

During the summer, a pre-production run of 10 Ju 88 B-0 based on the pre-production Ju 88 A-4 airframes were delivered. The A-4 used a longer wing of 20.08 m (65.9 ft) span from new rounded wingtips for better altitude performance, when compared to the initial Ju 88A-1's shorter 18.26 m (59.9 ft) span, but attention to streamlining and new pointed wing tips, somewhat resembling those fitted to the British Spitfire Mks.VII and VIII for their own intended high-altitude flight requirements, kept drag to about what it was earlier. The airframe changes moved the center of gravity slightly, so the glazed cockpit area was made slightly longer to re-balance the aircraft, while also offering better visibility for other members of the crew.

Service tests were all successful, and the pilots generally lauded the new cockpit design. However, the RLM still remained unconvinced that the small improvement in performance over the existing A-5's and future A-4's was worth investing time in. Instead, the pre-production models were modified as long-range reconnaissance aircraft by removing the guns, bombsights, and external bomb shackles, and fitting fuel tanks into the bomb bay.

Several of the airframes were retained by Junkers for further development. One of these was fitted with the slightly updated 801L engines and a small power-operated turret on the extreme top of the cockpit mounting a 13 mm (0.512 in) MG 131 machine gun.

== Variants ==
By 1942, it was becoming clear that Junkers' candidate for the important Bomber B program, the Ju 288, was not going to be ready soon and that the Ju 88 was increasingly at the mercy of rapidly improving RAF and Soviet VVS fighters. The RLM finally decided that even the small gains in performance in the Ju 88B were worth considering and asked Junkers for an improved aircraft as the Ju 188.

The sole Ju 88 E-0 was modified with another 13 mm (0.512 in) MG 131 firing rearward just below the turret, one firing forward through the nose and twin 7.92 mm (0.312 in) MG 81Z machine guns in the integrated ventral Bola gondola firing rearward. Two other airframes had their engines and outer wings removed to act as testbeds for water ditching, as it was planned to use the Ju 188 in long overwater flights against British shipping. A second Ju 188 test airframe was built from another Ju 88 A-4, this one including a larger, more trapezoidal vertical tail surface set to provide more directional control at higher altitudes, a feature also used on future Ju 88 models, most importantly on the Ju 88G night fighters. Originally known as Ju 88 V44, this airframe was later named Ju 188 V1, "so the enemy gets the impression it's something new", said Erhard Milch.

In October 1942, the Ju 188 was chosen for production. A second prototype was delivered in January, which moved the outer bomb shackles to a position inboard of the engines. Both started testing the dive bombing system installed in the 88 A-4 in February. The RLM then asked for another change, allowing the aircraft to mount either the BMW 801 or Jumo 213 engines as a complete Kraftei or "power egg" common engine installation, that would simply be bolted on and hooked up. Concerns about the Jumo 213, now years overdue, were offset by this engine's better altitude performance, so it made sense to delay the aircraft slightly if that meant it could switch to the 213 as soon as they became available. The second Ju 188 prototype was flown in at Rechlin between September and November 1943.

=== Ju 188 A & E ===
The Ju 188 was designed to be fitted with either the 1,750 PS (1,290 kW; 1,730 hp) Jumo 213A or 1,700 PS (1,250 kW; 1,680 hp) BMW 801 G-2 engines without any changes to the airframe, with the exclusion of the re-design for Jumo-powered examples, of the annular radiators from their Jumo 211 layout for the A-series to better match the more powerful 213's cooling needs, while using similar broad-chord three-blade propellers as the A-series did. It was intended that both would be known as A models but the naming was later changed: the Ju 188A model powered by the 213 and the Ju 188E by the 801.

The first three production Ju 188 E-1 machines were delivered with BMW engines in February 1943, followed by another seven in March and eight in April. A conversion testing unit was formed up in May and after testing were attached to an operational unit, with the first mission, an attack by three Ju 188E-1s on a factory in Lincoln, Lincolnshire taking place on 18 August 1943. By the end of the year, 283 Ju 188s had been delivered (including Ju 188Fs) and two new factories were added to the production effort. Most operational machines differed from the prototypes only in having a 20 mm (0.787 in) MG 151/20 cannon in the nose and dorsal turrets in place of the 13 mm (0.512 in) MG 131. The MG 131 was intended to be used in the Ju 188 E-1 or the G-2 but the heavy armament in the A and E series was the MG 151/20. The Ju 188 E-2 was built as a torpedo-bomber but was identical to the Ju 188 A-3.

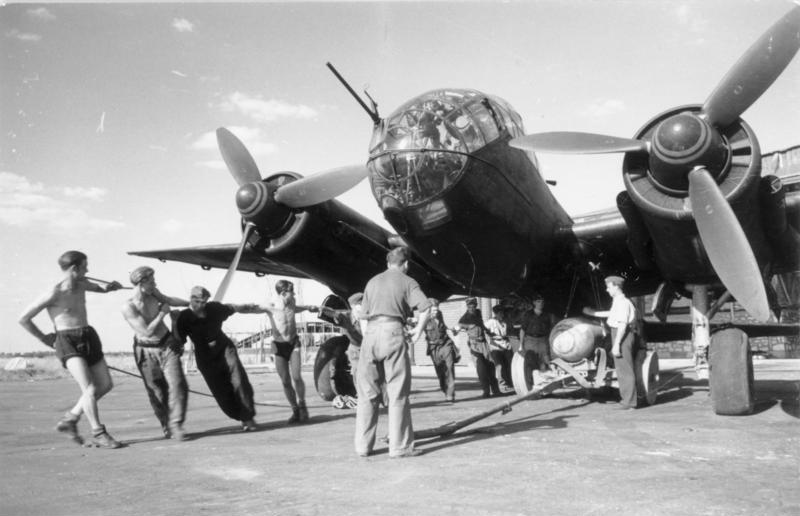
A Ju 188A-3 of Kampfgeschwader 6 being loaded with bombs. Western Europe, 1944 – note differing radiator core layout compared to that on the Ju 88A

Although the A and E models were to have been delivered at the same time, the Jumo engine was still not ready; the first Jumo powered Ju 188 A-1 versions were shipped only shortly after the BMW versions, albeit at a much slower rate. By the time deliveries were finally picking up in late 1943, the Jumo was available in a new MW 50 methanol-water injection "boosted" version that delivered 1,648 kW (2,241 PS; 2,210 hp) for takeoff. With this engine, the planes were known as the Ju 188 A-2 and started deliveries in early 1944.

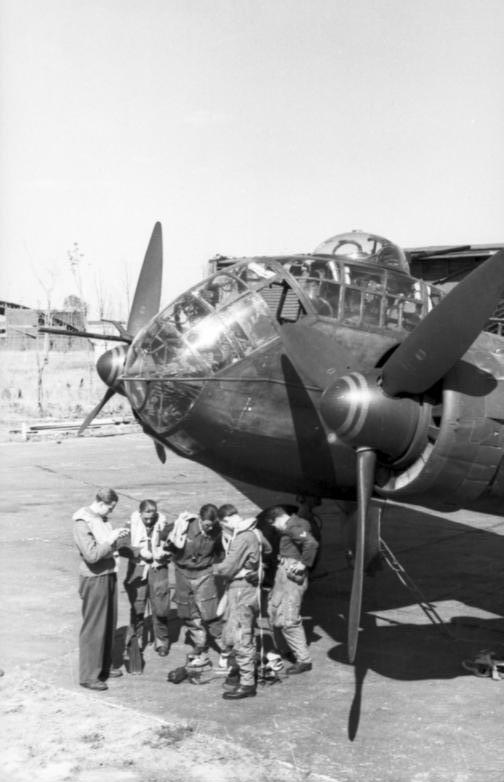
A view of the port side of the same machine, with Hohentwiel UHF radar aerials

A modified version mounting a small, low-UHF-band FuG 200 Hohentwiel sea-search radar set under the nose and shackles for a torpedo for naval strike missions was delivered as the Ju 188 E-2, and with the Jumo as the Ju 188 A-3. The only other difference was the removal of the outer pair of wing bomb shackles. For all its good points, the Ju 188 was only a small improvement over the Ju 88. The bombload and bomb bay was no larger than the earlier aircraft; although a larger load could be carried externally, it reduced performance. Even then the performance was rather poor considering all the effort – only 523 km/h (325 mph) or less. The dorsal turret had only one gun, yet the type retained the single-gun flexible position only a few centimeters away from it; various projects finally to provide the 188 with tail armament were abandoned.

Delivery problems of the Jumo 213 were never entirely solved and the only model to be built in large numbers were the E series with the BMW 801. Even then so few were available that they were generally given out to Ju 88 units, who flew them on "special" missions where the longer range or better performance would be helpful. Some 500 Ju 188A and E variants were produced before production ceased in the summer of 1944.

=== Ju 188 C ===
It was planned all along to skip over a "B model" to avoid confusion with the original Ju 88 B but in the original plan the A and E models would be called As and the Ju 188 C would be the next model. The C series was built to the extent of a single example, by modifying one of the few A-1 machines. A new power-operated, remotely operated FA 15 turret was mounted in the tail and had two 13 mm (0.512 in) MG 131s, aimed with a double-periscope (top and bottom) system mounted in the cockpit. This modification would have greatly improved defensive firepower, always lacking on German designs but reliability was so poor it was decided to abandon the system.

=== Ju 188 D & F ===
In early 1944, it was decided to focus on reconnaissance versions of the A and E models. The airframe was modified with the removal of the bomb aimer and forward gun and additional fuel cells were added to extend the range to 3,400 km (2,100 mi). The Ju 188 D-1 was otherwise similar to the A-1 and the Ju 188 D-2 had nose radar for naval reconnaissance. Similar conversions of the E models were the Ju 188 F-1 and Ju 188 F-2.

=== Ju 188 G & H ===
One problem with the Ju 88 that carried into the 188 was the lack of internal room for bomb storage. Both carried the majority of their bombload on racks under the wing, where it greatly affected performance. This was to have been addressed in the G and H models, which extended the fuselage downward for more room with the addition of a wooden pannier. The modification also left enough room at the tail to fit a manned turret in place of the C model's remote-control one but this system proved to be just as limited as the remote-control FA 15. It was so small that only the smallest men could fit into it and left them with no room to escape in an emergency. The RLM rejected the manned turret and planned on mounting the FA 15 even if it were unreliable. Oddly, the designs still possessed the Bola undernose feature for a rear-facing gunner, when this would no longer be needed and its removal would have greatly streamlined the aircraft. With the Jumo 213s now being sent to fighter production, the Ju 188G-2 was to use the BMW 801 only, with the reconnaissance conversion known as the Ju 188 H-2. Neither entered production before the war ended; the Ju 188G remained at the prototype stage. Tail empennages of the few Ju 188G prototypes built were used in construction of the first two Ju 287 prototypes.

=== Ju 188 R ===
In the summer of 1944, three E models were modified as night fighters with the addition of radar and either four 20 mm MG 151/20s or two 30 mm (1.18 in) MK 103 cannons in the nose. The better visibility of the 188 was not useful in night fighting and because the added drag of the radar washed out any speed difference, the Ju 188 R-0 was not ordered.

=== High-altitude variants ===
In 1943, it was planned to upgrade all versions with even more wing area and a pressurized cockpit for high-altitude work. A single basic airframe would be offered in three versions, the Ju 188J heavy fighter, Ju 188K bomber, and the Ju 188L reconnaissance version. As with the streamlined Ju 88S, all three late model Ju 188 designs did away with the Bola gondola, leading to a cleaner nose profile, and the bomber and reconnaissance versions mounted their loads in a long pannier under the central fuselage instead of the deeper fuselage of the G and H models.

Simpler versions of these with no defensive armament and even longer wings became the Ju 188S fighter and Ju 188T intruder. With Jumo 213E-1 engines 2,050 PS (1,510 kW; 2,020 hp) at take-off and 1,690 PS (1,240 kW; 1,670 hp) at 9,500 m (31,200 ft), the Ju 188T could reach 700 km/h (430 mph). Operating at this altitude, the Ju 188S could carry only 800 kg (1,800 lb) of bombs.

Before any of these could start production, the entire lineup was renamed the Ju 388, the vastly improved performance warranting a different 8-388 airframe number from the RLM for the design.

== Operators ==
France

- French Air Force (Postwar)
- Aviation Navale operated several captured Ju 188s post war.

Germany

- Luftwaffe

United Kingdom

- Royal Air Force operated at least two captured machines post war, an A-2 and A-3 (Wrk Nr 190335 of 9./KG 26). The A-3 surrendered to British forces after landing at Fraserburgh on 2 May 1945.

== Specifications (Ju 188E-1) ==

Data from The warplanes of the Third Reich.

General characteristics

- Crew: 4
- Length: 14.95 m (49 ft 0.5 in)
- Wingspan: 22.00 m (72 ft 2 in)
- Height: 4.45 m (14 ft 7 in)
- Wing area: 56.0 m^{2} (602.7 sq ft)
- Empty weight: 9,990 kg (22,024 lb)
- Max takeoff weight: 15,195 kg (33,499 lb)
- Powerplant: 2 × BMW 801D-2 14-cylinder air-cooled radial piston engines, 1,300 kW (1,700 hp) each for take-off

1,070 kW (1,440 hp) at 5,700 m (18,700 ft)

- Propellers: 3-bladed constant-speed propellers

Performance

- Maximum speed: 500 km/h (310 mph, 270 kn) at 6,000 m (19,685 ft)
- Cruise speed: 375 km/h (233 mph, 202 kn) at 5,000 m (16,400 ft)
- Service ceiling: 9,350 m (30,665 ft) with 2,000 kg (4,400 lb)
- Time to altitude: 6,100 m (20,000 ft) in 17 minutes 42 seconds
- Wing loading: 258.9 kg/m^{2} (53.0 lb/sq ft)
- Power/mass: 0.175 kW/kg (0.106 hp/lb)

Armament

- Guns: 1 × 20 mm (0.787 in) MG 151/20 cannon
- 3 × 13 mm (0.512 in) MG 131 machine guns
- Bombs: 3,000 kg (6,600 lb)

== See also ==
Related development

- Junkers Ju 88
- Junkers Ju 388

Aircraft of comparable role, configuration, and era

- de Havilland Mosquito
- Yokosuka P1Y Ginga

Related lists

- List of military aircraft of Germany
