= Schnellbomber =

Fast bomber aircraft that relies on speed for defense

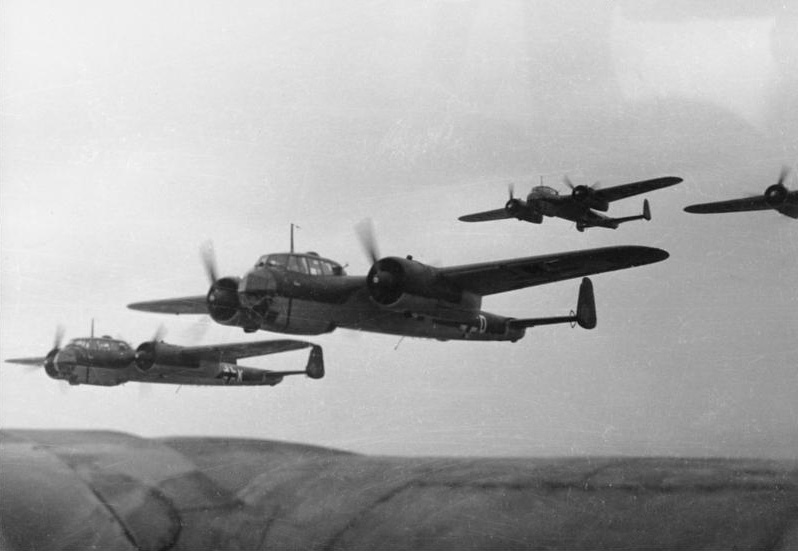
A formation of Dornier Do 17Zs, circa 1940, when the type had become heavier and less speedy than the initial Do 17 design

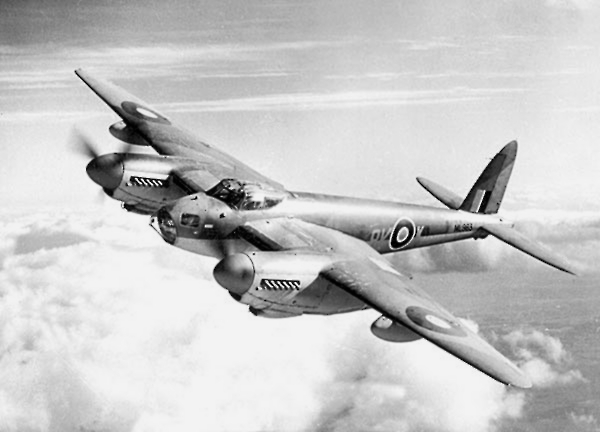
The British de Havilland Mosquito could be considered the most effective Schnellbomber of the Second World War

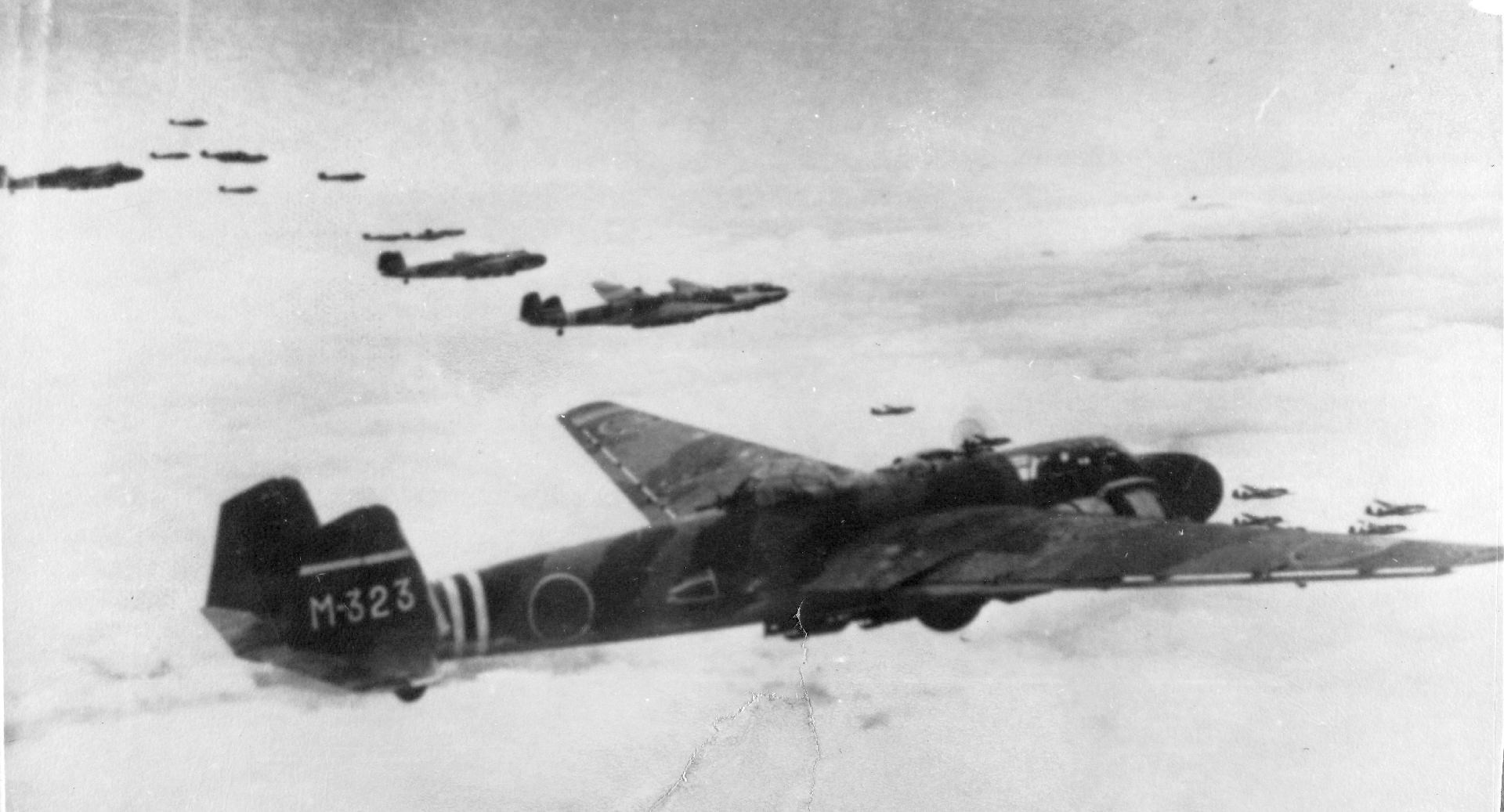
IJNAF Type 96 Model 22 (九六式二二型) were used in the schnellbomber role during the Battle of Chongqing-Chengdu

A Schnellbomber (German; literally "fast bomber") is a bomber that relies upon speed to avoid enemy fighters, rather than relying on defensive armament and armor.

== Concept ==
The concept developed in the 1930s when it was believed that a very fast bomber could simply outrun its enemies. Omitting defensive armament allowed for significant reductions in drag (there would be no turrets, gondolas or gun barrels protruding from the fuselage) and weight (no guns, ammunition or manning crew members would be required on board) and resulted in improved performance.

Adolf Hitler was a staunch supporter of the Schnellbomber and directed the Luftwaffe to develop only medium bombers, but the Americans and the British developed both twin-engine medium bombers and four-engine heavy bombers. Twin-engine medium bombers, while best adapted as the Schnellbomber, lacked the payload and range of heavy bombers, which put them at considerable disadvantage for strategic bombing. In strategic bombing raids the Luftwaffe resorted to medium bombers with limited fighter escort from the Messerschmitt Bf 109 and its heavier twin-engine Bf 110 counterpart because of the lack of a truly long-range fighter. The Allies by contrast used slow but heavily armed bombers such as the B-17 Flying Fortress deployed in combat box formation, with the long-range North American P-51 Mustang initially in escort and later in forward role conducting a "fighter sweep" to intercept attacking German fighters.

== Development ==
The first aircraft adopted for the Schnellbomber role was the single-engine Heinkel He 70, but it soon was replaced by the twin-engine Dornier Do 17 in that role. In the 1937 air races in Switzerland the Do 17 won a number of speed records, apparently demonstrating the value of the concept. However, experience of the Spanish Civil War demonstrated that the Do 17's speed when loaded with military equipment was insufficient to escape interception, and armament had to be added to give it some defensive fighting capability.

Bomber development temporarily outpaced fighter development in the 1930s. The last generation of biplane fighters (like the Gloster Gladiator and Polikarpov I-15) that had been placed in service during that decade could not catch the privately created Bristol Type 142 twin-engined light bomber prototype in 1935. However by the end of the 1930s, low-wing monoplane fighters like the Hawker Hurricane and the Supermarine Spitfire had entered service, and they had the performance to catch up with the Schnellbomber, and dramatically outgun it by eight to one (only one gun would normally be able to fire back). The Do 17 suffered badly at the hands of the RAF during the Battle of Britain, and its production run ended in 1940.

=== Japan's air war in China ===
As World War II broke out in Asia with the Battle of Shanghai and Battle of Nanjing, the Imperial Japanese Navy deployed dozens of unescorted Mitsubishi G3M bombers in the schnellbomber strategy of Giulio Douhet's total war concept of attacks against Chinese Air Force assets as well as civilian targets. However, the strategy initially backfired, as the Japanese underestimated the effectiveness of the Chinese air raid early-warning net and the numbers of experienced Chinese pilots leading their squadrons of Curtiss Hawk III (max-speed marginally slower than G3M) and Boeing P-26 Model 281 (max-speed marginally faster than G3M) fighters in a bloody rout against the Japanese bombers. Nonetheless, the total war strategy with the schnellbomber was eventually effective for the Japanese, as the Chinese lost many of their top fighter pilots by the fall of Nanking at the end of 1937. With the ever-growing Japanese blockade of war materials and high-octane aviation fuel, particularly following the capture of Nanning in the Battle of South Guangxi, and the increasing obsolescence of Chinese fighter aircraft burning low-grade fuel versus fast and high-flying massed bomber formations burning high-octane avgas, the Japanese continued to wreak havoc and devastation against Chinese cities for years to come, particularly in the Battle of Chongqing and Chengdu beginning in May 1939.

=== Germany's quest for "fast bombers" ===
The Germans nevertheless persisted in their attempts to create newer Schnellbombers, as opposed to large bombers with heavy defensive armaments which were favored by the RAF and USAAF. Other aircraft recognized as Schnellbombers by the Luftwaffe were the Junkers Ju 88, the first to be custom-designed for the role, three years before the start of the war, the Messerschmitt Me 410 Hornisse in 1943, and the jet-engined Arado Ar 234 Blitz (dubbed "the fastest bomber" – "Schnellstbomber").

Several other Luftwaffe aircraft were originally designed as fast bombers, but entered service in other roles; these include the Heinkel He 219 as a night fighter, and the Dornier Do 335 — meant to have a small, ventral weapons bay to accommodate droppable ordnance from the start — as a new Zerstörer heavy fighter, faster than any other piston-twin of World War II with a top speed of some 765 km/h (475 mph). The Bomber B high-speed medium bomber design competition for the Luftwaffe started in July 1939 was meant to create an updated design to take over the original Schnellbomber role by later in World War II, and function with a heavier bombload than the earlier Schnellbomber designs were capable of carrying, but due to the intractable development problems plaguing them, the continued unavailability of the needed pair of high power output engines of 1,500 kW (2,000 hp) and above each - primarily the complex, 24-cylinder multibank Junkers Jumo 222 - needed for such designs, no production aircraft were ever ordered under the Bomber B program.

== de Havilland Mosquito ==
The most successful Schnellbomber of the war was the bomber version of the British de Havilland Mosquito. It retained a speed advantage over its enemies for much of the war and could be effectively countered only by specialist versions of various night fighter designs, with the pioneering Me 262A jet fighter being a true potential threat in 1944. The Mosquito ended the war with the lowest loss rate among any aircraft in RAF Bomber Command. The Germans considered the Mosquito as a superior implementation of their own Schnellbomber concept and as a potential inspiration for Focke-Wulf's own all-wood twin-engined, high-speed fighter design, the Focke-Wulf Ta 154 being given the name Moskito.

== See also ==
- Bomber B - 1939 design competition, meant to replace all bombers in Luftwaffe service
- Fighter-bomber
- Light bomber
