= Bomber B =

Failed 1939-1943 Luftwaffe medium bomber program

Bomber B project
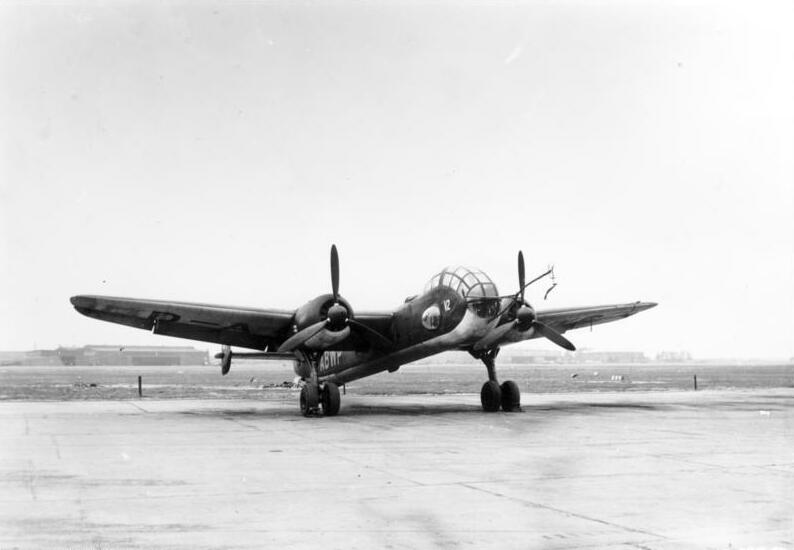
- The Junkers Ju 288 V2 (Second prototype Ju 288)

General information
- Project for: Second-generation high-speed bomber
- Issued by: Reich Air Ministry
- Service: Luftwaffe
- Proposals: Arado, Dornier, Focke-Wulf, Junkers and Henschel
- Prototypes: Dornier Do 317; Focke-Wulf Fw 191; Henschel Hs 130; Junkers Ju 288

History
- Predecessors: Schnellbomber

Bomber B was a German military aircraft design competition organised just before the start of World War II intended to develop a second-generation high-speed bomber for the Luftwaffe. The new designs would be a direct successor to the Schnellbomber philosophy of the Dornier Do 17 and Junkers Ju 88, relying on high speed as its primary defence. Bomber B would be a much larger and more capable aircraft, with range and payload far greater than the Schnellbomber, surpassing the largest conventional designs then under consideration. The winning design was intended to form the backbone of the Luftwaffe's bomber force, replacing the wide collection of semi-specialized designs then in service. The Reich Air Ministry was so optimistic that more modest projects were generally cancelled; when the project failed the Luftwaffe was left with hopelessly outdated aircraft.

== Background ==
By the late 1930s airframe construction techniques had progressed to the point where airframes could be built to any required size, founded on the all-metal airframe design technologies pioneered by Hugo Junkers with the Junkers J 1 in 1915 and improved over the two following decades – especially in Germany with aircraft like the Dornier Do X flying boat and the Junkers G 38 airliner, and the Soviet Union with the enormous Maksim Gorki, the largest aircraft built anywhere in the 1930s.

Engines for such designs were a limiting factor.

In Germany, most bomber designs in service were adapted from pre-war designs, many of them passenger aircraft or dual-use designs. The first specialist bomber aircraft was the Junkers Ju 88, which had limited range and payload, forcing the Luftwaffe to use the Heinkel He 111 for other missions. A shortage of both types forced the early-war Luftwaffe to improvise with an assortment of aircraft. The Luftwaffe was displeased with this situation.

In the early 1930s Luftwaffe Chief of Staff Walther Wever initiated the Ural bomber program for the design a long-range bomber capable of bombing factories in the Ural Mountain area from bases far to the west. Limited engine power led to very large designs with limited performance and neither of the designs, the Dornier Do 19 and Junkers Ju 89, were put into production. Wever's death on June 3, 1936, prompted the RLM to release the "Bomber A" heavy bomber design specification the same day, looking for a new heavy bomber with improved range and greater payload than the Ural Bomber prototypes. The winning design, given its RLM airframe number on November 5, 1937, was the Heinkel He 177.

The Bomber A program was still in the process of selecting the winning design when the first German large capacity engines began testing. Compared to the Jumo 211s in the Ju 88, a pair of such engines would more than double available power, upwards to 3,700 kW (5,000 hp). With this power, a significantly more capable design could be built, one with considerably larger internal space for a much larger bomb load, more fuel for longer range and greater speed. Junkers had been studying dramatically more capable versions of the Ju 88 powered by their relatively compact Jumo 222 or the four-crankshaft Jumo 223 diesel engine design from late 1937. No serious work was undertaken, but after Heinrich Hertel left Heinkel and joined Junkers in 1939, the EF 74 design was submitted to the RLM in May 1939.

Apparently excited by the possibilities of an aircraft with the payload and range of the He 177 combined with higher performance than the Ju 88, the RLM promulgated the specifications for "Bomber B" in July 1939. The specification called for a new medium bomber with a maximum speed of 600 km/h (370 mph), able to carry a bomb load of 4,000 kg (8,800 lb) to any part of Britain from bases in France or Norway. To improve crew performance and defensive firepower, the designs were to have a pressurized cabin with remotely aimed armament. As it was meant to have the desirable combination of extended range, larger payload and better performance, whatever design won the Bomber B competition would replace all bombers in service.

== Large twins ==
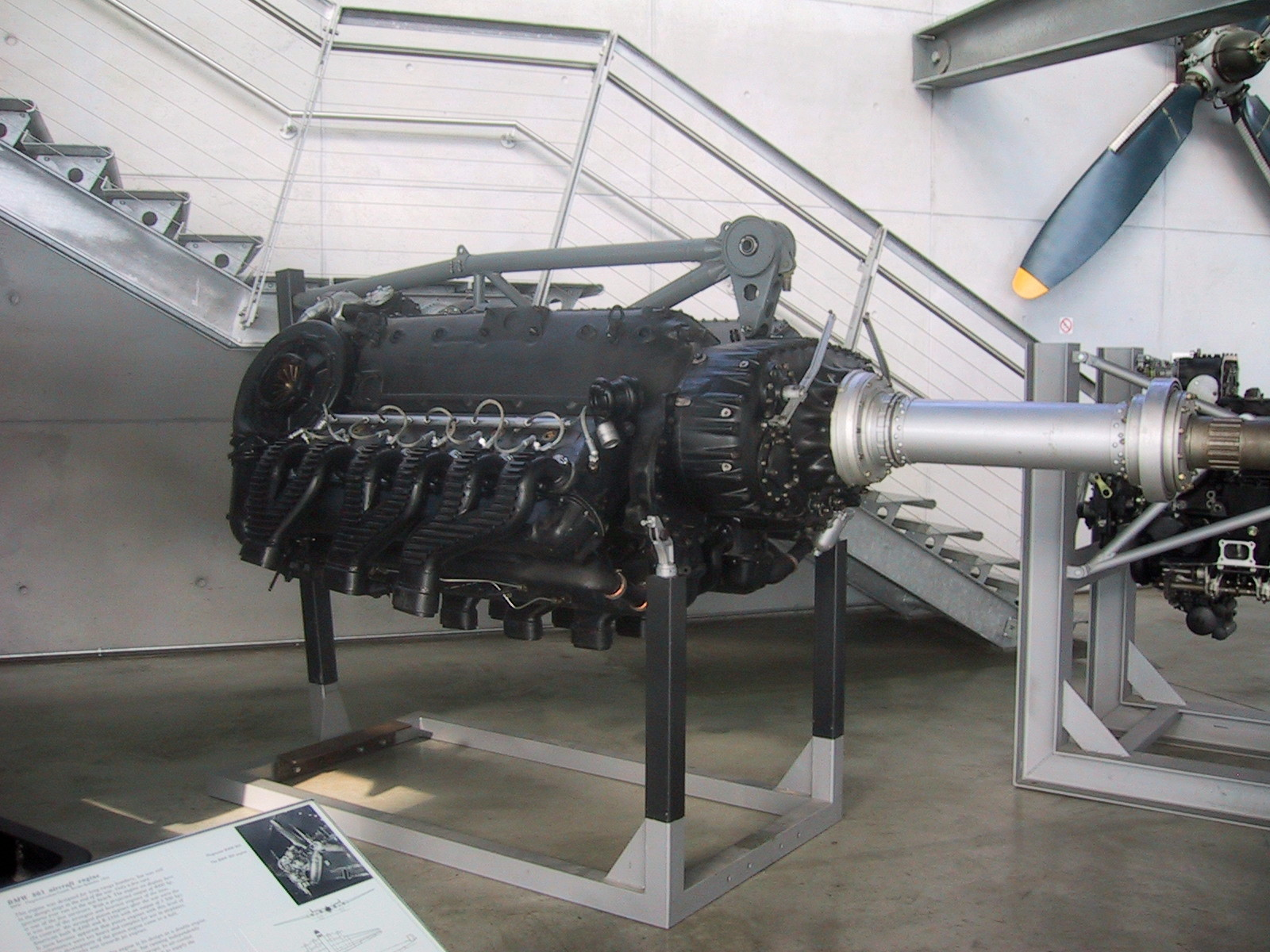
The troublesome DB 610 "welded-together engine" – the DB 606A/B powerplants were similar in configuration, with DB 610s used to substitute for the failed Jumo 222 powerplants. Outer engine mount forgings not present on this restored example.

With engines in the 1,500 to 1,900 kW (2,000 to 2,500 hp) range, twin-engined aircraft would have considerably more surplus power, allowing for much greater payloads. In theory, the more powerful engine would take no longer to produce than a 750 kW (1,000 hp) design, it would simply be larger. By the late 1930s, engines of this sort of power began to be seriously considered and the British and Germans drew up bomber designs based on them.

In the UK, Avro and Handley Page drew up proposals for a large bomber based on two Rolls-Royce Vulture engines. The Vulture had four six-cylinder cylinder blocks connected to a common crankcase and crankshaft, to make a larger displacement X-block design. As the projects matured, problems with the Vulture became evident. Contrary to hopes, bringing together two V-12 engines' onto one crankcase led to many problems. Development of the Avro Manchester continued but Handley Page was asked to adapt their HP.56 design for four smaller engines. When the Manchester flew with all of the problems with the Vulture remaining, it too received a four-engine revision by its designer, Roy Chadwick. The Avro Lancaster and Handley Page Halifax designs formed the backbone of RAF Bomber Command for the remainder of the war.

In Germany, the Bomber A program in mid-1936 had led to the Heinkel He 177 A, powered by two Daimler-Benz DB 606 "power system" engines. The 606 was a late-1930s attempt to use two Daimler-Benz DB 601 powerplants driving a common gear reduction case, resulting in a 24-cylinder powerplant like the Vulture but using two crankcases for the Heinkel He 119 high-speed reconnaissance design and the Messerschmitt Me 261 long range aircraft. The pair of DB 601 component engines were arranged in an inverted W-block layout, keeping each component engine as a separate engine as far as possible. As with the Vulture, Daimler Benz engineers found the DB 606, weighing in at a massive 1.5 tonnes (3,300 lb) apiece was mediocre, particularly when the airframe mounting them possessed an engine accommodation design that prevented adequate maintenance access and ventilation.

Production of the He 177A continued and in service with deficient powerplant installation, engine nacelle internal design and maintenance access, it was plagued by engine failures, overheating and fires while airborne, earning it the nickname "Flaming Coffin" by its crews.

== High-output engines ==
Simultaneously with the early development of the "coupled" engines, Daimler-Benz began work on a 1,500 kW (2,000 hp) class design using a single crankcase. The result was the twenty-four cylinder Daimler-Benz DB 604, with four banks of six cylinders each. Possessing essentially the same displacement of 46.5 litres (2,840 in^{3}) as the initial version of the Junkers Jumo 222, its protracted development was diverting valuable German aviation powerplant research resources, and with more development of the DB 610 coupled engine giving improved results at the time, the Reich Air Ministry stopped all work on the DB 604 in September 1942.

BMW worked on what was essentially an enlarged version of its highly successful BMW 801 design from the Focke-Wulf Fw 190. This led to the 53.7-litre (3,280 in^{3}) displacement BMW 802 in 1943, an eighteen-cylinder air-cooled radial, and the even larger, 83.5-litre (5,100 in^{3}) displacement BMW 803 28-cylinder liquid-cooled radial. As both the 802 and 803 proved to be dismal failures in testing, their development only went so far as to prioritize the 802 for "completion and prototype construction as a secondary issue", while the 803 only received attention to "its design and development". This state of affairs at BMW led to the company's engineering staff being redirected to place all efforts on improving the 801 to develop it to its full potential. Only the BMW 801F radial development, through its use of features coming from the 801E subtype, was able to substantially exceed the over-1,500 kW (2,000 hp) output level — the F-version was tested at a top output level of some 1,765 kW (2,367 hp) of take-off power.

The Junkers company's 24-cylinder Junkers Jumo 222, liquid cooled six-bank inline engine, with four cylinders in each bank, came the closest to being the only production, single-crankcase design high-output powerplant candidate during the war years, intended to power not only the Junkers Ju 288, but also many other German multi-engined advanced combat aircraft projects. The 222 was a remarkably compact and efficient engine design, being almost identical in cylinder number, displacement and weight to the British Napier Sabre H-type four-bank sleeve valved inline engine, and the best attempt at creating a German aviation engine that could routinely exceed 1,500 kW output at altitude, but as with the BMW designs and even the later Heinkel HeS 011 advanced turbojet engine, never approached being a production-ready aircraft powerplant, with just under 300 examples of the Jumo 222 produced between several different versions.

== Designs ==
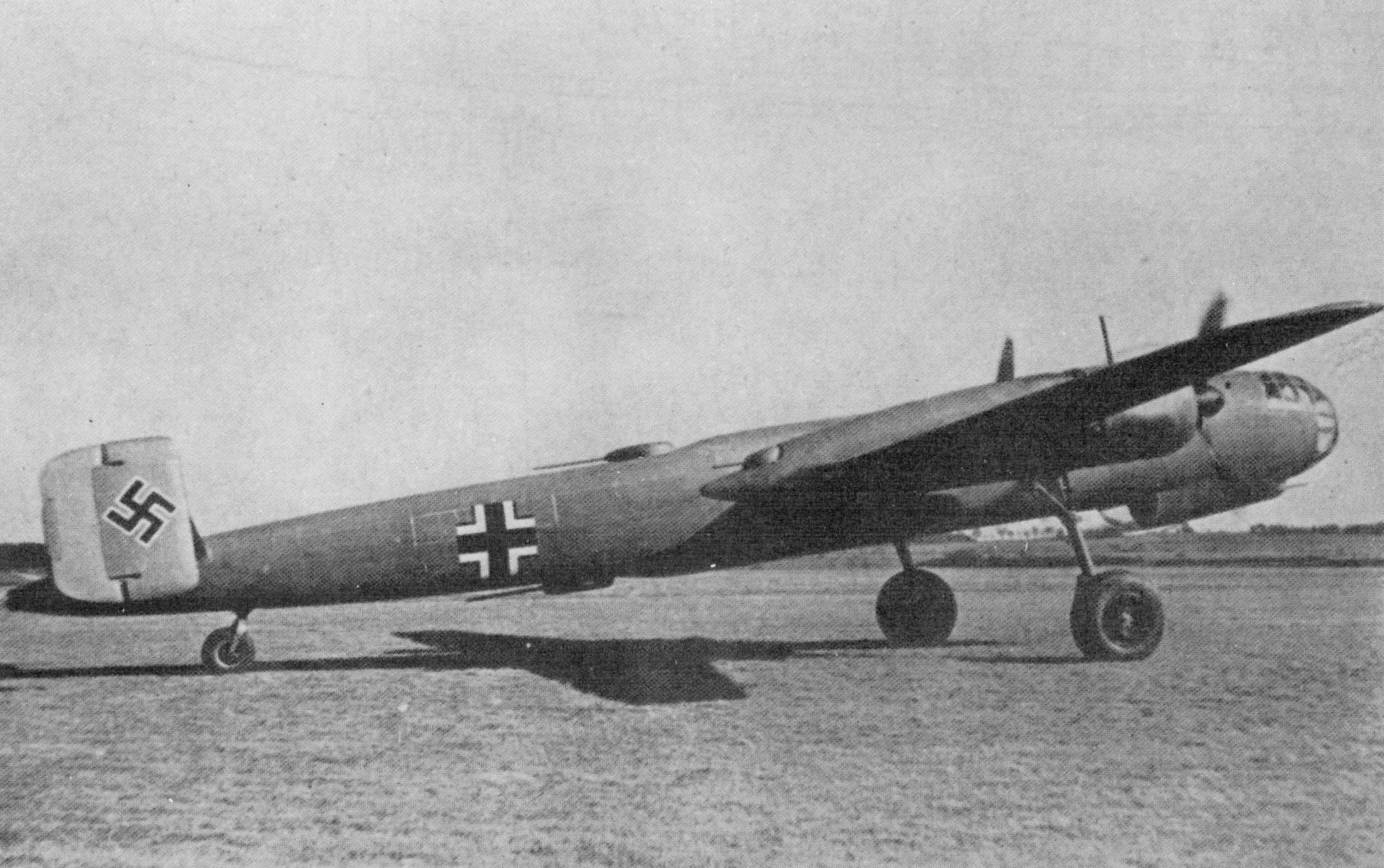
Focke-Wulf Fw 191A

Arado, Dornier, Focke-Wulf and Junkers all responded with designs and Henschel later added the Hs 130. It was clear even at this point that the call for designs was to some extent a formality, as the Junkers design had already been selected for production. The Ar 340 was dropped in the design stage and Do 317 was relegated to low-priority development, while prototype orders were placed for the Fw 191 and the Ju 288. With the Focke-Wulf and Dornier projects as first and second backups, the Technisches-Amt technical development office of the RLM started using these other designs as experimental testbeds. The Fw 191 was based around an all-electric platform to power nearly all its flight accessories, in place of hydraulics. The Fw 191 thus earned the nickname of Das Fliegende Kraftwerk (the flying power station). This dramatically increased the complexity of wiring the planes and the chance that one of the many motors would fail was considerable but that was not considered terribly important—it was felt that the Junkers design would work anyway.

== The end of the project ==
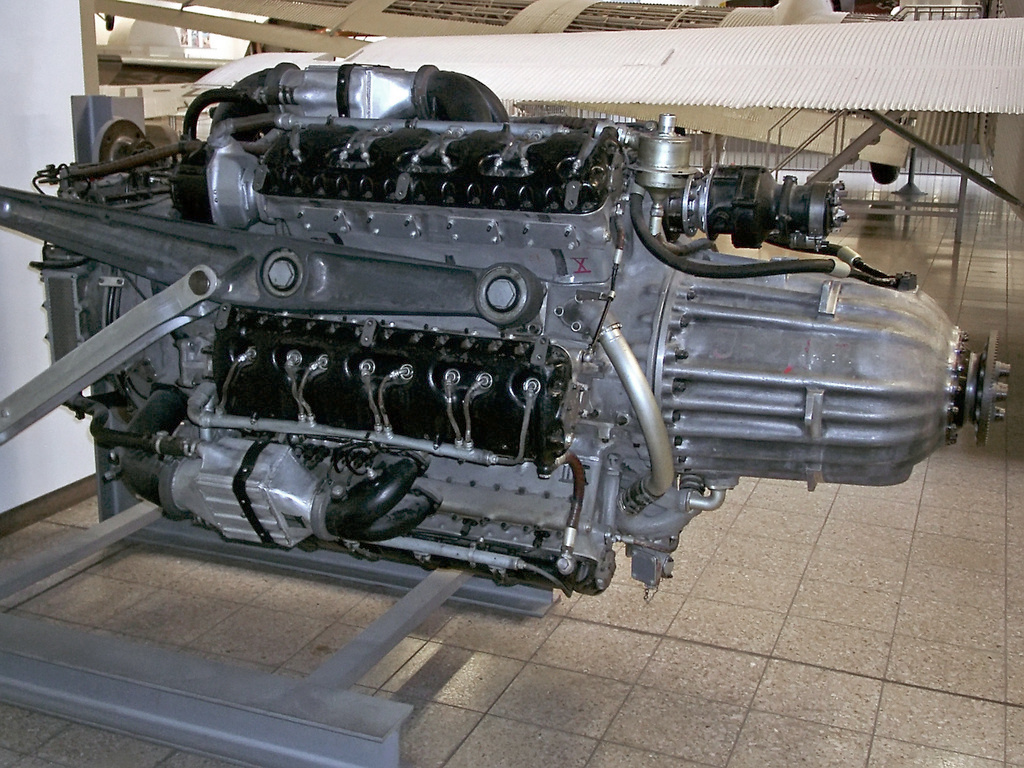
The Jumo 222 engine, on which so much depended concerning the Bomber B project

Prototype airframes of the Ju 288 and Fw 191 designs were ready mid-1940 but neither the Jumo 222 nor the DB 604 were ready. Both teams decided to power their prototypes with the BMW 801 radial engine, although with 670 kW (900 hp) less per engine and with the BMW 801 radials themselves barely out of initial development, the planes were seriously underpowered. For comparative purposes, the nearly-equal displacement Wright Twin Cyclone radial engine was powering the American B-25 Mitchell twin-engined medium bomber with some 1,270 kW (1,700 hp) apiece of output, even with the B-25 having only a top airspeed of some 440 km/h (270 mph) at a take off weight of 15.9 t (35,000 lb).

The first Jumo 222A/B development engines did not arrive until October 1941 and some eleven months later the DB 604 project was cancelled. By May 1942, in desperation, it was suggested that the Daimler-Benz DB 606 be used instead, even though it was considerably larger and heavier (1.5 t or 3,300 lb) and was well known to have serious problems. Prototypes of both designs with these engines were ordered, although the Fw 191 was just getting into the air with the BMW 801 radials at this point and the Ju 288 was showing a continual tendency to break its main landing gear on touchdown, partly due to its undercarriage problems caused by its complex method of stowing the oleo struts during retraction.

The RLM had no designs to fill the gap left if Bomber B did not work, even though some minor designs like the Henschel Hs 130, usually powered with two DB 603 or 605 engines and the Dornier Do 317, being tried with the same, trouble-prone DB 606 or 610 "welded-together engines" on some of its prototype airframes were also being considered. A slightly improved Ju 88, based on the prototype Ju 88B design, was ordered as the Ju 188 and several prototypes of stretched versions of existing bomber designs with four engines were also ordered, as with Junkers' Ju 488 in 1943–44.

In June 1943, the T-Amt finally gave up. By this point, even if the Jumo 222 began working reliably—as it had started to do in the summer of 1943—a shortage of the metals needed for its high-temperature alloys meant it would not be able to enter production in any case, with just under 300 development powerplants built. The three-year development period during the war in Europe, which yielded no combat-ready designs, indicated that the Bomber B project was a time-consuming endeavor that produced nothing. This situation also ensured that no alternative designs were available by late 1943, when their existing twin-engine medium bombers, mostly developed in the mid-to-late 1930s, began to become hopelessly outdated.

With the failure of Bomber B, four engine versions of the He 177, which had first been officially considered as early as October 1941 with the "He 177H" paper-only derivative, the ancestor of the Heinkel He 274 high-altitude design project, were considered as replacements for the mainline variants of the He 177A through most of 1943. The trio of completed DB 603-powered He 177B prototypes would start their flight tests by the end of 1943. Production of the B-series He 177s by Arado Flugzeugwerke, the prime subcontractor for Heinkel's heavy bombers, was never undertaken as the Arado firm had priority for its jet-powered Arado Ar 234 bomber and by early July 1944, four months before Arado would be able to commence license-built construction of the He 177B-5, the Luftwaffe began the Emergency Fighter Program.
