= Arado E.340 =

Planned German twin-engined bomber

E.340

General information
- Type: Bomber
- National origin: Germany
- Manufacturer: Arado Flugzeugwerke
- Status: Cancelled
- Primary user: Luftwaffe
- Number built: 0

The Arado Ar E.340 was a twin-engined dive- and tactical-medium bomber, designed by Arado Flugzeugwerke at the request of the Reich Air Ministry in 1939 to compete for a production contract for the Bomber B fast bomber design competition, but the project was cancelled.

== Design and development ==
The Reich Air Ministry ordered the aircraft to replace the Junkers Ju 88 and Dornier Do 217 bombers by 1943. Four manufacturers submitted plans to the Air Ministry, which chose the Arado design. The engines were positioned in a unique twin-boom arrangement connected only through the wing assembly, a configuration which offered the crew better visibility.

The Arado E.340 was designed with a central fuselage containing all four crew members. The cockpit and rear compartment were glazed and pressurized. The Jumo engines and landing gear were mounted to the load-bearing wing centre-section. The tail of the aircraft was a unique design, where the tailplane did not connect the two booms but was cantilevered outwards instead, each similar to the asymmetric BV 141B booms and tail arrangement. Also similarly, this would have provided the rear gunner with a clear range of fire directly behind. The fuselage extended forwards beyond the engines, with the gunners situated behind the cockpit, ahead of the bomb bay and wing spars. The MG 151 cannon in the tail of the central fuselage would have been controlled with remote aiming through periscopes. There were also two remote-controlled Fernbedienbare Drehlafette FDL 131 13mm gun turrets to be placed above and below the fuselage.

The E.340 was one of the steadily growing number of later-war military airframe designs designed to use the troublesome Junkers Jumo 222 engine. Otherwise an innovative design, these powerful engines were selected because they would have allowed the Arado E.340 to carry the required payload of 5,900 kg (13,000 lb) within a relatively compact airframe, despite their still-strictly developmental nature. As the engines were cancelled, the project would likely have failed due to the lack of engines of suitable power, and could have struggled with the amount of high grade fuel needed to power them. Ultimately, the entire Bomber B project was cancelled, primarily as a result of the failure to develop the required engines.

== Specifications ==
General characteristics

- Crew: four
- Length: 18.65 m (61 ft 2 in)
- Wingspan: 22.98 m (75 ft 5 in)
- Max takeoff weight: 24,000 kg (52,911 lb)
- Powerplant: 2 × Jumo 222 or Daimler-Benz DB 604 or BMW 802 large piston engines

Performance

- Range: 3,600 km (2,200 mi, 1,900 nmi) with 2,000 kg (4,400 lb) bomb load

Armament

- Guns:
  - 3 × MG 151/20 20 mm (0.787 in) cannon
  - 2 × Fernbedienbare Drehlafette FDL 131 remote turrets
  - 2 × MG 131 machine guns
- Rockets: 6
