= Dornier Do 317 =

1943 aircraft type

Do 317
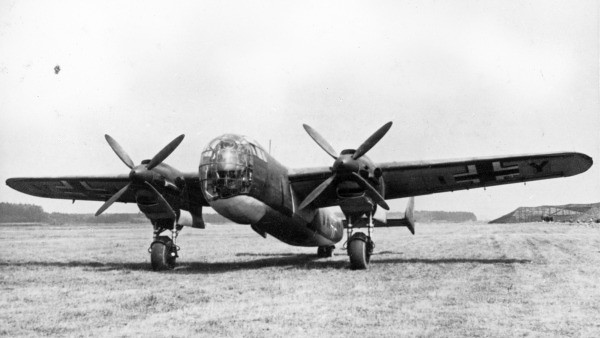
- Dornier Do 317 V1

General information
- Type: Medium bomber
- Manufacturer: Dornier Flugzeugwerke
- Primary user: Luftwaffe
- Number built: 6

History
- First flight: 8 September 1943
- Developed from: Dornier Do 217

The Dornier Do 317 was a prototype German medium bomber of World War II.

== Design and development ==
In 1939, Dornier produced plans for a further development of the Do 217, which would have a pressurized cabin and more powerful engines (DB 604, BMW 802 or Jumo 222). Designated Do 317, it was one of the four proposals submitted to the RLM for the "Bomber B" project. Two versions of the Do 317 were proposed: the simplified Do 317A, powered by two DB 603A engines and featuring conventional defensive armament, and the more advanced Do 317B with the heavy, 1.5 tonnes apiece, counter-rotating DB 610A/B "power system" engines, remotely aimed Fernbedienbare Drehlafette (FDL)-style gun turrets, higher bombload, and an extended wing. The "Bomber B" project was partially based on improved engines, however its engines such as the DB 604 and Jumo 222 failed to reach full production. As a result, the Do 317 had to use the less powerful engines.

Six prototypes of the Do 317A were ordered, and the first of these, the Do 317 V1, commenced its flight test program on 8 September 1943. The Do 317 V1 was very similar in appearance to the Do 217K and M models, with a visually reframed slight variation of its multiple glazed-panel "stepless cockpit", fully glazed nose design that accommodated a pressurized cabin provision, and triangular tailfins. Trials with the Do 317 V1 revealed no real performance advance over the Do 217, and before long the Do 317B variant was shelved and the other five Do 317 prototypes were completed as unpressurised Do 217Rs. They were issued to III./KG 100 in Autumn 1944, but saw little or no operational service.

== Specifications (Do 317A) ==
Data from Die Deutsche Luftrüstung 1933–1945

General characteristics

- Crew: 4
- Length: 16.8 m (55 ft 1 in)
- Wingspan: 20.63 m (67 ft 8 in)
- Height: 5.44 m (17 ft 10 in)
- Wing area: 68 m^{2} (730 sq ft)
- Gross weight: 20,140 kg (44,401 lb)
- Powerplant: 2 × Daimler-Benz DB 603A inverted V-12 liquid-cooled piston engine, 1,300 kW (1,750 hp) each

Performance

- Maximum speed: 560 km/h (350 mph, 300 kn) at 6,000 m (20,000 ft)
- Cruise speed: 420 km/h (260 mph, 230 kn)
- Stall speed: 133 km/h (83 mph, 72 kn)
- Range: 3,980 km (2,470 mi, 2,150 nmi)
- Service ceiling: 9,800 m (32,200 ft)

Armament

- Guns:

3 × 13 mm (0.512 in) MG 131 machine gun in upper turret, rear dorsal, and rear ventral positions
2 × 7.92 mm (0.312 in) MG 81 machine gun in nose
1 × 15 mm (0.591 in) MG 151 cannon in nose

- Bombs: Up to 4,000 kg (8,818 lb) of disposable stores

== See also ==
Related development

- Dornier Do 217

Aircraft of comparable role, configuration, and era

- Focke-Wulf Fw 191
- Junkers Ju 288

Related lists

- List of military aircraft of Germany
