= Junkers Jumo 222 =

German piston aircraft engine

Jumo 222
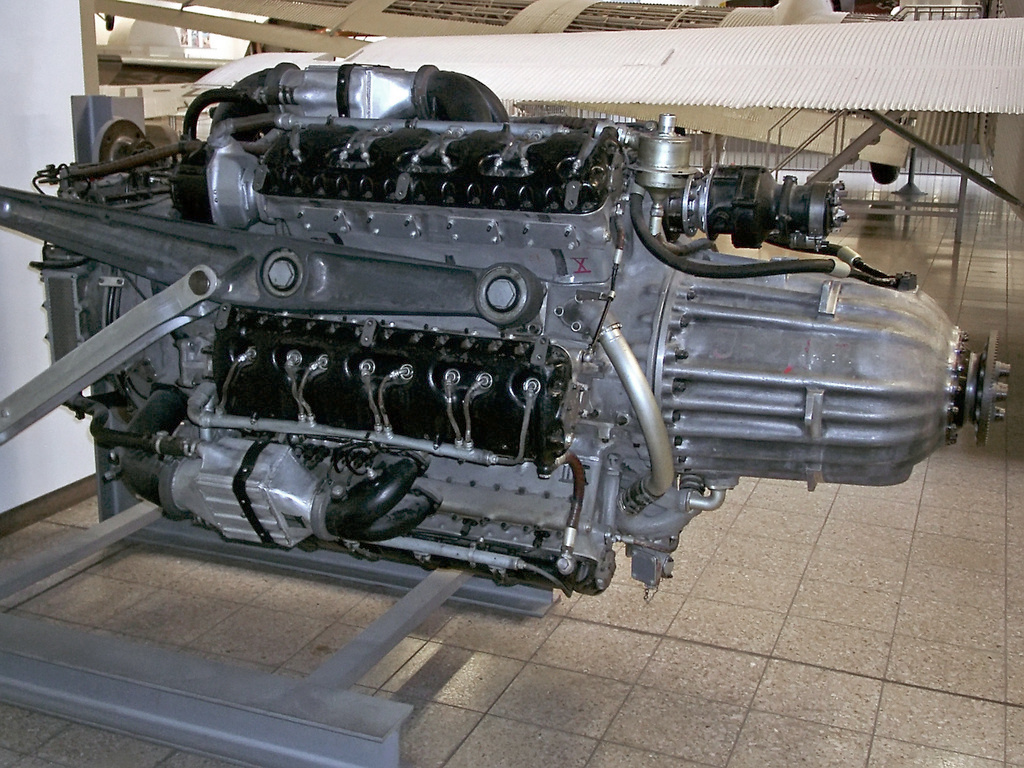
- Preserved Jumo 222E, with aftercoolers fitted
- Type: Multiple bank in-line piston aero-engine
- Manufacturer: Junkers
- First run: 1939
- Major applications: Junkers Ju 288; Focke-Wulf Fw 191
- Number built: 289

The Jumo 222 was a German high-power multiple-bank in-line piston aircraft engine from Junkers, designed under the management of Ferdinand Brandner of the Junkers Motorenwerke.

Such was the projected performance of the engine compared to contemporary designs that many developments of wartime Luftwaffe piston-engined aircraft designs were based on it, at least as an option. These included the entire Bomber B program, which looked to replace all existing Luftwaffe bombers with a new twin-engine design that was larger, faster and more heavily armed than any aircraft in their inventory.

The design failed to mature even after years of intensive development and several major design changes. The Bomber B program failed along with it, leaving the Luftwaffe with hopelessly outdated designs during the second half of the war. Fewer than three hundred 222s were built. They never left the prototype phase, but the design nevertheless continued appearing on proposals for new Luftwaffe multi-engined designs long after most had given up hope it would ever work.

== Design and development ==
Design work on the Jumo 222 started in 1937. The engine was configured with six inline cylinder banks spaced at equal angles around the crankcase, each bank having four cylinders. The engine looked like a radial due to the arrangement; this was evident from a cross-sectional drawing of the original version, using a master connecting rod with five additional connecting rods pivoted from the master rod's crankpin end casting, as with a single-row radial. But the internal workings were designed to operate more like a V engine with each adjacent pair of cylinder banks, each with a crossflow head, and it was liquid-cooled like most inlines.

Looking at a complete Jumo 222 from a "nose-on" view, the half-dozen cylinder banks were arranged at 60° equal angles from each other, such that neighbouring banks had their exhaust ports (at the "60°, 180° & 300°" spaces) and intake ports (at the "0°, 120° & 240°" spaces) facing each other, resulting in simpler "plumbing" from the rear-mounted supercharger and resulting in only three sets of exhaust headers. The trio of exhaust header sets would have been most likely present at the bottom of an engine nacelle, and on the upper quarters to either side (appearing like the exhausts for many Allied "upright" V-style aviation engines) for the shortest possible exhaust outlet routing.

The four-cylinder-long multibank design resulted in a shorter engine than the Jumo 211, by roughly 80 cm/31.5 in, but larger cross-section nacelle design. Like the Ju 88, it could use an annular radiator to cool the 222's cylinders and motor oil. The Junkers Ju 288 intended to hide the radiators behind hollow ducted spinners with each of its four-blade propellers.

Each cylinder had two intake valves and a single sodium-cooled exhaust valve—a triple-valve configuration inherited from the first Jumo-series inverted V12 aviation engine, the Junkers Jumo 210—a high-pressure fuel injector between the intakes, and two spark plugs. With a bore and stroke of 135 mm (5.3 in), the original Jumo 222A/B engine design had a displacement of 46.4 L (2,831.5 in³), in the same general displacement class as the Double Wasp American eighteen cylinder air-cooled radial of 1937–1940 origin. The 222A/B model was forced to run at a fairly low 6.5:1 compression ratio, the same ratio as used by the volume-produced Jumo 211C inverted-V12 from their firm. Such comparatively low compression ratios were the best possible ones given the low-octane fuels available in Germany, but by increasing the speed of the engine to 3,200 rpm, the 222 delivered 1,850 kW (2,480 hp) at takeoff. The only disappointing feature was the simple, single-stage two-speed supercharger, but even with this limitation, the engine still generated 1,641 kW (2,201 hp) at 5,000 m (16,000 ft). The dry weight was 1,088 kg (2,399 lb), only some 17 kg (37 lb) heavier than the air-cooled Double Wasp.

Compared with the contemporary BMW 801 and Daimler-Benz DB 605, the 222 was a huge leap in performance. It had only slightly larger displacement than the 801's 41.8 L (2,550.8 in³), and about 25% more than the 605's 35.7 L (2,178.5 in³), but delivered considerably more power, 1,850 kW (2,480 hp) compared to 1,193 kW (1,600 hp) in the 801 and 1,119 kW (1,501 hp) in the 605. That represents 40 kW/L for the 222, while only 29 kW/L for the 801, and 31 kW/L for the 605. The power-to-weight ratio was 1.7 kW/kg (1.04 hp/lb) for the 222, whereas the 605 delivered 1.4 kW/kg (0.88 hp/lb), and the 801 1 kW/kg (0.60 hp/lb). The 222 also had similar exterior dimensions as these smaller engines, 1.16 m (3.8 ft) across compared to 1.27 m (4.2 ft) for the 801, and 2.4 m (7.9 ft) long compared to 2.3 m (7.5 ft) for the 605.

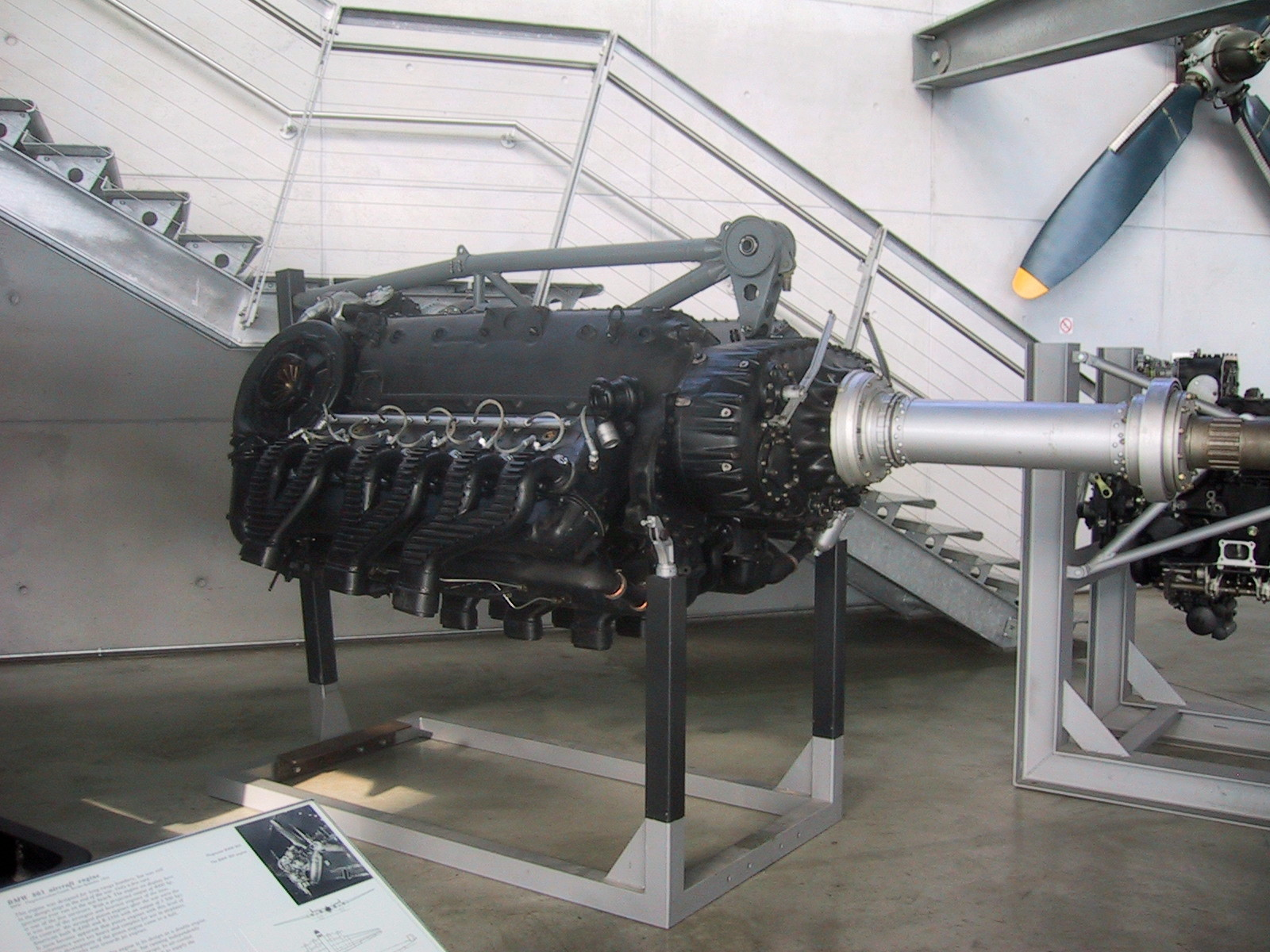
A DB 610 "power system" for comparison with the Jumo 222

The comparison was even more favourable against other high-power engines under development. One such was the BMW 802 18-cylinder radial, an enlarged version of their highly successful 14-cylinder BMW 801. However, work didn't start until 1939, and while promising, it weighed 1,530 kg (3,370 lb) and was only first run in 1943. BMW also tried putting two 801 radials together in the BMW 803, which was not successful. Then there was the cumbersome DB 606, the first-ever "high-output" powerplant developed in Germany, consisted of two DB 601's mounted to a single reduction gear case on their front ends, that delivered 1,790 kW (2,400 hp) with a weight of 1,515 kg (3,340 lb), and was 2.1 m × 1.6 m × 1.1 m (83 in × 63 in × 43 in)ft) in size. Their troubled use and deficient installation design in the He 177A, Germany's only heavy bomber aircraft to see production and front-line service, prompted Reichsmarschall Hermann Göring to derisively label them in the late summer of 1942 as "welded-together engines".

Conversely, the RLM was excited by the possibilities of the much more compact Jumo 222's design features, and the X engine configuration, 24 cylinder DB 604, of similar weight and displacement to the 222A but with somewhat lower specific power output. The RLM based their entire Bomber B program on pairs of these engines, which would deliver a bomber with the warload of the He 177 and even better speed than the Ju 88, a truly universal design.

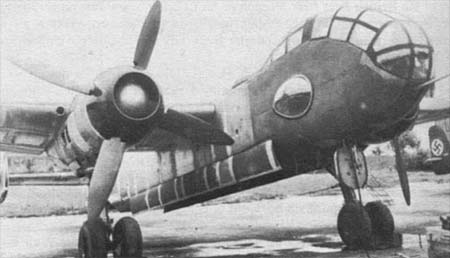
A Junkers Ju 288 prototype powered by Jumo 222 engines, with ducted spinners and counter-rotating propellers.

The first prototype engine ran on 24 April 1939, and was later air-tested on the nose-engine mount of a Ju 52. Production called for two primary models, the 222A and 222B, which differed only in the direction that they spun, intended to be used for left-hand (portside wing) and right-hand (starboard wing) engines on twin-engine designs. However, continued testing went poorly, and Junkers eventually decided it was best to stop development of these "Series I" engines and move onto a modified "Series II". The new 222A-2 and B-2 ran at a slightly slower rpm but had slightly larger cylinders of 140 mm/5.5 in bore (49.88 litres, 3043.86 in³) for the same net performance, while the A-3 and B-3 used a different supercharger for better performance at higher altitudes. One A-3 and B-3 powerplant each were allegedly fitted to the ninth Junkers Ju 288 prototype airframe for flight tests. Both "uprated" models of the Jumo 222A/B versions continued to prove unreliable, and were fitted only experimentally.

By late 1941, Junkers decided the best course of action was to make more radical changes to the design, and introduced the 222C and 222D models. With a new bore and stroke of 145 mm × 140 mm (5.7 in × 5.5 in), the engine displacement increased a second time, to 55.5 L (3,386.8 in³), just very slightly larger than the contemporary Wright Duplex Cyclone American 18-cylinder air-cooled radial engine, which at the time was having its own significant problems ironed out, partially from the use of combustible magnesium-alloy metal for its crankcase. Back at the original 3,200 rpm, the Jumo 222 C/D models could deliver just under 2,200 kW (3,000 hp) when they started running in the summer of 1942. However, the problems were not cured, and only a handful were built. The RLM had been waiting for three years at this point, and eventually gave up and had all designs based on it look for alternate engines. Later that year, they gave up on that as well, and cancelled the entire Bomber B program outright.

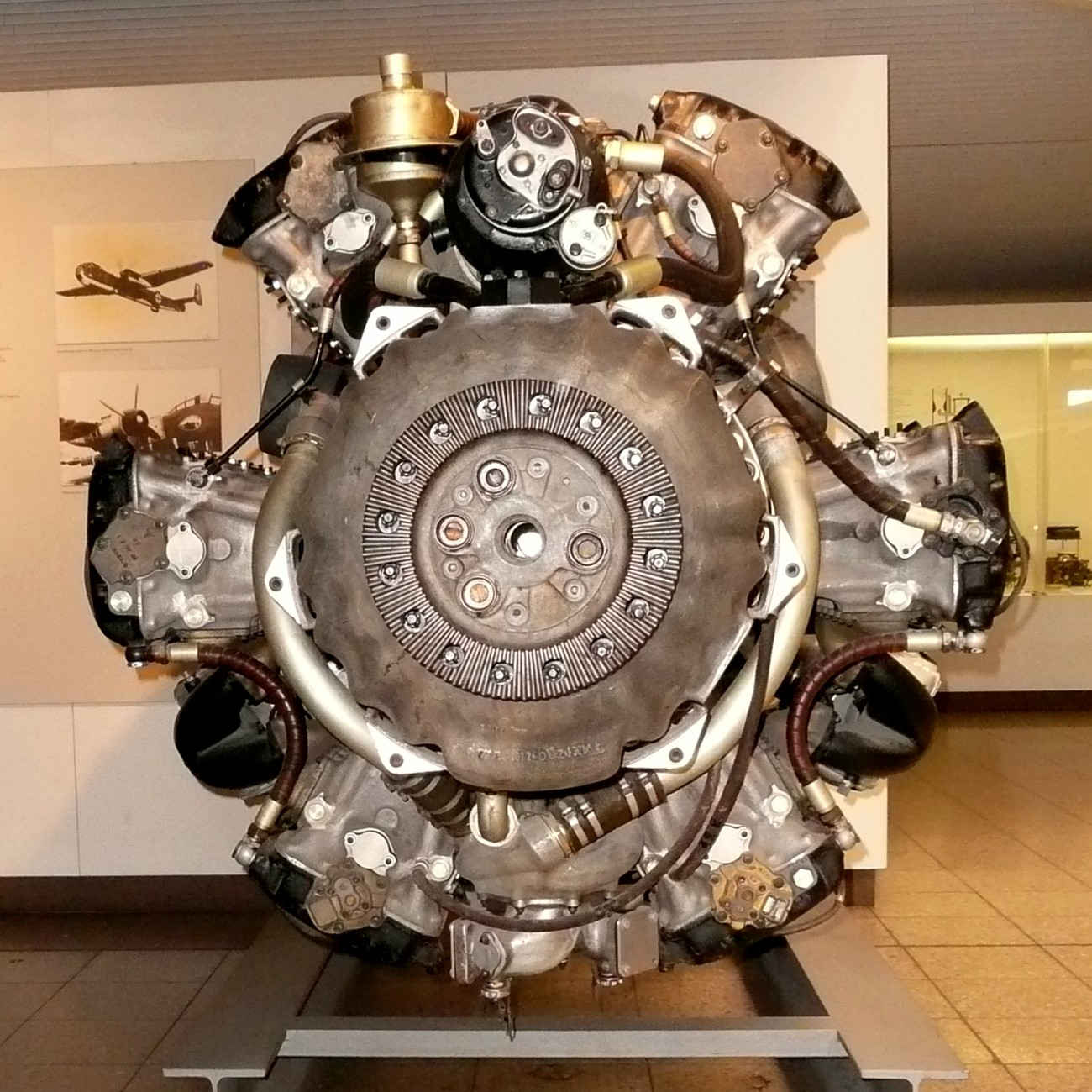
Jumo 222 E built in 1944

Junkers still did not give up. Using the original 46.4 litre displacement A/B design, they added a new two-stage supercharger including a trio of aftercoolers, one per pair of neighboring cylinder banks for high-altitude use, producing the 222E and F-series. Although sea-level performance was unchanged, the engine was able to produce 1,439 kW (1,930 hp) at 9,000 m (30,000 ft). By this point it appeared that the problems were finally being worked out, but bombing of the Junkers Motorenwerke's headquarters factories in Dessau made production almost impossible. A final attempt for even higher altitude performance resulted in the turbocharged 222G and H, built only to the extent of a few testbed prototypes.

The Jumo 222 was a massive and very costly failure. 289 examples of the Jumo 222's were built in total, none of which saw active service. It also served to seriously hamper Luftwaffe piston-engined designs from 1940 to 1942, while many personnel within the Luftwaffe's government-operated technology development offices (like Oberst Edgar Petersen's chain of several Erprobungsstelle installations) and German military aviation corporate engineering departments waited for the Jumo 222 to finally start working. Meanwhile, all calls for four-engine adaptations in place of twin-engine Jumo 222 powered designs were rejected because it was felt it would place too much strain on the German engine industry. In the end there was nothing to show for it, and late in the war the Luftwaffe was flying barely updated versions of their original pre-war designs.

== Variants ==
None of the JuMo 222 variants achieved operational service.

- Jumo 222 A / B-1: first version bore x stroke (135 × 135) = 46,380 cm³, 1,470 kW (1,970 hp) at 3200 min -1, single-stage two-speed centrifugal supercharger, "service-test" A-0/B-0 series, flight tested
- Jumo 222 A / B-2: enlarged variant larger valve cross sections bore x stroke(140 × 135) = 49880 cm³, 2500 hp at 2900 min -1, single-stage two-speed centrifugal supercharger, zero series, flight tested
- Jumo 222 A / B-3: as A / B-2, but improved centrifugal supercharger, full pressure altitude: 6000 m, pilot series, flight-tested
- Jumo 222C / D: further enlarged variant bore x stroke (145 × 140) = 55,480 cm³, 3000 hp at 3200 min -1, full pressure altitude: 10.000 m, by designed V-series experimental models in the assembly
- Jumo 222 E / F:, like A / B-3, with two-stage two-speed centrifugal supercharger and trio of aftercoolers, full pressure altitude: 9400 m, pilot series, flight-tested
- Jumo 222 turbo:, like A / B-3, with turbocharger and intercooling, full pressure altitude: 12,300 m, 2400 hp at 3200 min -1, only test bench
- Jumo 222 G / 225:, projected, lengthened version with 6 × 6 = 36 cylinder bore x stroke (135 × 135) = 69570 cm³, 3500 hp at 3000 min -1, and speed charging increasable

The direction of rotation of the propeller shaft was indicated by the letter - A, C and E turned to the left while B, D and F turned to the right. The crankshaft, however, always ran uniformly to the right; the propeller running direction was varied only by different gears.

Since the Junkers Jumo 222 has six cylinder banks, it is one of the so-called Hexagon engines. Other examples of hexagon engines are rare - for example, the 24-cylinder water-cooled Dobrynin VD-4K and the 12-cylinder air-cooled Curtiss H-1640 Chieftain. Analogously, there were also octagon engines such as the Bristol Hydra with eight cylinder banks.

== Applications ==
Aircraft designs intended to be powered by the Jumo 222:

- Dornier Do 435 (when no jet engine replaced the rear piston engine)
- Focke-Wulf Fw 300
- Heinkel He 219B & -C
- Heinkel He 277 (as a later Amerikabomber-related alternative to fitting six BMW 801 radials, late July 1943 development proposal only)
- Hütter Hü 211
- Junkers Ju 288

Prototype proposals designed to use Jumo 222 engine power:

- Arado E.340 (twin 222s, a Bomber B competitor)
- Focke-Wulf Fw P.195 (six/eight Jumo 222s, very large transport aircraft)

== Specifications (Jumo 222A/B) ==
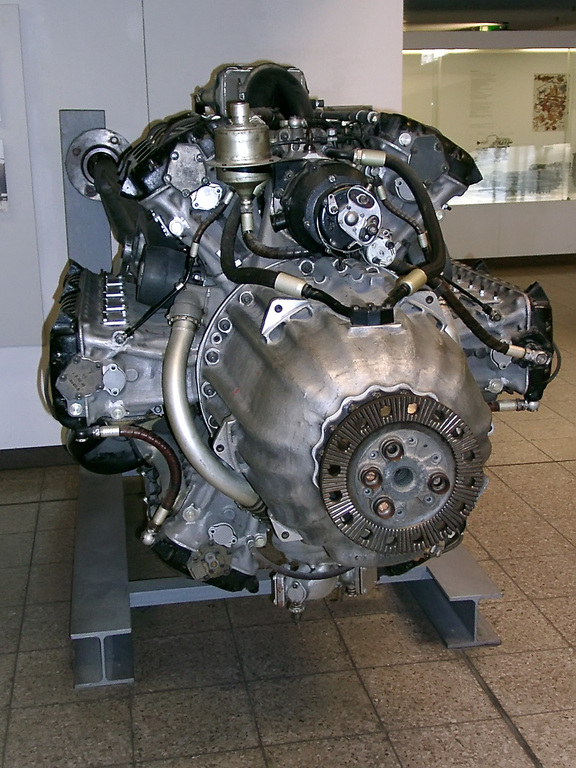
Front view of a Jumo 222, with aftercoolers fitted

=== General characteristics ===
- Type: 6-bank, 24-cylinder supercharged liquid-cooled in-line aircraft engine
- Bore: 135 mm (5.3 in)
- Stroke: 135 mm (5.3 in)
- Displacement: 46.38 L (2,830 cu in)
- Length: 2,400 mm (94 in)
- Diameter: 1,160 mm (46 in)
- Dry weight: 1,088 kg (2,399 lb)

=== Components ===
- Valvetrain: Two intake valves and one sodium-cooled exhaust valve per cylinder
- Supercharger: Single-stage two-speed centrifugal type supercharger
- Fuel system: Fuel injection
- Cooling system: Liquid-cooled

=== Performance ===
- Power output:
- 1,838 kW (2,465 hp) at 3,200 rpm for takeoff
- 1,397 kW (1,873 hp) cruise
- Specific power: 39.5 kW/L (0.87 hp/in³)
- Compression ratio: 6.5:1
- Specific fuel consumption: 0.29 kg/(kW·h) (0.477 lb/(hp·h))
- Power-to-weight ratio: 1.69 kW/kg (1.03 hp/lb)

== See also ==
Comparable engines

- Armstrong Siddeley Deerhound
- Armstrong Siddeley Hyena
- BMW 803
- Daimler-Benz DB 604
- Dobrynin VD-4K
- Hitachi Ha-51
- Lycoming R-7755
- Napier Sabre
- Wright R-2160 Tornado

Related lists

- List of aircraft engines
- List of aircraft engines of Germany during World War II

== Bibliography ==
- Bingham, Victor (1998). Major Piston Aero Engines of World War II. Shrewsbury, UK: Airlife Publishing. ISBN 1-84037-012-2.
- Christopher, John (2013). The Race for Hitler's X-Planes: Britain's 1945 Mission to Capture Secret Luftwaffe Technology. Stroud, UK: History Press. ISBN 978-0-7524-6457-2.
- Gunston, Bill (2006). World Encyclopedia of Aero Engines: From the Pioneers to the Present Day (5th ed.). Stroud, UK: Sutton. ISBN 0-7509-4479-X.
- Kay, Antony (2004). Junkers Aircraft & Engines 1913–1945. London: Putnam Aeronautical Books. ISBN 0-85177-985-9.
