= Hütter Hü 211 =

Nazi fighter plane

Hü 211

General information
- Type: Night fighter, reconnaissance
- National origin: Nazi Germany
- Status: Never flown
- Primary user: Luftwaffe
- Number built: 2

History
- Developed from: Heinkel He 219

The Hütter Hü 211 was a German prototype long-range reconnaissance and heavy night fighter commissioned by the Reich Air Ministry in late 1944. The project stopped after an air raid destroyed the prototypes before they were finished.

== Design and development ==
Wolfgang Hütter had been a peripheral figure in the design of German aircraft in World War II, specializing in glider construction. However, his glider expertise could usefully be employed in long-range, high-altitude aircraft, and Heinkel suggested he be involved in the modification of their He 219 aircraft for long-range reconnaissance and as a night fighter.

Hütter was asked to complete the design as quickly as possible, and borrowed heavily from the existing He 219, Junkers Ju 288 and Dornier Do 335. The only parts of new design were the wings and tail surfaces, which were constructed from wood as a weight-saving measure to enable better performance. The wings were extremely long, and resembled those of a high-performance sailplane. The cockpit was pressurized and, like the He 219, fitted with ejection seats. The finished product was meant to be delivered in February 1945 and to be able to evade British de Havilland Mosquito fighters. There were also plans for variants powered by jet engines for the purpose of achieve higher altitudes but these were never carried out.

Work was stopped after the two prototypes were destroyed by an air raid in December 1944.

== Specifications ==
Data from

General characteristics

- Crew: 2
- Length: 16.5 m (54 ft 2 in)
- Wingspan: 24.5 m (80 ft 5 in)
- Height: 4.8 m (15 ft 9 in)
- Wing area: 40 m^{2} (430 sq ft)
- Empty weight: 9,480 kg (20,900 lb)
- Gross weight: 17,500 kg (38,581 lb)
- Powerplant: 2 × Jumo 222 24-cylinder multi-bank supercharged liquid-cooled piston engine, 2,387 kW (3,201 hp) each

Performance

- Maximum speed: 710 km/h (440 mph, 380 kn) at 7,200 m (23,616 ft)
- Range: 6,350 km (3,950 mi, 3,430 nmi) at cruising speed
- Service ceiling: 16,000 m (52,000 ft)
- Rate of climb: 14.1 m/s (2,780 ft/min)

Armament

- Guns: 4 × 20 mm MG 151/20 cannon, two firing forward and two aft

== See also ==
Related development

- Heinkel He 219
- Junkers Ju 288
- Dornier Do 335

Aircraft of comparable role, configuration, and era

- Westland Welkin

Related lists

- List of military aircraft of Germany
- List of World War II military aircraft of Germany
- List of WW2 Luftwaffe aircraft prototype projects
