= Dornier Do 335 =

Fighter aircraft family by Dornier

Do 335 Pfeil
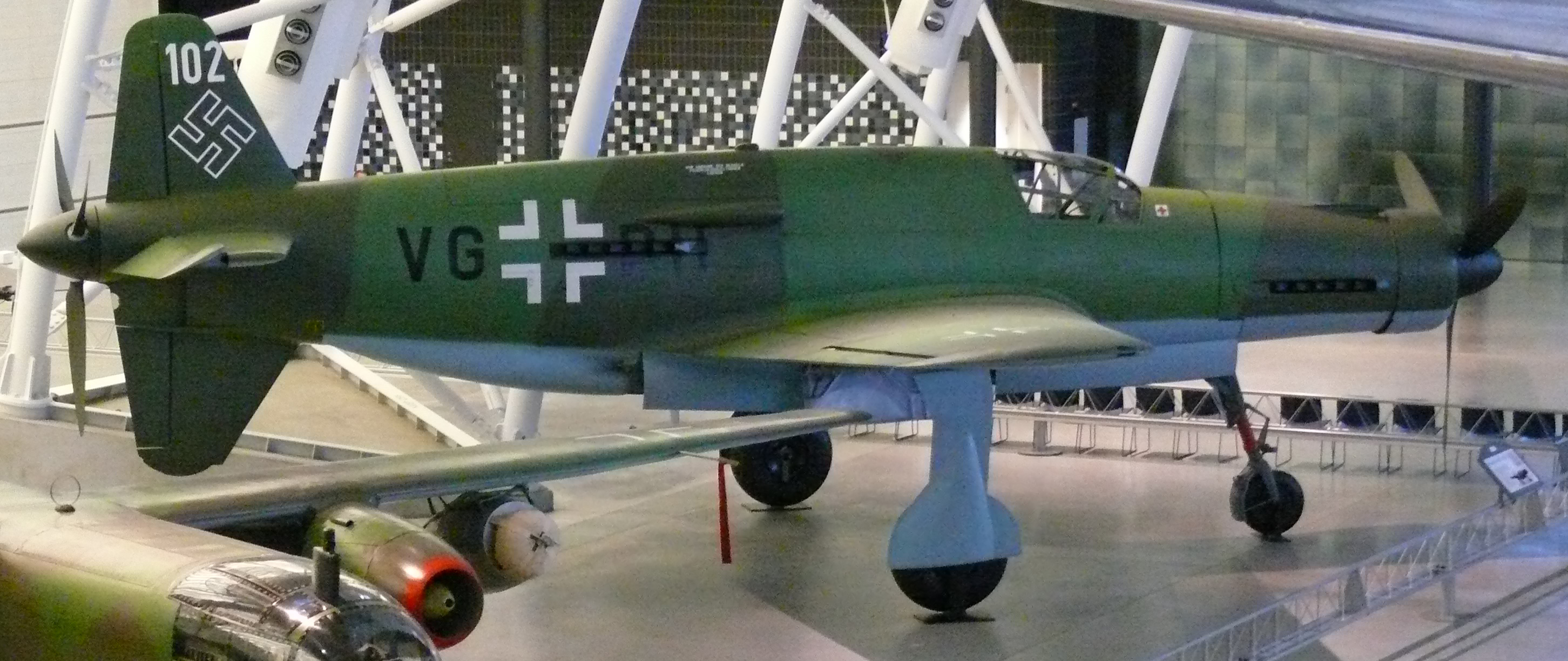

General information
- Type: Fighter-bomber
- National origin: Nazi Germany
- Manufacturer: Dornier Flugzeugwerke
- Status: Retired
- Primary user: Luftwaffe
- Number built: 37

History
- Manufactured: 1944–1945
- Introduction date: 1944
- First flight: 26 October 1943
- Retired: 1945

The Dornier Do 335 Pfeil (Arrow) is a heavy fighter built by Dornier for Germany during World War II. The Pfeil's performance was predicted to be better than other twin-engined designs due to its unusual push-pull configuration and the lower aerodynamic drag of the in-line alignment of the two engines. It is considered one of the fastest piston-engined aircraft ever and was Nazi Germany's fastest piston-engined aircraft of World War II. The Luftwaffe was desperate to get the design into operational use, but delays in engine deliveries meant that only a handful were delivered before the war ended, and it never saw combat.

The Do 335 was originally designed as a Schnellbomber. It could reach speeds around 800 km/h in level flight and could outrun most other military aircraft in service at the time, with only first-generation jet fighters being faster.

== Design and development ==
The origin of the Do 335 goes back to World War I, when Claude Dornier designed a number of flying boats with tandem engines. These were used on most of the multiengined Dornier flying boats that followed, including the highly successful Do J Wal and the gigantic Do X. The main advantage of this arrangement is the reduced drag due to the smaller frontal area. It also keeps the weight of the twin powerplants near, or on, the aircraft centerline, increasing the roll rate compared to a traditional twin. In addition, a single engine failure does not lead to asymmetric thrust, and normal flight has no net torque, so the aircraft is easier to handle. The ventral fin–rudder of the cruciform tail protected the rear propeller from accidentally striking on takeoff. The presence of the rear pusher propeller also necessitated the provision for an ejection seat for safe escape from a damaged aircraft, and designing the rear propeller and dorsal fin mounts to use explosive bolts to jettison them before an ejection was attempted – as well as two canopy jettison levers, one per side located to either side of the forward cockpit interior just below the sills of the five-panel windscreen's sides, to jettison the canopy from atop the cockpit before ejection.

In 1939, Dornier, reviving a principle he had patented in 1937, was working on the P.59 high-speed bomber project, which used the tandem engine layout. In 1940, he commissioned a test aircraft, closely modeled on the airframe of the early versions of the Dornier Do 17 bomber, but only 40% of the size, with no aerodynamic bodies of any sort on the wing panels (the Do 17 had twin engine nacelles on its wings) and fitted with a retractable tricycle landing gear to validate his concept for turning the rear pusher propeller with an engine located far away from it, through the use of a long, tubular driveshaft. This aircraft, the Göppingen Gö 9, showed no unforeseen difficulties with this arrangement, but work on the P.59 was stopped in early 1940 when Hermann Göring ordered the cancellation of all projects that would not be completed within a year or so.

In May 1942, Dornier submitted an updated version with a 1,000 kg (2,200 lb) bomb load as the P.231, in response to a requirement for a single seat Schnellbomber-like high-speed bomber/intruder. The P.231 proposal was selected as the winner after beating rival designs from Arado, Junkers, and Blohm & Voss. A development contract was awarded by the RLM, issuing the Dornier firm the airframe approval number 8-335, for what would become known as the Do 335. In autumn 1942, Dornier was told that the Do 335 was no longer required, and instead a multirole fighter based on the same general layout would be accepted. This delayed the prototype delivery, as it was modified for the new role.

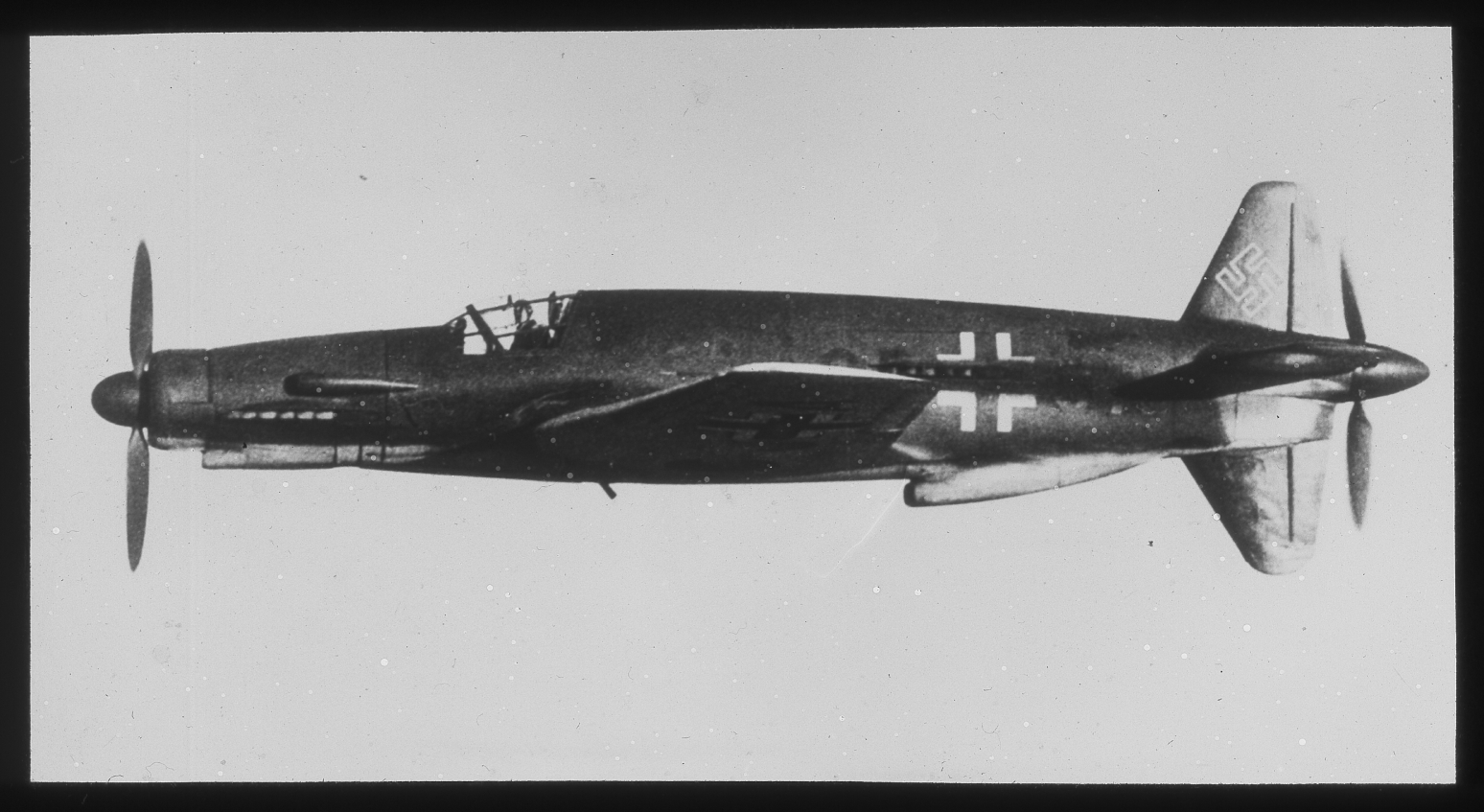
A Do 335 prototype in flight

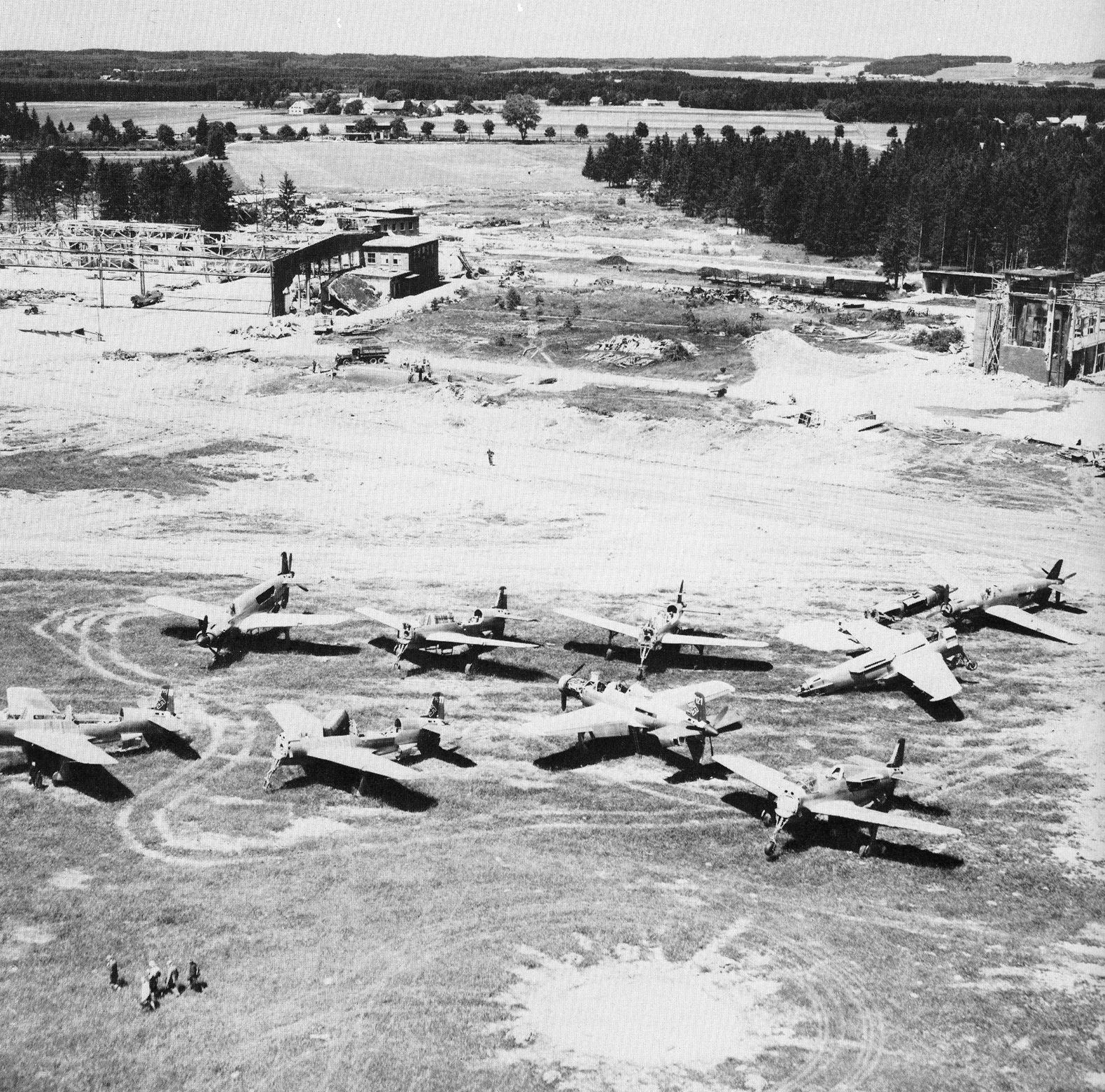
Do-335s on the apron at Oberpfaffenhofen at the war's end, including unfinished two-seat versions

When fitted with DB 603A engines delivering 1,750 PS (1,290 kW; 1,730 hp), it had a pair of the largest inverted V12 aircraft engines mass-produced during the Third Reich's existence. The Do 335 V1 first prototype CP+UA, flew on 26 October 1943 under the control of Flugkapitän Hans Dieterle, a regular Heinkel test pilot and later primary Dornier test pilot. However, several problems during the initial flight of the Do 335 would continue to plague the aircraft through most of its short history. Issues were found with the weak landing gear and the main gear's wheelwell doors, resulting in them being removed for the remainder of the V1's test flights. The Do 335 V1 made 27 flights, flown by three different pilots. During these test flights, the second prototype, V2 (Werk Nr 230002) CP+UB, was completed and made its first flight on 31 December 1943, again under the control of Dieterle. New to the V2 were upgraded DB 603A-2 engines and several refinements learned from the test flights of the V1 and further windtunnel testing. On 20 January 1944, the Do 335 V3 (W.Nr. 230004), CP+UC was completed and flown for its first time by Werner Altrogge. The V3 was powered by the new preproduction DB 603G-0 engines which could produce 1,900 PS (1,400 kW) at take-off and featured a slightly redesigned canopy that included twin rear-view mirrors in blisters, one in each of two matching side panels of the well-framed, 11-panel main canopy's openable section. Following the flights of the V3 in mid January 1944, RLM ordered five more prototypes (V21–V25), to be built as night fighters. By this time, more than 60 hours of flight time had been put on the Do 335, and reports showed it to be a good handling, but more importantly, very fast aircraft, described by Generalfeldmarschall Erhard Milch himself as "...holding its own in speed and altitude with the P-38 and it does not suffer from engine reliability issues". The Do 335 was scheduled to begin mass construction, with the initial order of 120 preproduction aircraft to be manufactured by Dornier-Werke Friedrichshafen to be completed no later than March 1946. This number included a number of bombers, destroyers (heavy fighters), and several yet-to-be-developed variants. At the same time, Dornier-Werke München in Munich was scheduled to build over 2,000 Do 335s in various models, due for delivery in March 1946, as well.

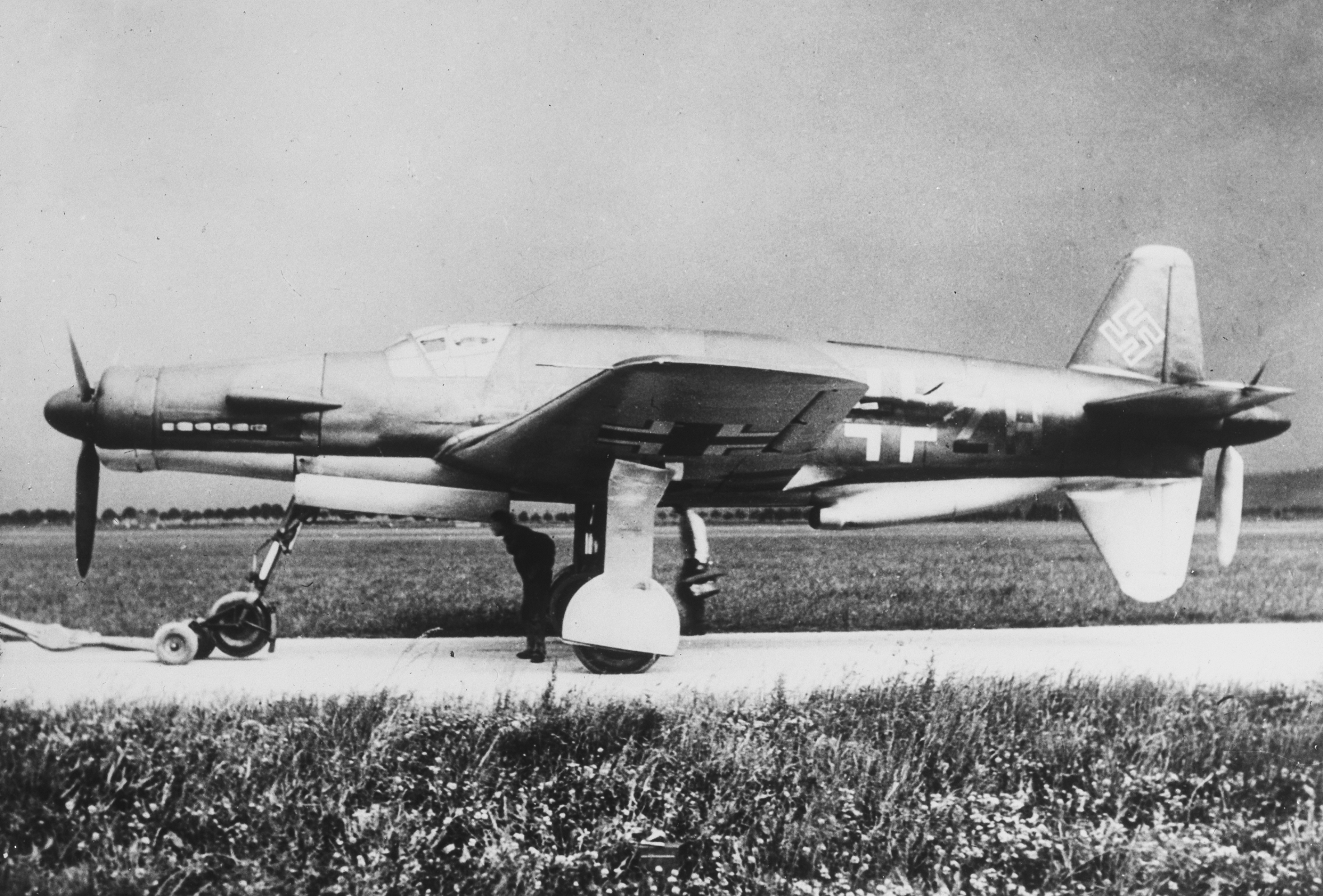
One of the prototypes under tow, date unknown

On 23 May 1944, Hitler, as part of the developing Jägernotprogramm (Emergency Fighter Program) directive, which took effect on 3 July, ordered maximum priority to be given to Do 335 production. The main production line was intended to be at Manzell, but a bombing raid in March destroyed the tooling and forced Dornier to set up a new line at Oberpfaffenhofen. The decision was made, along with the rapid shut-down of many other military aircraft development programs, to cancel the Heinkel He 219 night fighter, which also used the DB 603 engines (in well-unitized installations), and use its production facilities for the Do 335, as well. However, Ernst Heinkel managed to delay, and eventually ignore, its implementation, continuing to produce examples of the He 219A.

At least 16 prototype Do 335s are known to have flown (V1–V12, W.Nr 230001-230012 and Muster-series prototypes M13–M17, W.Nr 230013–230017) on a number of DB603 engine subtypes, including the DB 603A, A-2, G-0, E, and E-1. The first preproduction Do 335 (A-0s) starting with W.Nr 240101, Stammkennzeichen VG+PG, were delivered in July 1944. About 22 preproduction aircraft are thought to have been completed and flown before the end of the war, including around 11 A-0s converted to A-11s for training purposes. One such aircraft was transferred to the Royal Aircraft Establishment at Farnborough, and later, after a rear-engine fire burnt through the elevator controls during a flight, crashed onto a local school, destroying the aircraft and killing the test pilot.

== Flight tests ==
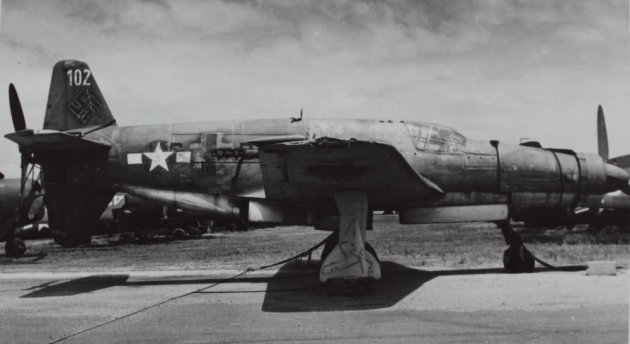
Do 335 tested in the US, and today the only surviving example

The Do 335V1 completed a high-speed cruise test of 754 km/h at 8600 m at combat power and 732 km/h at 8000 m at maximum cruise power on 23 May 1944. Later, the Do 335V6 completed a dive test at 910 km/h and 966 km/h at 6200 m on 9 June 1944.

== Operational history ==
Delivery commenced in January 1945. When the United States Army overran the Oberpfaffenhofen factory in late April 1945, only 11 Do 335 A-1 single-seat fighter-bombers and two Do 335 A-12 trainers had been completed. The two-seater trainer version was called Ameisenbär ("anteater").

French ace Pierre Clostermann claimed the first Allied combat encounter with a Pfeil in April 1945. He described leading a flight of four Hawker Tempests from No. 3 Squadron RAF over northern Germany when they came across an unknown aircraft whose description matched the Do 335's, flying at maximum speed at treetop level. Detecting the British aircraft, the German pilot reversed course to evade. Two pilots fired on the Dornier, but Clostermann, despite the Tempests' considerable low-altitude speed, decided not to attempt to chase it, as it was obviously much faster.

On 26 April 1945, the Do 335 V9, which was still at Rechlin, was test-flown by Oberleutnant Heinrich Schild. Later that day he escorted Hanna Reitsch and General der Flieger Robert von Greim's flight to Berlin-Gatow. After arriving at Gatow, Reitsch and von Greim commandeered a Fieseler Fi 156 Storch and flew to Hitler's bunker. Also on 26 April, Fliegerstabsing Heinz Fischer attempted to fly Do 335 V9 from Rechlin to Switzerland. Due to a compass failure, he strayed over France and ran out of fuel. Both the ejector seat and the tail jettison mechanism failed and he had to bail out over the Vosges Mountains.

== Proposed developments ==
=== Do 635 ===
In 1944, Junkers helped Dornier with work on the Do 335 Zwilling or Dornier Do 635. This consisted of two Do 335 fuselages joined by a common centre wing section, with two Rb 50 cameras in the port fuselage for aerial photography. Armament was confined to provision for five 60 kg (130 lb) photo-flash bombs. A meeting was arranged between Junkers and Heinkel engineers, and after the meeting, they began work on the project, named 1075 01–21. The designer, Professor Heinrich Hertel, planned a test flight in late 1945. At the end of 1944, the Germans reviewed aircraft designs with the Japanese military. Among other projects, the Do 635 impressed the Japanese military with its capabilities and design. The mainwheels were common with Ju 352 wheels. It was also intended that two monopropellant Walter Starthilfe RATOG units would be fitted. In early 1945, a wind-tunnel model was tested, and a cockpit mockup was constructed. Following an order from the Rüstungsstab on 15 March, it was decided that Junkers continue with the project, but only by using the simplest production methods. However, none had been completed by the war's end.

=== P 256 ===
The P 256 was to meet a Luftwaffe requirement issued 27 February 1945. It was designed to carry a crew of three (pilot, radar operator, and navigator), with pilot and radar operator together under the canopy, while the navigator was in the fuselage, an idea copied from Arado. Departing from centerline thrust, it was to have two Heinkel HeS 011 engines of 12.7 kN (2,900 lbf) each, podded under the wings in the fashion of the Me 262. The low-mounted wing was unswept, and had an aspect ratio of 5.8:1. Designed armament was four 30 mm (1.2 in) MK 108 cannons in the nose. A field conversion kit was to retrofit two MK 108s in a Schräge Musik configuration. A fighter-bomber variant would have carried two 500 kg (1,100 lb) bombs. Its loaded weight would have included 3,750 kg (8,270 lb) of fuel, giving a wing loading of 276 kg/m^{2} (57 lb/sq ft). Maximum speed was achieved at 8,000 m (26,000 ft), maximum range at 6,000 m (20,000 ft). Endurance with 4,000 kg (8,800 lb) fuel was calculated as 2.6 hours. Its electronics would have included FuG 24SE with ZVG 24, FuG 29, FuG 25a or c, and FuG 244 Bremen with Gnome weapon triggers. Criticized for having poor cross-sectional area and unduly large tail surfaces, it was not adopted.

== Variants ==
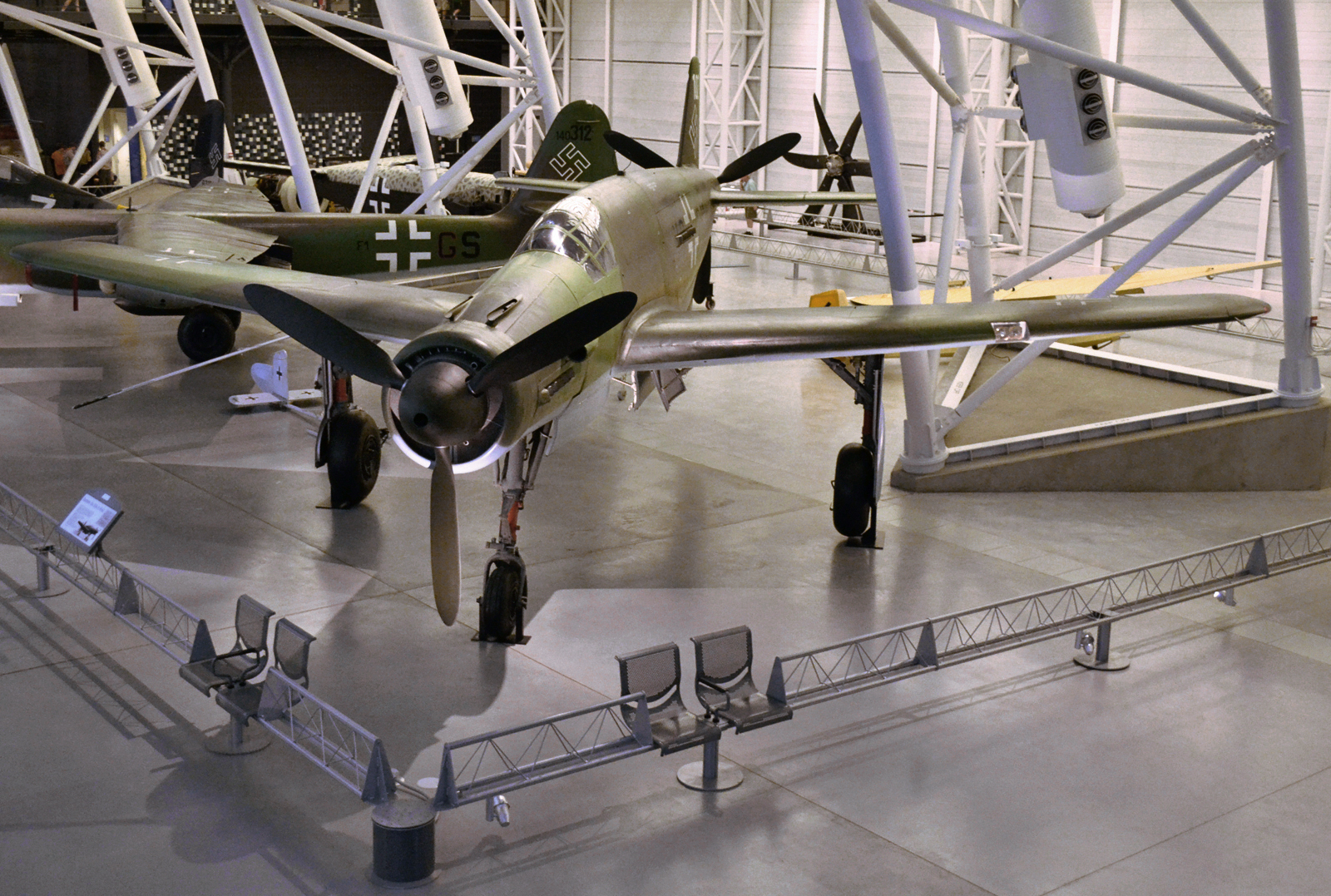
Dornier Do 335 240 102 on display at the Steven F. Udvar-Hazy Center in Chantilly, Virginia

Built

- Do 335 A-0 : 10 pre-production aircraft.
- Do 335 A-1 : Single-seat fighter-bomber aircraft.

Proposed

- Do 335 A-2: single-seat fighter-bomber aircraft with new weapon sights, later proposed longer wing and updated 1,471 kW (1,973 hp) DB603L engines.
- Do 335 A-3: single-seat reconnaissance aircraft built from A-1 aircraft, later proposed with longer wing.
- Do 335 A-4: single-seat reconnaissance aircraft with smaller cameras than the A-3
- Do 335 A-5: single-seat night fighter aircraft, later night and bad weather fighter with enlarged wing and DB603L engines.
- Do 335 A-6: two-seat night fighter aircraft, with completely separate second cockpit located above and behind the original.
- Do 335 A-7: A-6 with longer wing.
- Do 335 A-8: A-4 fitted with longer wing.
- Do 335 A-9: A-4 fitted with longer wing, DB603L engines and pressurized cockpit.
- Do 335 A-10: two seat trainer
- Do 335 A-12: two seat trainer
- Do 335 B-1: abandoned in development.
- Do 335 B-2: single-seat destroyer aircraft. Fitted with 2 additional MK 103 in the wings and provision to carry two standard Luftwaffe 300 litre (80 US gal) drop tanks. Only two prototypes competed and were known as the Do 335 M13 and M14
- Do 335 B-3: updated B-1 but with longer wing.
- Do 335 B-4: update of the B-1 with longer wing, DB603L engine.
- Do 335 B-6: night fighter.
- Do 335 B-12: dual-seat trainer version for the B-series aircraft.
- Do 435: a Do 335 with the redesigned, longer wing. Allied intelligence reports from early May 1945 mention spotting a Do 435 at the Dornier factory airfield at Lowenthal.
- Do 535: actually the He 535, once the Dornier P254 design was handed over to Heinkel in October 1944; fitted with jet engine in place of rear piston engine
- Do 635: twin-fuselaged long-range reconnaissance version. Also called Junkers Ju 8-635 or Do 335Z. Mock up only.
- P 256: turbojet nightfighter version, with two podded HeS 011 turbojet engines, based on Do 335 airframe.

== Surviving aircraft ==
Only one Do 335 survives, the second preproduction Do 335 A-0, designated A-02, with construction number 240 102=. The aircraft was assembled at the Dornier plant in Oberpfaffenhofen, Bavaria on 16 April 1945. It was captured by Allied forces on 22 April. It was one of two Do 335s to be shipped to the United States along with other captured German aircraft, to be used for testing and evaluation under a USAAF program called "Operation Lusty". One Do 335 (registration FE-1012) went to the USAAF and was tested in early 1946 at Freeman Field, Indiana, USA. Its fate is not recorded.

VG+PH went to the Navy for evaluation and was sent to the Test and Evaluation Center, Patuxent River Naval Air Station, Maryland, USA. Following testing from 1945 to 1948, the aircraft languished in outside storage at Naval Air Station Norfolk. In 1961, it was donated to the Smithsonian's National Air Museum, though it remained in deteriorating condition at Norfolk for several more years before being moved to the National Air and Space Museum's storage facility in Suitland, Maryland. In October 1974, VG+PH was returned to the Dornier plant in Oberpfaffenhofen, Germany (then building the Alpha Jet) for a complete restoration. In 1975, the aircraft was restored by Dornier employees, many of whom had worked on the airplane originally. They were surprised that the explosive charges built into the aircraft to blow off the dorsal fin and rear propeller prior to pilot ejection were still intact.

Following restoration, the completed aircraft was displayed at the Hannover Airshow from 1 to 9 May 1976. After the airshow, the aircraft was lent to the Deutsches Museum in Munich, where it was on display until 1988, when it was shipped back to Silver Hill, Maryland. It can be seen today in the Steven F. Udvar-Hazy Center of the National Air and Space Museum alongside other unique late-war German aircraft, including the only known example of the Arado Ar 234 B-2 Blitz jet reconnaissance-bomber, and the only complete surviving Heinkel He 219A Uhu (Eagle-Owl) night fighter.

== Specifications (Do 335 A-1/B-2) ==
Drawing

Data from Dornier Do 335: The Luftwaffe's Fastest Piston-Engine Fighter, Baubeschreibung Do 335 B-0 Zerstörer, 31.05.1944

General characteristics

- Crew: 1
- Length: 13.85 m (45 ft 5 in)
- Wingspan: 13.8 m (45 ft 3 in)
- Height: 5 m (16 ft 5 in)
- Wing area: 38.5 m^{2} (414 sq ft)
- Airfoil: root: NACA 23018-630; tip: NACA 23012-635
- Empty weight: 6,550 kg (14,440 lb)
- Gross weight: 9,600 kg (21,164 lb)

B-2: 10,400 kg (22,900 lb)

- Fuel capacity: 1,230 L (320 US gal; 270 imp gal) main fuel tank (single-seat) with various extra tanks in the weapons bay and wings, depending on variant
- Powerplant: 2 × Daimler-Benz DB 603E-1 V-12 inverted liquid-cooled piston engines, 1,342 kW (1,800 hp) each for take-off and 1,180 kW (1,580 hp) for combat and climb power
- Propellers: 3-bladed VDM, 3.5 and 3.2 m (11 ft 6 in and 10 ft 6 in) diameter constant-speed tractor and pusher propellers

Performance

- Maximum speed: 770 km/h (480 mph, 420 kn) at 8,600 m (28,200 ft) and 608 km/h (378 mph; 328 kn) at sealevel at combat power 2500rpm/1580ps.

B-2: 750 km/h (470 mph; 400 kn) at 8,600 m (28,200 ft) 590 km/h (370 mph; 320 kn) at sealevel at combat power 2500rpm/1580ps

- Cruise speed: 770 km/h (480 mph, 420 kn) at 8,600 m (28,200 ft) at combat power 2500rpm/1580ps
- Economical cruise speed: B-2 485 km/h (301 mph; 262 kn) at 6,000 m (20,000 ft)
- Range: 1,550 km (960 mi, 840 nmi) A-1 on full internal fuel at max cruise power. 1,700 km (1,100 mi; 920 nmi) B-2 at economical cruise power
- Service ceiling: 11,900 m (39,000 ft)
- Time to altitude: 2,000 m (6,600 ft) in 2.5 minutes; 8,000 m (26,000 ft) in 12 minutes

Armament

- Guns: 1 × engine mounted 30 mm (1.18 in) MK 103 cannon with 70 rounds plus 2 × 20 mm (0.79 in) MG 151/20 cowl-mount, synchronized autocannon with 200 rpg.

B-2:1 × engine mounted 30 mm (1.18 in) MK 103 cannon with 70 rounds plus 2 × 20 mm (0.79 in) MG 151/20 cowl-mount, synchronized autocannon with 200 rpg and 2 × wing mounted 30 mm (1.18 in) MK 103 cannon with 140 rounds each

- Bombs: 1 x 500 kg (1,100 lb) or 2 × 250 kg (550 lb) bomb in internal weapons bay and 2 × 250 kg (550 lb) bombs under the wings

== See also ==
Aircraft of comparable role, configuration, and era

- De Havilland Hornet
- Fokker D.XXIII
- Grumman F7F Tigercat
- Kyushu J7W Shinden
- Mansyū Ki-98
- Messerschmitt Me 410 Hornisse
- Tachikawa Ki-94

Related lists

- List of aircraft of World War II
- List of military aircraft of Germany
- List of fighter aircraft
