= Heinkel He 219 Uhu =

German night fighter of World War II

He 219 Uhu
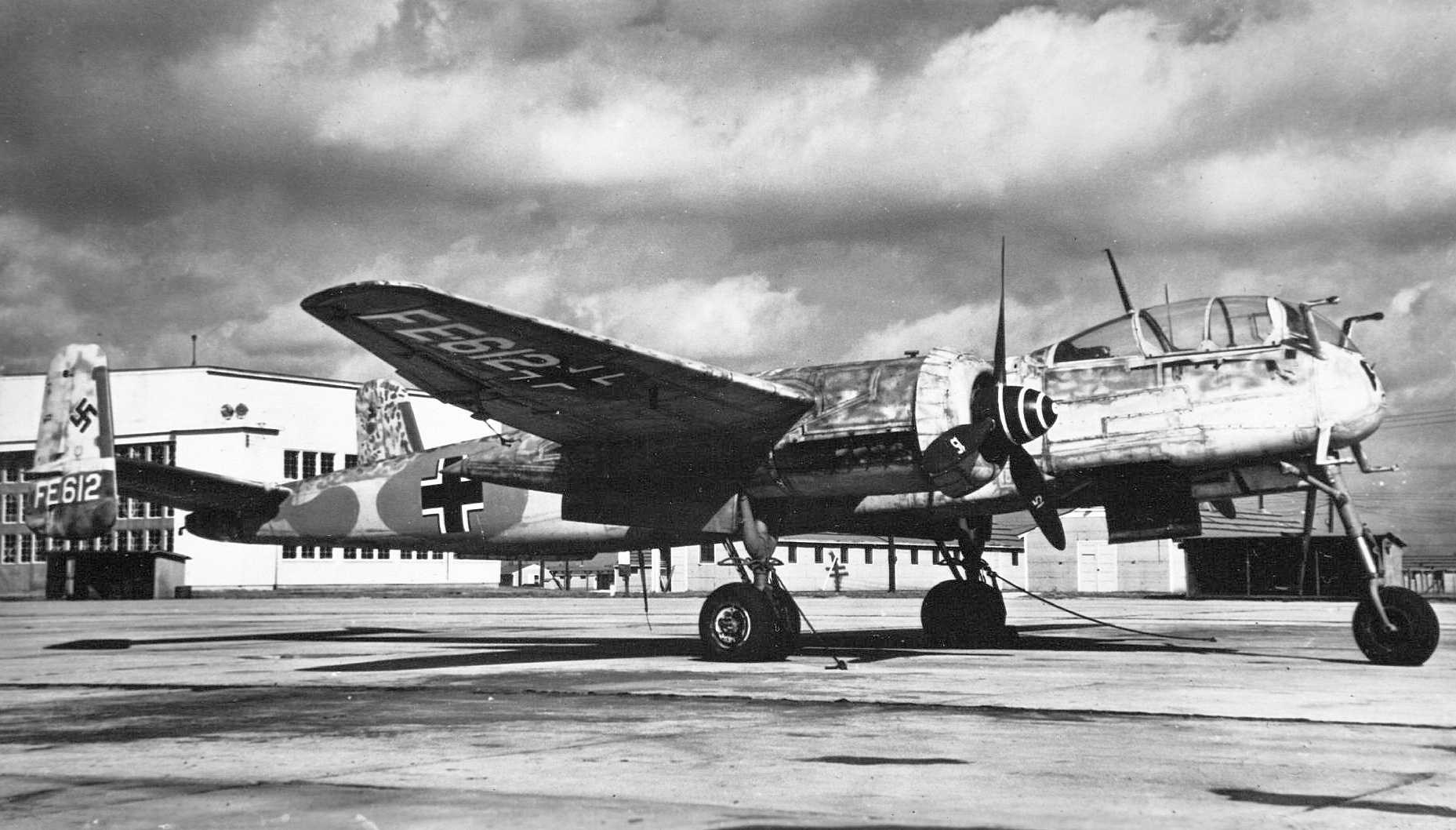

General information
- Type: Night fighter
- National origin: Germany
- Manufacturer: Heinkel
- Status: Retired
- Primary users: Luftwaffe Czechoslovak Air Force
- Number built: 268

History
- Manufactured: 1941–1944
- Introduction date: 1943
- First flight: 6 November 1942
- Developed into: Hütter Hü 211

The Heinkel He 219 Uhu ("Eagle-Owl") is a night fighter designed and produced by the German aircraft manufacturer Heinkel. It primarily served with the Luftwaffe in the later stages of the Second World War.

Work on the He 219 began in mid 1940 as a multi-purpose aircraft designated P.1055. It was a relatively sophisticated design that possessed a variety of innovations, including a pressurized cockpit, twin ejection seats and remotely controlled defensive gun turrets. The P.1055 was initially rejected by the Reichsluftfahrtministerium (RLM – the German Aviation Ministry), but Heinkel promptly reconfigured it as a night fighter, designated P.1060. In this capacity, it was equipped with a Lichtenstein SN-2 advanced VHF-band intercept radar (also used on the Ju 88G and Bf 110G night fighters). The He 219 was also the first operational military aircraft to be equipped with ejection seats and the first operational German aircraft to be equipped with tricycle landing gear. The prototype performed its maiden flight on 6 November 1942.

Both the development and production of the He 219 were protracted due to various factors, including political rivalries between Josef Kammhuber, commander of the German night fighter forces, Ernst Heinkel, the manufacturer and Erhard Milch, responsible for aircraft construction in the RLM. Other aircraft programmes, such as the Junkers Ju 188, Dornier Do 335 and Focke-Wulf Ta 154 Moskito, competed for attention and resources; Milch advocated for these programmes over the He 219. Furthermore, the aircraft was relatively complicated and expensive to build, as were the powerful DB 610 V-12 inline engines that powered it. Nevertheless, the He 219 made its combat debut in June 1943 and was quickly recognised for its value as a night fighter, even being allegedly effective against the Royal Air Force's de Havilland Mosquito fighter-bombers.

In addition to its limited use as a night fighter, Heinkel worked on numerous different models of the He 219, including as a reconnaissance-bomber, high-altitude interceptor, and more advanced fighter. On 25 May 1944, production of the He 219 was officially terminated. Had the He 219 ever become available to the Luftwaffe in large quantities, it is plausible that it could have had a significant effect against the strategic night bombing offensive conducted against Germany by the Royal Air Force (RAF); however, only 268 aircraft across all models were ever completed and thus the type only saw limited service between 1943 and 1945. Ernst-Wilhelm Modrow was the leading night fighter ace on the He 219, having been credited with 33 of his 34 night air victories on the type.

== Design and development ==
=== Background ===
During the summer of 1940, Robert Lusser returned to Heinkel from Messerschmitt and immediately began work on a new high-speed bomber project designated P.1055. This was a shoulder-wing cantilever monoplane; the tailplane, which had considerable dihedral, had twin fins and rudders. The glazed canopy of the cockpit was faired into the nose of the aircraft and provided excellent external visibility for its two occupants, who were seated in an atypical back-to-back configuration. Many parts of the airframe, including its single-spar wing, rectangular-section fuselage and tail surfaces, were made of metal and had a stressed-skin covering.

The P.1055 was originally intended to be a multi-purpose aircraft, and was a relatively advanced design for the era, with a pressurized cockpit, twin ejection seats (the first to be planned for use in any combat aircraft), tricycle landing gear and remotely controlled, side-mounted FDSL 131 defensive gun turrets. Power was to be provided by a pair of DB 610 "power system" engines producing (2,950 PS/2,910 hp) each, delivering a performance with a top speed of approximately 750 km/h (470 mph) and a 4,000 km (2,500 mi) range with a 2,000 kg (4,410 lb) bomb load.

In August 1940, an initial review by the Reichsluftfahrtministerium rejected the P.1055 considering it to be too complex and risky. Lusser quickly offered four versions of the fighter with various wingspans and engine choices in order to balance performance and risk. He also offered the P.1056, a night fighter with four 20 mm cannon in the wings and fuselage. The RLM rejected all of these proposals on the same grounds in 1941. Heinkel was furious and fired Lusser on the spot.

About the same time as Lusser was designing the P.1055, Kammhuber had started looking for an aircraft for his rapidly growing night fighter force. Heinkel quickly re-designed the P.1055 for this role as the P.1060. This was similar in layout but somewhat smaller and powered by two DB 603 inverted V12 engines. As designed by Heinkel, these engines' nacelles had annular radiators. The early DB 603 subtypes had poor altitude performance, which was a problem for Heinkel's short-winged design, but Daimler had a new "G" subtype of the DB 603 powerplant meant to produce 1,400 kW (1,900 PS) take-off power apiece under development to remedy the problem. Heinkel was sure he had a winner and sent the design off to the RLM in January 1942, while he funded the first prototype himself. The RLM again rejected the He 219, in favour of new Ju 88- and Me 210-based designs.

=== Prototypes ===
Construction of the prototype was started in February 1942; however, one month later, work was set back when Daimler reported that the intended DB 603G engine would not be ready in time and an alternative engine arrangement was necessary. Even then, DB 603 engines did not arrive until August 1942, and the prototype didn't make its maiden flight until 6 November 1942. When Kammhuber saw the prototype on 19 November, he was so impressed that he immediately ordered it into production over Milch's objections. Milch, who had rejected the He 219 in January, was enraged.

During early January 1943, a series of competitive trials were flown between the second prototype of the He 219 and the Junkers Ju 188; these were inconclusive. One problem was that the He 219 possessed less stability than desired; to overcome this, Heinkel offered a cash prize to engineers to develop corrective measures. In March 1943, a more comprehensive series of tests were conducted in which the He 219 proved to be superior to both the Ju 188 and the Dornier Do 217. The same month, the He 219 programme was dealt a major blow when Heinkel's works at Rostock were struck by an RAF bombing raid which, amongst other things, destroyed three-quarters of the drawings; soon afterwards, the design office was transferred to Vienna.

During the development process several changes were made to the armament. The dorsal rear defensive guns mounted on top of the fuselage and firing directly rearward were removed due to their tendency to become detached from the fuselage when fired. The forward-firing armament was increased to two Mauser MG 151/20 20 mm autocannon in the wing roots, inboard of the propeller arcs and four more MG 151/20 autocannon mounted in the ventral fuselage tray. The A-0 model had a bulletproof shield which could be raised in the front cockpit, protecting the bottom portion of the windscreen. Production prototypes were then ordered as the He 219 A-0 and quickly progressed to the point where V7, V8 and V9 were handed over to operational units in June 1943 for testing.

The earlier prototypes, with four-blade propellers had blunt, compound-curvature noses, as used for production-series aircraft. The early examples of these had cutouts for the forward-projecting masts of the Matratze radar antennae of at least the first five prototypes, used with the early UHF-band Lichtenstein B/C or C-1 radar installation. These early He 219V-series prototypes also had cockpit canopies that did not smoothly taper on their upper surface, as on the later production aircraft, but instead ended in a nearly hemispherical enclosure. In December 1943, Milch pushed for the He 219 programme to be cancelled in favour of the Junkers Ju 88G on the basis that the performance of the Ju 88G was sufficient to handle Allied bombers and that increasing production of the He 219 would disrupt manufacturing efforts. Milch also proposed that the Dornier Do 335 be favoured over the He 219. Milch repeatedly sought to have the programme cancelled; these efforts reportedly led to Kammhuber being removed from office. On 25 May 1944, production of the He 219 was officially ended after Milch persuaded RLM officials to redirect resources to the Junkers Ju 388 and Focke-Wulf Ta 154 Moskito programmes. Despite the programme being officially terminated, Heinkel continued low-rate production of the He 219.

== Operational history ==
The He 219 had an auspicious combat debut. On the night of 11–12 June 1943, Werner Streib flew the V9 and shot down five bombers between 01:05 and 02:22 hours, before crashing on landing. Claims have been made that, "In the next ten days the three Heinkel He 219A-0 pre-production aircraft [shot] down a total of 20 RAF aircraft, including six of the previously "untouchable" de Havilland Mosquito fighter-bombers. Greatly encouraged, Kammhuber continued to press for immediate production." No record of corresponding Mosquito losses or any documentary evidence exists that He 219 pilots claimed six Mosquitos. In the opinion of the accomplished test pilot Capt. Eric Brown - who flew several He 219 A-2s after the conflict - the He 219 was "decidedly underpowered" (his italics) and the "rate of climb was certainly unimpressive" and found it to be "short on performance to deal with the Mosquito".

The first model to be produced in quantity was the He 219 A-0, although initially the pre-production series, it matured into a long running production series, due to numerous changes incorporated into the design, along with the cancellation of several planned variants. As a result of production difficulties, the A-0 did not reach Luftwaffe units until October 1943. The A-0 was typically armed with a pair of 20 mm MG 151/20 cannon in the wing roots and up to four 20 mm or 30 mm cannon in a ventral weapons bay. The first 10–15 aircraft were delivered with the 490 MHz UHF-band FuG 212 "Lichtenstein" C-1 radar with a 4 × 8-dipole element Matratze antenna array. In total, 104 He 219 A-0s were built until the summer of 1944, the majority of them at EHW (Ernst Heinkel Wien) or Heinkel-Süd in Wien-Schwechat.

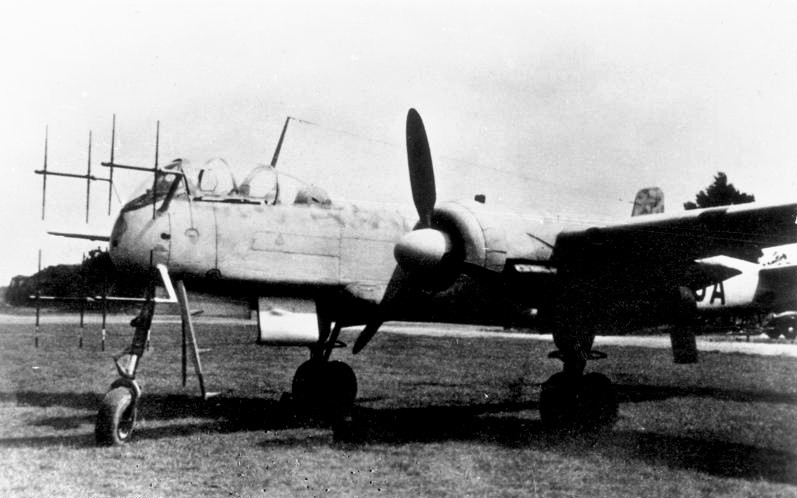
A production He 219A with Hirschgeweih VHF radar antennas

The first planned version to reach production was the He 219 A-2 model, which had longer engine nacelles containing extra fuel tanks, unitized 1670 PS DB 603AA engines with higher critical altitude and often also two 30 mm (1.18 in) MK 108 cannon, as an offensive Schräge Musik upward-firing system completely contained within the rear fuselage, with the cannons' muzzles even with the dorsal fuselage surface. With Schräge Musik, the ventral weapons bay held two cannon due to space limitations. The A-2 featured an updated, 90 MHz VHF-band Telefunken FuG 220 Lichtenstein SN-2 radar system, complete with its larger, high-drag 4 × 2-dipole element Hirschgeweih aerials. It initially had a longer minimum range than the C-1 radar, but had improved accuracy and resolution and was also less vulnerable to chaff jamming. Through the late summer of 1944, a total of 85 He 219 A-2s were built until November 1944, most at EHR (Ernst Heinkel Rostock) or Heinkel-Nord in Rostock-Marienehe (now Rostock-Schmarl).

The He 219 was a capable fighter aircraft and the pilots were free to hunt down any detected Allied bombers. Typically, ground control would dispatch aircraft into the right area, at which point the pilots took over and guided themselves towards the bombers using information from their onboard Lichtenstein VHF radar. The SN-2 radar's 4 km (3 mi) maximum detection range was greater than the distance between the bombers. While the performance of the A-2 was not extraordinary—approximately 580 km/h (360 mph) speed—it was enough of an advance over the Messerschmitt Bf 110Gs and Dornier Do 217Ns for the crew to chase several bombers in a single sortie. The He 219 was typically well received by personnel; ground crews benefited from its high level of accessibility for maintenance work. Furthermore, the inclusion of an ejector seat was credited with saving the lives of numerous air crew. Pilots also favoured its weapons placement.

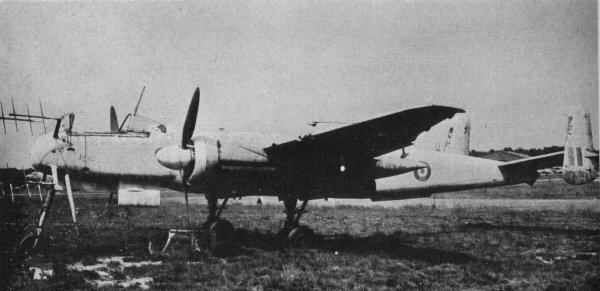
Captured He 219 in British markings in 1945. The aircraft is missing its cockpit canopy

In order to improve its ability to intercept the Mosquito, one model of the He 219 was intentionally stripped to minimise its weight. Following the removal of some armaments and radio apparatus, the aircraft was able to attain a speed of 650 km/h (404 mph); this version was given the designation A-6. None of these were produced, but similar weight saving measures could be undertaken at the unit level. The He 219 was the only piston-engined night fighter capable of combat with the Mosquito on equal terms, given its speed, manoeuvrability and firepower, however, it was never able to play a significant role in the conflict because Germany's industrial base failed to produce it in sufficient numbers.

The last major production version was the A-7 with improved, unitized DB 603E engines. The A-7 typically had two 20 mm MG 151/20 cannon in the wing roots (inboard of the propeller arcs), two 20 mm MG 151/20 in the ventral weapons bay and two 30 mm (1.18 in) MK 108s as rear-fuselage dorsal mount, upwards-firing Schräge Musik offensive ordnance. Production of 210 aircraft was to start November/December 1944, but the number produced is not known as original documents have been lost or contained no sub-version number.

=== Further developments ===
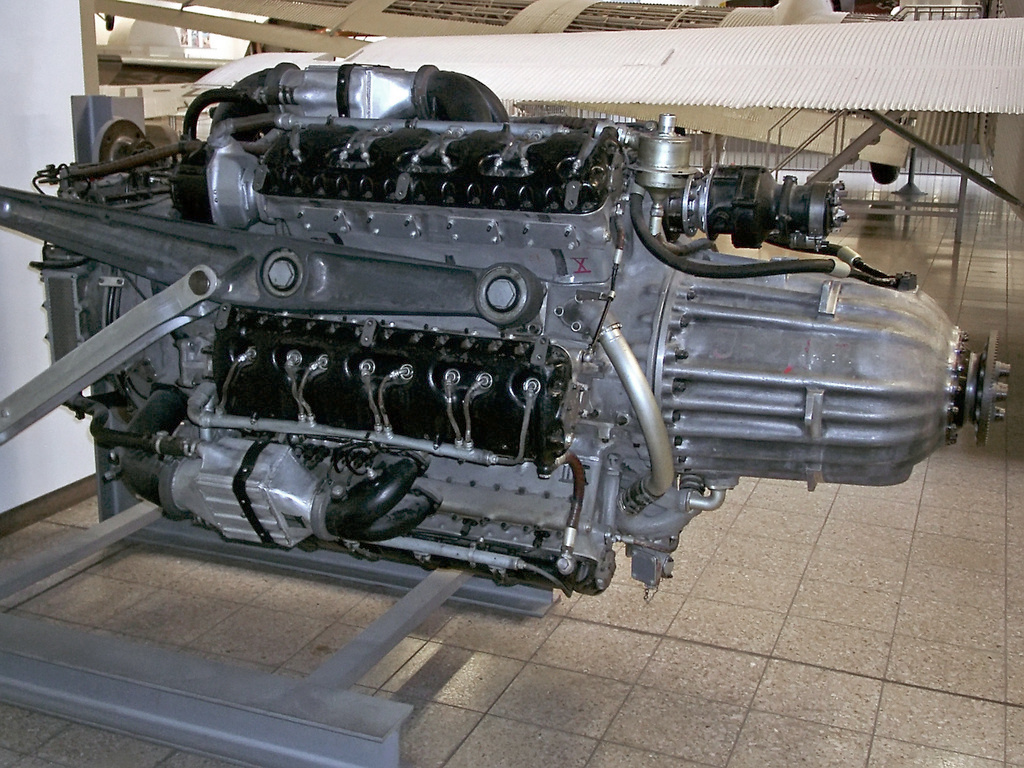
The troublesome Jumo 222 multibank engine, meant for the He 219B and -C subtypes

The follow-on series to the He 219As in service was to be the He 219B fitted with the new 1,864 kW (2,500 hp) Junkers Jumo 222A/B 24-cylinder engines which would have allowed the He 219 to reach 700 km/h (440 mph). The He 219B was also to have had an increased span of 22.06 m (72.38 ft), for better high altitude performance. The Jumo 222 did not reach production status, with just under 300 examples built in at least three differing displacement sizes. Only a few test machines were ever fitted with the engines; some additional airframes were built with the enlarged wing. These examples were intended to fly with high-altitude versions of the standard DB 603 powerplants in place of the Jumo 222 multibank powerplants, but only one or two test machines ever flew with them.

A further adaptation would have been the He 219C, also intended to use the B-series design's big wing and Jumo 222 powerplants as well as an all-new fuselage of 17.15 m (56.27 ft), with a complete three-man Ju 388J cockpit section forward, converted to accept the He 219A's standard nose gear layout the Borsig-designed Hecklafette HL 131V "quadmount", hydraulic-powered four-gun manned tail turret intended for later He 177A versions and the He 177B-5, as well as more than one Amerikabomber strategic bomber design competitor. Day bomber and night fighter versions were proposed and metal was cut for the project but since the 1,500-kW Jumo 222 engines remained experimental they never flew.

Paper projects include the very-high-altitude He 219E with a vastly increased wingspan of 28.5 m (93.5 ft) and 1,500 kW (2,000 PS) output rated DB 614 engines, which were apparently a further-uprated version of the never-produced DB 603G inverted V12, capable of the desired 1,491 kW (2,000 hp) power output level that Germany were unable to develop into a reliable powerplant.

A more reasonable project was the Hütter Hü 211, a design by Wolfgang Hütter that took a standard He 219 fuselage and tail and added a long-span, high aspect ratio wing of 24.55 m (80.54 ft) to create a fast, high altitude interceptor. Since this design was also meant to be powered by the ill-fated Jumo 222 it never flew, although work continued on two sets of wings until they were destroyed by Allied bombing.

== Variants ==
He 219 A-0
Initially used for pre-production aircraft but became first major production version with 1,750 PS DB 603A engines, 104 built as of 30 November 1944,
He 219 A-1
Proposed reconnaissance-bomber aircraft; project abandoned
He 219 A-2
Similar to A-0 but extended engine nacelles with additional fuel tanks, 1,670 PS DB 603AA engines, 85 built as of 30 November 1944
He 219 A-5
Planned three-seat night fighter, only some prototypes known to have been built from A-2 airframes
He 219 A-6
Planned Mosquito-hunter, stripped-down version of the He 219 A-2, armed with four 20 mm MG 151/20s
He 219 A-7
Improved night fighter version, powered by two 1,800 PS DB 603E engines, 210 ordered as of 30 November 1944
He 219 D-1
He 219 A-7 airframes adapted for Jumo 213E engines, five known to be delivered in 1945
He 319
An unbuilt multi-role aircraft project entirely unrelated to the He 219; only having the number sequence in common
He 419
Various derived projects culminating in He 419 B-1/R1, six of which were flown; use of the He 319 tail, very long-span wing of 59 square metres (635 sq ft), two 20 mm MG 151/20 in the wings and four 30 mm MK 108 in ventral housing. Speed of 679 km/h (422 mph) to 13,600 m (44,600 ft).
Letov LB-79
Two He 219s built from recovered components in Czechoslovakia during 1950, with one being used as a jet engine test-bed.

== Operators ==
Czechoslovakia

- Czechoslovak Air Force (Postwar)

Germany

- Luftwaffe

== Surviving aircraft ==
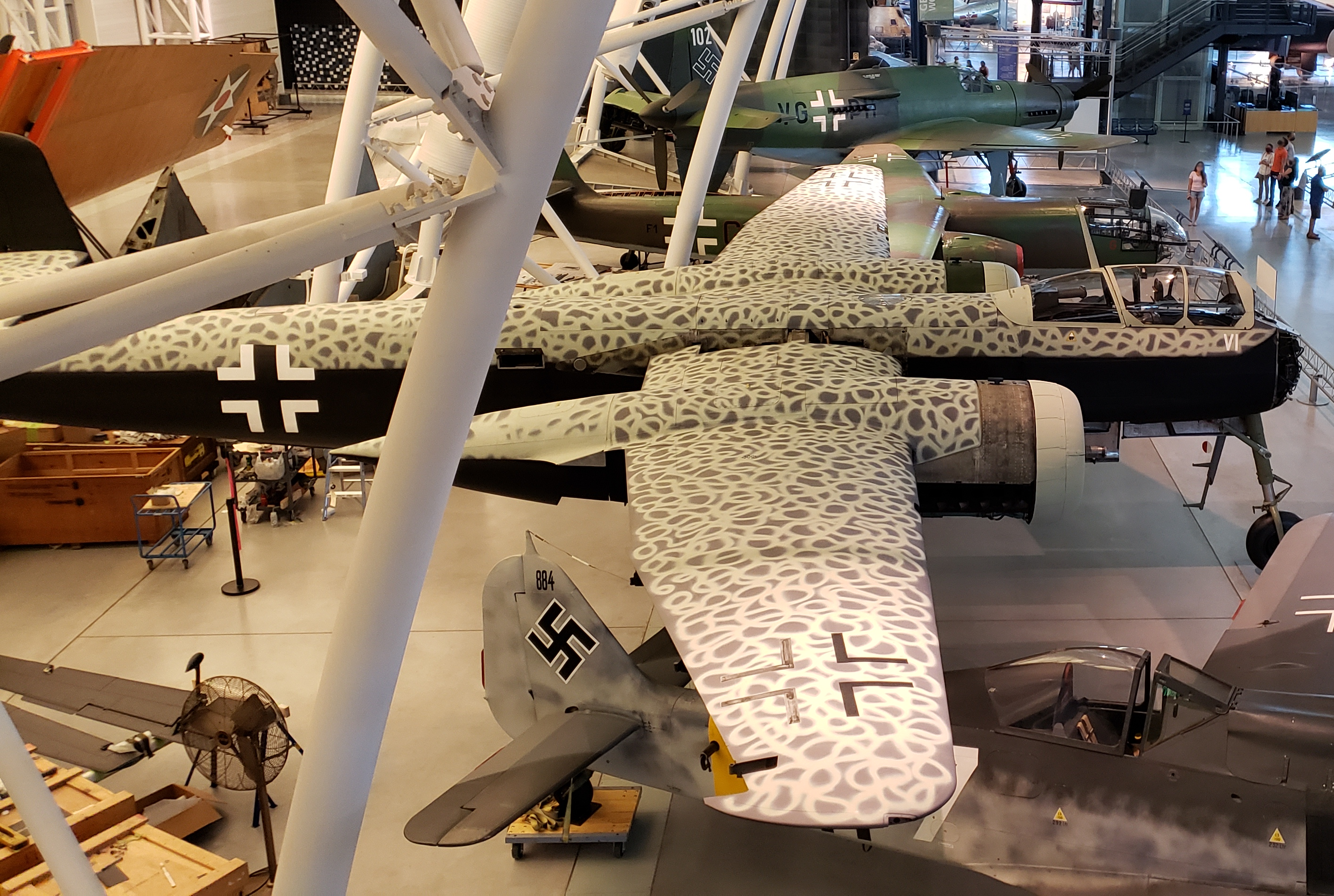
Heinkel He 219 at the Steven F. Udvar-Hazy Center. 22 May 2021

When the war had ended in Europe, the U.S. Army Air Forces Intelligence Service, as part of "Operation LUSTY" (Luftwaffe Secret Technology), took control of three He 219s at the Grove base of the 1st Night Fighter Wing (Nachtjagdgeschwader 1) in Jutland, Denmark starting on 16 June 1945. These aircraft were made flight-worthy by "Watson's Whizzers" and flown to Cherbourg, France. He 219 A-2 Werknummer 290202 was shipped to the United States with 21 other captured German aircraft on board the British escort carrier HMS Reaper, and was reassembled at Newark Army Air Field, Newark, New Jersey.

By August 2014, the wing structure (without control surfaces fitted) had been essentially restored, and was ready for the trip to the NASM's Steven F. Udvar-Hazy Center shops within its integral Mary Baker Engen Restoration Hangar, to join the fuselage and engine nacelles there, with replacement Hirschgeweih VHF-band radar antenna components to be fabricated, based on a preserved example located in Europe and loaned to the NASM for replication, as part of the ongoing restoration process. The repainted wings were displayed during the 30 January 2016 open house in the restoration hangar paint shack.

He 219 A-2 Werknummer 290202 is currently restored and on display at the Steven F. Udvar-Hazy Center by Dulles Airport. Previously only the fuselage, empennage, and engines were on display, while the wings were stored at the Paul Garber Facility in Silver Hill, Maryland. As of 2021 the restored and assembled aircraft, including its wings, nacelles (possibly as Heinkel-designed specific, Kraftei unitized powerplant installations), and partially restored DB 603 engines (missing propellers) can be seen displayed next the museum's Arado Ar 234 and Dornier Do 335, the only surviving examples of those aircraft, both of which accompanied WkNr. 290202 across the Atlantic over 60 years ago.

In April 2012, a previously unknown He 219 was salvaged from the sea bed, 100 meters from the beach, north of Hirtshals, Denmark. The remains are in several pieces, but will undergo restoration and eventually be displayed at Aalborg, Denmark. Although severely damaged and missing many parts, the remains of this aircraft was preserved and then put on display at the Forsvars- og Garnisonsmuseum in Aalborg, Denmark. In August 2015 it was announced that the wreckage had been sold to an Austrian enthusiast for further restoration.

== Specifications (He 219 A-7) ==
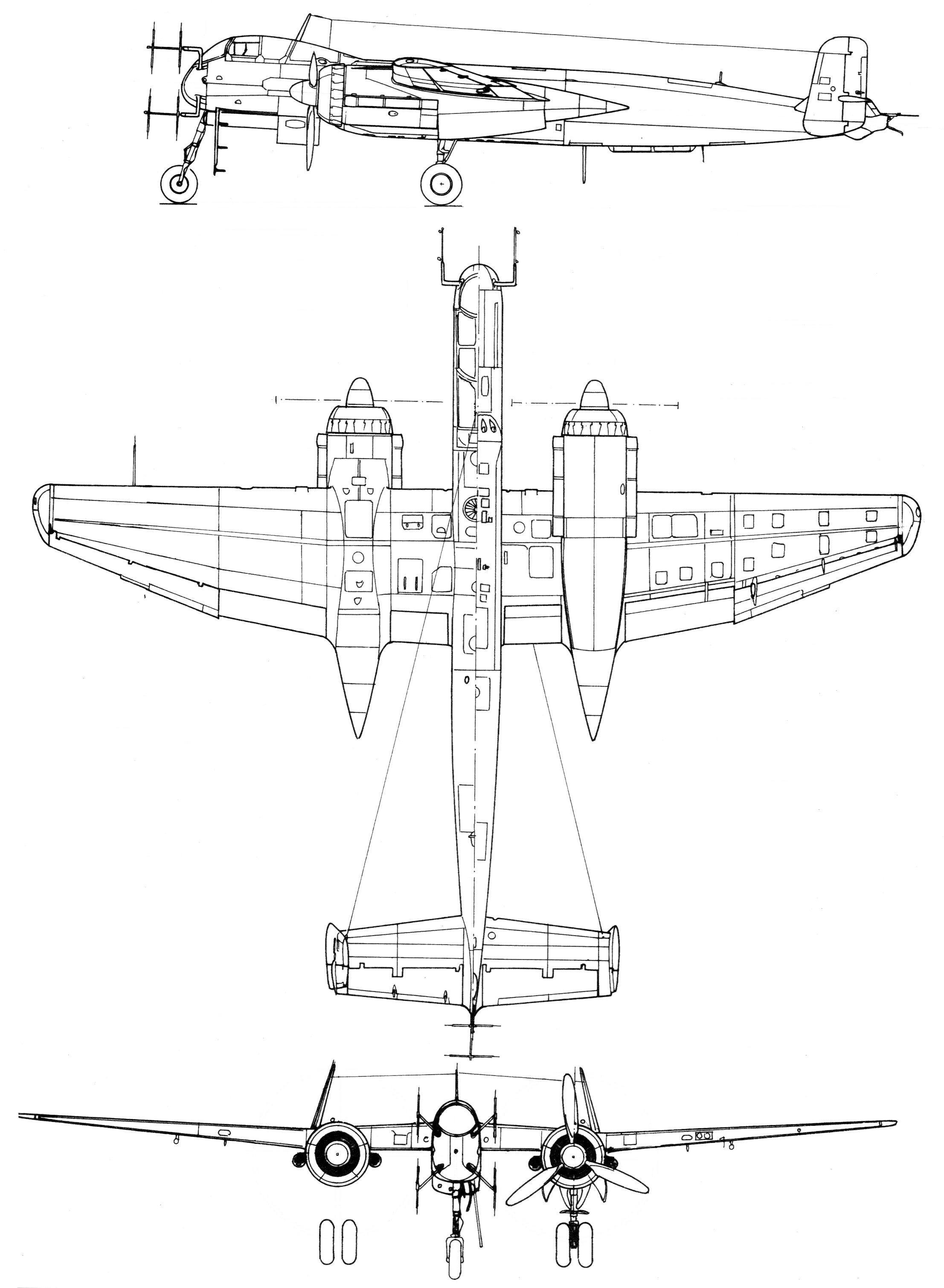
3-view drawing of Heinkel He 219A-7/R1

Data from German aircraft of the Second World War, Jane's Fighting Aircraft of World War II, Die Deutsche Luftrüstung 1933–1945 Vol.2 – Flugzeugtypen Erla-Heinkel

General characteristics

- Crew: 2
- Length: 15.33 m (50 ft 4 in)
- Wingspan: 18.5 m (60 ft 8 in)
- Height: 4.1 m (13 ft 5 in)
- Wing area: 44.5 m^{2} (479 sq ft)
- Airfoil: root: He 2 37 16.8–0.715–36.6; tip: He 2 37 12-0.715–36.6
- Empty weight: 11,200 kg (24,692 lb)
- Gross weight: 15,300 kg (33,731 lb)
- Powerplant: 2 × Daimler-Benz DB 603E V-12 inverted liquid-cooled piston engines, 1,324 kW (1,776 hp) each
- Propellers: 3-bladed VDM constant-speed propeller

Performance

- Maximum speed: 670 km/h (420 mph, 360 kn) at 7,000 m (23,000 ft)
- Cruise speed: 540 km/h (340 mph, 290 kn)
- Range: 1,545 km (960 mi, 834 nmi)
- Ferry range: 2,000 km (1,200 mi, 1,100 nmi)
- Service ceiling: 12,700 m (41,700 ft) (absolute)

Armament

- Guns: ** 2 × 20 mm (0.787 in) MG 151/20 cannon in a detachable fairing under the fuselage, 300 rpg
  - 2 × 20 mm (0.787 in) MG 151/20 cannon in wing roots, 300 rpg
  - 2 × 30 mm (1.181 in) MK 108 cannon, Schräge Musik (oriented 65° above horizontal), 100 rpg

== See also ==
Aircraft of comparable role, configuration, and era

- Bristol Beaufighter Mk I/Mk VI
- Caproni Ca.331
- de Havilland Mosquito
- Focke-Wulf Ta 154
- Junkers Ju 88C/G/R
- Kawasaki Ki-45 KAId
- Mitsubishi Ki-46 III-KAI
- Messerschmitt Bf 110F-4/G-4
- Nakajima J1N
- Northrop P-61 Black Widow
- Petlyakov Pe-3

Related lists

- List of military aircraft of Germany
- List of aircraft of World War II
