= Daimler-Benz DB 603 =

German aircraft engine

DB 603
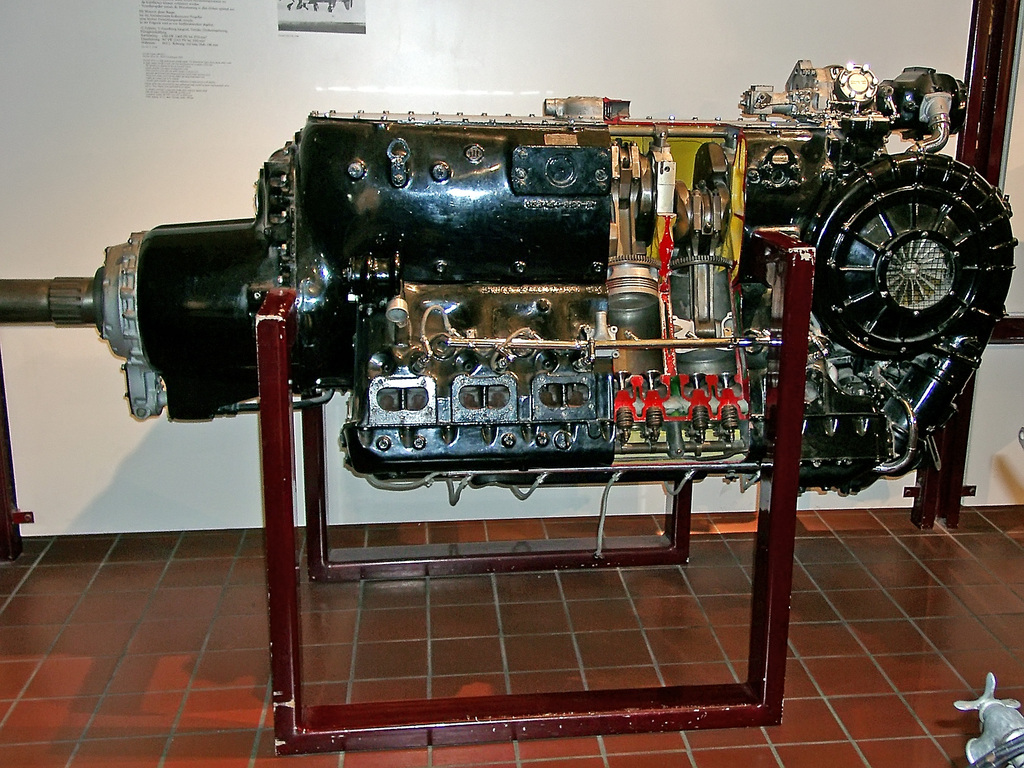
- Preserved Daimler-Benz DB 603E with cutaway sections.
- Type: Piston V12 aircraft engine
- National origin: Germany
- Manufacturer: Daimler-Benz
- First run: 1939
- Major applications: Blohm & Voss BV 238; Dornier Do 217; Dornier Do 335; Heinkel He 219; Messerschmitt Me 410
- Developed from: Daimler-Benz DB 601

The Daimler-Benz DB 603 was a German aircraft engine used during World War II. It was a liquid-cooled 12-cylinder inverted V12 enlargement of the 33.9 Liter DB 601, which was in itself a development of the DB 600. Production of the DB 603 commenced in May 1942, and with a 44.5 liter (44,500 cc) displacement, was the largest displacement inverted V12 aircraft engine to be used in front line aircraft of the Third Reich during World War II.

The DB 603 powered several aircraft, including the Do 217 N&M, Do 335, He 219, Me 410, BV 155 and Ta 152C.

== Design and development ==
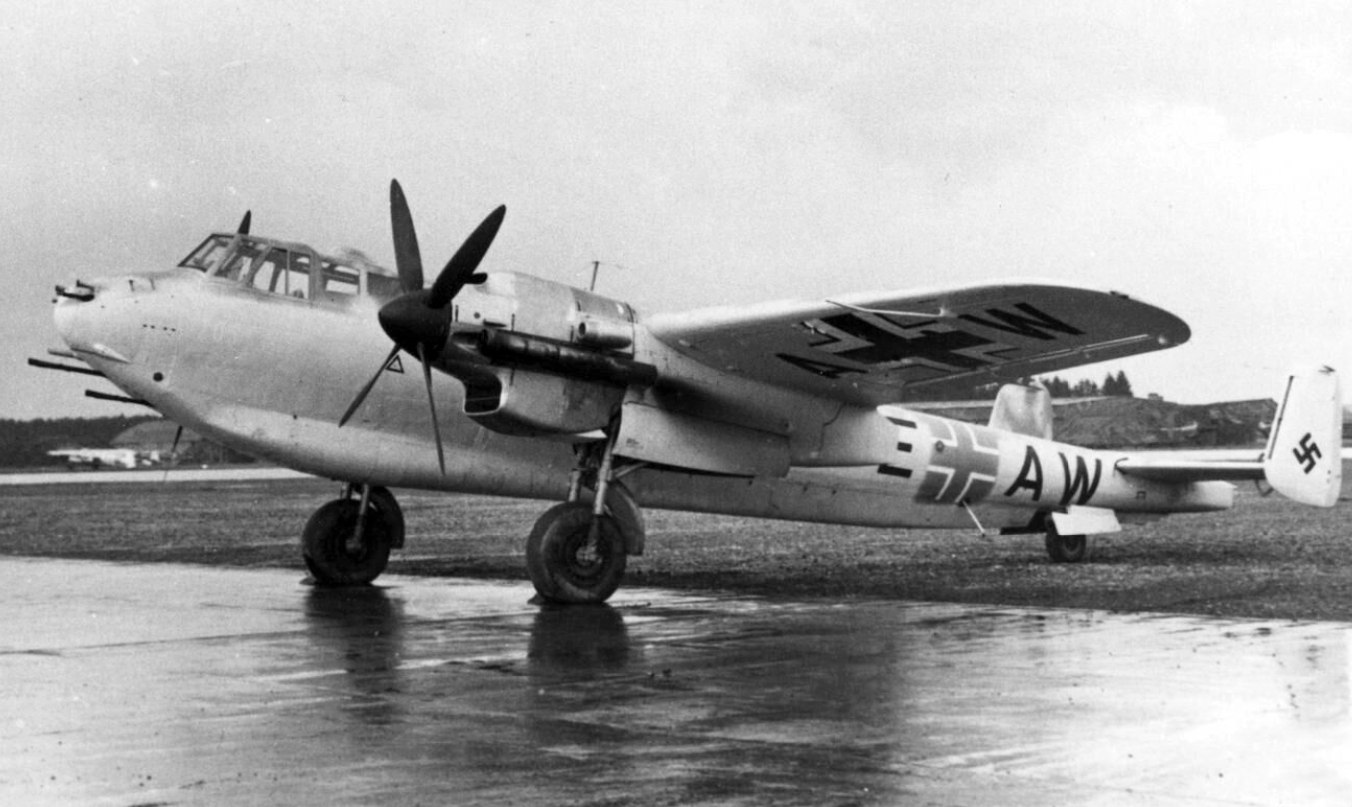
A Do 217N night fighter with Kraftei-format DB 603s fitted

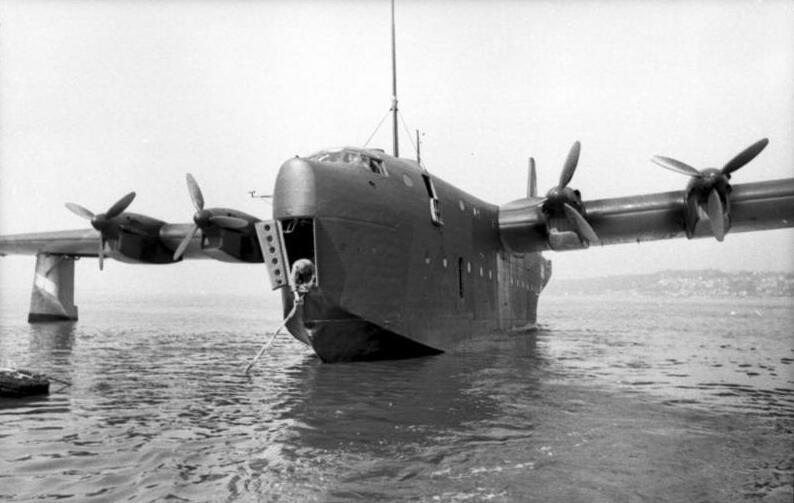
BV 238 V1 flying boat with Kraftei DB 603s, similar to Do 217s

As Germany's largest displacement inverted V12 aviation powerplant in production during the war years, the DB 603 saw wide operational use as the primary engine type for many twin and multi-engined combat aircraft designs — the promising twin-engined Dornier Do 335 Pfeil prototype heavy fighter, the front-line Messerschmitt Me 410 Hornisse heavy fighter and Heinkel He 219 Uhu twin-engined night fighter were all designed to be powered by the DB 603.

The Dornier Do 217M and -N medium bomber and night fighter subtypes powered by inline engines, and the enormous sixty-metre wingspan, six-engined Blohm & Voss BV 238 flying boat prototype, essentially had their DB 603 powerplants installed within what appeared to be the same unitized complete engine/cowl/radiator assembly as a complete unit-replaceable "power system" for twin and multi-engined aircraft — this particular design featured a "chin"-style radiator installation directly beneath the crankcase, and the oil cooler placed on the dorsal portion of the installation for the earlier examples, as the BV 238 had no visible upper-cowl openings for engine cooling of any sort for its half-dozen unitized DB 603s.

The He 219 airframe pioneered what is believed to be a Heinkel-specific Kraftei unitized engine package for the DB 603 engine using a well-streamlined annular radiator set for primary engine cooling between the propeller and its reduction gear housing with a nearly-cylindrical cowl behind it, pierced only by the twin rows of six exhaust stacks, one row per side. The characteristic portside-cowl supercharger intake for Daimler-Benz inverted V12s was usually accommodated away from the nacelle's sheetmetal itself for the Heinkel/DB 603 unitized engine package, most often within the airframe's wing panel design. The same Kraftei packaging for the He 219 was also used for powering the four-engined prototype He 177B strategic bomber series, and with an added turbocharger in each nacelle, the six ordered (two completed) prototypes of Heinkel's He 274 high-altitude strategic bomber project.

The Mercedes-Benz T80 land speed record car, designed by aircraft engineer Josef Mickl with assistance from Ferdinand Porsche and top German Grand Prix racing driver Hans Stuck, incorporated the third prototype DB 603. It was set up for the land speed record run attempt to operate on an exotic fuel mix based on a 63% methanol, 16% benzene and 12% ethanol content, with minor percentages of acetone, nitrobenzene, avgas and ether. Adding to the power output was a pioneering form of the Luftwaffe's later MW 50 methanol/water injection boost, and was tuned to 3,000 PS (2,959 hp, 2,207 kW)— enough, it was believed, to propel the aerodynamic three-axle T80 up to 750 km/h (466 mph) on a specially-prepared, nearly 10 km (6.2 mi) length stretch of the roughly north–south oriented Autobahn Berlin — Halle/Leipzig, which passed close to the east side of Dessau (now part of the modern A9 Autobahn) and with the actual length's location due south of Dessau, reworked to be 25 m (82 ft) wide with a paved-over median, for the record to be set in January 1940 during Rekord Woche (Record/Speed Week). Due to the outbreak of the war in September 1939, the T80 (nicknamed Schwarzer Vogel, "Black Bird") never raced. The DB 603 engine was removed from the vehicle for use in fighter aircraft.

== Variants ==
=== Production versions ===
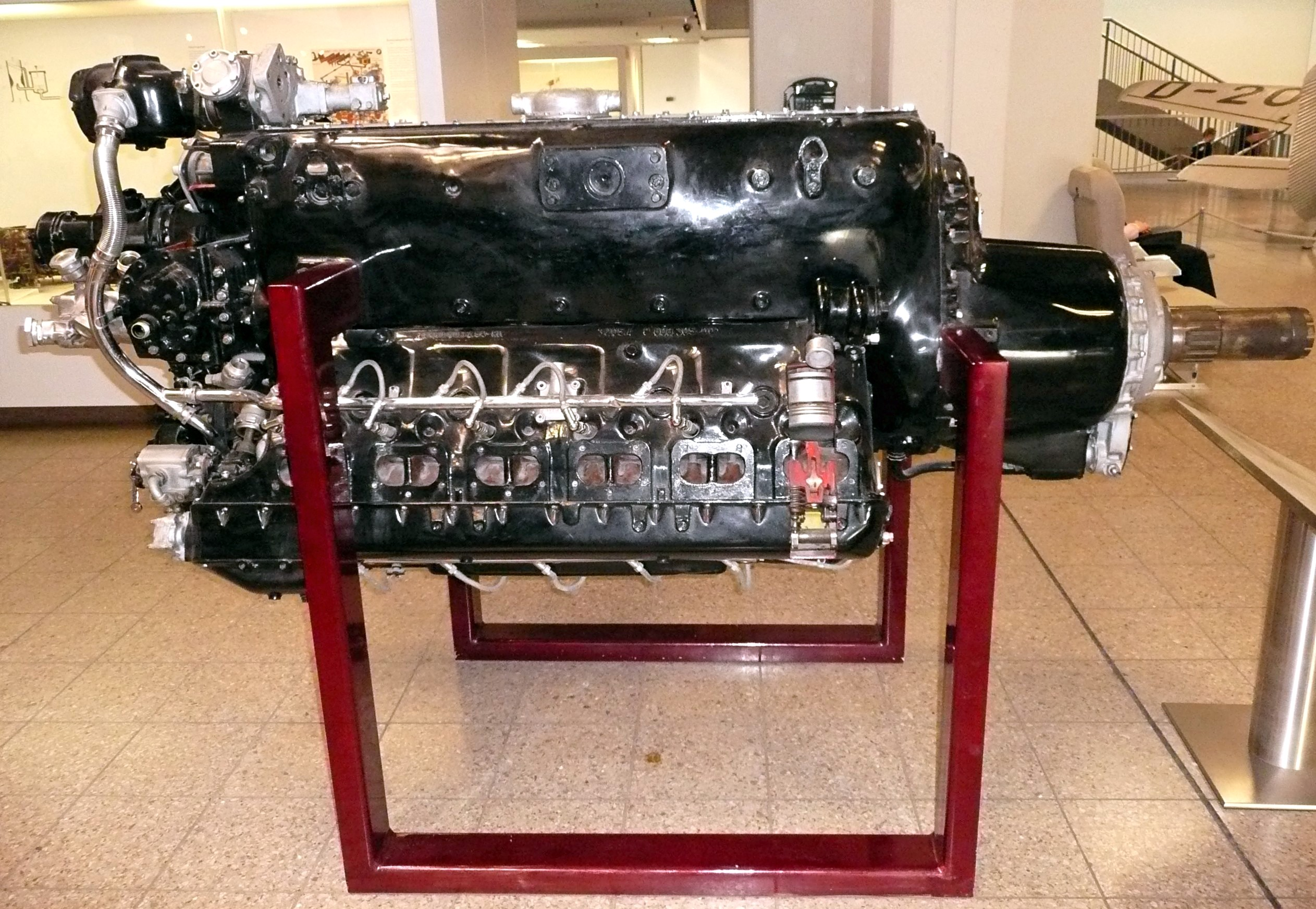
DB 603E built in 1944, right-hand side view

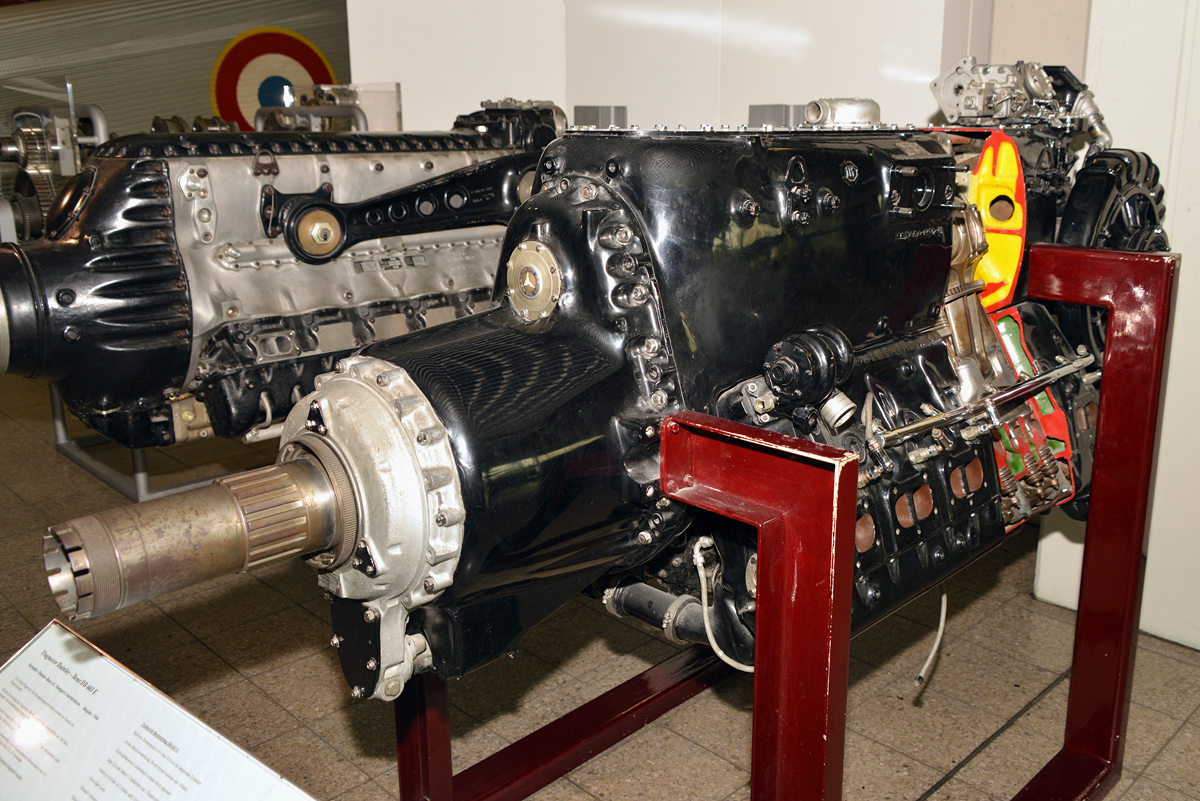
DB 603E at Deutsches Museum, Munich

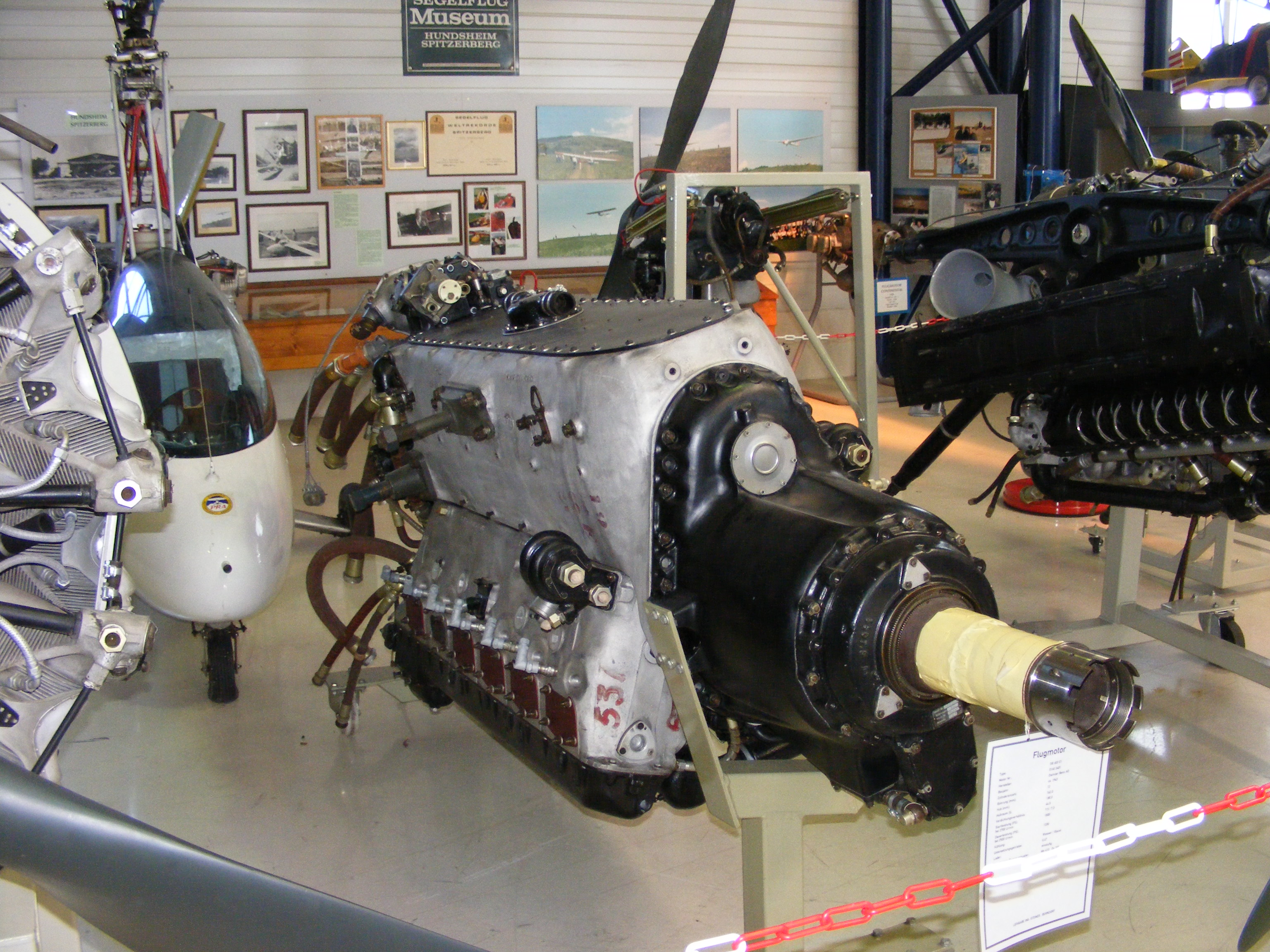
DB 603 E1 at Aviaticum Museum, Wiener Neustadt

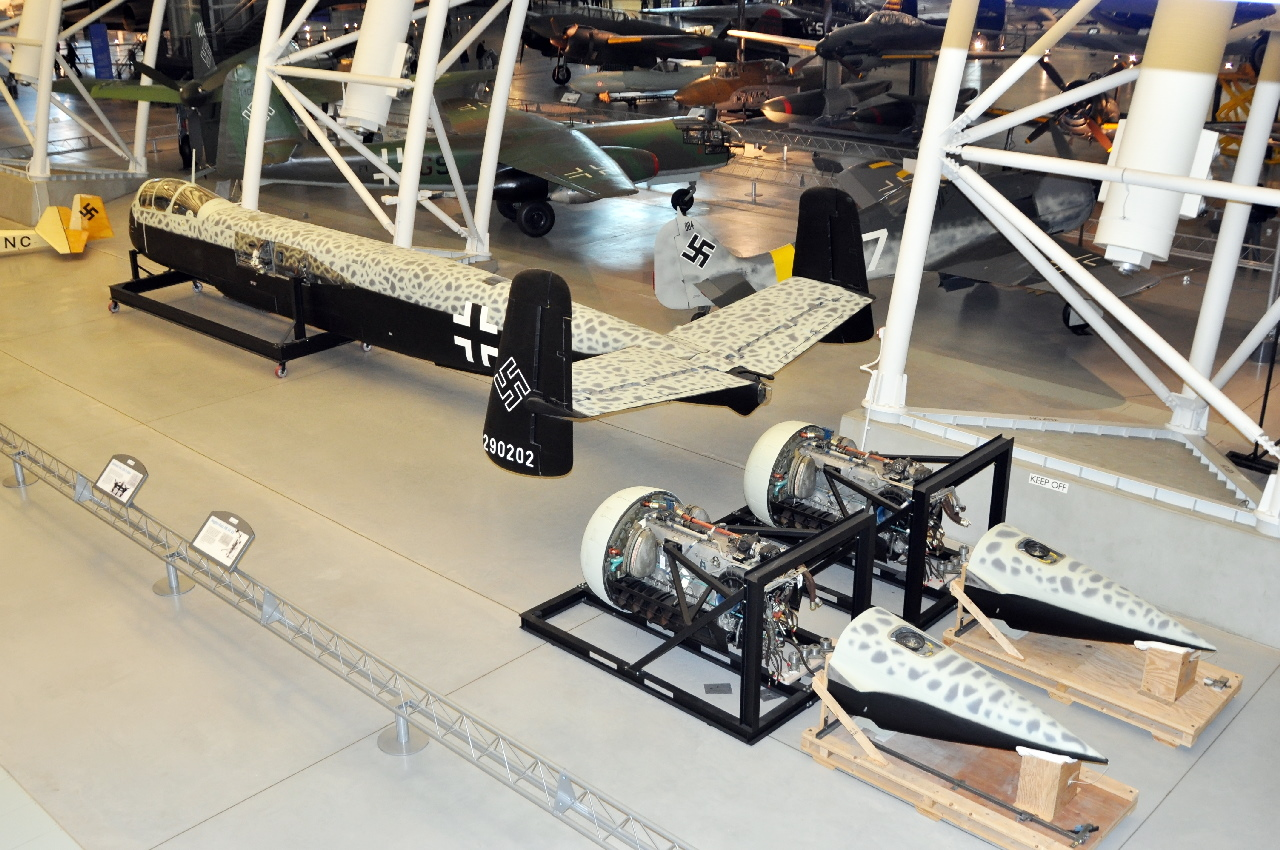
The NASM's He 219 fuselage, with its Heinkel-specific DB 603 Kraftei unitized engines to lower right

- DB 603A, rated altitude of 5.7 km, B4 fuel

Power (take-off): 1750 PS (1726 hp, 1287 kW) at 2700 rpm at sea level
Combat power: 1580 PS (1558 hp, 1162 kW) at 2500 rpm at sea level

- DB 603AA DB 603A with an improved supercharger, rated altitude of 7.3 km, B4 fuel

Power (take-off): 1670 PS (1647 hp, 1228 kW) at 2700 rpm at sea level
Combat power: 1580 PS (1558 hp, 1162 kW) at 2500 rpm at sea level

- DB 603E rated altitude of 7.0 km, B4 fuel

Power (take-off): 1800 PS (1775 hp, 1324 kW) at 2700 rpm at sea level
Combat power: 1575 PS (1553 hp, 1158 kW) at 2500 rpm at sea level

=== Prototypes and other versions ===
- DB 603D, a DB 603A with propellers rotating counter-clockwise; production unknown
- DB 603F, a DB 603E with propellers rotating counter-clockwise; production unknown
- DB 603G (production cancelled)

Power (max): 1900 PS (1874 hp, 1397 kW) at 2700 rpm at sea level
Combat power: 1560 PS (1539 hp, 1147 kW) at 2700 rpm at sea level

- DB 603L/LA (prototype with two-stage supercharger, B4 fuel)

Power (max): 2000 PS (1973 hp, 1471 kW)

- DB 603L/M two-stage supercharger, rated altitude of 10.5 km, C3 fuel

Power (take-off): 2450 PS (2416 hp, 1801 kW) at 3000 rpm at sea level
Combat power: 2100 PS (2071 hp, 1544 kW) at 2700 rpm at sea level

- DB 603N (prototype with two-stage supercharger, C3 fuel)

Power (take-off): 3000PS (2958 hp, 2206 kW) at 3200 rpm at sea level
Power (max): 2570 PS (2762 hp, 2059 kW) at 3000 rpm at sea level
Continuous: 1930 PS (1904 hp, 1420 kW) at 2700 rpm at sea level

- DB 603S (DB 603A with experimental TK-11 turbo-supercharger) - Intended (not known if actually used) for the Heinkel He 274 prototype airframes.

Power (max): Not known.

- DB 613 Coupled side-by-side DB 603s, meant to replace the DB 606 and DB 610, in prototype form only from March 1940 through 1943 and weighing an estimated 1.8 tonnes apiece.

Power (max): Estimated at some 3,854 PS (2,833 kW, 3,800 hp) each per "power system".

- DB 614 a 2000 PS development.
- DB 615 Coupled DB 614 engines
- DB 617 A long-range derivative of the DB 603
- DB 618 Coupled DB 617 engines
- DB 622 A DB 603 with a two-stage supercharger and single-stage turbocharger
- DB 623 A DB 603 with twin turbochargers
- DB 624 A DB 603 with a two-stage supercharger and single-stage turbocharger
- DB 626 A DB 603 with twin turbochargers and intercooler
- DB 627 The DB 603 fitted with a two-stage supercharger and after-cooler.
- DB 631 An abandoned three stage supercharged DB 603G.
- DB 632 A projected development of the DB 603N with contra-rotating propellers.
- MB 509 Development as a tank engine for the super-heavy Panzerkampfwagen Maus

All power data is given in metric horsepower as stated per manufacturer. Power (max) is Takeoff and Emergency power (5-min-rating), combat power is climb and combat power (30-min rating), continuous is without time limit.

== Applications ==
- Blohm & Voss BV 155
- Blohm & Voss BV 238
- Dornier Do 217
- Dornier Do 335
- Fiat G.56 - two prototypes flown
- Focke-Wulf Fw 190C - experimental installation
- Focke-Wulf Ta 152C - the medium altitude/ground-attack variant of the Ta 152
- Heinkel He 177B - prototype aircraft series
- Heinkel He 219
- Heinkel He 274
- Henschel Hs 130 - two DB 603s, supercharged by a single DB 605T engine driving HZ-Anlage supercharger in fuselage
- Macchi MC.207 - experimental installation, not flown
- Messerschmitt Me 410
- Reggiane Re.2006- experimental installation, not flown

=== Land vehicles ===
- Mercedes-Benz T80
- Panzerkampfwagen VIII Maus

== Specifications (DB 603A) ==
Data from Jane's

=== General characteristics ===
- Type: Liquid-cooled supercharged inverted V12 aircraft piston engine
- Bore: 162 mm (6.38 in)
- Stroke: 180 mm (7.09 in)
- Displacement: 44.52 L (2,716.9 in^{3})
- Length: 2,610.5 mm (102.8 in)
- Width: 830 mm (32.7 in)
- Height: 1156 mm (45.5 in)
- Dry weight: 920 kg (2,030 lb)

=== Components ===
- Valvetrain: Two intake and two sodium-cooled exhaust valves per cylinder actuated via a single overhead camshaft per cylinder block.
- Supercharger: Gear-driven centrifugal type supercharger
- Fuel system: Direct fuel injection
- Cooling system: pressurized water cooling

=== Performance ===
- Power output:
- 1,287 kW (1,750 PS; 1,726 hp) for takeoff
- 1,111 kW (1,511 PS; 1,490 hp) maximum continuous
- Specific power: 26.7 kW/L (0.59 hp/in^{3})
- Compression ratio: 7.5:1 left cylinder bank, 7.3:1 right cylinder bank
- Specific fuel consumption: 0.288 kg/(kW·h) (0.474 lb/(hp·h))
- Power-to-weight ratio: 1.29 kW/kg (0.79 hp/lb)

== See also ==
Related development

- Daimler-Benz DB 600
- Daimler-Benz DB 601
- Daimler-Benz DB 605

Comparable engines

- Allison V-1710
- Continental IV-1430
- Hispano-Suiza 12Y
- Junkers Jumo 213
- Klimov VK-107
- Mikulin AM-38
- Rolls-Royce Griffon

Related lists

- List of aircraft engines
- List of aircraft engines of Germany during World War II
