= Blohm & Voss BV 155 =

German high-altitude prototype interceptor aircraft

BV 155
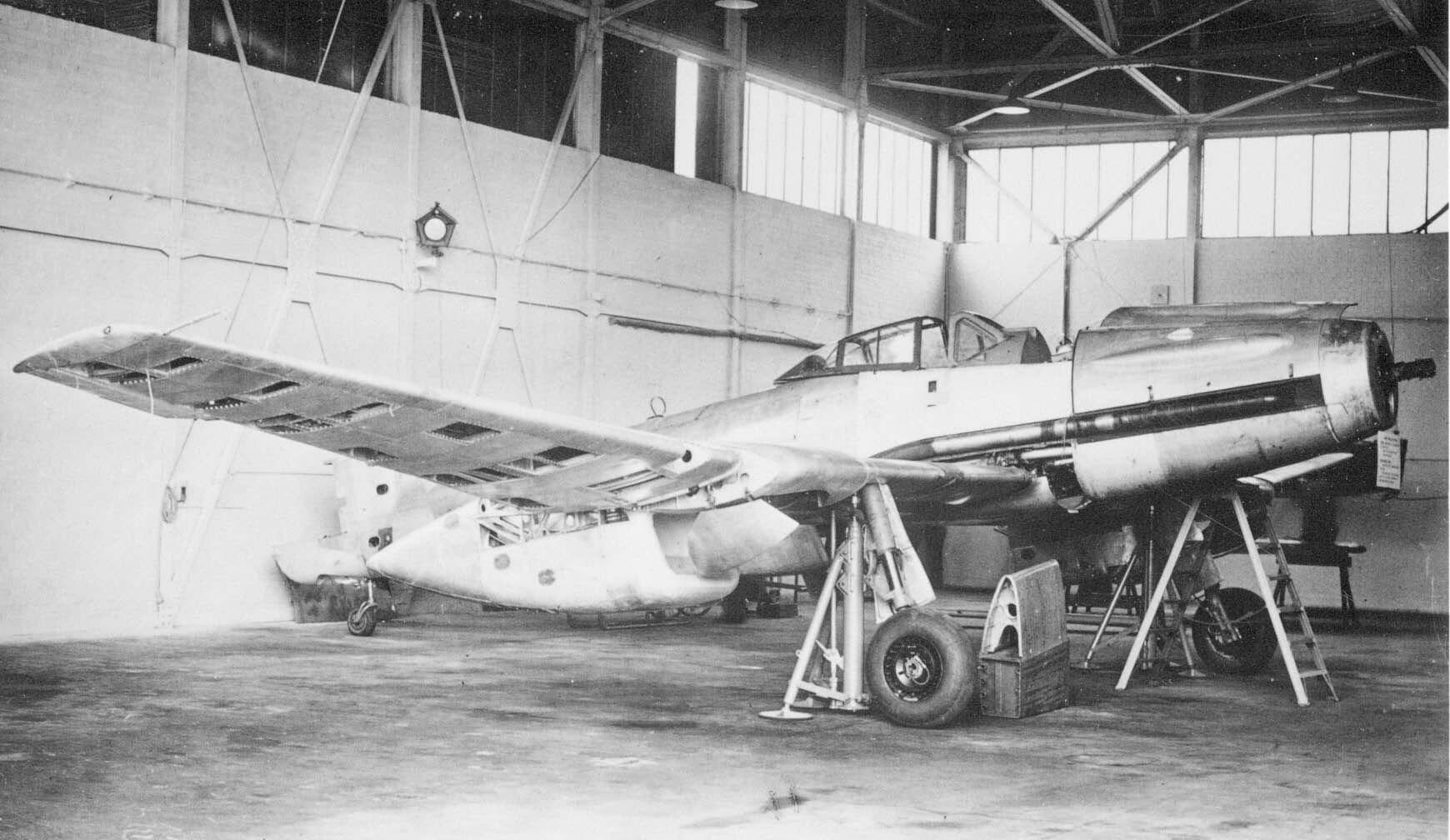
- Blohm & Voss BV 155 V2 prototype

General information
- Type: High-altitude interceptor
- National origin: Nazi Germany
- Manufacturer: Blohm & Voss
- Number built: 3

History
- First flight: 1 September 1944

The Blohm & Voss BV 155 is a German high-altitude interceptor aircraft intended to be used by the Luftwaffe against raids by USAAF Boeing B-29 Superfortresses. Work started on the design as the Messerschmitt Me 155 in 1942, but the project went through a protracted development period and change of ownership, and prototypes were still under test and development when World War II ended.

== Background ==
Performance estimates of the American B-29 Superfortress reached German command in early 1942. The bomber would cruise at an altitude at which no current German plane could operate effectively. To intercept it, the Luftwaffe would urgently need new aircraft. Work on such a high altitude fighter was begun by Messerschmitt, but in 1943 the project was passed to Blohm & Voss. The result would be the Bv155 prototype that made its first test flight in September 1944.

== Me 155 ==
The story of the BV 155 began at Messerschmitt in the spring of 1942. A requirement had arisen for a carrier-based single-seat fighter to be based aboard the aircraft carrier Graf Zeppelin, then under construction. In response, Messerschmitt proposed the Me 409, later renamed Me 155. In the interest of economy and simplicity, it was to use as many Messerschmitt Bf 109 components as possible, being basically a navalized version of the earlier Messerschmitt fighter.

The Me 155 was to be powered by a DB 605A-1 liquid-cooled engine of 1,475 PS (1,455 hp, 1,085 kW). The fuselage was more or less that of the standard Bf 109G, but with an entirely new wing. The undercarriage retracted inwards into wing wells, providing the wider track required for safe carrier landings. Standard naval equipment such as folding wings, catapult spools, and arrester gear were to be fitted. Proposed armament was an engine mounted 20 mm MG 151 cannon and two 20 mm MG 151 cannons and two 13 mm (.51 in) MG 131 machine guns in the wings. It had an estimated maximum speed of 649 km/h (403 mph). Three variants were worked out, the Me 155A with one Junkers Jumo 213, the Me 155B powered by a DB 628, which was basically a DB 605A with a two-stage mechanical supercharger with an induction cooler, and the Me 155C with one DB 605A.

Detail design of the Me 155 was complete by September 1942. However, the numerous delays in the Graf Zeppelin seemed to indicate that the completion of the carrier would be at least two years away. Messerschmitt was told to shelve the Me 155 project for the indefinite future. Work on the Graf Zeppelin carrier was eventually abandoned.

=== Me 155A ===
In order that all of that work on the Me 155 project not go entirely to waste, Messerschmitt adapted its design in November 1942 to match a Luftwaffe requirement for a fast single seat bomber. A single 1,000 kg (2,210 lb) SC1000 bomb was to be carried. All of the carrier equipment and most of the armament was removed from the aircraft. Additional fuel tanks were provided and an elongated, non-retractable tailwheel was added to provide ground clearance for the large bomb. The proposal was designated Me 155A in late 1942.

=== Me 155B ===
By the end of 1942, the increasing number of USAAF bombing raids and intelligence coming in about the new American B-29 bomber led the Luftwaffe to revive development of the Me 155B. The engine was to be the DB 628, which was basically a DB 605A with a two-stage mechanical supercharger with an induction cooler. A pressurized cabin was to be provided. It was estimated that a service ceiling of 14,097 m (46,250 ft) could be attained.

A converted Bf 109G adapted to take the DB 628 engine flew in May 1942 and attained an altitude of 15,500 m (50,850 ft). However, the Technische Amt concluded that a DB 603A engine with an exhaust-driven turbosupercharger was more promising. The DB 603A provided 1,201 kW (1,610 hp) for takeoff and 1,081 kW (1,450 hp) at 15,000 m (49,210 ft). This engine change required that the fuselage be elongated in order to house the turbosupercharger aft of the pressure cabin. Exhaust gases were carried to the turbosupercharger via external ducts. Air was drawn in through via a ventral trough aft of the wing. Standard Bf 109G wings were to be fitted outboard of a new, long-span, untapered wing center section. Other parts were scavenged from existing Messerschmitt designs – the vertical tail was from the Me 209, and the horizontal tail and the undercarriage were taken from the Bf 109G. The resulting revision of the Me 155B was designated P.1091 by Messerschmitt.

In August 1943, the RLM realised that Messerschmitt was over-committed and transferred the design work to Blohm & Voss. The design team there came to the conclusion that the existing Messerschmitt design had too many weaknesses and a complete redesign would be necessary.

== BV 155 ==
In September 1943, an order for five prototypes was placed. Blohm & Voss accepted the order only on condition they had complete design freedom and were not bound by Messerschmitt's work to date. The redesign was named the BV 155. B&V gave it a new laminar flow wing and tail unit, landing gear from the Ju 87 and many other parts of the plane. Further wind tunnel testing showed that there was a serious problem with the overwing radiators, at high angles of attack the wing "blanked" them from the airflow and cooling would suffer. Work moved to a revised B model.

The first prototype, BV 155 V1, took off for its maiden flight on 1 September 1944. Tests with the V1 showed that the outboard radiators provided inadequate cooling, especially at high angle of attack. The intakes on the next prototype were enlarged and underslung beneath the wing rather than placed over it. However, the enlarged radiators changed the aircraft's center of gravity which required moving the pressurized cockpit forward. The Blohm & Voss team took this opportunity to replace the original Bf 109G canopy with an aft-sliding all-round vision canopy, and the rear fuselage decking was cut down. This in turn required that a larger rudder be fitted. The ventral radiator bath was also enlarged.

With these changes, the BV 155 V2 flew on 8 February 1945. Blohm & Voss was still not satisfied with the design, and before the V2 began its flight trials they proposed that the engine be switched to the DB 603U having the larger mechanically driven supercharger of the DB 603E. The DB 603U promised a power of 1,238 kW (1,660 hp) for takeoff and 1,066 kW (1,430 hp) at 14,935 m (49,000 ft). The ventral turbosupercharger was retained. The Technische Amt decided to accept this proposal, and abandoned all work on the BV 155B in favor of the revised design, which was designated BV 155C.

The BV 155 V2 was damaged beyond repair during a bad landing. It was to be replaced in the test program by the BV 155 V3. The BV 155 V3 differed from the V2 in having the DB 603U intended for the BV 155C. However, the engine cowling and turbosupercharger were unchanged.

Various armament schemes for the BV 155B were proposed. One proposal had an engine-mounted (or Motorkanone) 30 mm (1.18 in) MK 108 cannon and two 20 mm MG 151/20 cannons. Another had a Motorkanone-mount 30 mm (1.18 in) MK 103 cannon and two wing-mounted 20 mm MG 151 cannons. Estimated maximum speed was 650 km/h (400 mph) at 12,000 m (39,370 ft) and 690 km/h (430 mph) at 15,999 m (52,490 ft). Service ceiling was to be 16,950 m (55,610 ft). Empty weight was 4,869 kg (10,734 lb). Normal loaded weight ranged from 5,126 to 5,488 kg (11,300-12,100 lb), depending on the armament provided.

According to the Pegasus Models Kit No. 5002 information sheet, V1 and V2 were both provided to the RAF after the war. V1 was flight-tested until it was written off. The fate of V3 is not known, except that it was left half-finished by the end of the war. V2 is in storage at the Smithsonian's National Air And Space Museum's storage facility.

=== BV 155C Project ===
In parallel with the prototype development, Blohm & Voss had been working on additional changes under Project 205. P.205 replaced the underwing radiators with an annular one around the front of the engine, a design feature commonly found on a number of German designs. With the wings now free of clutter, they were considerably simpler and were reduced in span. This also had the side effect of reducing the track, which would later prove to be a welcome change. The new design would be simpler, lighter and faster, and plans were made to make it the standard version of the aircraft. During the October re-evaluation, it was agreed that V1 and V2 would be completed as B models, while the V3 would be the prototype for the BV 155C.

The BV 155C was to be significantly different in appearance from the BV 155B. The clumsy wing-mounted radiators of the BV 155B were eliminated, and the main landing gear leg attachment points were moved inboard to retract inwards. Cooling was provided by an annular frontal radiator as in the Focke-Wulf Ta 152. Large circular intakes were attached to the fuselage sides above the wing roots. 30 were ordered but none were built. The V3 was 75% complete when it was captured. Intended armament for the 155C was two wing-mounted 20mm MG 151/20 cannons and a 30mm MK 108 cannon firing through the spinner.

== Surviving aircraft ==
The V2 prototype is currently in storage at the Smithsonian institution.

== Specifications (BV 155B) ==
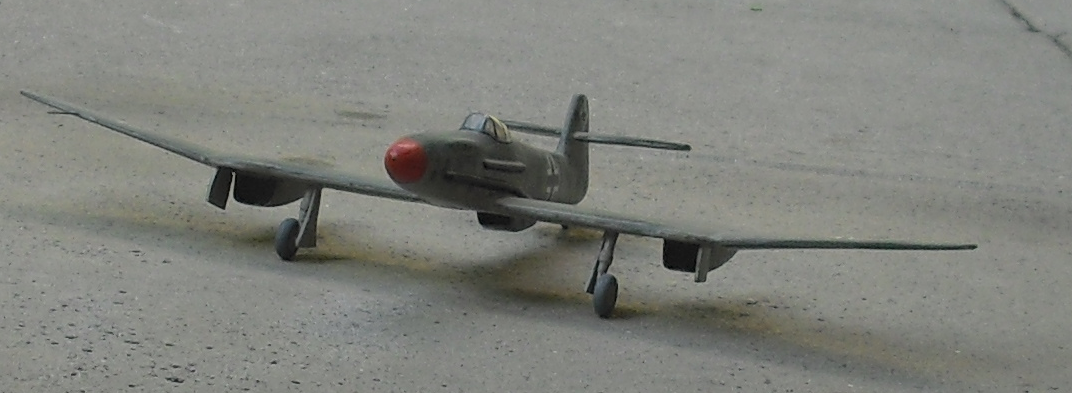
Blohm & Voss BV 155 (Model)

Data from

General characteristics

- Crew: 1
- Length: 12 m (39 ft 4 in)
- Wingspan: 20.5 m (67 ft 3 in)
- Height: 3 m (9 ft 10 in)
- Wing area: 39 m^{2} (420 sq ft)
- Empty weight: 4,870 kg (10,737 lb)
- Gross weight: 5,520 kg (12,170 lb) Proposal A

5,125 kg (11,299 lb) Proposal B
5,100 kg (11,244 lb) Proposal C
5,440 kg (11,993 lb) Proposal D

- Max takeoff weight: 6,020 kg (13,272 lb)
- Fuel capacity: 1,200 L (264 imp gal)
- Powerplant: 1 × Daimler-Benz DB 603A inverted V-12 liquid-cooled piston engine with TKL 15 turbo-charger, 1,200 kW (1,600 hp) for take-off

1,200 kW (1,609 hp) at 10,000 m (33,000 ft)
1,081 kW (1,450 hp) at 15,000 m (49,000 ft)

- Propellers: 4-bladed constant speed paddle bladed propeller

Performance

- Maximum speed: 420 km/h (260 mph, 230 kn) at sea level

520 km/h (323 mph) at 6,000 m (20,000 ft)
600 km/h (373 mph) at 10,000 m (33,000 ft)
650 km/h (404 mph) at 12,000 m (39,000 ft)
690 km/h (429 mph) at 16,000 m (52,000 ft)

- Range: 460 km (290 mi, 250 nmi) at maximum continuous power with 595 L (131 imp gal) of fuel at sea level

560 km (348 mi) with 595 L (131 imp gal) of fuel at 10,000 m (33,000 ft)
590 km (367 mi) with 595 L (131 imp gal) of fuel at 16,000 m (52,000 ft)
1,080 km (671 mi) with 1,200 L (264 imp gal) of fuel at sea level
1,350 km (839 mi) with 1,200 L (264 imp gal) of fuel at 10,000 m (33,000 ft)
1,440 km (895 mi) with 1,200 L (264 imp gal) of fuel at 16,000 m (52,000 ft)

- Service ceiling: 16,950 m (55,610 ft) service ceiling
- Maximum ceiling 17,100 m (56,100 ft)
- Rate of climb: 11.5 m/s (2,260 ft/min) initial

3.92 m/s (13 ft/s) at 16,000 m (52,000 ft)

- Time to altitude: 16,000 m (52,000 ft) in 29 minutes

Armament

- Guns:

Proposal A

- 1 × 30 mm (1.181 in) MK 108 cannon as an engine mounted Motorkanone firing through the propeller shaft
- 2 × 20 mm MG 151/20 cannon

Proposal B

- 1 × 30 mm (1.181 in) MK 103 cannon as an engine mounted Motorkanone firing through the propeller shaft with 60 rounds
- 2 × 15 mm (0.591 in) MG 151 cannon with 200 rpg

Proposal C

- 3 × 30 mm (1.181 in) MK 108 cannon with 60 rpg.

Proposal D

- 3 × 30 mm (1.181 in) MK 103 cannon with 60 rpg (two mounted in under-wing fairings).

== See also ==
Aircraft of comparable role, configuration, and era

- Fisher P-75 Eagle
- Focke-Wulf Ta 152
- Kawasaki Ki-64
- Nakajima Ki-87
- Republic XP-72
- Westland Welkin

Related lists

- List of military aircraft of Germany

== Sources ==
- Green, William. Aircraft of the Third Reich (1st ed.). London: Aerospace Publishing Limited, 2010. ISBN 978-1-900732-06-2.
- Green, William. Warplanes of the Second World War, Volume One: Fighters. London: Macdonald & Co.(Publishers) Ltd., 10th impression 1972, p. 80-82. ISBN 0-356-01445-2.
- Green, William. Warplanes of the Third Reich. London: Macdonald and Jane's Publishers Ltd., 4th impression 1979, p. 88-91. ISBN 0-356-02382-6.
- Hitchcock, Thomas H. Blohm & Voss 155 (Monogram Close-Up 20). Sturbridge, Massachusetts: Monogram Aviation Publications, 1990. ISBN 0-914144-20-0.
- Lepage, Jean-Denis G.G.. Aircraft of the Luftwaffe, 1935-1945: An Illustrated Guide. Jefferson, North Carolina: McFarland & Company, 2009. ISBN 978-0-7864-3937-9.
- Munson, Kenneth (1978). German Aircraft Of World War 2 in colour. Poole, UK: Blandford Press. ISBN 0-7137-0860-3.
- Sharp, Dan (2019). Blohn & Voss BV155. Horncastle, UK: Tempest Books. ISBN 978-1-911658-32-0.
- Smith J. Richard and Anthony L. Kay. German Aircraft of the Second World War. London: Putnam & Company Ltd., 1978, p. 88-91. ISBN 0-370-00024-2.
- Wood, Tony and Bill Gunston. Hitler's Luftwaffe: A pictorial history and technical encyclopedia of Hitler's air power in World War II. London: Salamander Books Ltd., 1977, p. 136. ISBN 0-86101-005-1.
