= Power-egg =

Modular engine installation

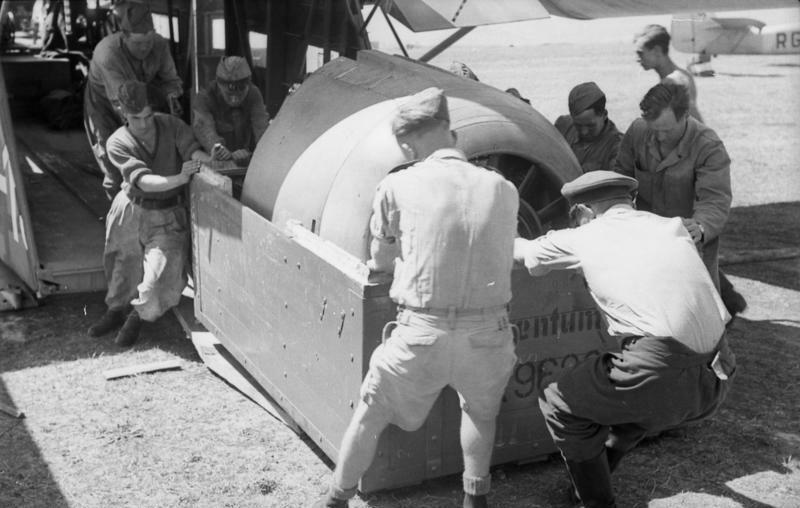
A BMW 801 Kraftei (power egg), being unloaded from a Gotha Go 242 transport glider. Russia, March 1943. Note the engine is already fitted with its cowling and cooling fan

A power-egg is a complete "unitized" modular engine installation, consisting of engine and all ancillary equipment, which can be swapped between suitably designed equipment, with standardised quick-changing attachment points and connectors.

In aircraft so designed, the power-egg is typically removed before mean time to failure is reached and a fresh one installed, the removed engine then being sent for maintenance. Spare power-eggs may be stored in sealed containers, to be opened when needed.

The power-egg or Kraftei format was used in some German Second World War era aircraft, particularly for twin or multi-engined airframe designs. It existed in two differing formats – the initial Motoranlage format which used some specialized added components depending on what airframe it was meant for use on, and the Triebwerksanlage format, a more complete unitization format usually including exhaust and oil cooling systems.

== Applications ==
=== Germany ===
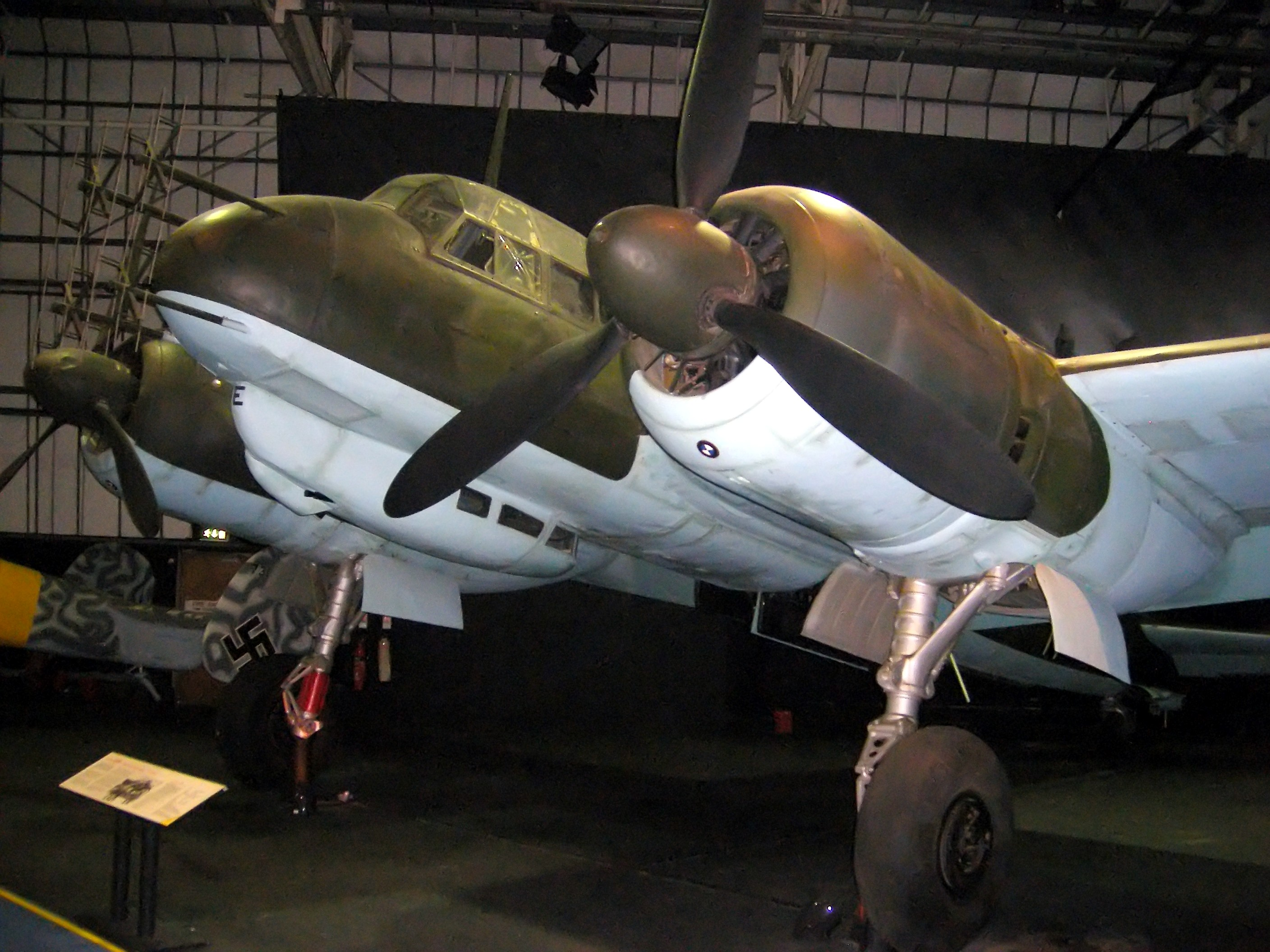
A surviving Junkers Ju 88R-1 night fighter with Kraftei unitized-installation BMW 801 engines, RAF Museum London, 2007

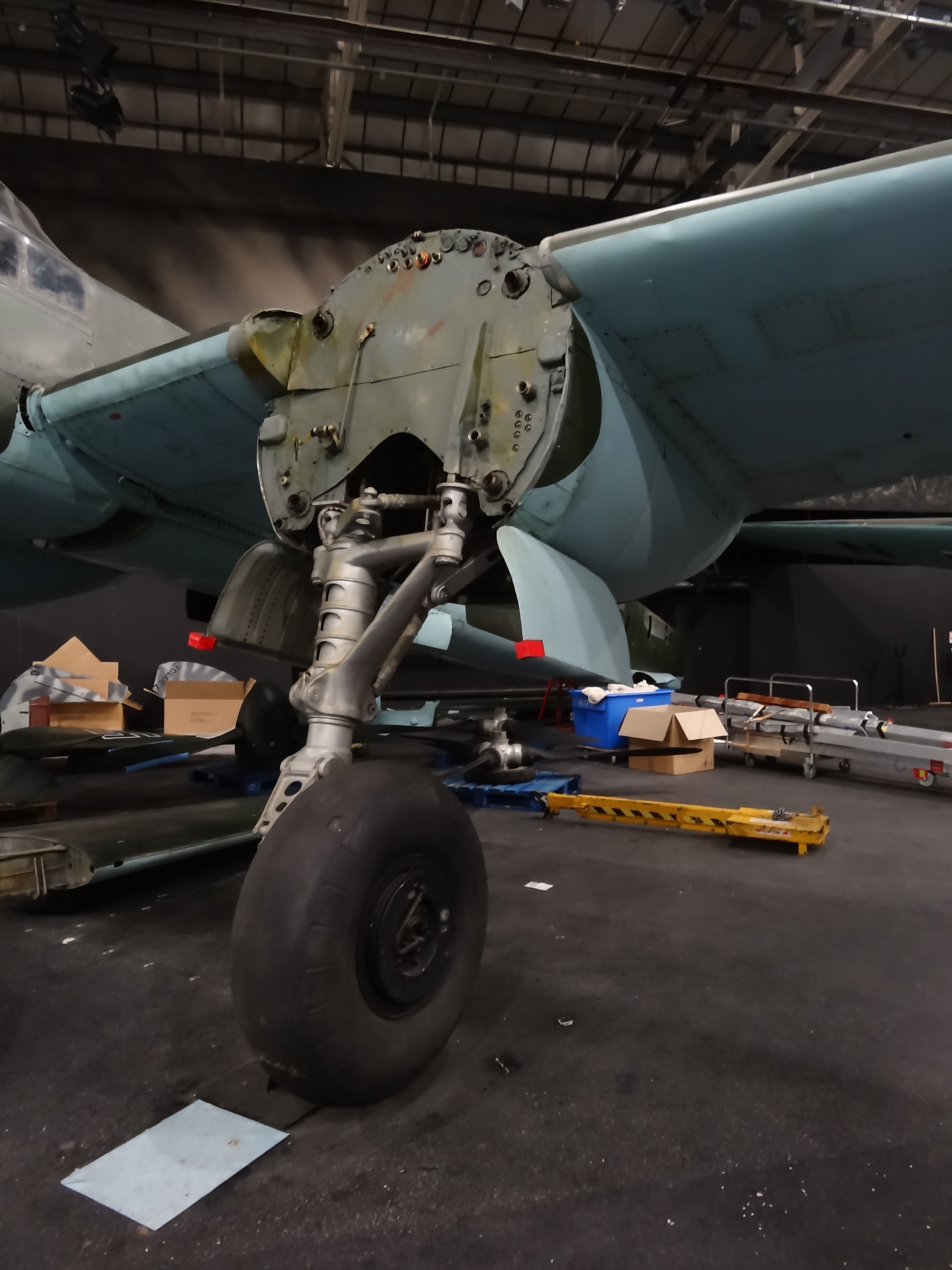
The same aircraft with its engines removed, showing the bulkhead mounting points, 2016

Inline and radial engines were both incorporated into the Kraftei concept: the Junkers Jumo 211 was a pioneering example of engine unitization, as used on both the Junkers Ju 88 using a novel annular radiator for both main engine coolant and engine oil cooling needs (viewable on the National Museum of the U.S. Air Force's restored Ju 88D-1 reconnaissance aircraft), with exactly the same nacelle packaging used to power the Messerschmitt Me 264 V1's first flights. Both the examples of the Dornier Do 217 medium bomber powered by inline engines, and the Axis Powers' largest-flown powered aircraft of any type, the Blohm & Voss BV 238 flying boat used essentially the same unitized Daimler-Benz DB 603 powerplants, complete with "chin" radiators under the nacelles as integral components. A differing Kraftei physical packaging is also believed to have been crafted by the Heinkel firm for the DB 603 engines used on its Heinkel He 219A night fighter, as what appears to be the same exact engine installation design used for the He 219A was also used for the quartet of ordered airframes for the same firm's He 177B four-DB 603-engined heavy bomber design's prototype series, as both airframe types' engine "units" used annular radiators and cylindrical cowls of identical appearance to enclose them.

The air-cooled BMW 801 fourteen-cylinder, twin-row radial engine was also provided in both formats for a number of German designs, especially for twin and multi-engined airframes, with the "M" or "T" first suffix letter designating whether it was a Motoranlage (the original format of the Kraftei concept) or the more comprehensively consolidated Triebwerksanlage format unitized powerplant – the BMW-designed forward cowling ring always used with the 801 incorporated the engine's oil cooler, making it an easy task for aviation engineers to use for such a "unitized" mounting concept.

One known surviving Motoranlage-packaged BMW 801 radial still exists and is on restored display at the New England Air Museum, Bradley International Airport, Windsor Locks, CT, with preserved examples of a Ju 88R-1 night fighter and Ju 388L-1 reconnaissance aircraft, one each in the United Kingdom and the United States respectively, also having unitized Kraftei-installation BMW 801 radials on them.

=== Soviet Union ===
Project 651E, originally envisaged as a modification of the Juliett-class submarine, consisted of a small mostly self-contained additional 600 kW nuclear reactor, model VAU-6, the so-called Dollezhal egg. This nuclear powerpack aimed to greatly prolong submerged capabilities of what was otherwise a normal diesel-electric submarine with long duration idling and underwater recharging of batteries. The system was developed but did not see unclassified service through 1985.

=== United Kingdom ===
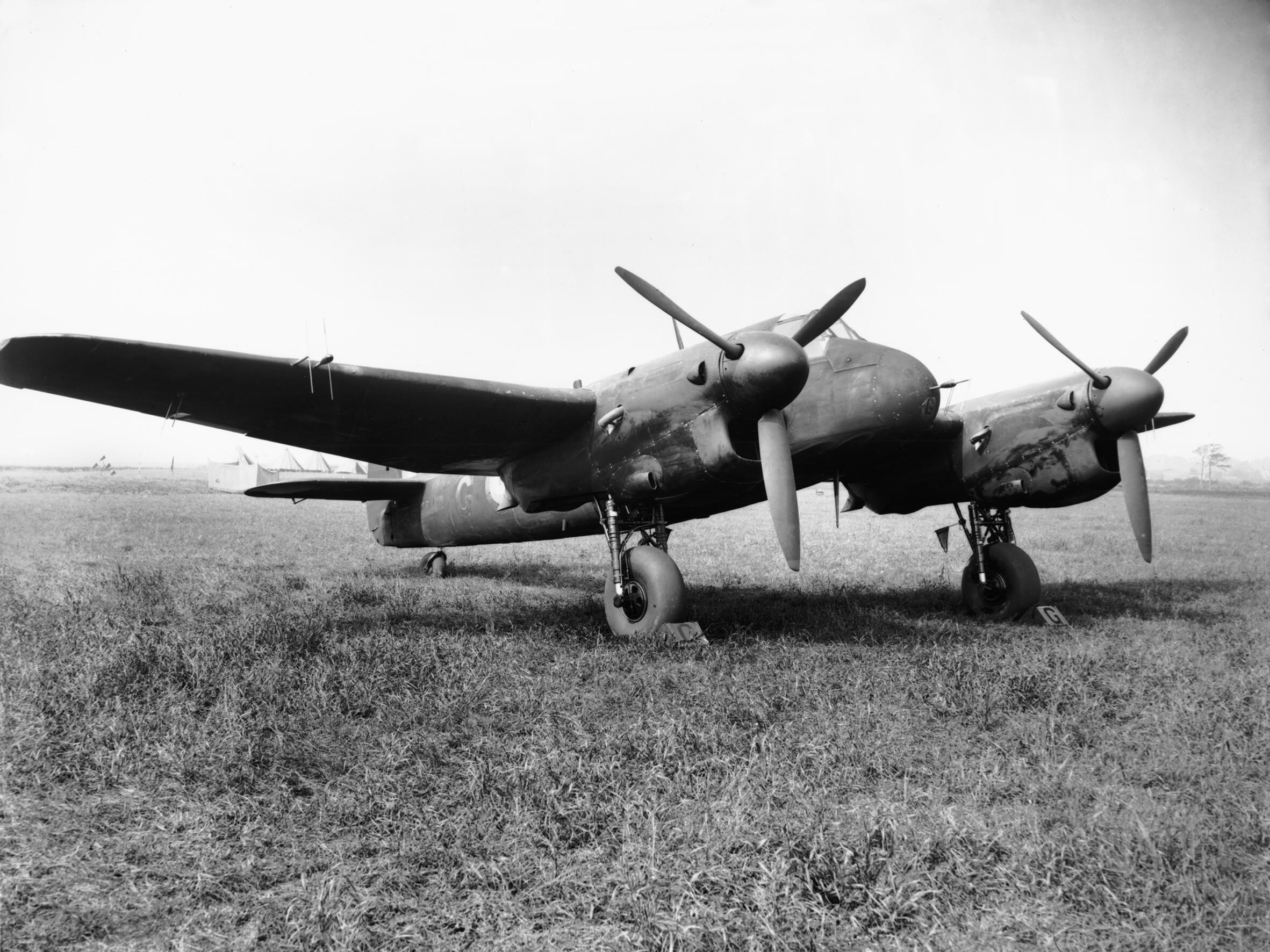
A Merlin-powered, Beaufighter night fighter Mark II of No. 255 Squadron RAF at RAF Hibaldstow, September 1941, showing the Merlin Power Plants later used on the Lancaster.

A scheme for unitised engine installations was initiated by the Air Ministry in 1937 and after consultation with the Society of British Aircraft Constructors (SBAC) a system was devised allowing standardised dimensions and bulkhead fittings for both inline and radial engine installations of similar power.

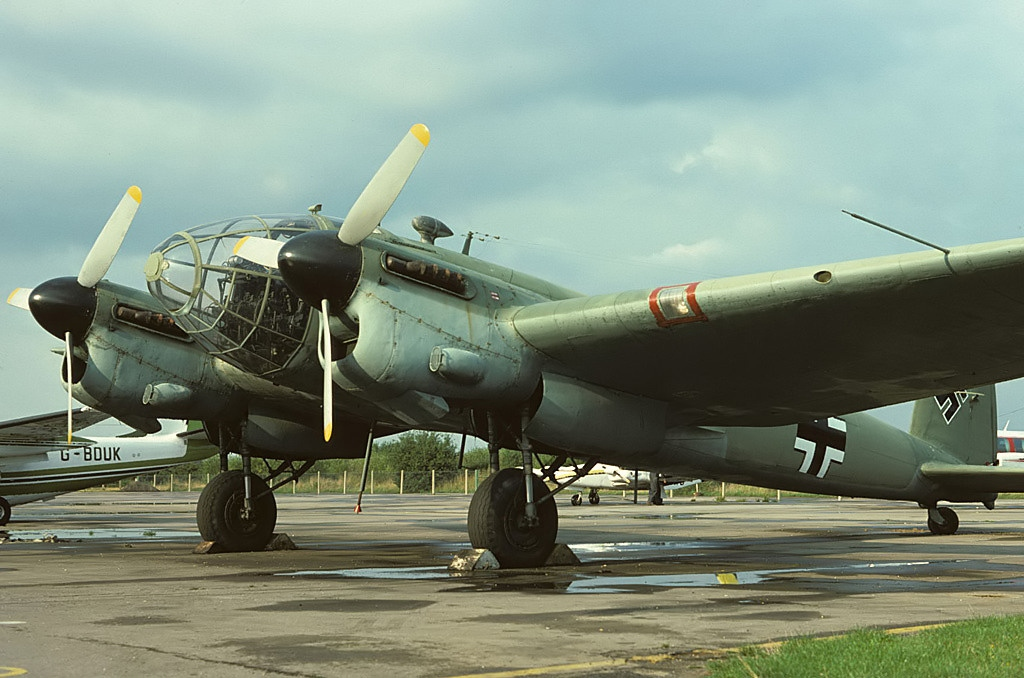
Post-war CASA 2.111 (Spanish-built Heinkel He 111) with Rolls-Royce Merlin power plants of the type originally used on the Beaufighter II and Lancaster

The Bristol Aeroplane Company devised an installation known as a "power egg" for the Hercules engine in 1938, an example of which was exhibited at the 1938 Paris Aeronautical Salon. The Hercules installation was used on the Bristol Beaufighter, Armstrong Whitworth Albemarle, Vickers Wellington, Short Stirling, and Handley Page Halifax.

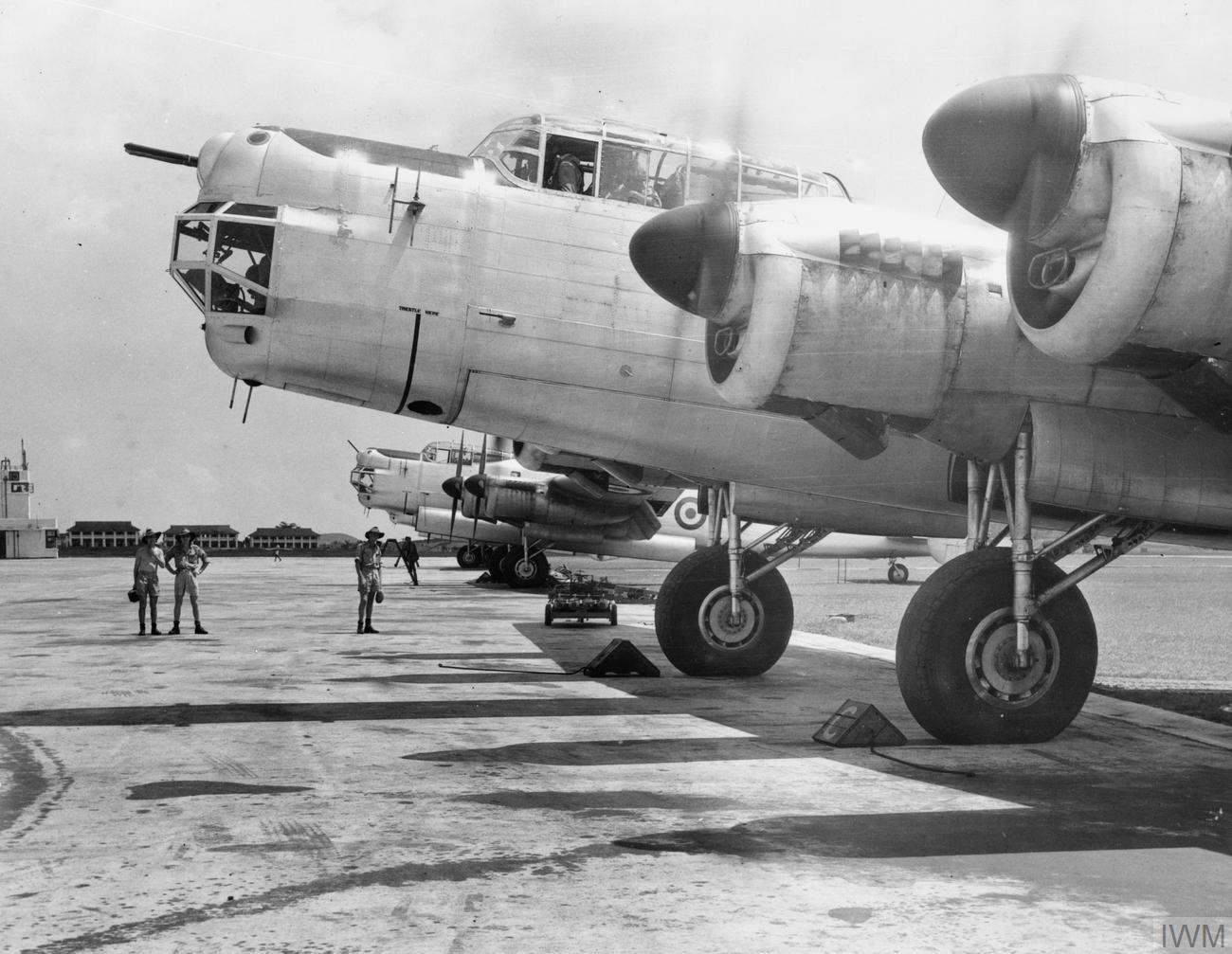
Universal Power Plant (UPP) Merlin 85 installations on an Avro Lincoln

After an early "Power Unit" installation was devised by Rolls-Royce (RR) for the Merlin X and used in the Armstrong Whitworth Whitley and Vickers Wellington, a more advanced "Power Plant" design was devised for the Merlin XX, a unitized Merlin XX-series engine installation and nacelle being designed and first used on the Beaufighter Mark II which was later also used on the Miles M.20, Avro Lancaster and Avro York, and the post-war CASA 2.111. Merlin Power Plant production rose from just over 100 in 1939 to nearly 14,000 by 1944, mostly destined for the Lancaster.

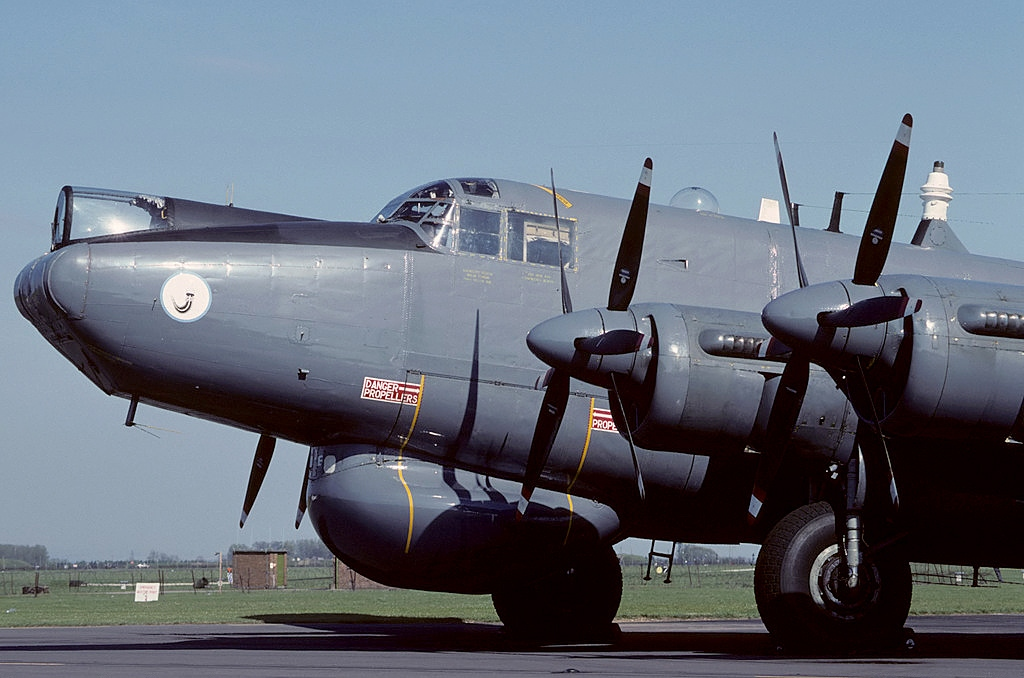
The later Universal Power Plant (UPP) Griffon installations on an Avro Shackleton.

A new installation was subsequently designed as the "Universal Power Plant" (UPP) radiator and cowling installation developed for the Avro Lincoln (Merlin 65, 68, and 85) and also used on the Vickers Windsor (Merlin 85), and subsequently used on the Avro Tudor (Merlin 100-series), Canadair North Star/Argonaut (Merlin 600-series), and Avro Shackleton (Griffon 61 and 62).

Capable of mounting either the 27 litre Merlin or the larger 37 litre Griffon, the UPP attached to the nacelle firewall via the SBAC standard 56 in (1.4 m) circular bulkhead. In the North Star (A Canadian-built variant of the Douglas DC-4) the UPP design had to be changed slightly due to having to use the non-standard Douglas 60 in (1.5 m) DC-4 bulkhead attachment, resulting in the North Star's cowling panels being tapered slightly rather than parallel-sided. The UPP installation had the advantage that all engines were interchangeable between nacelle positions, i.e., an inboard engine could be exchanged with an outboard engine, and engine types (Merlin or Griffon) and Mark No.s could be mixed and flown on the same aircraft, a Hucknall Lancaster test bed being flown with two Merlins for the North Star in one position, and with two Merlins for the Tudor in the others.

Rolls-Royce continued the practice of unitised engine packages post-war with the Dart and Tyne turboprops, and later with podded jet engines such as the Conway and RB211 being supplied as complete RR-designed units with all cowling panels and nacelle fittings, including thrust reverser, ready for attachment to the engine pylon.

=== United States ===
In the United States, the Navy wrote a specification for a quick engine change (QEC) in 1935.

Pratt & Whitney produced a R-2180-E Twin Wasp E "power egg" installation certificated in 1945 for use as an engine upgrade for the Douglas DC-4, however finding few buyers, it was eventually only used on the Saab 90 Scandia.

== See also ==
- Avia S-199, Bf 109 airframes fitted with engines and propellers of the Heinkel He 111 bomber
- Powerpack (drivetrain)
- Power module
- Prime mover
