= Kurt Tank =

German aeronautical engineer (1898–1983)

Kurt Waldemar Tank
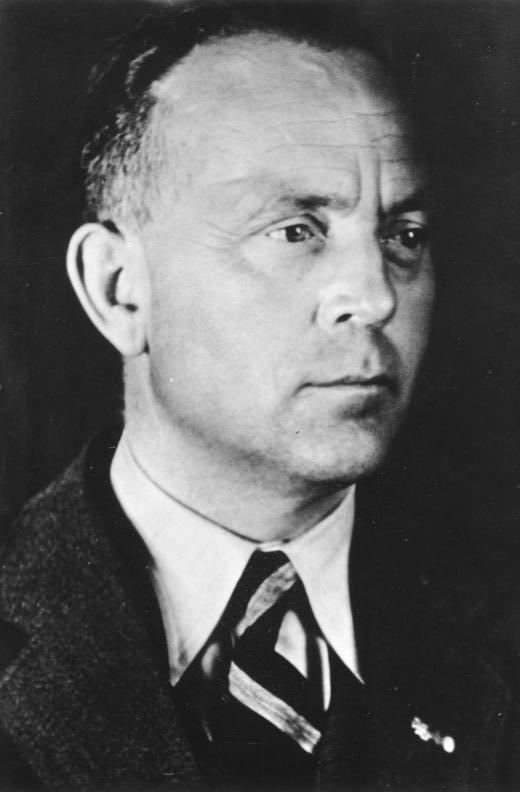
- Born: 24 February 1898; Bromberg, German Empire (now Bydgoszcz, Poland)
- Died: 5 June 1983 (aged 85); Munich, West Germany
- Education: Technische Universität Berlin
- Engineering career
- Projects: Akaflieg Berlin B2; Rohrbach Ro VIII; Rohrbach Ro IX; Focke-Wulf Fw 190; Focke-Wulf Ta 152; Focke-Wulf Fw 200; FMA IAe 33; HAL HF-24
- Awards: Iron Cross 1st and 2nd Class, 1914; Ehrenkreuz Schwarzburg-Sondershausen; Ehrenkreuz für Frontkämpfer

Kurt Waldemar Tank (24 February 1898 – 5 June 1983) was a German aeronautical engineer and test pilot who led the design department at Focke-Wulf from 1931 to 1945. He was responsible for the creation of several important Luftwaffe aircraft of World War II, including the Fw 190 fighter aircraft, the Ta 152 fighter-interceptor and the Fw 200 Condor airliner. After the war, Tank spent two decades designing aircraft abroad, working first in Argentina and then in India, before returning to West Germany in the late 1960s to work as a consultant for Messerschmitt-Bölkow-Blohm (MBB).

== Early life ==
Tank was born on 24 February 1898 in Bromberg-Schwedenhöhe, now Bydgoszcz and Szwederowo district respectively, located in present-day Poland. Tank grew up near the Netze River in the now dissolved Province of Posen. His grandfather was a cavalry sergeant in the Uhlans and his father, Willi Tank, was a grenadier sergeant in the 3rd Division. After retiring from military service, his father worked as a technician in Nakel, at a power plant located on the Netze river.

== Education ==
When World War I broke out in 1914, Tank wanted to join the Imperial German Army's Fliegertruppe air force. However, his father insisted that Tank instead follow the family tradition and enlist in the cavalry regiment he had served in. Tank ended the war as a lieutenant and a company commander, having been wounded in action multiple times and winning many awards and honors. He had won the Iron Cross 1st and 2nd Class of 1914, the Ehrenkreuz Schwarzburg-Sondershausen and the Ehrenkreuz für Frontkämpfer.

Tank had spent the four years of the war reading an unnamed physics book. He was very interested in hydrodynamics, the laws which govern theoretical fluid dynamics. Tank wanted to apply the theories he had learned in real life by becoming a pilot. He applied many times for a transfer to the Fliegertruppe, however, unbeknownst to him, his senior officers wanted to retain him in the army because he was a great soldier. After the war, Tank studied at and graduated from the Technische Hochschule Berlin (now the Technische Universität Berlin) in 1923. Tank had studied electro-technology, but his recreational pursuit of gliding made him inclined towards aviation. Tank had also worked on building sailplanes with Akaflieg Berlin, and had started the Akaflieg (aviation) club at his university along with seven other students. These eight students had started the Akaflieg club to protect aviation development at their university from the rigid constraints imposed by the Treaty of Versailles. The Akaflieg club was supported mainly by army officer Adolf Baeumker, and also by their professor August von Parseval.

The other seven students who had established the club were Hermann Winter, Werner Henninger, Pauleduard Punk, Seppl Kutin, Viktor Gohlke, Edmund Pfister and Georg Gillert. These eight students had created a workshop at the university's loft, where they started building two gliders while learning aeronautics from professors Emil Everling and Hans Reissner. Tank was building a monoplane which was strut-braced and had a big wingspan. Winter was building a monoplane without a tail, which he named Charlotte after the daughter of professor Parseval. This monoplane was the Akaflieg Berlin B1, which the group used to participate in the 2nd Rhön Competition organized by the Rhön-Rossitten Gesellschaft in 1922. Winter piloted the plane's flying wing model during the competition, but the plane was hit by a downdraft and it crashed near Gersfeld. The group then moved the plane on a wagon to Gotha. There, Gothaer Waggonfabrik had the plane sent to Berlin, where the group repaired it. Meanwhile, Tank had built a shoulder-wing plane with a big wingspan, which the group entered in the 1923 Rhön Competition. This plane was the Akaflieg Berlin B2 Teufelchen.

However, it was not possible to build both the B2 and B1 planes at the group's small workshop in the university's loft. The students also couldn't build it themselves, or their academics would be impacted. Therefore, Tank and Gillert went to the Albatros Flugzeugwerke factory in the Berlin suburb of Johannisthal. There, they met Robert Thelen, then an aviation world record holder who was a director at the company. However, Thelen did not want to build an entire sailplane for free, especially because it used wing warping wingtips in place of ailerons. (Note: After Albatros Flugzeugwerke merged with Focke-Wulf in 1932, Tank became Robert Thelen's boss.) Tank and Gillert then went to Luft-Fahrzeug-Gesellschaft in Stralsund, who agreed to build the B2 Teufelchen ("Little Devil"). By building the B2, Tank had passed his preliminary exams; his academic output was assessed favorably by professors Parseval and Wilhelm Hoff. At the Rhön Competition in August 1923, Tank had to force land the B2 on unfavorable terrain when he was practicing flying. The B2 was wrecked and the group had used up all their money by then. The group was later able to repair the B2 and fly it in Rositten. Tank then trained and qualified for a flying license at Staaken, flying the DFS Kranich with Rudolf Rienau as his trainer.

== Early career ==
=== Rohrbach Ro III ===
One of Tank's professors, Max Kloss, had already offered him a job at Siemens. In early 1924 however, he met another professor of his, M. Weber, at a train station in Potsdam. Weber told him about the openings at Rohrbach Metallflugzeug, which was working on aircraft design, a field Weber knew Tank was interested in. Rohrbach had asked Weber to recommend recently graduated engineers to them. Tank took up the offer quickly, as he already had experience in both flying and aircraft design. At Rohrbach, Tank was assigned the task of establishing a design bureau at the company. Tank began his work at Rohrbach by conducting flight tests on the Ro III, a flying boat powered by two Rolls-Royce Eagle IX engines. Tank meanwhile continued his flight training and began training on flying boats. During testing, the Ro III's front hull was found to undergo a lot of strain when landing on choppy waters. The stiffeners on the bulkhead plates would usually crack after these landings. Tank suggested that a cushioned keel would reduce the strain on the front hull and keep it within an endurable range. To test this idea, Rohrbach allowed Tank to tow Ro III models with varying keel types on water.

Such testing was first done at the Preußische Versuchsanstalt für Wasser-, Erd- und Schiffbau in Berlin. This testing was later done at Hamburgische Schiffbau-Versuchsanstalt in Hamburg with bigger models. Tank towed varying designs for 1000s of kilometres; these tests verified his ideas and Rohrbach incorporated them into their production models. The changed designs had a keel which spread landing impact over longer durations and lengths, lowering landing pressure on the hull without impacting takeoff performance. These changes were implemented on the Rohrbach Ro V Rocco, Rohrbach Romar, Rohrbach Ro XI Rostra and both variants (I and II) of the Rohrbach Ro VII Robbe. After more testing and with observations on the aforementioned planes, Tank introduced an improved design with a modified empennage and wings. The older designs used a constant chord rectangular wing, while the newer designs used a tapered wing which had a significantly lower weight. The new tapered wings had higher taper at an invariant thickness. These modifications enhanced flight handling and also allowed for more maneuverability.

=== Rohrbach Ro IX Rofix ===
In 1925, the Turkish Air Force ordered two prototypes of the Rohrbach Ro IX Rofix to function as fighter aircraft. Tank designed these two aircraft as full metal planes with a significant dihedral and two cables which braced the wings. This design was much like the design of the latter Rohrbach Ro VIII Roland. Tank had said the distinct structure of the aircraft was intended to allow the pilot unconstrained visibility in all directions. Testing showed that the significant dihedral angle allowed the pilot great visibility, but made the aircraft unstable and sent it into Dutch rolls on the yaw and roll axes. The aircraft was also found to have difficulties with spins.

The second Ro IX prototype crashed in January 1927 with Werner Landmann as its pilot. As a result, the dihedral angle was eliminated. Ernst Udet then flew the plane and issued a positive assessment on 1 July 1927. Udet also noted down a few potential improvements, namely greater aileron control, enhanced lateral stability and better handling during slip maneuvers. After Udet's feedback was implemented, the Ro IX was tested and approved for flying by the German Aerospace Center. On 15 July 1927, pilot Paul Bäumer crashed in the Ro IX; Tank said Bäumer had not considered that such large planes can execute spin maneuvers only at low throttle. Tank represented Rohrbach in an inquiry into the incident. At the inquiry, fighter pilot Friedrich Mallinckrodt questioned why a fighter aircraft was designed as a monoplane and not a biplane. Many other WWI fighter pilots also said a monoplane fighter was very dangerous and not suitable for flight. Tank reminded the fighter pilots they had flown the Fokker D.VIII, a monoplane, with great success during the war; thereafter, the issue of a monoplane fighter was settled.

=== Rohrbach Ro VII Robbe ===
The Rohrbach Ro VII Robbe I was most probably developed by Tank. It was the first flying boat to have a pusher configuration, which ensures sufficient airflow is available to neutralize the greater drag caused by the aircraft's engines. The configuration also shielded the propellers from sea spray. Tank began by measuring the plane's dimensions to ascertain whether the propeller arc would be impaired by the boundary layer streaming off of the wing. These tests were done at the Max Planck Institute for Dynamics and Self-Organization in Göttingen. Professors Ludwig Prandtl and Jakob Ackeret were also involved in these experiments. When the propeller blades entered the boundary layer, a loud sound was heard, which Prandtl proved was an A note. Tank also conducted other tests in Göttingen. Professor Albert Betz had created a system to assess the real drag of an aircraft. Tank used this system to compare two of his designs, and found the first one had 30% more drag than the second one. He then improved his design, which resulted in lighter wings, and a higher tailplane which was outside the range of sea spray.

The Rohrbach Ro VII Robbe II, with a sharp taper and an aspect ratio of 8.40, was built for research and setting records. Aviation experts cautioned Rohrbach about the very high taper and said it would stall on one wing, so did Landmann. Tank said the tapered wings provided much more control to the pilots because the incremental drag would be quite lower compared to rectangular wings. Landmann, initially hesitant, later found the Robbe II to be very maneuverable. Udet wanted to attempt a trans-Atlantic flight, he teamed up with Tank and chose the Robbe II as his plane. Udet flew his first practice flight on the same day, after Tank had told Udet the aircraft had a high landing speed. Udet executed both the takeoff and sky flying properly, but he slowed down on his landing approach. The plane stalled at approximately 50 feet (15 m) and dropped into the water. It seemed as if the plane had sunk, but then it appeared again on the water with only little damage. The aircraft hadn't tilted towards either wing, it had stayed straight while its altitude dropped.

Three weeks thereafter, the two attempted a record flight, with Udet as the pilot and Tank as the navigator. Tank ensured that Udet did not have either a slow takeoff speed or rate of ascent. The flight was expected to take ten hours and cover a distance of 2,000 kilometres (1,200 mi). They were flying a preset triangular route three times from Copenhagen to the Swedish coast and back, with officials from the Fédération Aéronautique Internationale watching. They were flying well, but then they heard a sharp sound, the engines buzzed loudly and the aircraft began shaking. Tank and Udet managed to regain control, but then the plane quickly lost height and dropped into the water. The two propellers had blown off and the engines had shut down, but the plane had still landed and did not sink. There was a small fire because the fuel tanks had been hit by the propellers' pieces. The idea of attempting a trans-Atlantic flight was dropped.

=== Rohrbach Ro VIII Roland ===
Tank's most successful design was the Ro VIII Roland, a fast passenger airliner with three engines, built to fulfill an order by Lufthansa. Tank said the semi-cantilever shoulder-wing design ensured passengers had complete visibility of the ground below. Tank also said the engines were positioned below the wings to ensure there was constant airflow over the plane's upper control surfaces. While the aircraft was being built, Lufthansa met with Tank and Adolf Rohrbach. Lufthansa asked them to reduce the plane's wing loading from 80 kg/sqm to less than 60 kg/sqm, or they would back off from the order. One solution was lengthening the wingspan, but this would be a very expensive change since all the wings had been manufactured by then. Tank and Rohrbach designer Steiger came up with another idea: increasing wing chord towards the outer end. This change wasn't costly, the incremental drag was low and the plane's speed wasn't reduced significantly. Tank also designed a canopy for the pilots, a glass roof which would shield them from the weather. Lufthansa initially did not allow the addition of the canopy, but all Rolands in Lufthansa's fleet were gradually fitted with them.

=== Stint at Messerschmitt ===
After adverse weather conditions undermined the flight trials of the Rohrbach Romar, in 1929 Tank realized flying boats had many issues as their operation was mostly contingent on an ideal situation at sea. Tank was worried about the prospects of Rohrbach because of their limited production batches and a forthcoming recession. Therefore, Tank decided to join a firm building land based aircraft. In January 1930, Tank joined Bayerische Flugzeug-Werke in Augsburg as the director of their projects division, just after pilot Hans Hackmack had died when the BFW M.20 he was flying crashed. Lufthansa had ordered the M.20, and Tank had to justify its flight worthiness before Lufthansa director Erhard Milch.

On 14 October 1930, Tank was working with test pilot Eberhard Mohnicke in Augsburg to know more about the BFW M.22. Mohnicke then went to fly the M.22 once again from Augsburg to Landsberg and back. Mohnicke crashed on the landing approach when returning. In April 1931, another M.20 crashed and BFW shut down. Messerschmitt, a unit of BFW, continued operating. However, Tank left the company in September 1931 because of creative differences with Willy Messerschmitt, its eponymous founder. Messerschmitt believed the ultralight aviation idea was universally applicable, Tank believed it was not prudent considering the rapidly growing size of aircraft.

== At Focke-Wulf ==
Tank moved to the firm Albatros Flugzeugwerke, where he worked as a test pilot. The Albatros company went bankrupt in 1929 and in 1931, under government pressure, was merged with Focke-Wulf. In November 1931, Tank joined Focke-Wulf in Bremen as the head of design and flight testing. Tank initially focused on test flying aircraft, mostly those brought over from Albatros. He worked on incorporating his signature features into these aircraft. The first aircraft he test flew were the Albatros Al 101 and the Albatros L102. Tank almost died when the L102 he was flying crashed after he put into a dive at 4,000 feet (1,200 m). He managed to get out of the plane before it exploded and did not sustain any significant injuries. Tank also found ways to improve the Focke-Wulf Fw 43 Falke, but he could not implement his ideas because only a few models of the plane were built.

Tank then test flew the Focke-Wulf Fw 47 Höhengeier, developed by Henrich Focke. Focke believed the aircraft could not fly spin maneuvers because of its unique wing shape. Tank broadened the tail and used the rudder to show the aircraft could be spun. Tank then started work on the design of the Focke-Wulf Fw 44 Stieglitz, a biplane trainer. While flying the aircraft at Bremen, Tank found it would shake uncontrollably. The two separate elevators were revealed to be the problem, so they were merged into one unit. After the Fw 44 was moved to production in 1934, Tank worked on test piloting the Albatros L103. During this period, Tank also began building a team which could make complex aircraft like airliners because the new German government did not restrict aviation. Tank convinced Focke-Wulf director Werner Naumann to fund these new projects. Tank brought over Hans Schuberth, Andreas Faehlmann and other engineers to Focke-Wulf. New divisions and teams were created to build these aircraft, with Tank managing and advising them.

In 1934, Tank's Focke-Wulf Fw 56 Stösser advanced trainer began production. In 1935, Ernst Udet used the Stösser to demonstrate the utility of dive bombing to German officials. A total of 900 to 1,000 Stössers were built, but none are extant today. Tank then wanted to build a full-metal aircraft so he could modernize the company's production processes and upskill its employees. Three prototypes of the Focke-Wulf Fw 57, a heavy strike aircraft, were built as a result. However, production models of the Fw 57 were not built because the RLM (Nazi Aviation Ministry) had decided it would induct light strike aircraft. In 1934, Tank also conceptualized the Focke-Wulf Fw 159, a single seater chase fighter according to the RLM's requirements. Tank modeled the Fw 159 after the Polish PZL P.24, considered the best fighter during the early 1930s. However, it was not inducted by the RLM due to its heaviness and high drag.

=== Focke-Wulf Fw 58 Weihe ===
The Focke-Wulf Fw 58 Weihe, a multi-role plane, was designed in 1934 as requested by the RLM. Tank says the Weihe had low wing loading because a newbie pilot could then focus on flying with two engines and learn how to operate foldable landing gear. Tank primarily used the Weihe for his personal travel. In November 1941, Tank was flying from Paris to Bremen when his radio operator alerted him about hostile aircraft. Tank saw these aircraft and initially thought they were friendly Messerschmitt Bf 109s. However, he later identified them as Supermarine Spitfires of the Royal Air Force after they started firing at him. The Weihe's left wing broke and its aileron was torn away. The aircraft was on the verge of stalling when they managed to land at Hilversum Airfield. The Spitfires' rounds had hit the Weihe 47 times and almost killed Tank and the radio operator. The RLM permanently barred Tank from flying the Weihe over areas where fighting was ongoing, and assigned a Junkers Ju 88 as his new personal plane. Tank also used the high speed Focke-Wulf Fw 189 Uhu as his personal plane.

=== Focke-Wulf Fw 187 Falke ===
After the Fw 159 was not ordered due to its high weight and drag, Tank began ideating a high speed fighter with two engines. This format was approved and ordered by Wolfram von Richthofen, the RLM head of development, in 1936. Tank flew the first prototype of the Focke-Wulf Fw 187 Falke in 1937. Even though the Falke had performed well during trials, the RLM did not induct it because it was two times heavier than the Bf 109, and its costly twin engines. Tank argued a twin engine fighter would be more effective over distant hostile territories because it offered redundance in case one engine was hit. The 1st and 3rd prototypes crashed, but four other models were ordered because of the Falke's performance during tests. The RLM suggested the addition of a cooling system to the aircraft which would decrease the drag induced by the radiators. However, the RLM ordered the Messerschmitt Bf 110 instead, even though the Falke had performed similarly.

=== Focke-Wulf Fw 190 ===
In 1938, Tank was commissioned to build a new fighter after many Bf 109s crashed. Two designs were proposed by Tank, one with a Daimler-Benz DB 601 water-cooled engine, the other with a BMW 139, a double radial engine. Tank says he chose radial engines because they were less likely to be impaired than water-cooled engines. In 1941, six initial Fw 190s were tested at Rechlin. The aircraft was found to have insufficient cooling and jumbled cylinders; furthermore, some sections of the engine cowling would break off at high speed. The variable-pitch propeller also had issues. Tank and his team collaborated with technicians from Jagdgeschwader 26 to solve these problems. By 1941, the Fw 190 was performing much better than the Spitfire Mark V in combat. British pilots initially thought the Fw 190s were Curtiss Hawk aircraft. In July 1942, Tank wrote to the RLM about the much better performance the Fw 190 could have as a bomber with a BMW 139 engine. In August 1942, the 139 engines were sent to the Daimler-Benz factory in Echterdingen for testing. However, these modified Fw 190s weren't flown in combat because their test base at Nellingen was occupied by the US Army in April 1945.

In 1942, Tank was piloting an Fw 190 to Berlin, while trying to learn the night combat method developed by Major Hajo Herrmann at the Döberitz military training area. When Tank was returning to Langenhagen, the Fw 190 began leaking fuel somewhere over the Elbe river. Tank was growing unconscious and could not spot the nearby town of Stendal. He struggled for some time but managed to land at Langenhagen, and aircrew found him passed out in the cockpit. A fuel line of the Fw 190 had been dripping fuel, and the aircraft had fuel levels sufficient only for a single circuit. If the aircraft had flown for sometime more, the engine would have shut down.

=== Focke-Wulf Fw 191 ===
In 1940, the Focke-Wulf Fw 191 was entered into a tender for a mid-heavy bomber by the RLM. Focke-Wulf was commissioned to make two models. Tank deliberated between choosing the Daimler-Benz DB 604, Junkers Jumo 222 and the Daimler-Benz DB 603. However, the RLM proposed using the Daimler-Benz DB 605, which reduced the range and payload of the aircraft without enhancing the speed. However, all the aforementioned engines were not available due to the war, and a BMW 801 had to be used for the Fw 191. The aircraft was not developed further. Tank believes the Fw 191 was needless, because the government was confused between dive bombers and long-range bombers. Tank also assesses the aircraft as too clumsy and not strong enough because the required engines weren't available.

Ludwig Roselius, chairman and 46% majority shareholder of Focke-Wulf via Kaffee HAG, and Barbara Goette - his closest confidante - met with Tank in the Marcus-Allee, Bremen on many occasions.

=== World War II ===
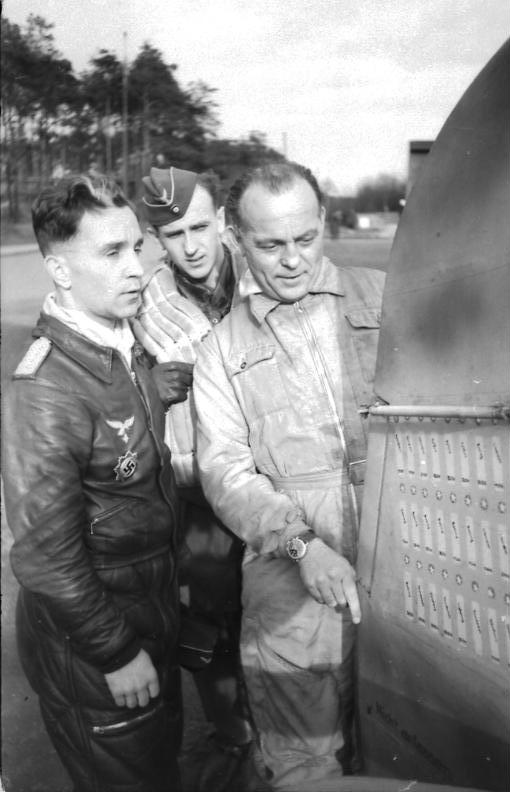
Major Günther Specht (left) and Kurt Tank (right)

In 1944, the Reichsluftfahrtministerium (German Air Ministry) decided that new fighter aircraft designations must include the chief designer's name. Kurt Tank's new designs were therefore given the prefix Ta. His most notable late-war design was the high-speed/high-altitude Ta 152 single-engine fighter, a continuation of the Fw 190 design.

When the war was almost ending, the US Army captured Bad Eilsen and discovered Tank still working along with 2,000 engineers. Colonel Marco Ferrari found a letter written by Tank proposing the construction of more fighters. Ferrari told Tank the Combined Bomber Offensive might just have failed if the Germans had built more fighters and heeded Tank's recommendation.

=== Postwar ===
After the war, Tank negotiated for an employment position with the United Kingdom, with the Nationalist government of China, and with representatives of the Soviet Union. The British government decided not to offer him a contract on the grounds that they could not see how he could be integrated into a research project or design group.

When those negotiations proved unsuccessful, he accepted an offer from Argentina to work at its aerotechnical institute, the Instituto Aerotécnico in Córdoba under the name of Pedro Matthies.

Tank moved to Córdoba in central Argentina in late 1946, with many of his Focke-Wulf co-workers. He also reportedly recommended Ronald Richter, who proposed to power airplanes with nuclear energy, to the Argentine officials. Richter would later be involved in the Huemul Project, which was eventually proven to be a fraud.

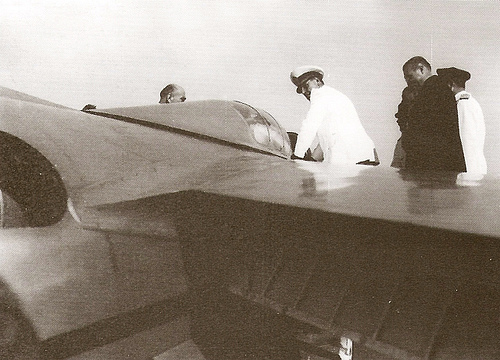
Tank (left, barely visible) exhibiting the IAe 33 to President Perón (center, in white uniform) c. 1951

The Instituto Aerotécnico later became Argentina's military aeroplane factory, the Fábrica Militar de Aviones. While there, Tank designed the IAe Pulqui II based on the Focke-Wulf Ta 183 design that had reached mock-up stage by the end of World War II; it was a state-of-the-art design for its day, but the project was cancelled after the fall of President Juan Perón in 1955. When Perón fell from power, the ex-Focke-Wulf team dispersed, with many, including Tank, moving to India.

First he worked as Director of the Madras Institute of Technology, where one of his students was future President of India Abdul Kalam, who went on to design the indigenous Satellite Launch Vehicle (SLV) and lead the Integrated Guided Missile Development Programme. Tank later joined Hindustan Aeronautics, where he designed the Hindustan Marut fighter-bomber, the first military aircraft constructed in India. The first prototype flew in 1961, and the Marut was retired from active service in 1985. Tank left Hindustan Aeronautics in 1967 and by the 1970s, he had returned to live in West Berlin, basing himself in Germany for the rest of his life. He worked as a consultant for MBB.

== Death ==
He died in Munich in 1983.

== Bibliography ==
- Wagner, Wolfgang (18 March 1998). The History of German Aviation: Kurt Tank. Focke-Wulf's Designer and Test Pilot. Translated by Cox, Don. Atglen, Pennsylvania: Schiffer Military/Aviation History. ISBN 9780764306440.
