= Akaflieg Berlin =

Skyports
- Type: Non-profit
- Genre: Aviation research
- Founded: 1920
- Headquarters: Technische Hochschule,, Germany
- Website: akaflieg-berlin.de

Akaflieg Berlin is one of around thirteen flying groups, or Akaflieg, currently attached to German universities. Akaflieg Berlin, is the abbreviation of Akademische Fliegergruppe Berlin e.V. (Academic Aviator Group Berlin), a group of students enrolled at several Berlin universities, though they are mainly from TU Berlin, who are involved with the development and the design of gliders, as well as research in aerodynamics. Founded in 1920 Akaflieg Berlin is one of the oldest gliding clubs in Germany, flying their gliders from Kammermark airfield near Pritzwalk, which they share with the AFV Berlin (Akademische Fliegervereinigung Berlin e.V.), which mainly consists of former members of Akaflieg Berlin, jokingly referred to as the “elderly ladies and gentlemen”. As at 2007/2008 Akaflieg Berlin was the executive group of the Idaflieg (Interessengemeinschaft deutscher akademischer Fliegergruppen e.V.), the controlling body for all German university flying groups.

Akaflieg Berlin currently has three two-seaters: a Grob G-103 Twin III and two of its own designs, the Akaflieg Berlin B12 and the Akaflieg Berlin B13. It further operates a Schempp-Hirth Discus and a Schleicher ASW 24.

Akaflieg Berlin has undertaken the following development projects:-

Akaflieg Berlin B1 Charlotte
1922, single-seat glider, tailless, shoulder-wing, two skids, all-wood

Akaflieg Berlin B2 Teufelchen
1923, single-seat glider, cantilever shoulder-wing, all-wood

Akaflieg Berlin B3 Charlotte II
1923, single-seat glider, air brakes, one skid, otherwise like B1

Akaflieg Berlin B4 F.F.
1931, single-seat engined aeroplane, 20 HP, high-wing, all wood body, cloth covered retractable wings

Akaflieg Berlin B5
1937, single-seat performance glider, cantilevered gull-wings, retractable landing-gear, all-moving-tail, dive air-brakes, all-wood

Akaflieg Berlin B6
1938, single-seat performance glider, cantilevered mid-wing aeroplane with Junkers-flaps, retractable landing gear, all moving tail, dive air brakes, wood and steel body

Akaflieg Berlin B7
This 1939 project was a two-seater performance glider, planned, but not built.

Akaflieg Berlin B8
Designed and built in 1939 for the Olympic games glider competition in Rome, this single-seat performance glider, was built to meet the specifications of the Olympia tender (the competition to design a glider for the 1940 Olympic Games). With cantilever shoulder-wing, dive air-brakes and all wood construction, the B8 was constructed in 2 versions with variations in dihedral. The Olympic competition was ultimately won by the DFS Meise.

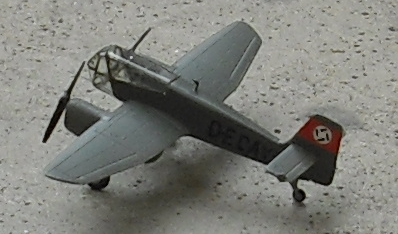
B9 (Model)

Akaflieg Berlin B 9
Designed in 1943, the B9 was a two-seater twin-engined experimental aeroplane for high-g-flights, with a cantilever low-wing, retractable landing gear and 2 x 105 HP engines. The B9 was intended to research the effects of high-g flight with the pilot lying in a prone position, being assigned the RLM designation 8-341.

Akaflieg Berlin B10
Conceived in 1944, this two-seated twin-engined amphibian didn't pass the design stage.

Akaflieg Berlin B11
Designed in 1963, the B11 was a single-seat tail less performance glider with negative wing-sweep. Construction of the prototype was not completed due to faulty design.

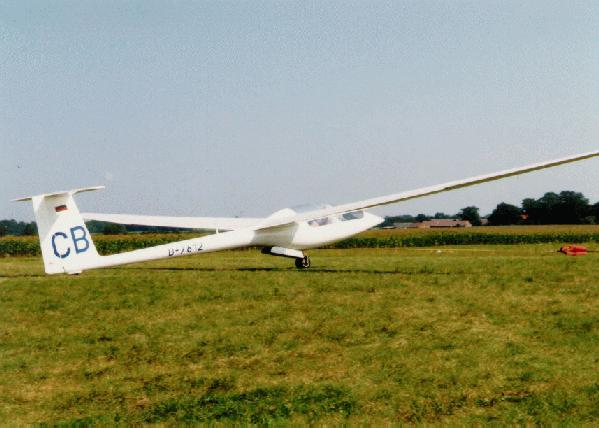
B12

Akaflieg Berlin B12
The B 12 is a two-seated epoxy-glass-resin performance glider with the seats in tandem. The main aim of the project was the optimisation of the aerodynamics of the fuselage at high speeds. The B12 has flaps and a retractable landing-gear and is still used by the group for performance flights and contests. The maiden flight was in 1977 at Ehlershausen near Hannover and the measured glide-ratio (Idaflieg-summer-meeting 1978) is 40.5.

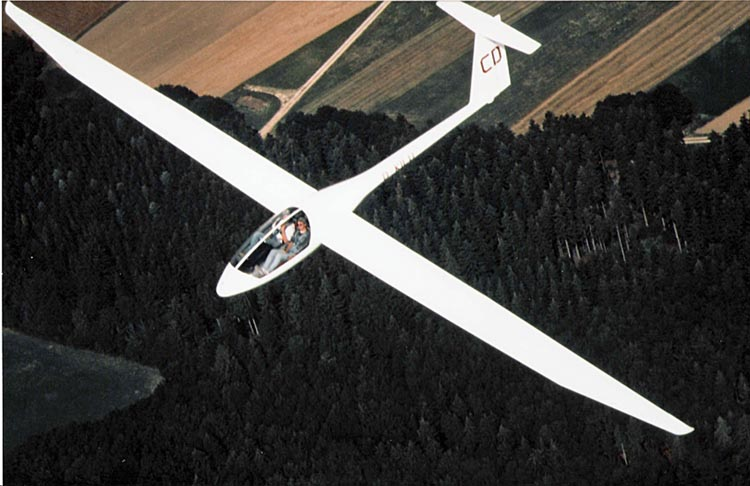
B13

Akaflieg Berlin B13
The B13 is a two-seater epoxy-carbon-resin electric motor glider with the seats positioned side-by-side. The wing span is 23.2 m and the measured glide-ratio (Idaflieg-summer-meeting 1992) is 46.5. The wing profile is a modified flap-HQ-41-profile. Developed in the eighties, the B13 had its successful maiden flight in 1991 at Strausberg near Berlin. After the integration of the 33hp (24.5kW)Rotax engine, an innovative brushless linear induction motor was substituted, powered by energy from renewable sources using fuel cells and solar technology.

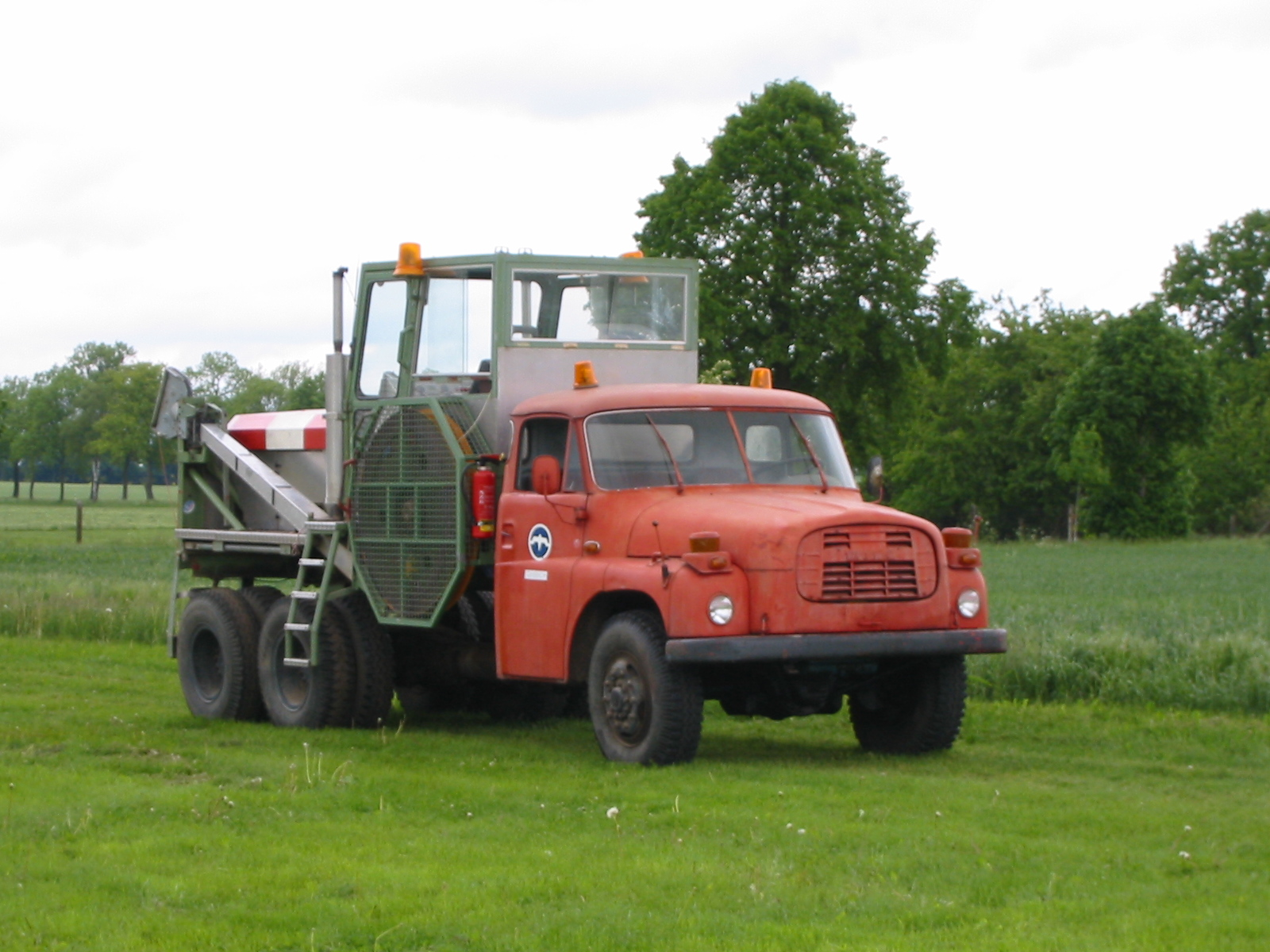
Glider launch winch of the Akaflieg Berlin

Glider launch winch
Because of the high take-off weight of the B13, the group decided in 1984 to design and construct a new more powerful winch to launch their gliders. Daimler-Benz donated a 320 HP 10-cylinder diesel engine including an axle and cable drums. In addition to achieving a higher performance, the project's aim was to make winch launching safer for modern gliders which have higher minimum speeds during a winch launch, especially on days when there is no wind or even a light tail-wind. By using big azimuth rollers and inclined inlet guides, the winch is designed to minimize the bending of the cable under load. The groups also designed automatic process controls for the pneumatically driven gearbox actuators;mounted on an all-wheel drive Tatra 148 chassis, the winch was finished in 1994 and has operated with Dyneema-plastics cables since 2004.
