= Akaflieg Berlin B12 =

German two-seat glider, 1977

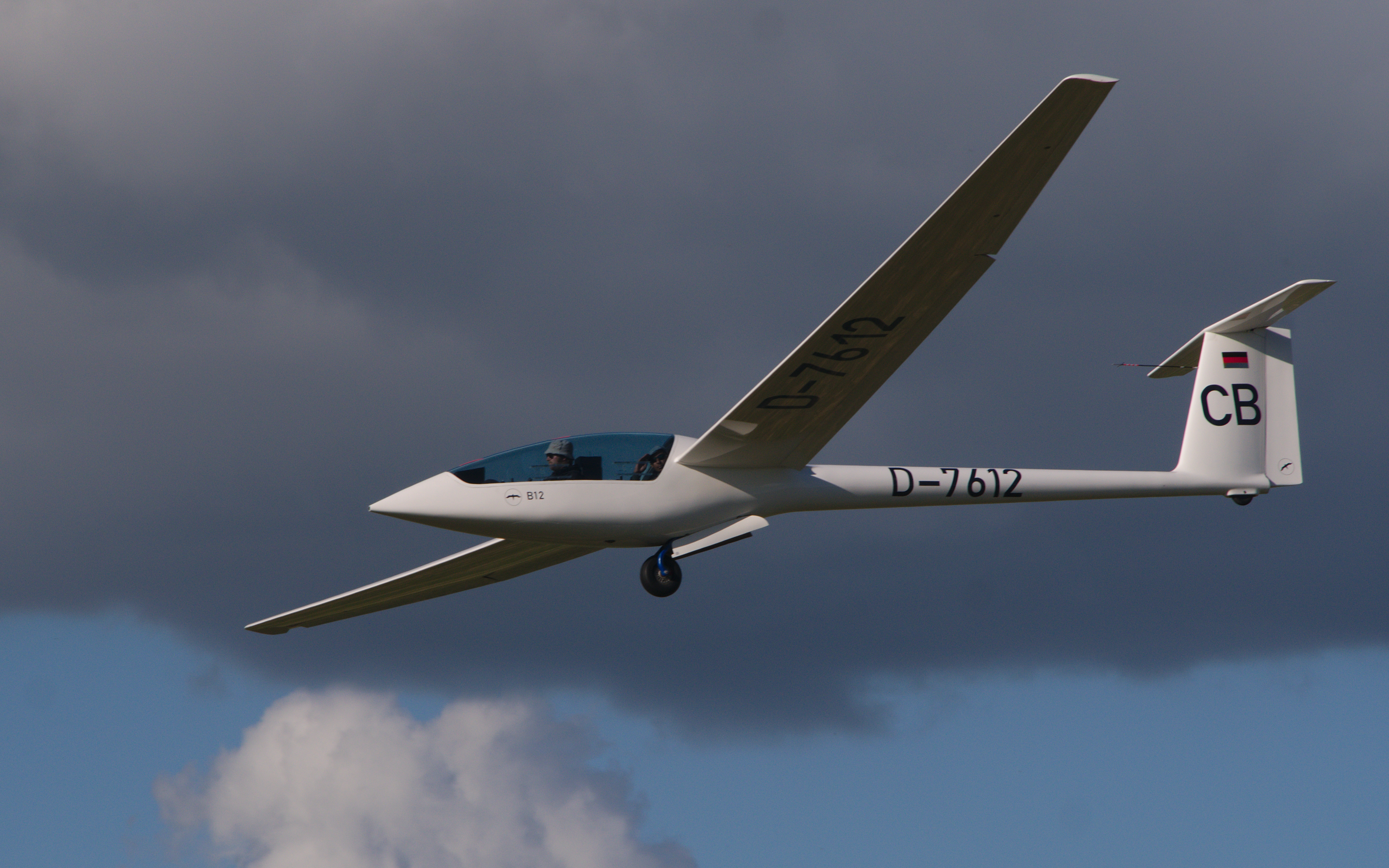

General information
- Type: Two place glider aircraft
- National origin: Germany
- Manufacturer: Akaflieg Berlin
- Primary user: Akaflieg Berlin
- Number built: 1

History
- First flight: B12:27 July 1977; B12T:11 August 1987

The Akaflieg Berlin B12 is a high performance two-place glider aircraft that was designed and built in Germany. Conceived as a research vehicle, only one unit was constructed.

== Development ==
The students at Akaflieg Berlin set out to improve the performance of modern gliders by reducing drag. To improve a modern glider's performance through modifying the aerofoil sections is time-consuming and very costly, so to reduce costs the group utilised production wings from a Schempp-Hirth Janus B, shortened to 18.2m (59.71 feet), allowing the students to concentrate their efforts and budget on improving the fuselage.

The shape and profiles of the new fuselage were developed at the Institut für Luftfahrzeugbau (Institute for aircraft industry) and a new two-seat fuselage was constructed using contemporary GFRP (Glass-fibre Re-inforced Plastic) techniques in a monocoque shell.

== Construction ==
Built principally from GFRP the B12 uses monocoque construction, avoiding the use of a welded steel-tube core structure, maximising the volume available for crew accommodation and payloads such as research instrumentation. The cockpit seats two in tandem under large plexiglas canopies with the instructor seat, in the rear, set at a higher level to improve his forward view.

The wings are standard 'Janus B' items built using identical construction methods. The empennage originally utilised a cruciform tail using an NACA 0009-64 aerofoil section formed with ' Rohacell'/GFRP sandwich supported by CFRP (Carbon-Fibre Re-inforced Plastic) spars. After a trailer accident during road transport in 1986, which destroyed the rear fuselage and tail-unit, a T-tail was fitted during repairs. A thicker aerofoil section was used for the vertical tail of this revised unit, a specially developed Wortmann FX-71 L 150/30 profile.

The single retractable main undercarriage wheel is supported on a tall leg assembly which was originally built with electric actuation, but after a field landing with a flat battery caused a wheels-up landing a manual system was fitted. A rubber tail skid, capped with hardened steel, under the rear fuselage completes the undercarriage. In the original fuselage a braking parachute, used for approach control, was housed at the extreme rear, but this feature was not carried through to the replacement tailcone during its rebuild.

== History ==
After the first flight of the B12 on 27 July 1977, piloted by Jürgen Ehlers Thorbeck, the B12 was used for research, cross country and competition flying until a trailer accident in 1986, whilst being transported by road, destroyed the tail section and twisted the rear fuselage. Repairs were carried out and the B12 was flying again on 1 August 1987 at the IDAFLIEG ( Interessengemeinschaft deutscher akademischer Fliegergruppen e.V. - interest group for academic flying groups) summer camp at Aalen-Elchingen, sporting a T-tail identical to that of the Akaflieg Berlin B13. The B12 continues to fly but rarely emerges from the hangar unless the soaring weather is good.

== Flying ==
Flying the B12 requires a certain amount of care, due to:

high nose-up seating position
tall undercarriage, which reduces forward view at low ground roll speeds
high-mounted wings with significant dihedral, which makes ground-handling awkward
the ailerons are relatively ineffective
control pressures are large, causing pilot fatigue
rigging and de-rigging of the aircraft are complicated and strenuous, requiring several ground-handlers
high weight causes high wing loading, reducing thermalling performance (i.e. rate of climb).

Once the quirks and foibles of the B12 are understood it is possible to compete effectively with other contemporary two-seaters. However the expected performance gains were only partly realised and the B12 does not rank with the highest performance gliders, as was hoped. One quirk is the B12 'sigh' which can be heard in certain flight conditions, the origin of which remains a mystery. Competition flying is carried out with the call-sign CB and a handicap index of 106 is applied. The aircraft carries registration 'D-7612'.

== Variants ==
B12
The original aircraft built with a cruciform style tail unit using a NACA 0009-64 aerofoil section.
B12T
Designation of the aircraft once re-built, after a trailer accident, with a t-tail using a specially developed Wortmann FX-71 L 150/30 aerofoil section.

== Specifications (B12T) ==
Data from Jane's All the World's Aircraft 1988-89

General characteristics

- Crew: 2
- Length: 8.67 m (28 ft 5 in)
- Wingspan: 18.2 m (59 ft 9 in)
- Height: 1.79 m (5 ft 10 in)
- Wing area: 16.58 m^{2} (178.5 sq ft)
- Aspect ratio: 19.97
- Airfoil: Wortmann FX-67-K-170 (root), Wortmann FX-67-K-150 (tip)
- Empty weight: 438 kg (966 lb)
- Max takeoff weight: 620 kg (1,367 lb)

Performance

- Stall speed: 73 km/h (45 mph, 39 kn)
- Never exceed speed: 250 km/h (160 mph, 130 kn)
- g limits: +6 to -4g
- Maximum glide ratio: 40.5
- Rate of sink: 0.68 m/s (134 ft/min) at 90 km/h (56 mph; 49 kn)
- Wing loading: 37.4 kg/m^{2} (7.7 lb/sq ft)

== See also ==
Related development

- Schempp-Hirth Janus B

Aircraft of comparable role, configuration, and era

- Akaflieg Braunschweig SB-10 Schirokko
