= Akaflieg Berlin B4 F.F. =

1930s German light aircraft

B4 F.F.
- The B4 over Johannisthal

General information
- Type: Light aircraft
- National origin: Germany
- Manufacturer: Akaflieg Berlin
- Designer: Walter Stender, dr. Martin Schrenk and Gerald Klein
- Number built: 1

History
- First flight: December 1931

The Akaflieg Berlin B4 F.F. was a single-seat aircraft built in Germany in the early 1930s. It was a high-wing monoplane of all-wood construction with fabric-covered foldable wings

== Design and development ==
In 1931 the Deutsche Luftfahrt-Verband e.V. (DLV) opened a competition for an inexpensive light aircraft. Two entries were put forward; Akaflieg Berlin's B4 F.F. (D-2229) and Dipl.-Ing. Hermann Mayer's MM-1 (D-2230), with both aircraft exhibited at the 1932 Deutschen Luftsport-Ausstellung (DELA) in Berlin.

Like the Mayer MM-1 the B4 F.F. was constructed at the DLV workshops in Adlershof. Design took eight months and construction a further nine.

== Specifications (B4 F.F.) ==
Data from

General characteristics

- Length: 5.7 m (18 ft 8 in)
- Wingspan: 9 m (29 ft 6 in)
- Height: 2.4 m (7 ft 10 in)
- Wing area: 10 m^{2} (110 sq ft)
- Aspect ratio: 8
- Empty weight: 185 kg (408 lb)
- Gross weight: 285 kg (628 lb)
- Powerplant: 1 × Daimler F7502 , 15 kW (20 hp)
- Propellers: 2-bladed fixed-pitch propeller

Performance

- Maximum speed: 125 km/h (78 mph, 67 kn)
- Service ceiling: 3,500 m (11,500 ft)
- g limits: +8 (ultimate load factor)
- Wing loading: 28.5 kg/m^{2} (5.8 lb/sq ft)
- Power/mass: 19.18 kg/kW (31.53 lb/hp)
