= BMW 139 =

Experimental German aircraft engine developed by BMW

Overview
- Manufacturer: BMW

Layout
- Configuration: Radial-14
- Displacement: 55.4 L (3,380.7 cu in)

Combustion
- Cooling system: Air-cooled

Dimensions
- Diameter: 1,290 millimetres (51 in)
- Dry weight: 852 kilograms (1,878 lb)

Chronology
- Predecessor: BMW 132
- Successor: BMW 801

The BMW 139 was an experimental 14-cylinder two-row radial engine developed by BMW in 1935. The purpose of the engine was to power the Focke-Wulf Fw 190, however it only saw use in the prototype Focke-Wulf Fw-190 V1. It had a displacement of 55.4 L (3,380.4 cubic inches) and produced 1,529 horsepower.

== Design and development ==
In 1929, BMW acquired a license to produce the 9-cylinder Pratt & Whitney R-1690 Hornet as the BMW 114. From there the design underwent several improvements by the German maker, including direct fuel injection, an improved cylinder design, a higher compression ratio, a stronger crankshaft, and a new supercharger. This updated design would go into production as the BMW 132.

The BMW 139 was an attempt to join two of these BMW 132 engines to produce a 14-cylinder engine for a ministerial competition to compete with a design by Siemens-Bramo. However, Bramo was bought out by BMW and the two projects were merged. The 139 was initially intended to be used in similar roles as smaller engines such as the Daimler-Benz DB 601 and Junkers Jumo 211, but it was suggested by Kurt Tank, the engine's designer, that it be used in the Fw 190 project. While radial engines were rare in land-based fighters due to their large size causing increased drag, Tank believed it could be streamlined to minimize this downside.

However, by the time the Fw 190 went into production, the Focke-Wulf's designers believed the BMW 139 was outdated, leading to a redesign dubbed the BMW 801. While the BMW 801 was heavier and longer, increasing the weight of the Fw 190 and requiring a larger wingspan, it had a slightly higher horsepower of 1,600 and more potential for growth.

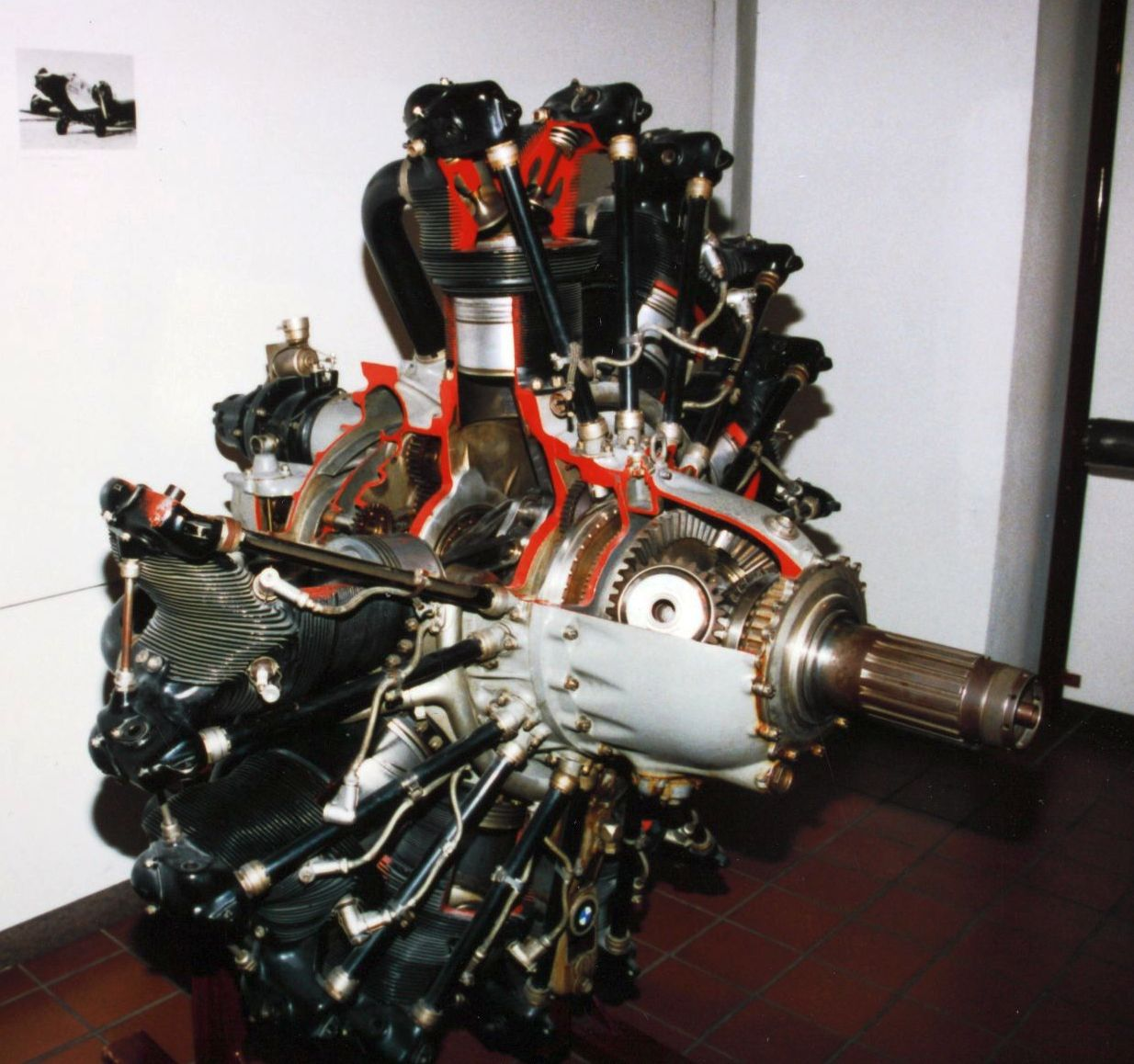
The predecessor BMW 132, located at the Deutsches Museum, Munich. This particular engine was used in a Junkers Ju 52 transport aircraft.

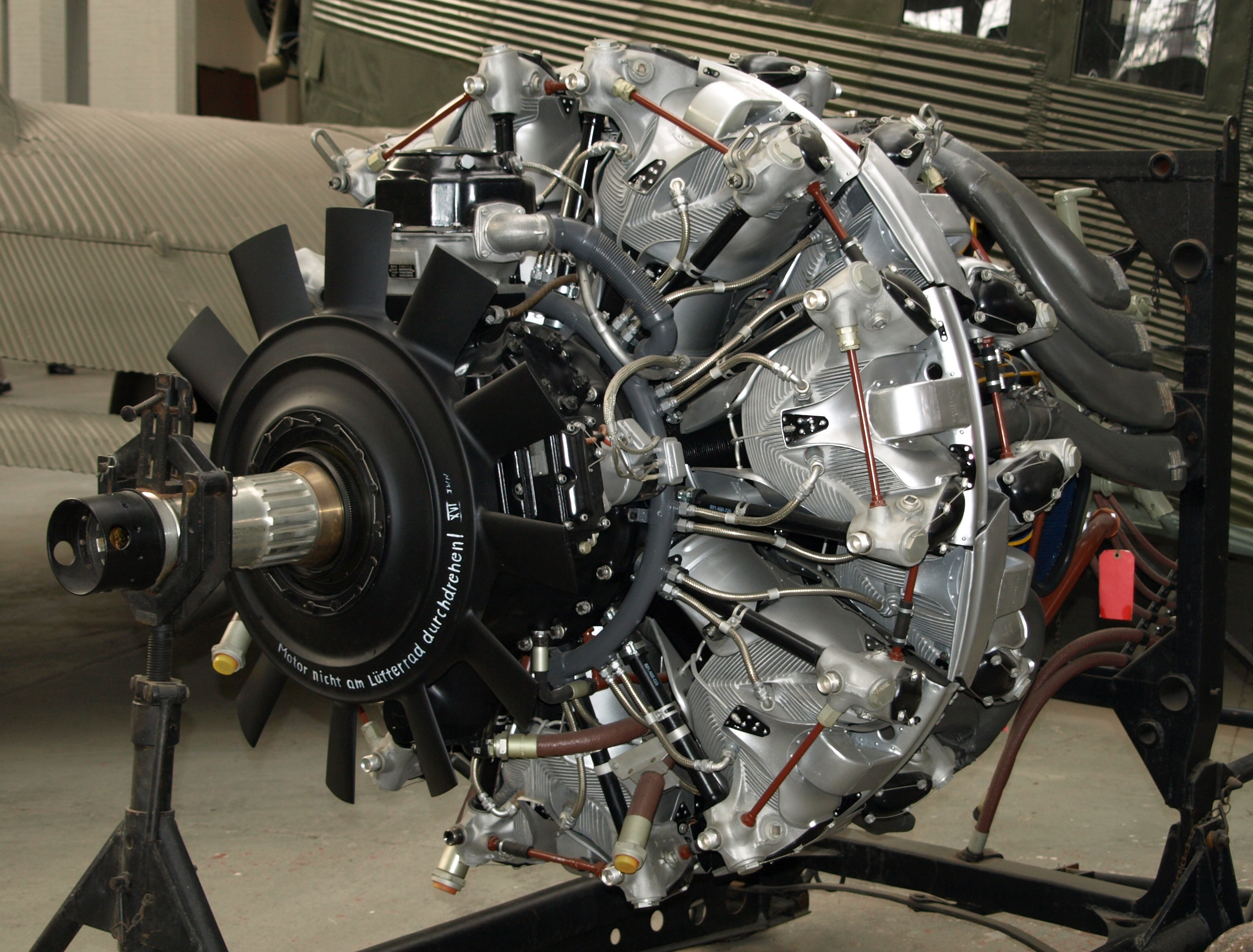
The BMW 139's successor, the BMW 801, on display at the Imperial War Museum Duxford.

== Use in testing ==
The only actual use of the BMW 139 was in the first four prototypes of the Focke-Wulf 190, designated Fw 190 V1, V2, V3, and V4. Kurt Tank, also the designer of the Focke-Wulf, believed a radial engine would be the best choice for the new fighter for three main reasons. First, an air-cooled radial engine would be less vulnerable than a liquid-cooled engine because of the fragility of liquid cooling systems when hit by enemy fire. Second, despite its larger size and greater weight, it offered more power and suffered less drag penalties than a liquid-cooled engine. Lastly, the use of a radial engine would place less stress on the production lines already taken up by the production of the Daimler-Benz DB 601 and Junkers Jumo 211.

The first test flight of the Fw 190 V1 using the BMW 139 took place on June 1, 1939. During the flight, chief test pilot Flugkapitän Hans Sander noted that the engine overheated frequently. The air cooling system worked by pulling air through the small central orifice of the engine cowling but this proved to be inadequate. This would be one of the reasons for its replacement with the BMW 801 after only two flights.

== See also ==
Related development

- BMW 132
- BMW 801

Related lists

- List of aircraft engines
