= BMW 801 =

German aircraft engine developed by BMW during World War II

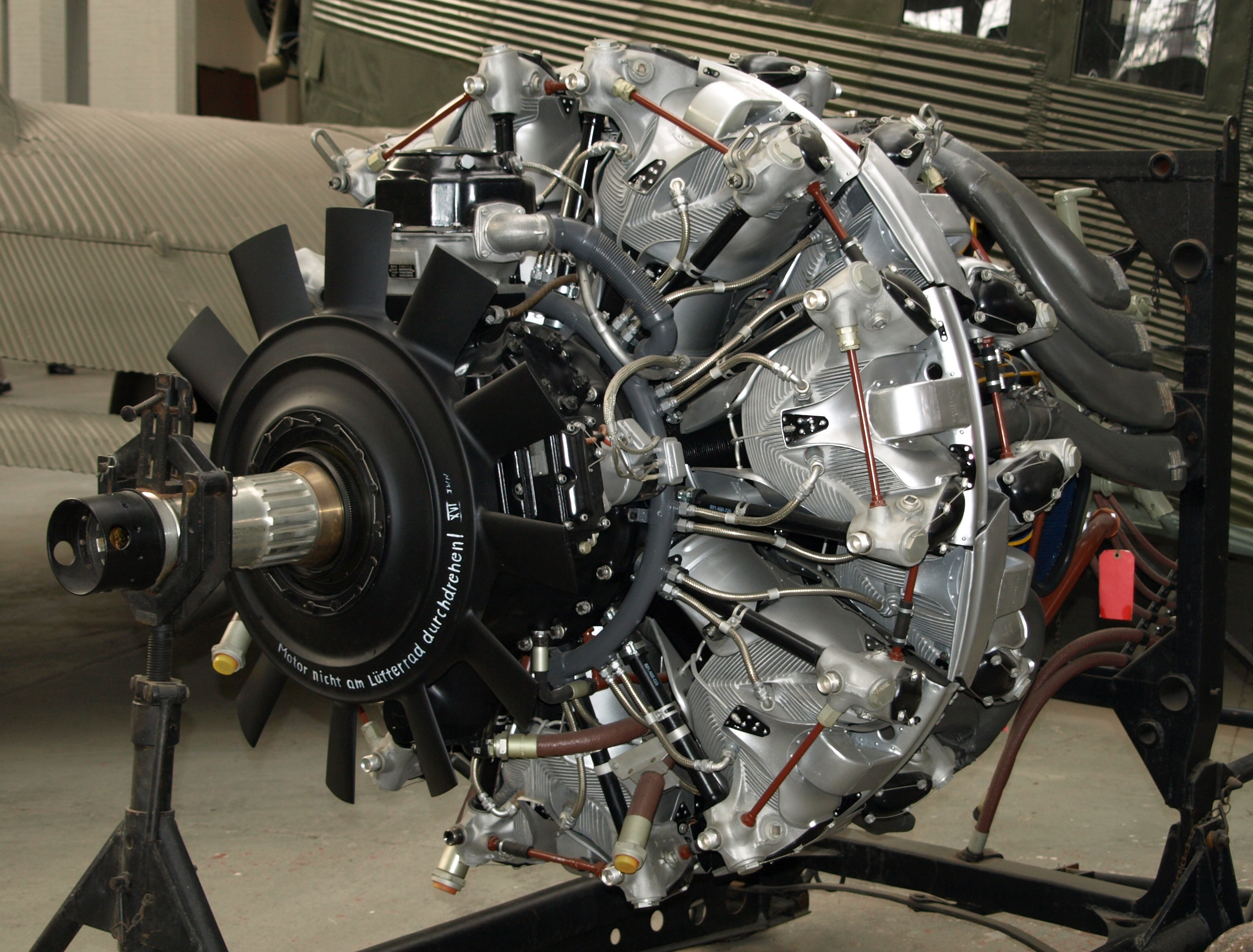
- BMW 801D on display at the Imperial War Museum Duxford
- Type: Piston radial aircraft engine
- National origin: Germany
- Manufacturer: BMW
- First run: 1939
- Major applications: Focke-Wulf Fw 190; Junkers Ju 88
- Number built: more than 61,000
- Developed into: BMW 802; BMW 803

The BMW 801 was a German 41.8-litre (2,550 cu in) air-cooled 14-cylinder-radial aircraft engine built by BMW and used in a number of German Luftwaffe aircraft of World War II. Production versions of the twin-row engine generated between 1,560 and 2,000 PS (1,540–1,970 hp, or 1,150–1,470 kW). It was the most produced radial engine of Germany in World War II with more than 61,000 built.

The 801 was originally intended to replace existing radial types in German transport and utility aircraft. At the time, it was widely agreed among European designers that an inline engine was a requirement for high performance designs due to its smaller frontal area and resulting lower drag. Kurt Tank successfully fitted a BMW 801 to a new fighter design he was working on, and as a result the 801 became best known as the power plant for the famous Focke-Wulf Fw 190. The BMW 801 radial also pioneered the use of what would today be designated an engine control unit: its Kommandogerät engine management system took over the operation of several aviation engine management control parameters of the era, allowing proper operation of the engine with just one throttle lever.

== Design and development ==
=== Precursor design ===
In the 1930s, BMW took out a license to build the Pratt & Whitney Hornet engines. By the mid-30s they had introduced an improved version, the BMW 132. The BMW 132 was widely used, most notably on the Junkers Ju 52, which it powered for much of that design's lifetime.

In 1935 the RLM funded prototypes of two much larger radial designs, one from Bramo, the Bramo 329, and another from BMW, the BMW 139. BMW's design used many components from the BMW 132 to create a two-row engine with 14 cylinders, supplying 1,550 PS (1,529 hp, 1,140 kW). After BMW bought Bramo in 1939 both projects were merged into the BMW 801, learning from the problems encountered in both projects.

The BMW 139 was originally intended to be used in roles similar to those of the other German radials, namely bombers and transport aircraft, but midway through the program the Focke-Wulf firm's chief designer, Kurt Tank suggested it for use in the Focke-Wulf Fw 190 fighter project. Radial engines were rare in European designs as they were considered to have too large a frontal area for good streamlining and would not be suitable for high speed aircraft. They were most popular on naval aircraft, where their easier maintenance and improved reliability were highly valued. Efforts to improve these designs led to new cowling designs that reduced the concerns about drag. Tank felt that attention to detail could result in a streamlined radial that would not suffer undue drag, and would be competitive with inlines.

The main concern was providing cooling air over the cylinder heads, which generally required a very large opening at the front of the aircraft. Tank's solution for the BMW 139 was to use an engine-driven fan behind an oversized, flow-through hollow prop-spinner open at the extreme front, blowing air past the engine cylinders, with some of it being drawn through S-shaped ducts over a radiator for oil cooling. However this system proved almost impossible to operate properly with the BMW 139; early prototypes of the Fw 190 demonstrated terrible cooling problems. Although the problems appeared to be fixable, since the engine was already fairly dated in terms of design, in 1938 BMW proposed an entirely new engine designed specifically for fan-cooling that could be brought to production quickly.

=== 801 emerges ===
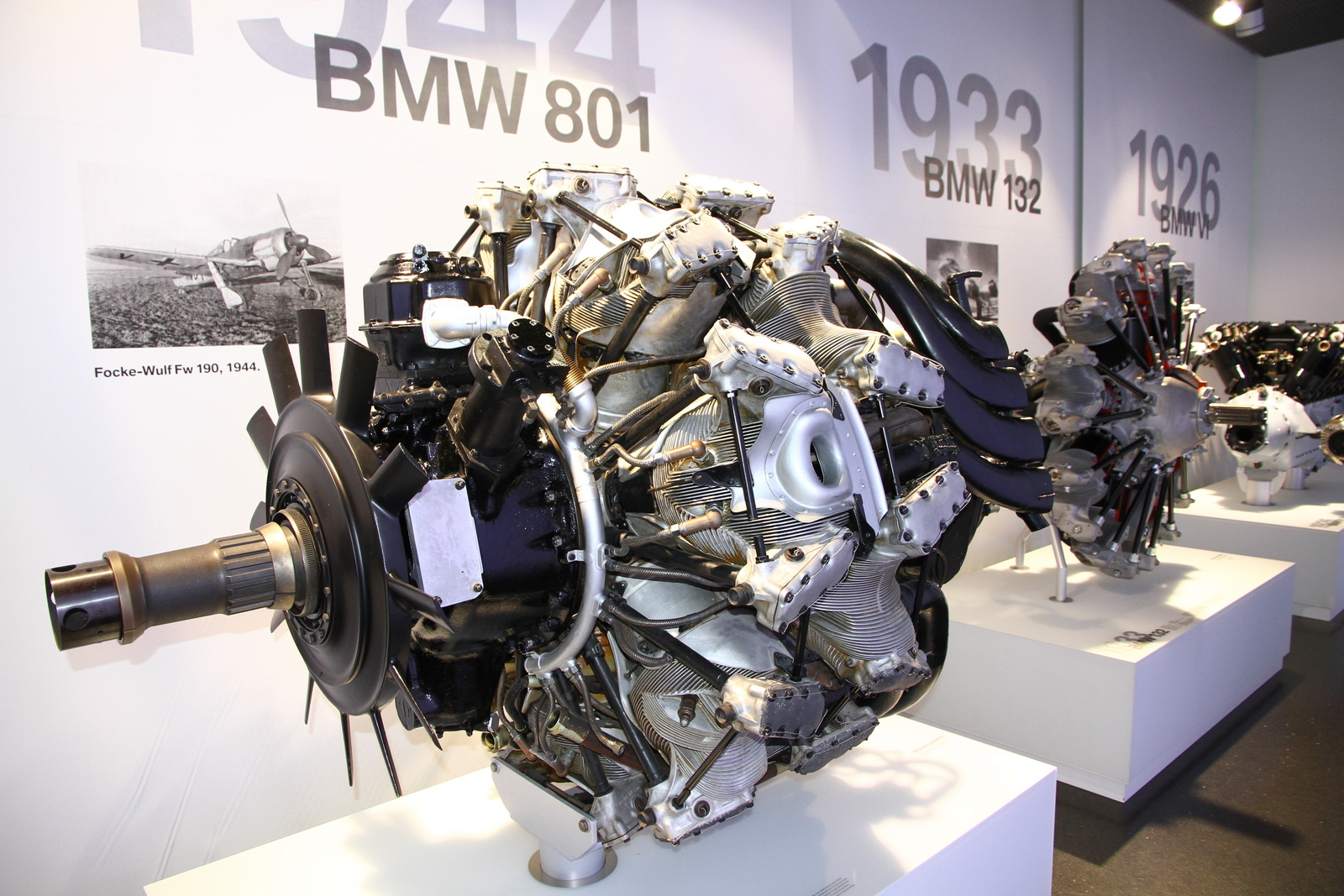
BMW 801 engine, BMW Museum, Munich, Germany (2013)

The new design was given the name BMW 801 after BMW was given a new block of "109-800" engine numbers by the RLM to use after their merger with Bramo. The 801 retained the 139's older-style single-valve intake and exhaust, while most in-line engines of the era had moved to either three (as Junkers had done) or four valves per cylinder, or in British use for their own radials, sleeve valves. Several minor advances were worked into the design, including the use of sodium-cooled valves and a direct fuel injection system, manufactured by Friedrich Deckel AG of Munich.

The supercharger was rather basic in the early models, using a single-stage two-speed design directly geared to the engine (unlike the DB 601's hydraulically clutched version) which led to rather limited altitude performance, in keeping with its intended medium-altitude usage. One key advancement for the 801 was the Kommandogerät (command-device), a mechanical-hydraulic unit that automatically adjusted engine fuel flow, propeller pitch, supercharger setting, mixture and ignition timing in response to a single throttle lever, dramatically simplifying engine control. The Kommandogerät could be considered to be a precursor to the engine control units used for many vehicles' internal combustion engines of the late 20th and early 21st centuries.

There was a considerable amount of wind tunnel work done on the engine and BMW-designed forward cowling (incorporating the engine's oil cooler) at the Luftfahrtforschungsanstalt (LFA) facility in Völkenrode, leading to the conclusion it was possible to reduce drag equivalent to 150–200 hp (110–150 kW; 150–200 PS). It also maximized the use of positive air pressure to aid cooling of cylinders, heads, and other internal parts.

=== 801A and 801B ===
The first BMW 801As ran in April 1939, only six months after starting work on the design, with production commencing in 1940. The 801B was to be identical to the 801A except for the gearbox, which reversed the direction of the propeller rotation to counterclockwise as seen from behind the engine. The A and B models were intended to be used in pairs on twin-engine designs, cancelling out net torque and making the plane easier to handle. There is no evidence the 801B ever left the prototype stage. The BMW 801A/B engines delivered 1,560 PS (1,539 hp, 1,147 kW) for takeoff. Major applications of the 801A/L engines include multiple variants of the Junkers Ju 88 and Dornier Do 217.

==== 801C and 801L ====
The BMW 801C was developed for use in single- or multi-engined fighters and included a new hydraulic prop control and various changes intended to improve cooling, including cooling "gills" on the cowling behind the engine in place of the original slots. The 801C was almost exclusively used in early variants of the Focke-Wulf Fw 190A. The BMW 801L was an A model with the hydraulic prop control mechanism introduced with the 801C engine. The C and L models delivered the same power as the original A model.

=== 801D-2 and 801G-2 ===
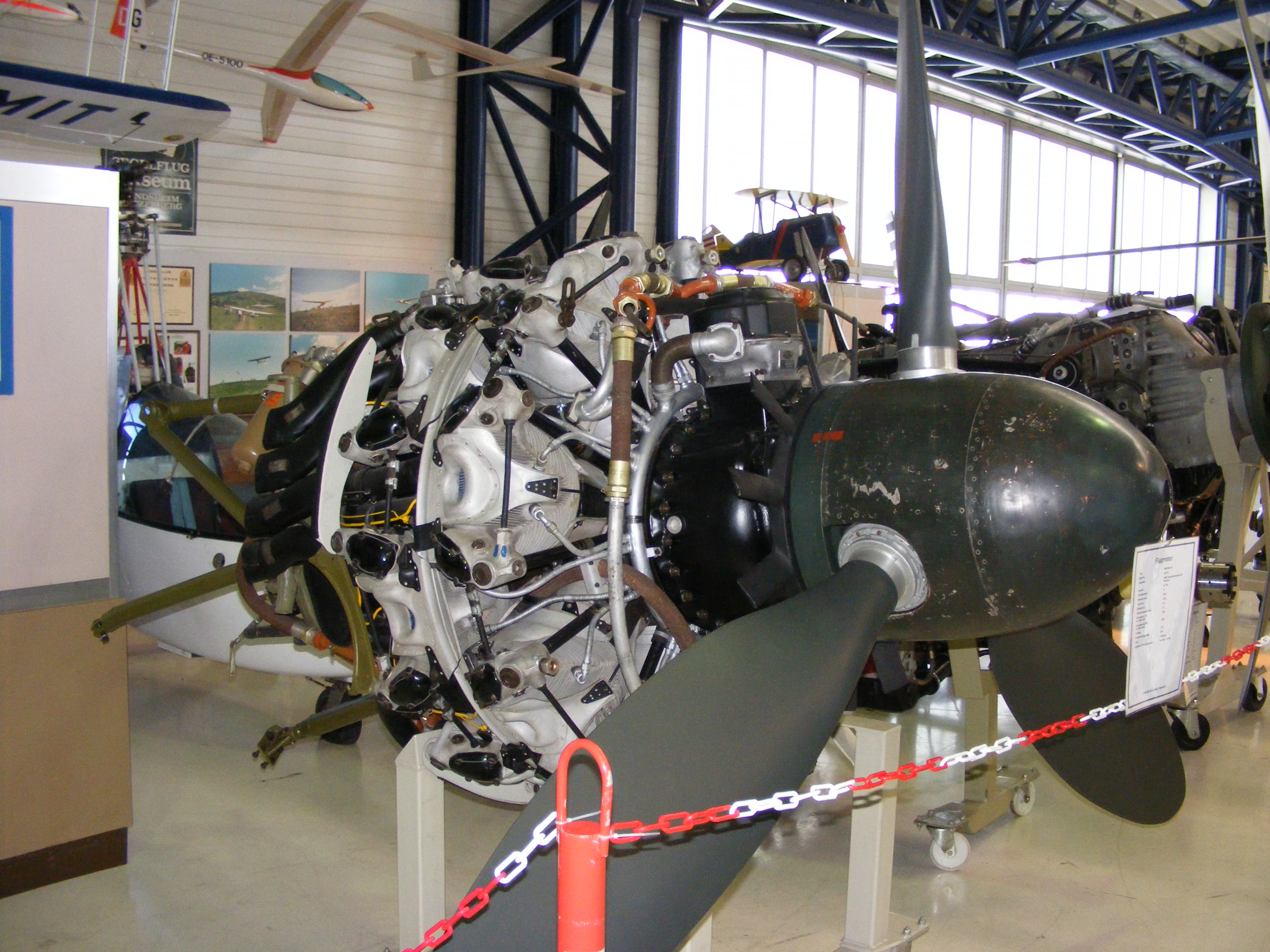
BMW 801 D2 at the Flugmuseum Aviaticum, Austria (2007)

The 801C was replaced with the BMW 801 D-2 series engines in early 1942, which ran on C2/C3 100 octane fuel instead of the A/B/C/L's B4 87 octane, boosting takeoff power to 1,700 PS (1,677 hp, 1,250 kW). The BMW 801G-2 and H-2 models were D-2 engines modified for use in bomber roles with lower gear ratios for driving larger propellers, clockwise and counterclockwise respectively. As with the 801B engine design, however, the 801H-2 engine did not leave the prototype stage.

The newer, 100 octane D-2 series and its derivatives had higher gear ratios, and higher compression ratios, than the earlier, 87 octane versions. The compression ratio of the 100 octane series was raised to 7.2 from the 6.5 of the 87 octane versions. This was possible because of the better fuel and the better (domed) shape of the combustion chamber.

The D-2 models were tested with a system for injecting a 50–50 water-methanol mixture known as MW50 into the supercharger primarily for its anti-detonation effect, allowing the use of increased boost pressures. Secondary effects were cooling of the engine and charge cooling. Some performance was gained, but at the cost of engine service life. This was replaced by a system that injected fuel instead of MW50, known as C3-injection, and this was used until 1944. The serious fuel shortage in 1944 forced installation of MW50 instead of C3-injection. With MW50 boosting turned on, takeoff power increased to 2,000 PS (1,470 kW), the C3-injection was initially only permitted for low altitude use and increased take-off power to 1,870 PS. Later C3-injection systems were permitted for low-to-medium altitude use and raised take-off power to more than 1,900 PS.

=== Supercharger development ===
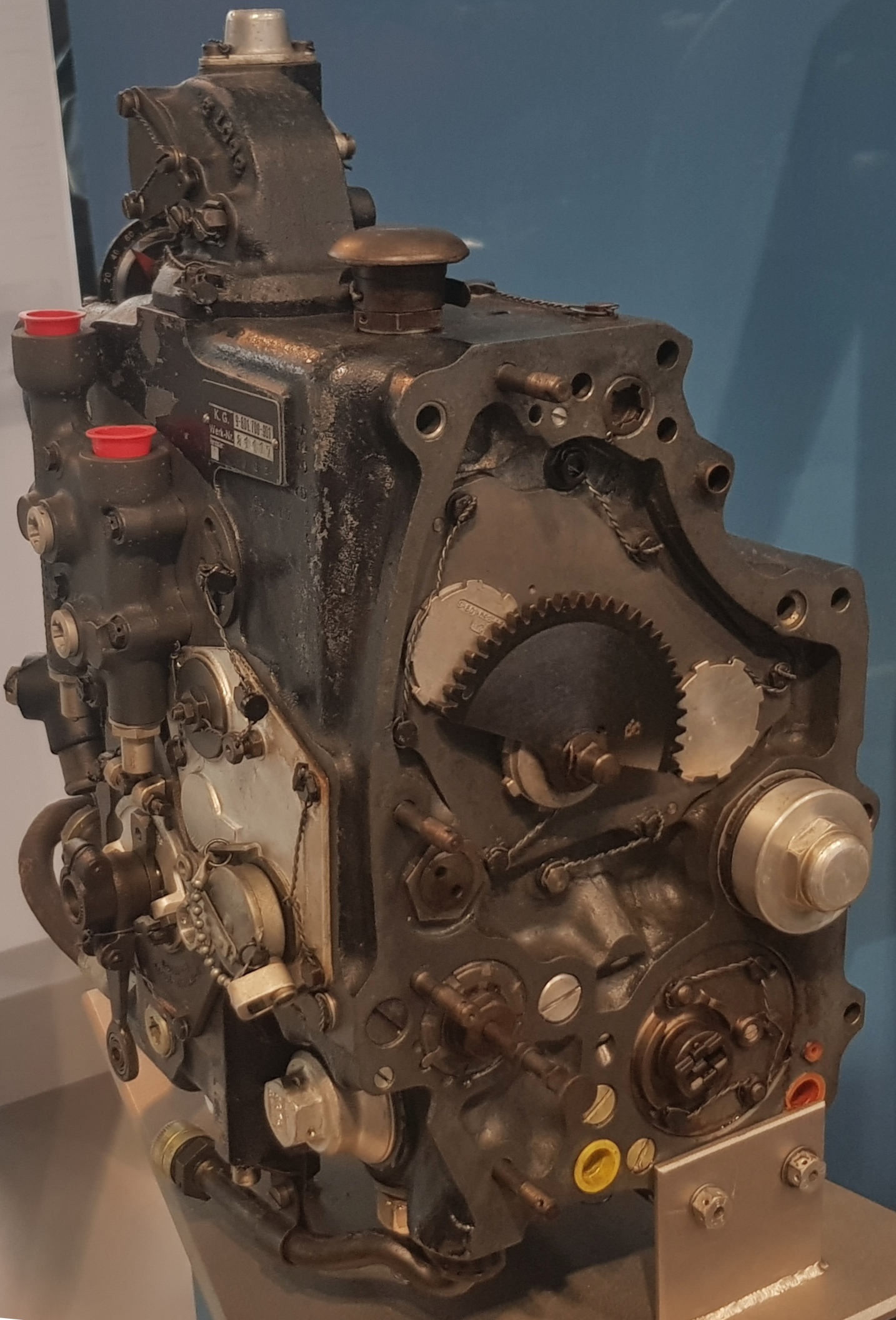
BMW-Kommandogerät, a single-lever power control device for the BMW801, designed by Heinrich Leibach.

With the engine being used in higher-altitude fighter roles, a number of attempts were made to address the limited performance of the original supercharger. The BMW 801E was a modification of the D-2 using different gear ratios, of 6:1 at low speed and 8.3:1 at high speed, that tuned the supercharger for higher altitudes. Although takeoff power was unaffected, cruise power increased over 100 hp (75 kW) and "high power" modes for climb at nearly 1,500 to 1,650 PS; and combat were likewise improved by up to 150 hp (110 kW). The E model was also used as the basis for the BMW 801R, which included a much more complex and powerful two-stage four-speed supercharger, as well as die cast hydronalium cylinder heads, strengthened crankshaft and pistons, and chromed cylinders and exhaust valves; it was anticipated this version would produce over 2,000 hp (1,500 kW; 2,000 PS), or over 2,600 hp (1,900 kW; 2,600 PS) with MW 50 methanol-water injection.

The 801E not only had higher gear ratios, but also had better supercharger internal aerodynamics. In 5-minute overboost, the 801E could provide 2,300 PS on the test stand in 1942.

The 801R, with its 2-stage, 4-speed supercharger, had a critical altitude of 11,000 meters. Above that altitude, the R could use additional boost by nitrous-oxide (GM-1) injection. The R was also bi-fuel. At its critical altitude, the R could deliver 1,400 PS.

In spite of these improvements, the E model was not widely used. Instead, continued improvements to the basic E model led to the BMW 801F, which dramatically improved performance across the board, with takeoff power increasing to 2,400 hp (1,790 kW), making the 801 the only German aviation engine of an existing type that had a producible subtype that could exceed 1,500 kW from a proven military aircraft powerplant. It was planned to use the F on all late-model Fw 190s, but the war ended before production started.

The 801F's supercharger had higher critical altitude, than the earlier D-2 series. The improved gear ratios increased the engine's critical altitude to between 7,000 and 8,000 meters. The 801F also had a stronger crankshaft and a fuel-injector pump of higher capacity. The version also had larger intake- and exhaust-valves, with increased valve-overlap. The engine, in the TF powerplant form also had better internal and external aerodynamics. The supercharger intake was relocated to the wing-root of the Fw 190, to improve supercharging. On the test bench, the 801F could deliver 2,600 PS in 1945.

The 801F was 25 centimeters longer, than the earlier 801 versions. The reason for this was to keep the balance of gravity of the Ta 152 aircraft.

In 1944, the strongest production version of the 801, the 801S went into production. It had the same gear ratios, as the 801E, and it's supercharger used swirl-throttling. It used the parts of the earlier D-2, and in some parts, the above mentioned more advanced versions (E and F). The S also had an improved and simplified master controller and different magneto timing. The 801S also had altered valve-timing. In special-emergency mode, it could deliver 2,200 PS at sea-level.

=== Importance of continued development ===
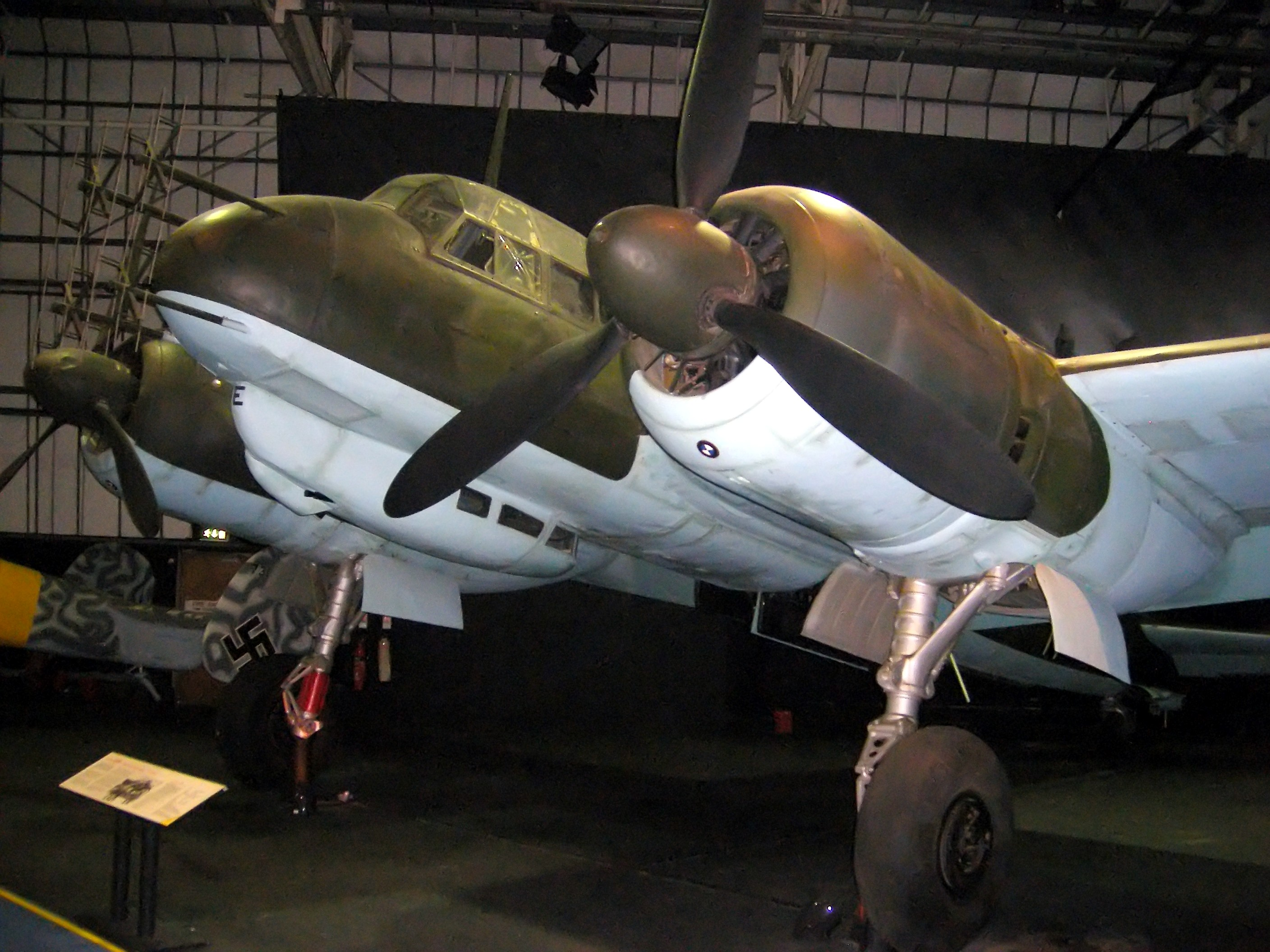
A surviving Ju 88R-1 night fighter with Kraftei unitized-installation BMW 801 engines. Royal Air Force Museum London (2007)

BMW had been required to create priorities for the 14-cylinder production 801 radial, the 18-cylinder BMW 802 and liquid-cooled 28-cylinder BMW 803 radial engines.

The first priority was for the 801 to be developed "to its limits", with the second priority the 802's design and prototype construction, and lastly the complex 803 four-row radial only receiving attention to its design-development.

By contrast, Allied equivalents such as the American Wright Twin Cyclone, and the Soviet Shvetsov ASh-82 radials never needed to be developed beyond 1,500 kW as these nations possessed larger-displacement 18-cylinder radial aviation engines capable of more power.

=== Turbocharger development ===
As just one result of the highest level of priority given to the successful 801 design's further development, a number of attempts were made to use turbochargers on the BMW 801 series as well. The first used a modified BMW 801D to create the BMW 801J, delivering 1,810 PS (1,785 hp, 1,331 kW) at takeoff and 1,500 hp (1,103 kW) at 12,200 m (40,000 ft), an altitude where the D was struggling to produce 630 hp (463 kW). The BMW 801E was likewise modified to create the BMW 801Q, delivering a superb 1,715 hp (1,261 kW) at 12,200 m (40,000 ft).

The turbocharger was fitted behind the engine at a 30° forward tilt off a vertical axis, possessed hollow turbine blades in the exhaust section, and in a photo from Flight magazine, appears to have intercooler units fitted around the inner circumference of the rear cowl, just behind the rear row of cylinders.

Not many of these engines ever entered production due to high costs, and the various high-altitude designs based on them were forced to turn to other engines, typically the Junkers Jumo 213.

=== Surviving and operational examples ===
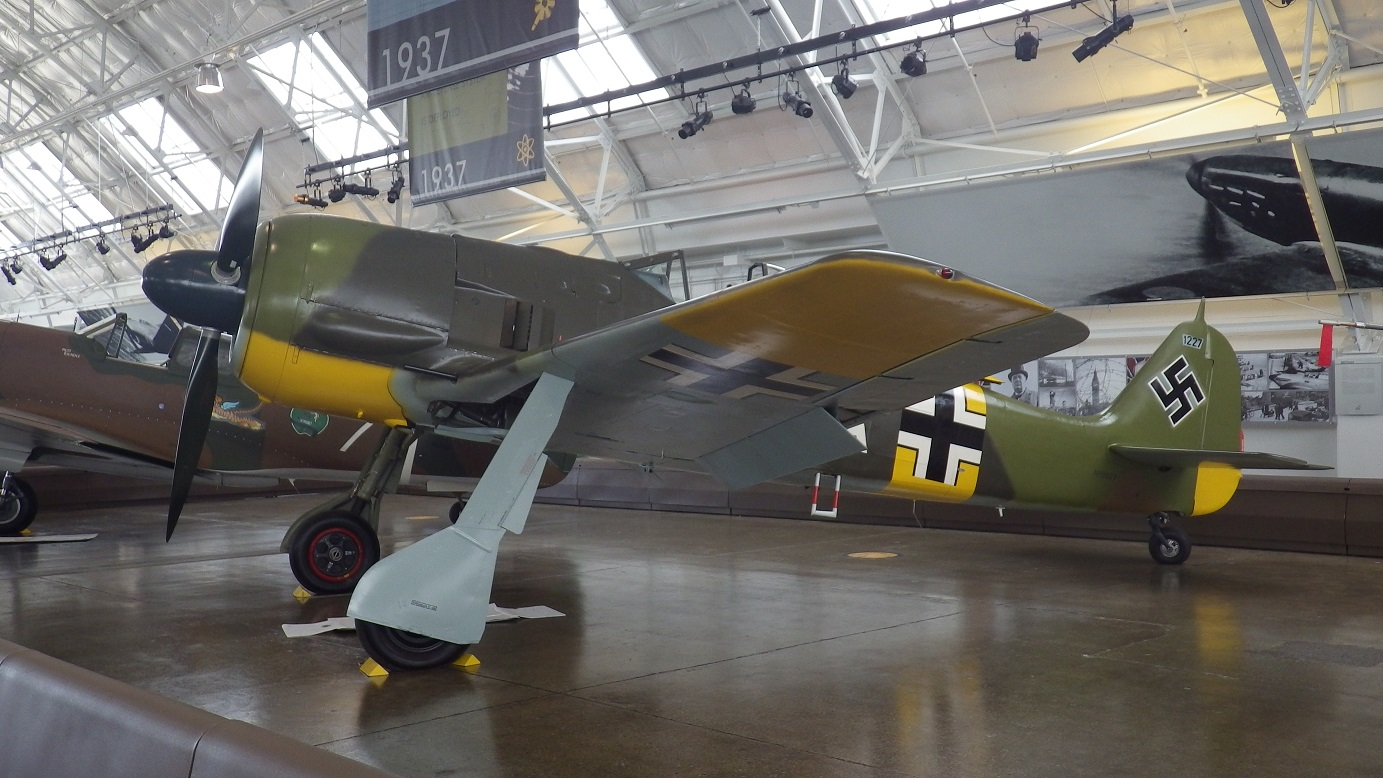
The Flying Heritage & Combat Armor Museum's airworthy Fw 190A-5, WkNr. 151 227, between flights with its original, restored BMW 801 radial.

A sizable number of BMW 801s exist in museums, some on display by themselves, with some 20 of them associated with surviving examples of the Focke-Wulf Fw 190s that they powered in World War II. The first original Fw 190 to be restored to flight condition in the 21st century is the Fw 190A-5 discovered near St. Petersburg, Russia in 1989, bearing Werknummer 151 227 and formerly serving with JG 54, was restored to flight condition along with its original BMW 801 powerplant. As of 2011, it is once again airworthy and located in Seattle, Washington, USA. The sole surviving Ju 388, in the hands of the Udvar-Hazy Center of the Smithsonian, has a pair of complete BMW 801J turbocharged engines still in its nacelles.

There is an 801-ML (801L) on display mounted in a Dornier 217 nacelle, essentially a complete surviving Motoranlage unitized powerplant, at the New England Air Museum, Bradley International Airport, Windsor Locks, CT. Likewise, the Ju 88R-1 night fighter at the Royal Air Force Museum London (see photo above) also has unitized BMW 801 radials installed.

== Description ==
The 801 was a radial engine with two rows of seven cylinders. The cylinders had both bore and stroke of 156 millimetres (6.1 in), giving a total capacity of 41.8 litres (2,550 cu in), just a bit less than the American Wright Cyclone 14 twin-row radial of some 1,600 to 1,900 hp output. The unit (including mounts) weighed from 1,010 to 1,250 kg and was about 1.29 m (51 in) across, depending on the model.

The BMW 801 was cooled by forced air with the cooling fan made from a magnesium alloy (probably Elektron), 10-bladed in the initial models, but 12-bladed in most engines. The fan rotated at 1.72 times the crankshaft speed (3.17 times the propeller speed). Air from the fan was blown into the center of the engine in front of the propeller gearing housing, and the shape of the housing and the engine itself carried the air to the outside of the cowling and across the cylinders. A set of slots or gills at the rear of the cowling allowed the hot air to escape. This provided effective cooling although at the cost of about 70 PS (69 hp, 51.5 kW) required to drive the fan when the aircraft was at low speed. Above 170 miles per hour (270 km/h), the fan absorbed little power directly as the vacuum effect of the airflow past the air exits provided the needed flow.

The 801 used a relatively complex system, integral to the BMW-designed, matching forward cowling system, to cool the lubricating oil. A ring-shaped oil cooler core was built into the BMW-provided forward cowl, just behind the fan. The outer portion of the oil cooler's core was in contact with the main cowling's sheetmetal, to possibly act as a heat sink. Comprising the BMW-designed forward cowl, in front of the oil cooler was a ring of metal with a C-shaped cross-section, with the outer lip lying just outside the rim of the cowl, and the inner side on the inside of the oil cooler core. Together, the metal ring and cowling formed an S-shaped airflow path, with the oil cooler's core contained between them. Airflow past the gap between the cowl and outer lip of the metal ring produced a vacuum effect that pulled air from the front of the engine outward and forward within the cowl's frontmost inner area just behind the fan, flowing forward across the oil cooler core in a separate airflow path from the rearwards-direction flow that cooled the engine's cylinders, just to provide cooling for the 801's oil. The rate of cooling airflow over the core could be controlled by moving the metal ring slightly forward or aft in order to open or close the gap.

The reasons for this complex system were threefold. One was to eliminate any extra aerodynamic drag that a protruding oil cooler would produce, in this case eliminating the extra drag factor by enclosing it within the engine's forward cowling. The second was to warm the air before it flowed to the oil cooler's circular-shaped core to aid warming the oil during starting. Finally, by placing the oil cooler behind the fan, cooling was provided even while the aircraft was parked. The downside to this design was that the oil cooler was in an extremely vulnerable location, and the metal ring was increasingly armoured as the war progressed.

=== Engine mounting formats ===
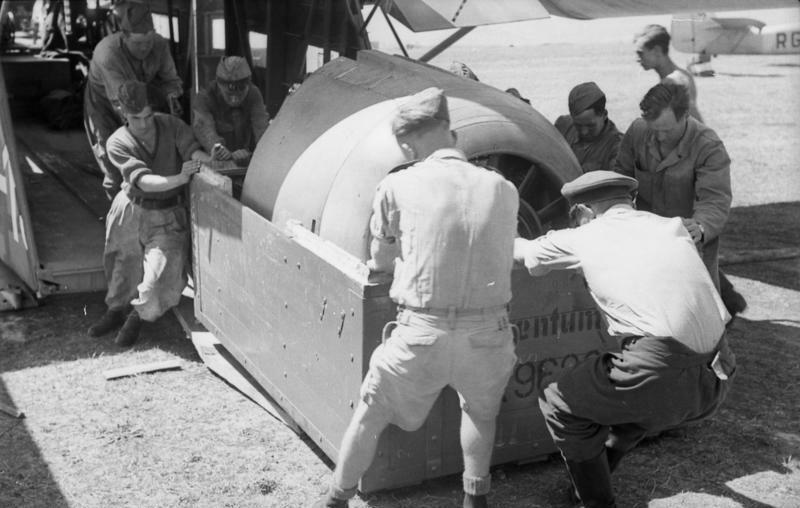
A complete BMW 801 engine unit, or Kraftei, being unloaded from a Gotha Go 242 transport glider. Russia, March 1943. Note the engine is already fitted with its cowling

The design of the BMW 801's cowling was key to its proper cooling, which BMW designed and built themselves and supplied with the engine. The design evolved throughout the war, including an extension to the engine mounts that allowed for larger cooling gills. This factory-supplied cowling also improved the simplicity of engine replacement in the field in more completely "unitizing" a BMW 801 radial engine, with as many of its auxiliary systems as possible being simultaneously replaceable with the engine itself, as opposed to opening or removing a "separate" cowling attached to the fuselage of the aircraft.

Engines were typically delivered from BMW complete in their cowling, ready to be bolted to the front of the aircraft or nacelle, since 1942 as Motoranlage (M) and 1944/1945 as Triebwerksanlage (T). The Motoranlage was the original form of the interchangeable Kraftei, or "power-egg", unitized powerplant installation concept used in many German wartime aircraft. It was most often used with twin and multi-engined designs, with some need for external add-ons. The more comprehensive Triebwerksanlage format for unitization consolidated more of the engine's required accessory systems beyond what the earlier Motoranlage concept could, plus some external mountings, such as an integrally complete exhaust system (including a turbocharger, if fitted as part of the design), as a completely interchangeable unit. Both M and T formats were also used with various inline engines, like the Daimler-Benz DB 603 used for both the inline-engined versions of the Do 217 and the enormous BV 238 flying boat, and the Junkers Jumo 213 powerplants used for later marks of the Ju 88 multirole aircraft.

The M and T unitized engine formats added secondary designator suffixes, which especially for the 801 radial (and perhaps others), did not always match the letter suffix that designated the bare radial engine used for a particular unitized installation, confusing the naming of the 801 engine series' subtypes considerably. These suffix designators initially referred to these complete kits and their "bare" engine counterparts almost interchangeably. The A, B and L models were known (logically) as Motoranlage style MA, MB and ML engines in this form, but the common D-2 was instead known as the MG. As the war wore on the confusion increased, the E model was delivered as the Triebwerksanlage style TG or TH, seemingly suggesting a relation to the G and H engines, but in fact those were delivered as the TL and TP. It is rather common to see the turbocharged versions referred to only with the T for the more completely unitized Triebwerksanlage installations, notably the (most notoriously of all) TJ for the BMW 801J turbocharged radial subtype, and the TQ models, further confusing the issue.

== Similar designs: BMW 804 and BMW 805 ==
Despite producing a successful engine, as the BMW 801, the company's designers designed similar, although more powerful and improved engines. Two of these were the BMW 804 and the BMW 805.

The BMW 804 was similar to the BMW 801, but it had increased stroke and bore, which increased the displacement from 41.8 liters to 45.5 liters. The takeoff-rating would have been 2000 PS with a single-stage supercharger.

The BMW 805 was also similar to the BMW 801, but with a two-stage, four-speed supercharger. The 805 would also had increased revolutions (2900/min) and other improvements, like a new cranckcase (for the increased revs) and bigger valves. The takeoff-rating would have been 2400 PS with a 12000 meters critical altitude.

None of these two engines reached production status.

== Variants ==
Data from Gersdorff and Bingham

BMW 801 A, C, L (B)
1,560 PS (1,539 hp, 1,147 kW), original, 87 octane fuel series. 801C/L had automatic propeller pitch system. Compression ratio: 6.5. Supercharger Gear Ratios: 5.04 and 7.46.
BMW 801 D-2, Q-2, G-2, (H-2)
1,700 PS (1,677 hp, 1,250 kW), first 100 octane fuel series. Increased boost, gear- and compression ratios. The Q-2 had bi-fuel system and provision for nitrous-oxide injection as well as an enlarged oil cooler with thicker armor . Compression ratio: 7.2. Supercharger Gear Ratios: 5.31 and 8.31
BMW 801 E, S, R
2,000 PS (1,973 hp, 1,471 kW) takeoff-rating, improved series. The E could deliver 2,300 PS in 5-minute overboost, the S could deliver 2,200 PS in special-emergency. 801R bi-fuel with two-stage supercharging. The dry weight of the 801R was 1796 kilogramms. E and S with same gear ratios with first gear ratio increased from 5.31 to 6. The S used parts from E and F versions and the supercharger of the E. The S had improved and simplified master controller and was produced from 1944.
BMW 801 F
2,400 PS (2,367 hp, 1,765 kW), 2,600 PS on test bench in 1945. Higher critical-altitude, strengthened components, fuel injector pump with larger capacity, improved aerodynamics and new supercharger intake. Development halted by the end of the war
BMW 801 J
1,810 PS (1,785 hp, 1331 kW), turbocharged production version. A D-2 engine with additional Turbocharging. The turbocharger's blades were air-cooled. Dry weight: 1607 kilogramms. Length: 2555 mm.

== Applications ==
- Blohm & Voss BV 141
- Blohm & Voss BV 144
- Dornier Do 217
- Focke-Wulf Fw 190
- Focke-Wulf Fw 191
- Heinkel He 277 (as designed for Amerikabomber role)
- Junkers Ju 88
- Junkers Ju 188
- Junkers Ju 288 (as temporary fitment, in place of intended Jumo 222 engines)
- Junkers Ju 388
- Junkers Ju 290
- Junkers Ju 390
- Messerschmitt Me 264 (replacing original Jumo 211 fitment)

== Specifications (BMW 801 C) ==
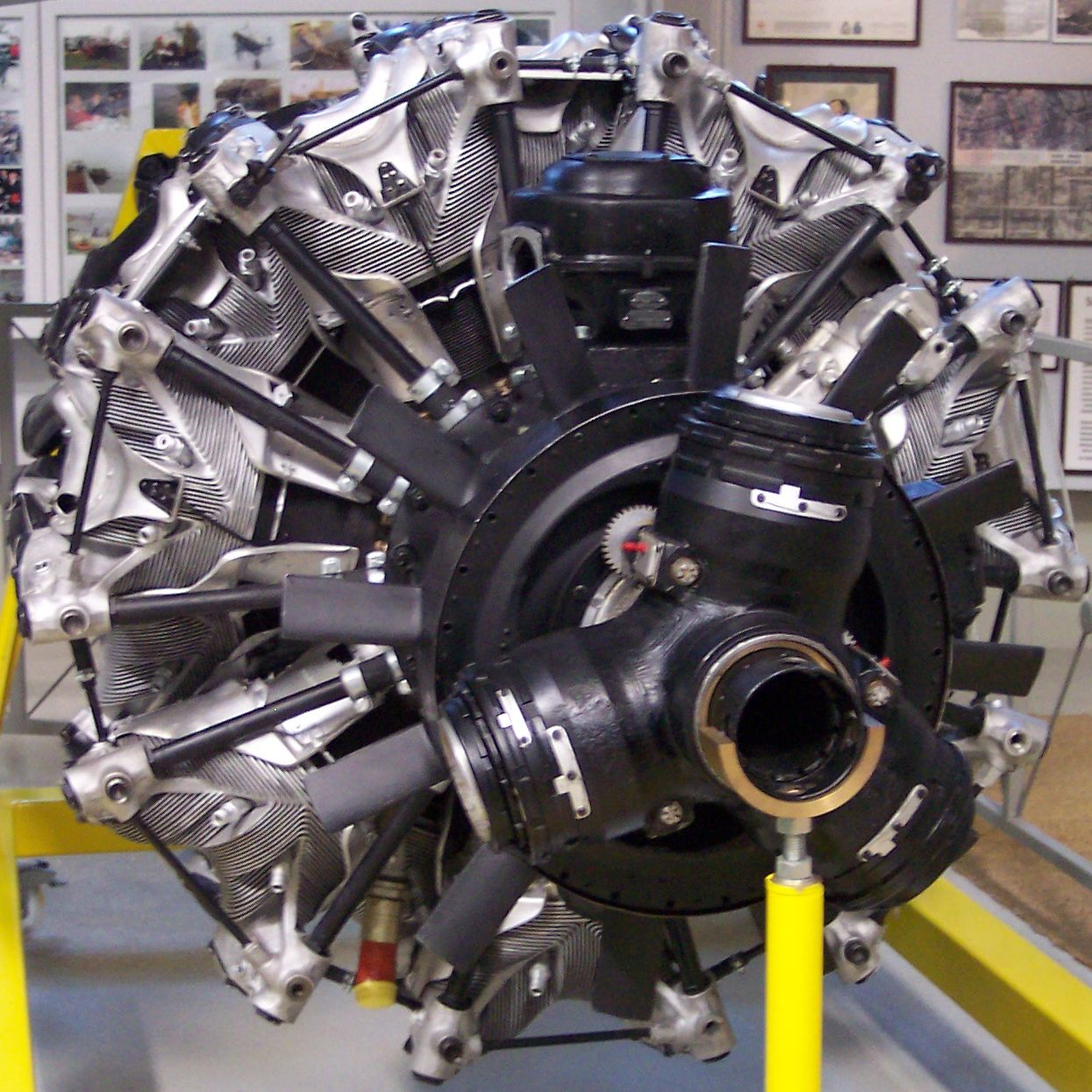
BMW 801 front view. Note the cooling fan (black). The three cylinders at the front are the propeller hub, not part of the engine itself.

Data from

=== General characteristics ===
- Type: 14-cylinder supercharged two-row air-cooled radial engine
- Bore: 156 mm (6.15 in)
- Stroke: 156 mm (6.15 in)
- Displacement: 41.8 litres (2,560 in³)
- Length: 2,006 mm (79 in)
- Diameter: 1,290 mm (51 in)
- Dry weight: 1,012 kg (2,231 lb)

=== Components ===
- Valvetrain: One intake and one sodium-cooled exhaust valve per cylinder
- Supercharger: Gear-driven single-stage two-speed
- Fuel system: Direct fuel injection
- Cooling system: Air-cooled, with oil cooler integrated into forward cowl

=== Performance ===
- Power output: 1,560 PS (1,539 hp, 1,147 kW) at 2,700 rpm for takeoff at sea level
- Specific power: 27.44 kW/L (0.60 hp/in³)
- Compression ratio: 6.5:1
- Specific fuel consumption: 0.308 kg/(kW·h) (0.506 lb/(hp·h))
- Power-to-weight ratio: 1.13 kW/kg (0.69 hp/lb)

== See also ==
Related development

- BMW 802
- BMW 803

Comparable engines

- Bristol Hercules
- Fiat A.74
- Gnome-Rhône 14N
- Mitsubishi Kasei
- Mitsubishi Kinsei
- Nakajima Sakae
- Pratt & Whitney R-2800
- Shvetsov ASh-82
- Wright R-2600

Related lists

- List of aircraft engines

== Bibliography ==
- Bingham, Victor (1998). Major Piston Aero Engines of World War II. Shrewsbury, UK: Airlife Publishing. ISBN 1-84037-012-2.
- Christopher, John (2013). The Race for Hitler's X-Planes: Britain's 1945 Mission to Capture Secret Luftwaffe Technology. Stroud, UK: History Press. ISBN 978-0-7524-6457-2.
- Gersdorff, Kyrill von, Kurt Grasmann, Helmut Schubert: Flugmotoren und Strahltriebwerke. Bernard & Graefe Verlag, 1995, ISBN 3-7637-6107-1.
- Gunston, Bill (2006). World Encyclopedia of Aero Engines: From the Pioneers to the Present Day (5th ed.). Stroud, UK: Sutton. ISBN 0-7509-4479-X.
- Sheffield, F (13 August 1942). "THE B.M.W. 801A" (pdf). Flight.
