= Akaflieg Berlin B3 Charlotte II =

German single-seat tailless glider, 1923

B3 Charlotte II
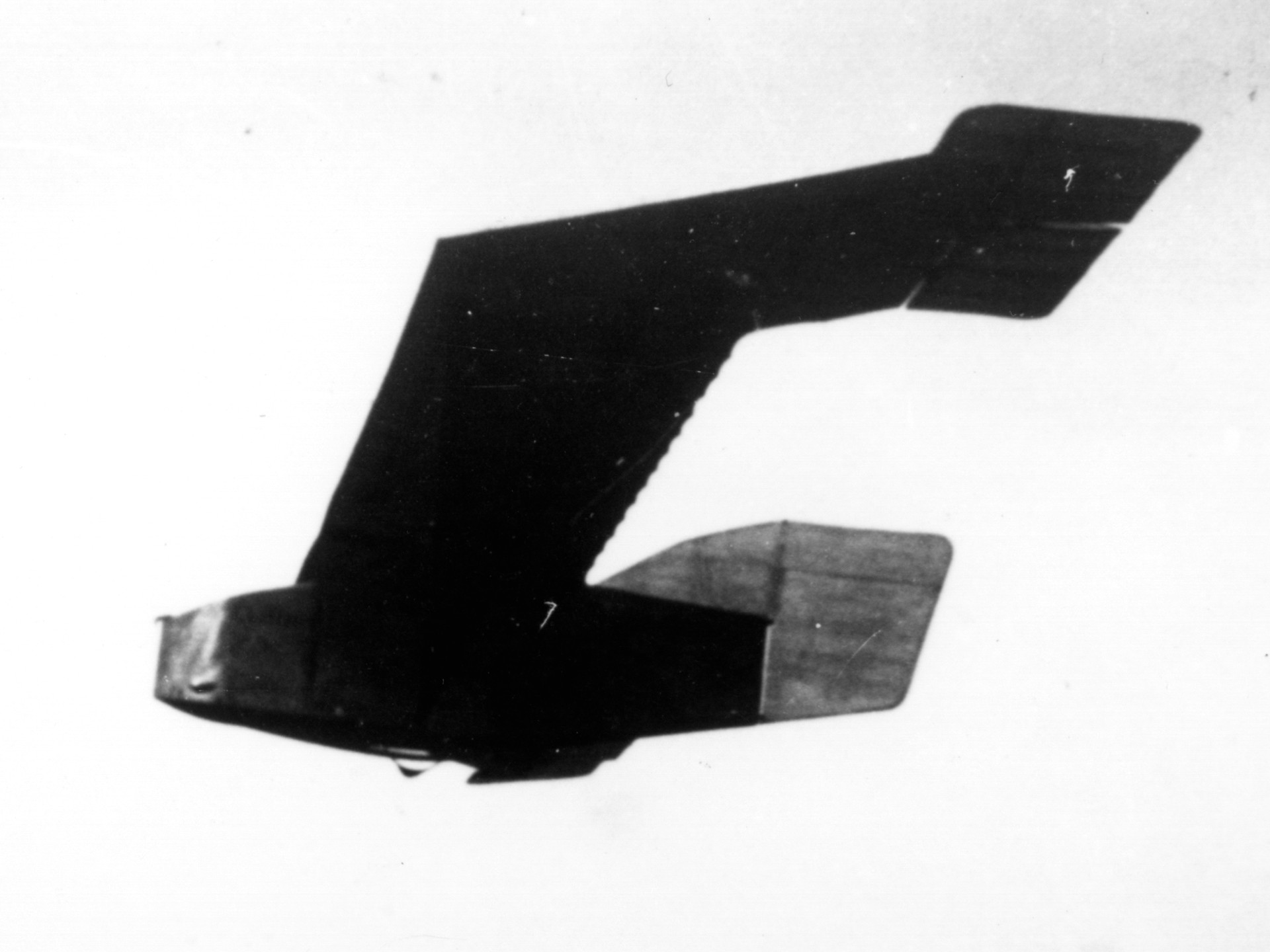

General information
- Type: Sailplane
- National origin: Germany
- Manufacturer: Akaflieg Berlin
- Number built: 1

History
- First flight: 1923

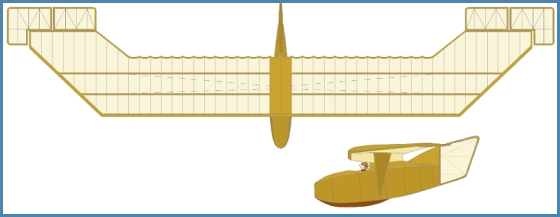
2-view profile

The Akaflieg Berlin B3 Charlotte II was a glider built in Germany in the 1920s. It featured a high-wing, tailless sailplane configuration of all-wood construction, which had a single skid for landing and applied brakes.

== Specifications ==
Data from 75 Jahre 10 NI AKAFLIEG BERLIN 1920 - 1995

General characteristics

- Length: 4.1 m (13 ft 5 in)
- Wingspan: 14.2 m (46 ft 7 in)
- Height: 1.5 m (4 ft 11 in)
- Wing area: 19.5 m^{2} (210 sq ft)
- Aspect ratio: 10.3
- Empty weight: 133 kg (293 lb)
- Gross weight: 195 kg (430 lb)

Performance

- Wing loading: 10 kg/m^{2} (2.0 lb/sq ft)
