= Akaflieg Berlin B5 =

German single-seat glider, 1937

B5

General information
- Type: Sailplane
- National origin: Germany
- Manufacturer: Akaflieg Berlin
- Number built: 1

History
- First flight: 1937

The Akaflieg Berlin B5 was a glider built in Germany in the late 1930s. It featured a high-wing, cantilever sailplane configuration of all-wood construction, with cantilevered gull-wings, retractable landing-gear, all-moving-tail, dive air-brakes.

== Specifications (B5) ==
Data from , Flugzeug-Typenbuch. Handbuch der deutschen Luftfahrt- und Zubehör-Industrie 1944

General characteristics

- Crew: 1
- Length: 6.15 m (20 ft 2 in)
- Wingspan: 15 m (49 ft 3 in)
- Height: 1.24 m (4 ft 1 in)
- Wing area: 11 m^{2} (120 sq ft)
- Length de-rigged: 7.28 m (24 ft)
- Width de-rigged (without tailplane): 1 m (3 ft 3 in)
- Width de-rigged (with tailplane): 2.5 m (8 ft 2 in)
- Height de-rigged: 1.24 m (4 ft 1 in)
- Aspect ratio: 20.45
- Airfoil: root Göttingen 549; mid span Göttingen 497; tip Göttingen 497
- Empty weight: 140 kg (309 lb)
- Gross weight: 225 kg (496 lb)

Performance

- Never exceed speed: 228 km/h (142 mph, 123 kn)
- Aerotow speed: 120 km/h (75 mph; 65 kn)
- g limits: +8 (ultimate)
- Maximum glide ratio: 30.5:1 at 76 km/h (47 mph; 41 kn)
- Rate of sink: 0.67 m/s (132 ft/min) at 64 km/h (40 mph; 35 kn)
- Wing loading: 20.45 kg/m^{2} (4.19 lb/sq ft)

== See also ==
- List of gliders
