= Akaflieg Berlin B2 Teufelchen =

German single-seat glider, 1922

B2 Teufelchen
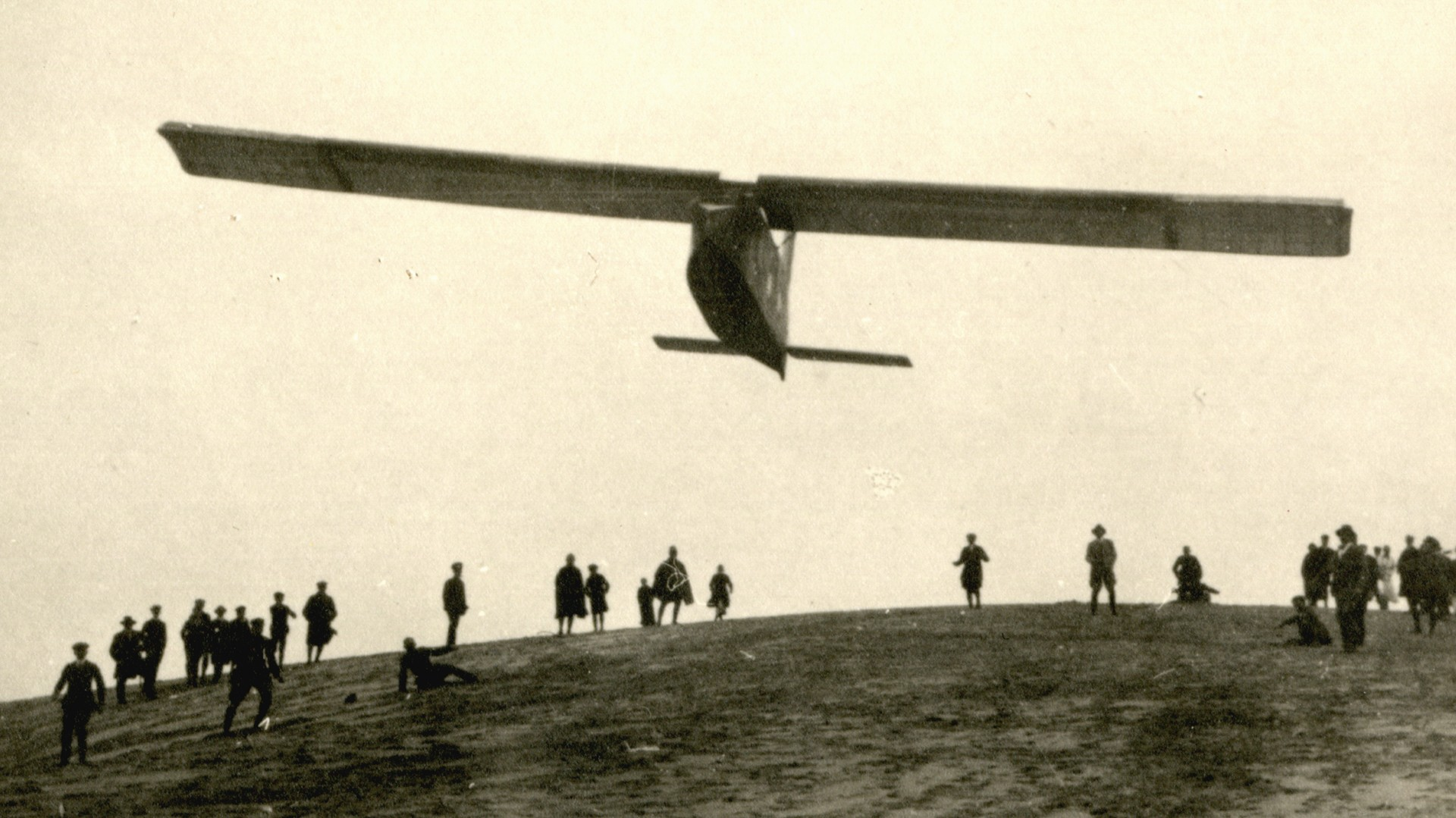
- Teufelchen at the 1923 Rossiten coastal gliding competition

General information
- Type: Glider
- National origin: Germany
- Designer: Kurt Tank
- Number built: 1

History
- First flight: 1922

The Akaflieg Berlin B2 Teufelchen was a glider built in Germany in the 1920s. It featured a high-wing, cantilever sailplane configuration of all-wood construction.

== Design and development ==
Kurt Tank studied electrical engineering, but he also tried his hand at a home-built glider, nicknamed Teufelchen (en:Little devil). Anxious to compete at the Rossitten coastal gliding competition in 1923 Tank had the LFG-Stralsund works complete the glider in time for the competition; transporting the aircraft by horse-drawn cart.

The 'B2' was characterized by warping wing-tips, in the hope of dispensing with ailerons. Construction was mixed with wooden structure covered with aluminium sheeting, which earned the Teufelchen a prize for best construction.

After Tank crashed the B2 it was returned to Berlin and repaired at the Sablatnig works where it had been built. The B2 next attended the 4th Rhön meeting in August 1923, where Tank had a hard landing. The 2nd Rossitten coastal meeting saw many of the competitors flying over the dunes and sea, including the B2, which Möller was forced to land in and the B2 sank.

== Specifications (B2) ==
Data from 75 Jahre AKAFLIEG BERLIN 1920–1995

General characteristics

- Length: 5 m (16 ft 5 in)
- Wingspan: 11.5 m (37 ft 9 in)
- Wing area: 13.7 m^{2} (147 sq ft)
- Empty weight: 106 kg (234 lb)
- Gross weight: 176 kg (388 lb)

Performance

- Maximum glide ratio: 9.6
- Wing loading: 12.8 kg/m^{2} (2.6 lb/sq ft)

== See also ==
- List of gliders
