= Akaflieg Berlin B1 =

German single-seat tailless glider, 1922

B1 Charlotte
- Charlotte at the Rhön competition in 1922

General information
- Type: Sailplane
- National origin: Germany
- Manufacturer: Akaflieg Berlin
- Number built: 1

History
- First flight: 1922

The Akaflieg Berlin B1 Charlotte (named after the university at Charlottenburg), was a glider built in Germany in the 1920s. It featured a high-wing, tailless sailplane configuration of all-wood construction, which had a pair of skids for landing.

== Design and development ==
Hermann Winter and Edmund Pfister shared the design work for the "Charlotte", hoping to compete at the 2nd Rhön competition at the Wasserkuppe. Progress was slow as Pfister had a full-time job to fulfill. Professor Winter was determined to compete at the next Rhön meeting, so he engaged the Sablatnig Works for completion of the glider, which went on to win at the Wasserkuppe in August 1922.

== Specifications (B 1) ==
Data from 75 Jahre 10 NI AKAFLIEG BERLIN 1920 - 1995

General characteristics

- Crew: 1
- Length: 4.5 m (14 ft 9 in)
- Wingspan: 15.2 m (49 ft 10 in)
- Wing area: 20 m^{2} (220 sq ft)
- Aspect ratio: 11.1
- Empty weight: 100 kg (220 lb)
- Gross weight: 170 kg (375 lb)

Performance

- Wing loading: 8.5 kg/m^{2} (1.7 lb/sq ft)

== See also ==
- List of gliders
