= Akaflieg Berlin B13 =

Two-seat German motor-glider, 1991

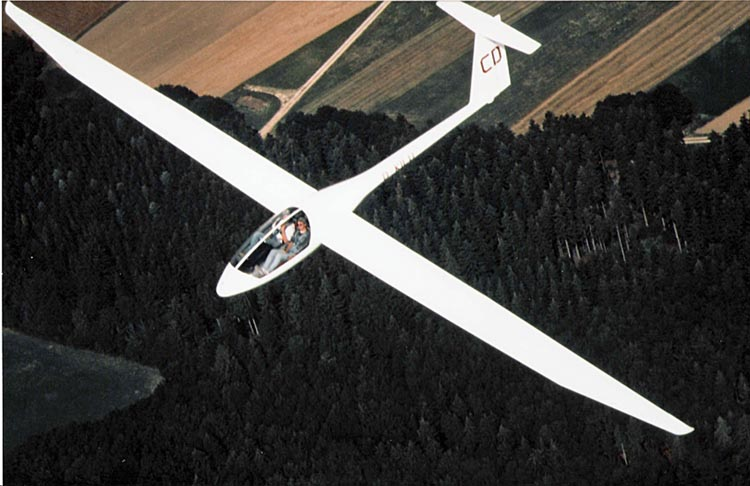

General information
- Type: High Performance Two-Seat Glider (with sustainer)
- National origin: Germany
- Manufacturer: Akaflieg Berlin
- Primary user: Akaflieg Berlin
- Number built: 1

History
- First flight: 1991

The Akaflieg Berlin B13 is a two-seat motor-glider designed and built in Germany.

== Development ==
Students at Akaflieg Berlin studied a high-performance motor-glider with the engine in the nose and an automatically folding propeller. After approval was given, a prototype was built in 1991, as the ' Akaflieg Berlin B13', using GFRP (glass-fibre re-inforced plastic) to form a fuselage with smooth lines, housing the engine in the nose and a two-seat side-by-side cockpit covered by a large plexiglas canopy.

Intended to use a sustainer motor, for sustaining flight only, power was to be supplied by a modified 24.5KW (33 hp) engine in the extreme nose driving a 5-blade folding retractable propeller, specially developed by Prof. Oehler. However, problems with the integration of the engine with the fuselage have prevented the fitting of the engine, resulting in the 'B13' being restricted to un-powered flight only.

== Specifications (B13 power off) ==
Data from Jane's All the World's Aircraft 1988-89, sailplanedirectory.com

General characteristics

- Crew: 2
- Length: 8.3 m (27 ft 3 in)
- Wingspan: 23.2 m (76 ft 1 in)
- Height: 1.9 m (6 ft 3 in)
- Wing area: 18.9 m^{2} (203 sq ft)
- Aspect ratio: 28.5
- Airfoil: HQ 41/ 14,35
- Empty weight: 590 kg (1,301 lb)
- Max takeoff weight: 850 kg (1,874 lb)
- Fuel capacity: 25 L (6.6 US gal; 5.5 imp gal)
- Water Ballast: 160 L (42 US gal; 35 imp gal)
- Powerplant: 1 × Rotax 377 2-cyl. horizontally-opposed air-cooled piston engine, 24 kW (32 hp)
- Propellers: 5-bladed Oehler folding propeller

Performance

- Stall speed: 70 km/h (43 mph, 38 kn)
- Never exceed speed: 280 km/h (170 mph, 150 kn) in smooth air
  200 km/h (110 kn; 120 mph) in rough air
  75 km/h (40 kn; 47 mph) on aero-tow
  120 km/h (65 kn; 75 mph) on winch launch
- g limits: +5.3 - 2.65
- Maximum glide ratio: 49 at 105 km/h (57 kn; 65 mph)
- Rate of sink: 0.55 m/s (108 ft/min) at 75 km/h (40 kn; 47 mph)
- Wing loading: 42.2 kg/m^{2} (8.6 lb/sq ft) at max t/o weight
- Power/mass: 0.0376 kW/kg (0.0229 hp/lb)

== See also ==
Aircraft of comparable role, configuration, and era

- Stemme S-10
- Caproni Vizzola Calif
