= Akaflieg Berlin B6 =

German single-seat glider, 1938

B6

General information
- Type: Sailplane
- National origin: Germany
- Manufacturer: Akaflieg Berlin
- Number built: 1

History
- First flight: 1938

The Akaflieg Berlin B6 was a glider built in Germany in the late 1930s. It featured a high-wing, cantilevered mid-wing sailplane configuration with Junkers-flaps, retractable landing gear, all moving tail, dive air brakes, wood and steel body.

== Specifications (B6) ==
Data from 75 Jahre 10 NI AKAFLIEG BERLIN 1920 - 1995, Flugzeug-Typenbuch. Handbuch der deutschen Luftfahrt- und Zubehör-Industrie 1944

General characteristics

- Crew: 1
- Length: 6.2 m (20 ft 4 in)
- Wingspan: 16 m (52 ft 6 in)
- Height: 1.25 m (4 ft 1 in)
- Wing area: 14.6 m^{2} (157 sq ft)
- Length de-rigged: 7.7 m (25 ft)
- Width de-rigged (without tailplane): 1 m (3 ft 3 in)
- Width de-rigged (with tailplane): 2.8 m (9 ft 2 in)
- Height de-rigged: 1.25 m (4 ft 1 in)
- Aspect ratio: 17.53
- Airfoil: NACA 43012
- Empty weight: 155 kg (342 lb)
- Gross weight: 240 kg (529 lb)

Performance

- Never exceed speed: 225 km/h (140 mph, 121 kn)
- Maximum glide ratio: 30:1 at 68 km/h (42 mph; 37 kn)
- Rate of sink: 0.58 m/s (114 ft/min) at 54 km/h (34 mph; 29 kn)
- Wing loading: 16.42 kg/m^{2} (3.36 lb/sq ft)

== See also ==
- List of gliders
