= Akaflieg Berlin B8 =

German single-seat glider, 1939

- B8 V2

General information
- Type: Sailplane
- National origin: Germany
- Manufacturer: Akaflieg Berlin
- Number built: 2

History
- First flight: 1939

The Akaflieg Berlin B8 was a German sailplane built in the late 1930s for the 1939 Olympic games glider competition in Rome. It was a high-wing sailplane with a cantilever shoulder-wing, dive air-brakes and all wood construction.

== Specifications (variant specified) ==
Data from , Flugzeug-Typenbuch. Handbuch der deutschen Luftfahrt- und Zubehör-Industrie 1944

General characteristics

- Crew: 1
- Length: 7.1 m (23 ft 4 in)
- Wingspan: 15 m (49 ft 3 in)
- Height: 1.5 m (4 ft 11 in)
- Wing area: 15.6 m^{2} (168 sq ft)
- Length de-rigged: 7.1 m (23 ft)
- Width de-rigged (without tailplane): 0.65 m (2 ft 2 in)
- Width de-rigged (with tailplane): 3 m (10 ft)
- Height de-rigged: 1.5 m (4 ft 11 in)
- Aspect ratio: 14.41
- Airfoil: root:Göttingen 549; mid-span: Göttingen 535; tip: Göttingen 535; tail unit: NACA 0012
- Empty weight: 165 kg (364 lb)
- Gross weight: 260 kg (573 lb)

Performance

- Maximum glide ratio: 23:1 at 68 km/h (42 mph; 37 kn)
- Rate of sink: 0.7 m/s (140 ft/min) at 56 km/h (35 mph; 30 kn)
- Wing loading: 16.65 kg/m^{2} (3.41 lb/sq ft)

== See also ==
- List of gliders
