= Nakajima Homare =

1940s Japanese piston aircraft engine

Homare
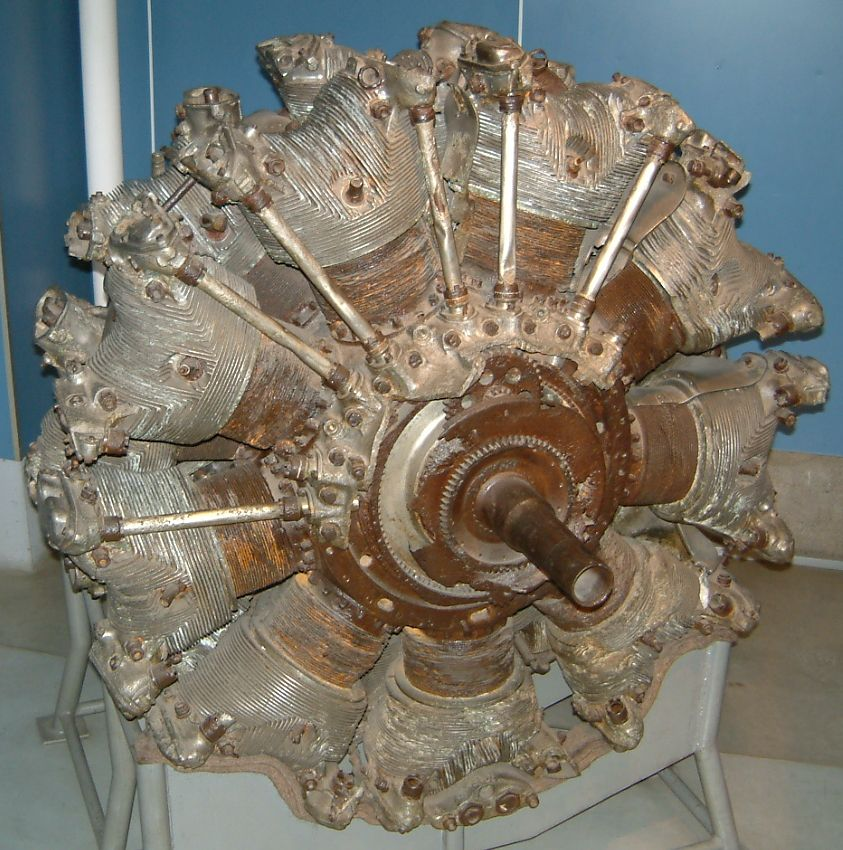
- Nakajima Homare engine
- Type: Piston aircraft engine
- Manufacturer: Nakajima Aircraft Company
- Designer: Ryoichi Nakagawa
- First run: 1941
- Major applications: Nakajima Ki-84, Kawanishi N1K-J, Yokosuka P1Y, Nakajima C6N
- Number built: 9,089
- Developed from: Sakae

The Nakajima Homare (誉, "praise" or, more usually, "honour") was an air-cooled twin-row 18-cylinder radial Japanese aircraft engine manufactured during World War II. Producing almost 2,000 horsepower, it was used widely by both the Imperial Japanese Army and the Imperial Japanese Navy. Given the Navy service designation NK9, the "Homare" was also given the company designation NBA, Army experimental designation Ha-45 (ハ45) or, Army long designation Nakajima Army Type 4 1,900 hp Air-Cooled Radial and, (coincidentally) unified designation code of Ha-45.

== Design and development ==
Development of the Homare started in 1940, and certification was completed in 1941. It succeeded Nakajima's previous 14-cylinder Sakae (Ha-25) engine, which had its own forward seven cylinders staggered from the rear seven for efficient cooling.

The design was exceptionally compact, with an external diameter of 118 cm, a mere 3 cm larger than the Sakae. With a bore and stroke of 130 mm x 150 mm, it was classified as a short-stroke engine. It was designed to output around 1800 hp (1340 kW), or 100 hp (75 kW) per cylinder. However, the tight design of the engine made it difficult to maintain quality in manufacturing, and unreliability in the field was a significant problem; actual output of early models at altitude was in the range of 1300 hp (970 kW), far below the designed capability. Later models had improved performance, and it became one of the predominant powerplants of Japanese military aircraft in the latter part of the war. A total of 9089 were produced.

== Variants ==
- Homare 11 - 1,650 hp (1,230 kW), 1,820 hp (1,357 kW), 1,900 hp (1,417 kW)
- Homare 12 - 1,825 hp (1,361 kW)
- Homare 21 - 1,990 hp (1,460 kW)
- Homare 23 - 2,000 hp (1,491 kW)
- Homare 25 - 2,000 hp (1,491 kW)
- Homare 42 - 2,200 hp (1,640 kW)

== Applications ==
- Aichi B7A2
- Kawanishi N1K-J
- Mitsubishi A7M1
- Nakajima C6N1
- Nakajima G8N1
- Nakajima J5N1
- Nakajima Ki-84
- Yokosuka D4Y5
- Yokosuka P1Y1

== Specifications (Ha-45-21) ==
Data from Technical Air Intelligence Center (TAIC) Manual

=== General characteristics ===
- Type: 18-cylinder air-cooled twin-row radial engine
- Bore: 130 mm (5.12 in)
- Stroke: 150 mm (5.91 in)
- Displacement: 35.8 L (2187 in^{3})
- Length: 1,778 mm (70 in)
- Diameter: 1,180 mm (46.5 in)
- Dry weight: 810 kg (1,785 lb)

=== Components ===
- Valvetrain: push rod operated overhead-valve system with 2 valves per cylinder
- Supercharger: Two-speed single stage centrifugal
- Fuel system: 2 BBL. D.D. Float Carb.
- Fuel type: 92 Octane + ADI
- Cooling system: Air-cooled

=== Performance ===
- Power output: 1,485 kW (1,990 hp) at altitude
- Specific power: 38,57 kW/L (0.91 hp/in^{3})
- Compression ratio: 8.0
- Power-to-weight ratio: 1.83 kW/kg (1,11 hp/lb)

== See also ==
Comparable engines

- BMW 802
- Bristol Centaurus
- Pratt & Whitney R-2800
- Wright R-3350
- Shvetsov ASh-73
- Nakajima Sakae
- Hitachi Ha-51

Related lists

- List of aircraft engines
