= BMW 802 =

Aircraft engine

- Type: Radial engine
- Manufacturer: BMW
- First run: 1943

The BMW 802 was a large air-cooled radial aircraft engine, built using two rows of nine cylinders to produce what was essentially an 18-cylinder version of the 14-cylinder BMW 801. Although promising at first, development dragged on and the project was eventually cancelled to concentrate on jet engines instead.

== Design and development ==
Soon after the 801 entered testing, BMW engineers turned to building much larger versions.

=== BMW 803 ===
One idea was to bolt two 801s back to back. Although seemingly a simple concept, the resulting, 83.5 litre displacement BMW 803 was fantastically complicated. The power of the engine could only practically be used in extremely large propellers, or, as selected, a contra-rotating pair of propellers. This required a large gearbox on the front of the engine, which combined with the layout of the cylinders, left no room for airflow over the cylinders. This demanded the addition of liquid cooling.

=== BMW 802 ===
Another idea was to add more cylinders to the 801 design, and since radials need to have an odd number of cylinders per row, the next size up was a two-row 9-cylinder design. The 802 emerged with an almost identical displacement to the American 18-cylinder Wright R-3350 Duplex-Cyclone and just 54 cm^{3} (3.3 cu in) larger than the British Bristol Centaurus.

One problem with the 801 was its poor altitude performance, due almost entirely to its single-stage two-speed, mechanically driven supercharger. Since the 802 was not a necessity given the success and emerging flexibility of the 801's basic design, the engineers decided to take the time needed to address this problem by including an improved two-stage, three-speed supercharger. The lowest-speed setting would not "rob" as much power at low altitudes, allowing the engine to produce 2,600 PS (1,912 kW) for takeoff, and still produce 1,600 PS (1,176 kW) at 12,000 m (39,000 ft). This was a dramatic improvement on the 801A's 1,600 PS (1,176 kW) for takeoff and 1,380 PS (1,015 kW) maximum at 4,500 m (14,800 ft), especially notable considering the engine was less than 30% larger in displacement.

In addition, airflow through the engine had been carefully managed by the BMW aviation powerplant engineering team to enable the straightest possible path into and out of the engine. A twelve-blade fan, almost identical in appearance to the 801's, and stator compressed incoming air, then fed some into the supercharger. The rest was channeled into three paths, the intercooler and the front and rear cylinder baffles. All three streams rejoined behind the rearmost row of cylinders into the exhaust. The combination of the fan and ejector thrust from the exhaust balanced the total internal engine drag.

Looking at competing German engines in the 2,000 hp 'class', the engine weighed 1,530 kg (3,370 lb), the same weight as the complex DB 606, which consisted of twinned water-cooled V12 Daimler-Benz DB 601s coupled together, which generated some 2,700 PS (1,986 kW) at sea level for takeoff. The American Wright Duplex-Cyclone radial engine, however, only weighed 1,212 kg (2,670 lb) for nearly the same displacement and engine configuration as the 802. The 802 was eventually projected to be capable of producing 3,000 hp (2,200 kW; 3,000 PS), a power level that the Duplex-Cyclone would not equal and surpass until the post-war years, up to some 2,610 kW (3,500 hp) through the addition of a trio of power-recovery turbines in later models.

=== P.8011 ===
A further improvement led to P.8011, which replaced the supercharger with two smaller turbochargers, driving contra-rotating propellers. This raised the takeoff power to about 2,800 PS (2,059 kW), (some report 2,900 PS (2,133 kW)) and dramatically improved altitude performance. As with most German turbocharger projects, the lack of quality high-temperature alloys meant the project was never able to enter production.

=== Cancellation ===
Development was still underway in late 1943 when BMW decided the project wasn't worthwhile. With their BMW 003 axial-flow turbojet engine finally maturing and considerably larger models of turbojet and even turboprop powerplants entering the prototype phase from both BMW and their competitors, it appeared that large piston engines weren't worth building. Postwar, the British scientific mission's leader, Sir Roy Fedden, called it "interesting and innovative" and considered it "one of the most interesting piston engines seen in Germany".

== Specifications (BMW 802) ==
=== General characteristics ===
- Type: 18-cylinder supercharged two-row radial engine
- Bore: 156 mm (6.142 in)
- Stroke: 156 mm (6.142 in)
- Displacement: 53.671 L (3,275.2 in^{3})
- Dry weight: 1,530 kg (3,380 lb)

=== Components ===
- Valvetrain: One intake and one sodium-cooled exhaust valve per cylinder
- Supercharger: Gear-driven single-stage three-speed
- Fuel system: Fuel injection
- Cooling system: Air-cooled

=== Performance ===
- Power output:
- 1,912 kW (2,563 hp) for takeoff
- 1,176 kW (1,575 hp) at 12,000 m (39,000 ft)
- Specific power: 35.6 kW/L (0.78 hp/in^{3})
- Compression ratio: 6.5:1
- Power-to-weight ratio: 1.25 kW/kg (0.76 hp/lb)

== See also ==
Related development

- BMW 801
- BMW 803

Comparable engines

- Bristol Centaurus
- Hitachi Ha-51
- Nakajima Homare
- Pratt & Whitney R-2800 Double Wasp
- Shvetsov ASh-73
- Wright R-3350 Duplex-Cyclone

Related lists

- List of aircraft engines

== Bibliography ==
- Bingham, Victor (1998). Major Piston Aero Engines of World War II. Shrewsbury, UK: Airlife Publishing. ISBN 1-84037-012-2.
- Christopher, John (2013). The Race for Hitler's X-Planes: Britain's 1945 Mission to Capture Secret Luftwaffe Technology. Stroud, UK: History Press. ISBN 978-0-7524-6457-2.
- Gunston, Bill (2006). World Encyclopedia of Aero Engines: From the Pioneers to the Present Day (5th ed.). Stroud, UK: Sutton. ISBN 0-7509-4479-X.
