= Beechcraft XA-38 Grizzly =

1944 prototype attack aircraft by Beechcraft

XA-38 Grizzly
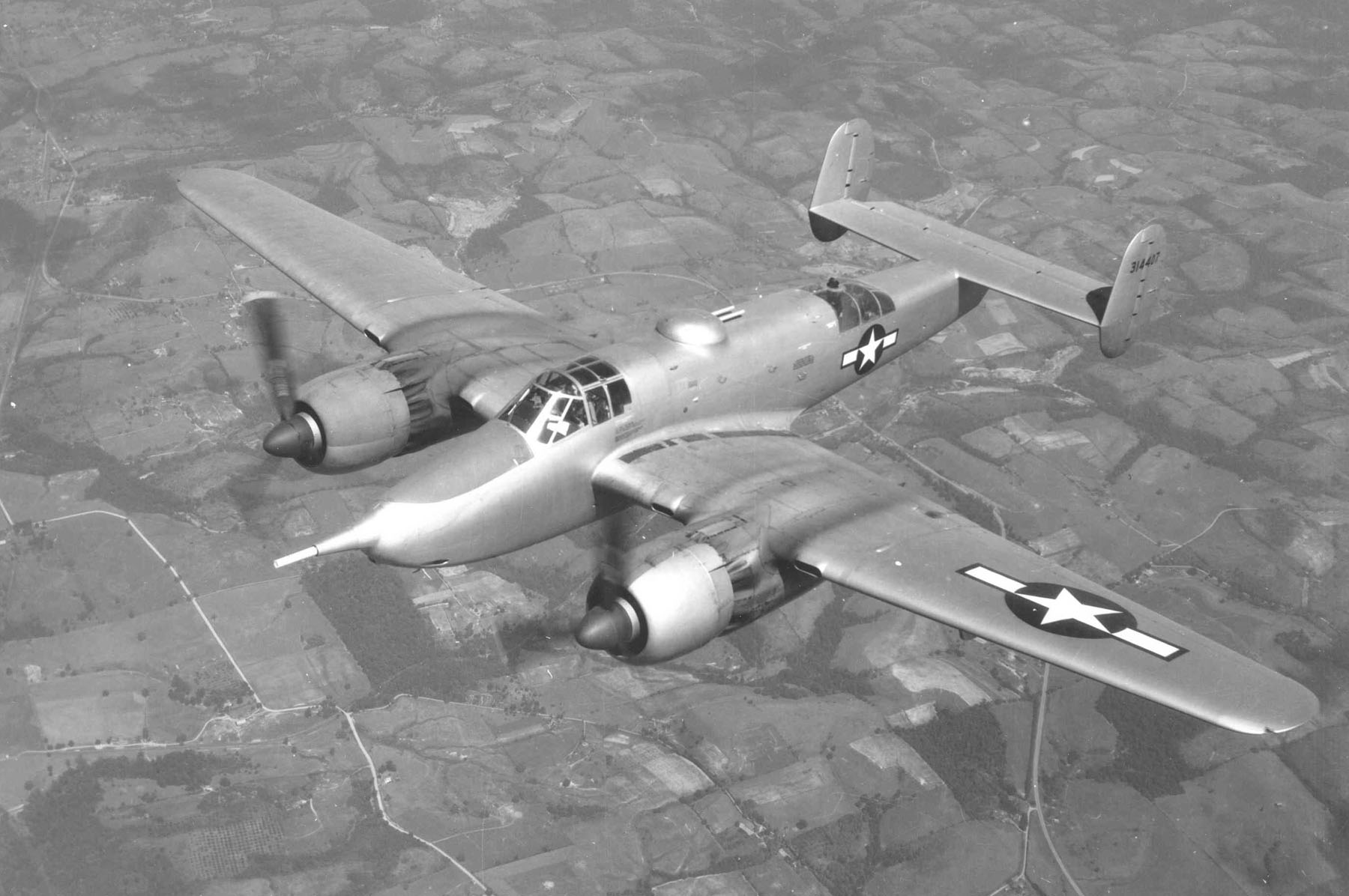

General information
- Type: Attack aircraft
- National origin: United States
- Manufacturer: Beechcraft
- Status: Canceled
- Primary user: United States Army Air Forces
- Number built: 2

History
- First flight: 7 May 1944

The Beechcraft XA-38 "Grizzly" was a World War II-era ground attack aircraft, developed by Beechcraft, but never put into production. The Grizzly was to have been fitted with a forward-firing 75 mm cannon to penetrate heavily armored targets.

While the first prototype flew on 7 May 1944, testing established that the type would not be ready for the projected invasion of Japan. It also featured the Wright R-3350 engines already in use with the Boeing B-29 Superfortress—which had priority. Consequently, the XA-38 was canceled after a second prototype had been completed.

== Design and development ==
The United States Army Air Forces awarded the Beech Aircraft Corporation a contract in December 1942 for two prototypes for their Model 28 "Destroyer". Initially the Model 28 had been a bomber-destroyer design but shifted to give a powerful ground attack aircraft to replace the Douglas A-20 Havoc, with the ability to hit "hardened" targets like tanks and bunkers and to attack coastal shipping. This capability was achieved through a 75 mm cannon with 20 rounds, mounted in a fixed position on the nose as well as two .50 cal (12.7 mm) M2 Browning machine guns firing forward. Defensive armament consisted of remotely controlled ventral and dorsal turrets, each armed with twin .50 cal (12.7 mm) machine guns. There were to be two crew members, a pilot and an observer/gunner in the rear cabin, using periscope sights to aim the guns.

== Testing ==
On 7 May 1944, Beech test pilot Vern Carstens flew the XA-38 on its maiden flight from the company's Wichita, Kansas airfield.

During testing, the XA-38 prototypes were flown by USAAF pilots and serviced by military personnel, proving to be reliable and establishing a high level of serviceability. The aircraft proved satisfactory in all respects and better than expected in some, including top speed. The armament proved especially effective; however the B-29 had priority for the Wright R-3350 engines, and when sufficient engines had become available despite the B-29's priority, the war was nearly over and no production was ordered.

Instead, one prototype was scrapped and the other, intended for the USAF Museum, had an unknown fate.

== Specifications ==
Data from Plane Facts: The big gun Beech

General characteristics

- Crew: 2
- Length: 51 ft 9 in (15.77 m)
- Wingspan: 67 ft 4 in (20.52 m)
- Height: 15 ft 6 in (4.72 m)
- Wing area: 626 sq ft (58.2 m^{2})
- Empty weight: 22,480 lb (10,197 kg)
- Max takeoff weight: 35,265 lb (15,996 kg)
- Powerplant: 2 × Wright R-3350-43 air-cooled radial engines, 2,300 hp (1,700 kW) each

Performance

- Maximum speed: 370 mph (600 km/h, 320 kn)
- Range: 1,625 mi (2,615 km, 1,412 nmi)
- Service ceiling: 29,000 ft (8,800 m)
- Rate of climb: 2,600 ft/min (13 m/s)

Armament

- Guns:
  - 1 × T15E1 75 mm cannon (20 rounds)
  - 6 × .50 caliber (12.7 mm) M2 Browning machine guns (2 forward-facing, 2 in ventral turret, 2 in dorsal turret)

== See also ==
Aircraft of comparable role, configuration, and era

- Breda Ba.88 Lince – 1936 Italian aircraft
- Bristol Beaufighter – British heavy fighter aircraft of WWII
- Bristol Brigand – Attack aircraft family by Bristol
- Douglas A-20 Havoc – American light bomber and attack aircraft of World War II
- Douglas A-26 Invader – 1941 attack/bomber aircraft family by Douglas

Related lists

- List of aircraft of World War II
- List of military aircraft of the United States
