= Nakajima C6N Saiun =

Japanese carrier-based reconnaissance aircraft

C6N Saiun
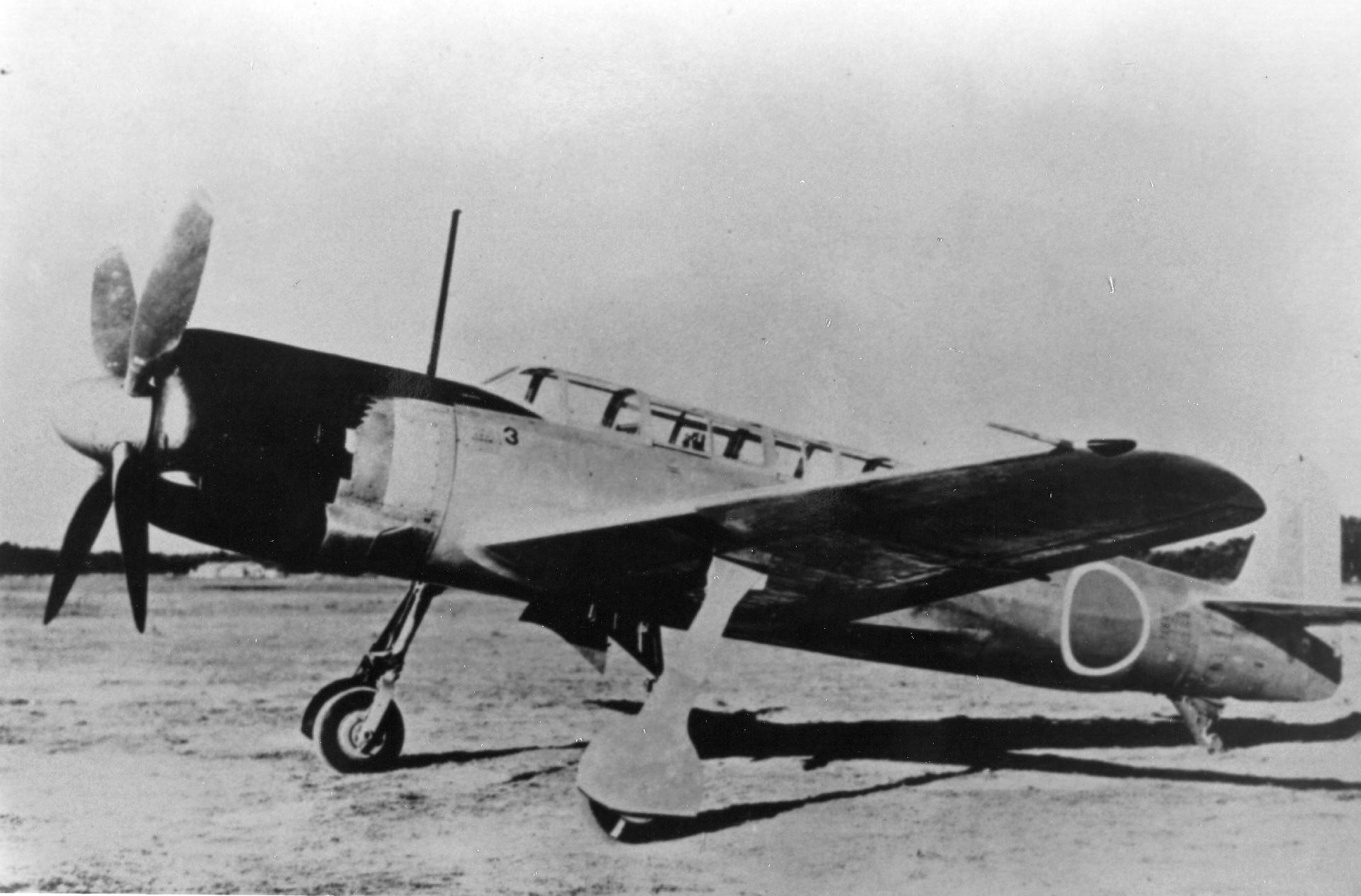
- Nakajima C6N1

General information
- Type: Carrier-based reconnaissance aircraft
- National origin: Empire of Japan
- Manufacturer: Nakajima Aircraft Company
- Primary user: Imperial Japanese Navy Air Service
- Number built: 463

History
- Introduction date: 1944
- First flight: 15 May 1943
- Retired: 1945

The Nakajima C6N Saiun (彩雲, "Iridescent Cloud") is a carrier-based reconnaissance aircraft designed and produced by the Japanese aviation manufacturer Nakajima Aircraft Company. Flown by the Imperial Japanese Navy Air Service (IJNAS) during World War II, the Allied reporting name was Myrt. A relatively advanced design for its time, it was the fastest carrier-based aircraft to be under service by Japan during the conflict.

The C6N started development early on in the Pacific War, recognising that using torpedo bombers for the reconnaissance mission was sub-optimal. The 17-Shi specification issued in early 1942 was relatively demanding; the designers realised that a relatively low-drag aircraft, comprising a narrow fuselage and laminar flow wing, would be necessary, along with a powerplant arrangement capable of producing roughly 2,000 hp (1,500 kW). Performing its maiden flight on 15 May 1943, the Nakajima Homare engine selected to power that aircraft proved to be troublesome, underperforming at altitude and limiting the aircraft's speed. Despite this shortfall, officials instructed to proceed with quantity production in early 1944.

Introduced to IJN service in 1944, the C6N1 was deployed during the Battle of the Marianas, where it proved be nearly impossible to intercept by United States Navy Grumman F6F Hellcats. In response to the Boeing B-29 Superfortress bombing campaign against the Japanese home islands, the C6N1-S night fighter was introduced; it proved to be the fastest night fighter available to the Japanese defenders, although its lack of air-to-air radar somewhat hampered its effectiveness. Additional models were at various stages of development at the time of the Surrender of Japan, after which the type was promptly withdrawn from service. Several examples have been preserved into the twenty-first century.

== Development and design ==
The origins of the Nakajima C6N Saiun can be traced back to the military experience garnered during the opening months of the Pacific War; specifically, at the start of the conflict, the standard operating practice of the Imperial Japanese Navy (IJN) prescribed aerial reconnaissance missions to its torpedo bombers. Real world experience had shown this arrangement to be less than satisfactory and that there was a vacant niche for a fast carrier-capable long range reconnaissance aircraft. To this end, in early 1942, the 17-Shi specification was issued; it called for a carrier-based reconnaissance aircraft that possessed a maximum speed of 350 knots (650 km/h) at 6,000 m and a range of 2,500 nautical miles (4,960 km). Furthermore, it was stipulated that the envisioned aircraft's landing speed would be no greater than 70 knots and be capable of climbing to an altitude of 6,000 m within eight minutes.

Nakajima's design team quickly recognised that fulfilling this specification would require a relatively low-drag airframe to be produced. To this end, considerable efforts were made to keep the aircraft as compact as feasibly possible. The design team's initial proposal, which was internally designated N-50, featured an atypical powerplant situation of two 1,000 hp (750 kW) engines housed in tandem within the fuselage; these engines drove two propellers mounted on the leading edge of the wings via an extension gear arrangement. However, in light of the successful development of the Nakajima Homare engine, which was intended to produce up to 2,000 hp (1,500 kW), it was decided to abandon work on the dual powerplant configuration in favour of a more conventional single-engine layout, which was expected to present less maintenance challenges.

The resulting aircraft possessed a relatively lengthy and extremely narrow cylindrical fuselage that was just large enough in diameter to accommodate the engine, although it was so restrictive that the oil cooler had to be mounted externally. In order to keep the aircraft's length within the limits of the IJN's carrier elevators, the surfaces of the vertical stabilizer was angled forwards. It was fitted with a compact low-mounted laminar flow wing, inside of which were six integral fuel tanks with a total capacity of 1,360 litres, four of which were protected. In order to achieve the stipulated landing speed, both Fowler and split flaps were fitted to the wing along with leading-edge slats.

The crew of three sat in tandem under a single glazed canopy; to aid in performing observations, numerous windows and camera portholes were present along both the bottom and sides of the fuselage. For self-defence, it was provisioned with a tingle flexibly-mounted rear-facing 7.92 mm machine gun that was operated by the radio operator. It was powered by a single Homare 11 engine, capable of outputting up to 1,820 hp, which drove a four-bladed constant-speed propeller.

In March 1943, one month behind schedule, the first C6N prototype was completed; on 15 May 1943, it performed its maiden flight. During flight testing, this prototype exhibited favourable handling characteristics, however, it also presented considerable issues pertaining to the Homare engine, which provided less power than the manufacturer's figures, especially at altitude, and thus prevented the aircraft to attaining the specification's speed requirement. A total of 19 prototypes and pre-production aircraft were completed between March 1943 and April 1944, some of which were powered by the improved Homare 21 engine along with a three-bladed constant-speed propeller and a shorter oil radiator. During testing, the aircraft was able to attain 639 km/h (345 kn; 397 mph).

Despite failing to meet the stipulated speed, the C6N possessed greater speed and range than the Yokosuka D4Y Suisei, which was the incumbent aircraft typically used for IJN carrier-based reconnaissance missions. Accordingly, in early 1944, Nakajima was instructed to proceed with quantity production, the type receiving the service designation Navy Reconnaissance Plane Saiun (Painted Cloud) Model 11. A total of 463 aircraft were produced.

== Operational history ==
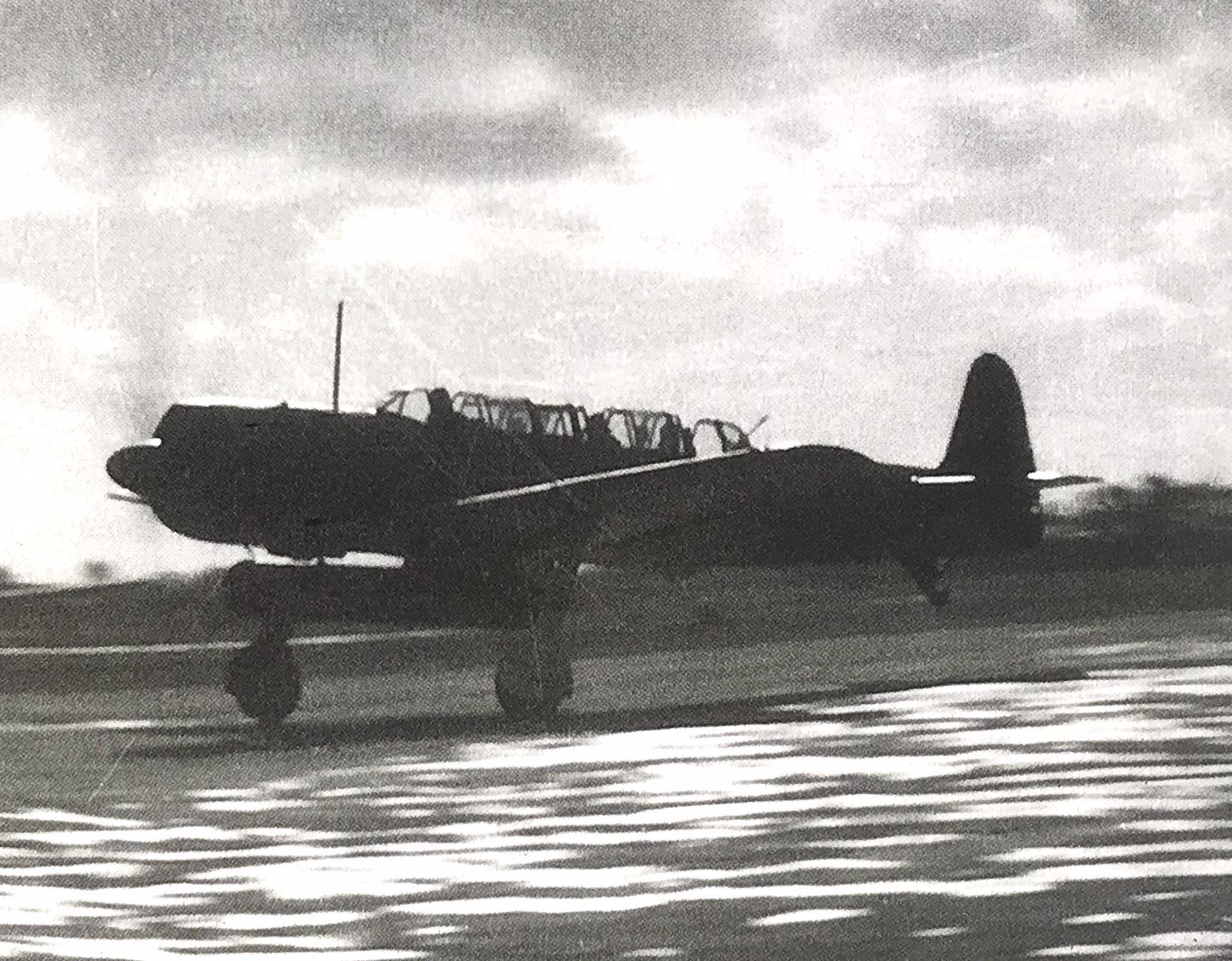
A C6N of the 762nd Kōkūtai taking off from Katori airbase for a mission, 1945.

Although designed for carrier use, by the time the C6N entered service in September 1944, there were few Japanese carriers left for it to operate from, thus the majority were operated from land bases instead. Its speed was exemplified by a telegraph sent after a successful mission: "No Grummans can catch us." ("我に追いつくグラマンなし").

The first major operation to involve the C6N1 was the Battle of the Marianas, during which it flew long distance sorties to shadow the US fleet with little risk of interception.

In response to increasing bombing raids on the Japanese home islands by the Boeing B-29 Superfortress, the IJN opted to introduce a night fighter version of the aircraft. Designated C6N1-S, these were armed with oblique-firing (Schräge Musik configuration) single 30 mm (or dual 20 mm) cannon and were converted from existing C6N1s. The C6N1-S was the fastest night fighters used during the conflict, although relatively few aircraft were ever in service. While it retained its performance despite the added weight of night fighting equipment, achieved via the elimination of the third crew member, the C6N1's effectiveness was hampered by a lack of air-to-air radar.

Seeking a more powerful night fighter, the C6N2 Saiun-kai started development late into the conflict. A single prototype, equipped with a turbocharged engine that drove a four-bladed propeller, was built. However, it was still undergoing flight testing and engine-related troubleshooting when Japan surrendered, ending the conflict and the need for the aircraft.

A C6N1 shot down at 05:40 on 15 August 1945 has been claimed to have been the last confirmed aerial victory of World War II.

A torpedo carrying C6N1-B was also proposed, but this role was not needed after most of Japan's aircraft carriers were destroyed.

== Variants ==
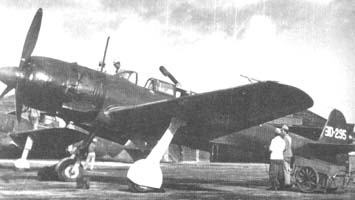
C6N1-S night fighter variant. Note the obliquely mounted 30 mm (1.2 in) cannon in the fuselage of plane ヨD-295.

Source:Famous Airplanes of the World

C6N1 Experimental Number 17 carrier reconnaissance plane (17試艦上偵察機, 17-Shi Kanjō Teisatsuki)
Three prototypes and sixteen supplementary prototypes produced, four-blade propeller; latter batch were equipped three-blade propeller, mounted Nakajima NK9K-L Homare 22 engine, No. 6 was mounted Nakajima NK9H Homare 21 engine. Renamed "Test production Saiun" (試製彩雲, Shisei Saiun) in July 1943.
C6N1 Saiun Model 11 (彩雲11型, Saiun 11-gata)
General production model. Three-blade propeller, mounted Nakajima NK9H Homare 21 engine.

C6N1-B Saiun Model 21 (彩雲21型, Saiun 21-gata)
Proposed torpedo bomber version. Only a project.
C6N1-S Saiun Model 11 Night Fighter variant (彩雲11型改造夜戦, Saiun 11-gata Kaizō yasen)
Temporary rebuilt two-seat night fighter version; this was not a regulation naval aircraft. Development code C6N1-S was not discovered in the IJN official documents. One model with a single 30 mm (1.2 in) Type 2 cannon was built in June 1945, and at least five models with ×2 20 mm (0.79 in) Type 99-1 cannon were converted from standard C6N1 models. One surviving example of the ×2 20 mm (0.79 in) cannon variant is stored in the Paul E. Garber Preservation, Restoration, and Storage Facility. The 30 mm (1.2 in)version was only used to attack B-29s once, on August 1, 1945. The destructive power of the Type 2 cannon extended to twisting the skin of the Saiun's lightweight fuselage.

C6N2 Test production Saiun Kai / Saiun Model 12 (試製彩雲改/彩雲12型, Shisei Saiun Kai/Saiun 12-gata)
Fitted with four-blade propeller, 1,980 PS (1,456 kW) Nakajima NK9L-L Homare 24-Ru turbocharged engine. The Hitachi 92 turbocharger was fitted with the aim of improving high altitude performance; target speed was 345 kn (639 km/h; 397 mph) at 8,500 m (27,900 ft). One prototype (コ–C6T1) was converted from a regular C6N1 in February 1945 and first flew in July of that year. The installation of an oil cooler and an intercooler necessitated a sizable cowling to be installed beneath the engine.
C6N3 Test production Saiun Kai 1 (試製彩雲改1, Shisei Saiun Kai 1)
Proposed high-altitude night fighter version of the C6N2. Dual 20 mm (0.79 in) cannons were installed. Only a project.
C6N4 Test production Saiun Kai 2 (試製彩雲改2, Shisei Saiun Kai 2)
Fitted 2,200 hp (1,600 kW) Mitsubishi MK9A Ha 43-11 Ru turbocharged engine, one prototype was converted from C6N1, incomplete.
C6N5 Test production Saiun Kai 3 (試製彩雲改3, Shisei Saiun Kai 3)
Proposed torpedo bomber version. Only a project.
C6N6 Test production Saiun Kai 4 (試製彩雲改4, Shisei Saiun Kai 4)
Wooden aircraft model. Only a project.

== Operators ==
Japan

- Imperial Japanese Navy Air Service
- Naval Air Group
  - Yokosuka Kōkūtai
  - 121st Kōkūtai
  - 131st Kōkūtai
  - 132nd Kōkūtai
  - 141st Kōkūtai
  - 171st Kōkūtai
  - 210th Kōkūtai
  - 302nd Kōkūtai
  - 343rd Kōkūtai
  - 701st Kōkūtai
  - 723rd Kōkūtai
  - 752nd Kōkūtai
  - 762nd Kōkūtai
  - 801st Kōkūtai
  - 1001st Kōkūtai
- Aerial Squadron
  - Reconnaissance 3rd Hikōtai
  - Reconnaissance 4th Hikōtai
  - Reconnaissance 11th Hikōtai
  - Reconnaissance 12th Hikōtai
  - Reconnaissance 102nd Hikōtai
- Kamikaze
  - 1st Mitate Special Attack Group (picked from 752nd Kōkūtai)
  - Sairyū Unit (picked from 752nd Kōkūtai, no sorties)
  - Saiun Unit (picked from 723rd Kōkūtai, no sorties)

== Surviving aircraft ==
One C6N1-S Model 11 Myrt was captured at the end of the conflict in Japan and was selected by US forces for further technical evaluation in the United States. In early November 1945, embarked aboard USS Barnes (CVE-20) as one of 145 Japanese aircraft and departed on 3 November 1945, for the United States. On 8 December 1945, this Myrt arrived at Langley Field, Virginia. Later, transferred from the U.S. Navy (USN) to the U.S. Army Air Force (USAAF). This plane was overhauled at the Air Depot at Olmsted Field (Olmsted Air Force Base) in Middletown, Pennsylvania for flight testing. Details about any flight test are unknown. In 1949, it was turned over to the National Air and Space Museum (NASM). Afterwards, disassembled and transported to the NASM Garber Facility and placed into storage where it remains to this day disassembled as the fuselage and engine. This aircraft is not currently on public display.

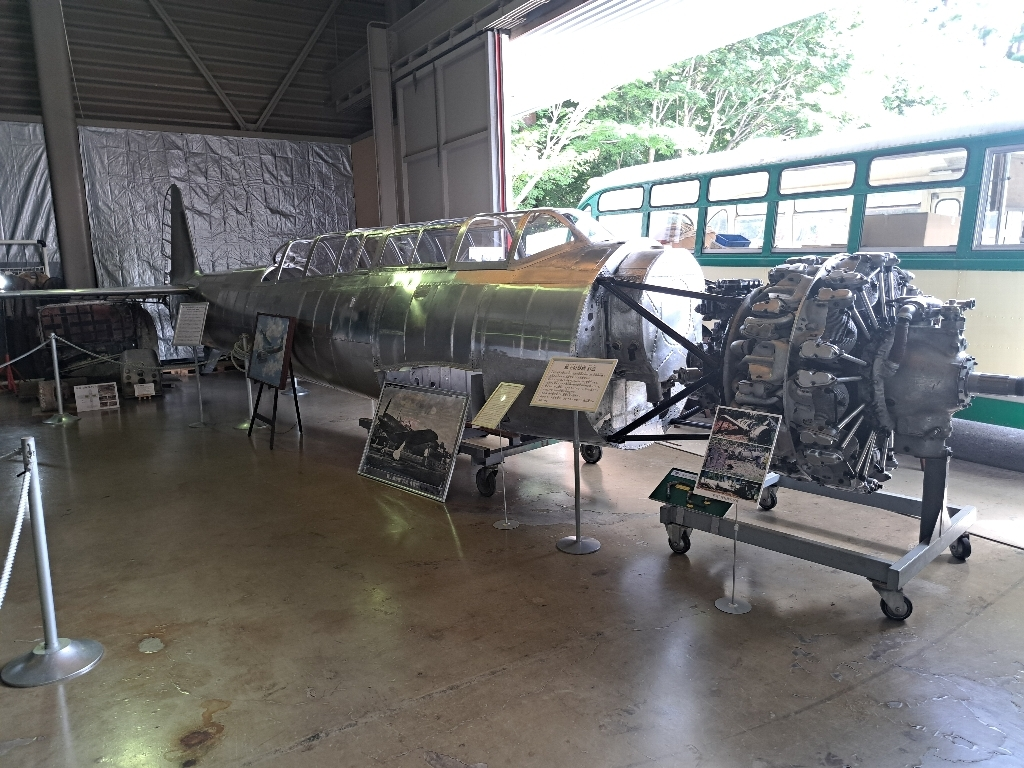
C6N1 Model 11 "Myrt" that is being restored at the Kawaguchi Motor Museum/Fighter Museum in 2025.

Another C6N (C6N1 Model 11) was abandoned following the Surrender of Japan at Moen No. 1 Airfield (Chuuk Airport) on Moen Island. In the early 2000s, the Myrt was salvaged by a local and placed into storage on Moen Island. Later, it was shipped to the United States and sold to Nobuo Harada before being shipped to Japan and became part of the Kawaguchiko Motor Museum / Fighter Museum and is currently being restored to static display. On 1 August 2023, it was unveiled to the public at the museum.

There is also another C6N1 Model 11 that sits at the bottom of Truk Lagoon, abandoned there by US forces after WWII.

== Specifications (C6N1) ==
Data from Japanese Aircraft of the Pacific War

General characteristics

- Crew: 3
- Length: 11 m (36 ft 1 in)
- Wingspan: 12.5 m (41 ft 0 in)
- Height: 3.96 m (13 ft 0 in)
- Wing area: 25.5 m^{2} (274 sq ft)
- Airfoil: root: K151; tip: K159
- Empty weight: 2,968 kg (6,543 lb)
- Gross weight: 4,500 kg (9,921 lb)
- Max takeoff weight: 5,260 kg (11,596 lb)
- Powerplant: 1 × Nakajima NK9B Homare 11 18-cylinder air-cooled radial piston engine, 1,485 kW (1,991 hp)
- Propellers: 3-bladed

Performance

- Maximum speed: 610 km/h (380 mph, 330 kn) at 6,100 m (20,000 ft)
- Cruise speed: 390 km/h (240 mph, 210 kn)
- Ferry range: 5,300 km (3,300 mi, 2,900 nmi) (with auxiliary fuel)
- Service ceiling: 10,470 m (34,350 ft)
- Time to altitude: 6,000 m (19,700 ft) in eight minutes and nine seconds
- Wing loading: 176 kg/m^{2} (36 lb/sq ft)
- Power/mass: 0.33 kW/kg (0.20 hp/lb)

Armament

- Guns: 1× flexibly mounted rearward-firing 7.92 mm Type 1 machine gun

== See also ==
Aircraft of comparable role, configuration, and era

- Fairey Fulmar
- Mitsubishi Ki-46

Related lists

- List of aircraft of World War II
- List of military aircraft of Japan
