= Wright R-4090 Cyclone 22 =

Radial piston engine

R-4090 Cyclone 22
- Type: 22-cylinder air-cooled two-row radial piston engine
- National origin: United States
- Manufacturer: Wright Aeronautical
- First run: 1943
- Number built: c. 3
- Developed from: Wright R-3350 Duplex-Cyclone

The Wright R-4090 Cyclone 22 was an American experimental radial piston engine designed and built in prototype form by Wright Aeronautical during the 1940s.

== Design and development ==
During the 1940s, Wright Aeronautical Corporation was constantly in competition with Pratt & Whitney for new engine designs required for civil and military aircraft. Utilizing the Wright R-3350 Duplex-Cyclone as a basis, Wright developed a 22-cylinder engine, using R-3350 cylinders arranged as a two-row radial engine with 11 cylinders per row instead of 9.

The air-cooled R-4090 was rated to deliver 3,000 hp (2,200 kW) at 2,800 rpm for take-off, from a total displacement of 4,092 cu in (67.06 L), with a compression ratio of 6.85:1. Improved performance was expected from the R-4090 if there had been further development. A two-speed single-stage supercharger helped maintain rated power to higher altitudes.

The core of the engine was a forged steel crankcase which enclosed the three piece two-throw crankshaft. The cylinders were arranged equally around the crankcase, with each row off-set by 16.3636^{.}° to ensure cooling airflow. Accessories similar to other Cyclone engines were arranged around the rear face of the crankcase and a 0.333:1 planetary reduction gearbox at the front.

Although there are no records of failings of the R-4090, the engine was abandoned to allow development of the R-3350 Duplex-Cyclone series.

== Variants ==
XR-4090-1 (790C22AA1)
Drove a single propeller.
R-4090-3 (792C22AA)
Drove a contra-rotating propeller shaft and was intended to have a two-speed reduction gearbox to maximize efficiency in cruising flight.

== Specifications (XR-4090-1) ==
Data from enginehistory.org, Old Machine Press

=== General characteristics ===
- Type: Air-cooled 22 cylinder two-row radial piston engine
- Bore: 6.125 in (155.6 mm)
- Stroke: 6.3125 in (160.3 mm)
- Displacement: 4,092 cu in (67.06 L)
- Length: 91 in (2,300 mm)
- Diameter: 58 in (1,500 mm)
- Dry weight: 3,230 lb (1,470 kg)

=== Components ===
- Valvetrain: One inlet and one Sodium-cooled exhaust over-head valves per cylinder, driven by pushrods and rocker arms.
- Supercharger: 14 in (360 mm) diameter impeller, single-stage two-speed supercharger; gear ratios: of 5 to 1 and 7 to 1.
- Fuel type: Gasoline
- Reduction gear: 0.333:1 planetary reduction gearbox

=== Performance ===
- Power output: 3,000 hp (2,200 kW) at 2,800 rpm for take-off
- Compression ratio: 6.85:1

== See also ==
Related development

- Wright R-3350 Duplex-Cyclone

Comparable engines

- Hitachi Ha-51
