= Hitachi Ha-51 =

Aircraft engine

Ha-51
- Type: Radial engine
- National origin: Japan
- Manufacturer: Hitachi
- First run: 1944
- Number built: 4

The Hitachi Ha-51 (unified designation), was a Japanese air-cooled twenty-two-cylinder twin-row radial aircraft engine designed by Hitachi during the final years of World War II. The first prototype ran in 1944 at a rating of 1,772 kW (2,000 hp), but only four examples were built. In August 1945, development was halted. The engine had yet to find an application and bombing had destroyed the factory where production was to take place.

== Design ==
In 1942, the most powerful Japanese aircraft engine in service produced less than 2,000 hp (1,500 kW) and the Imperial Japanese Army understood that this constrained the development of higher performance aircraft. In response, in December 1942, the Army issued a request for a new radial aircraft engine capable of more than 2,500 hp (1,900 kW) which was to be designated Ha.51. Two companies responded, Nakajima and Hitachi. The Hitachi engine was designed at the company’s engine plant in Tachikawa as a 22-cylinder engine, with cylinders arranged as a two-row radial engine with 11 cylinders per row instead of 9.

The resulting Hitachi design was one of the first radial aircraft engines with more than twenty cylinders developed anywhere in the world. The engine had a steel crankcase, with an aluminium head mounted on steel cylinders each of bore 130 mm (5.1 in) and stroke 150 mm (5.9 in), similar to the eighteen-cylinder Nakajima Homare, but angled at 60° rather than 78° to accommodate the additional four cylinders.

Five engines were ordered and three built. The first ran in 1944. One prototype engine was built and ran for 100 hours on test. The engine reported very high oil consumption, up to 20g/kW⋅h, which was attributed to the rigidity of the crankcase.

The factory was bombed on 24 April 1945 and the programme was halted. The Japanese Army did not have an aircraft available that needed the engine and development had taken substantial resources and these were to redirected to producing engines that had a more immediate need.

== Surviving engines ==
A single example found at Haneda is on display at the museum next to Narita airport.

== Specification ==
Data from The Radial 22 Cylinder Engine "HA51" and Genealogic Survey of the Gasuden Aero-Engines

=== General characteristics ===
- Type: 22-cylinder, twin row, air cooled radial engine
- Bore: 130 mm (5.1 in)
- Stroke: 150 mm (5.9 in)
- Displacement: 43.8 L (2,673 in^{3})
- Length: 2,100 mm (83 in)
- Diameter: 1,270 mm (50 in)
- Dry weight: 1,000 kg (2,200 lb)

=== Components ===
- Supercharger: Mitsubishi 2-speed
- Reduction gear: Planetary (0.42)

=== Performance ===
- Power output:
  - Max power: 1,838 kW (2,465 hp) at 3000 rpm at sea level
  - Rated:
    1,772 kW (2,376 hp) at 3000 rpm at 2,000 m (6,600 ft)
    1,449 kW (1,943 hp) at 3000 rpm at 8,000 m (26,000 ft)

== See also ==
Comparable engines

- BMW 803
- Pratt & Whitney R-4360 Wasp Major
- Wright R-4090 Cyclone 22

Related lists

- List of aircraft engines
