= Boeing XPBB Sea Ranger =

American flying boat patrol bomber prototype

XPBB-1 Sea Ranger
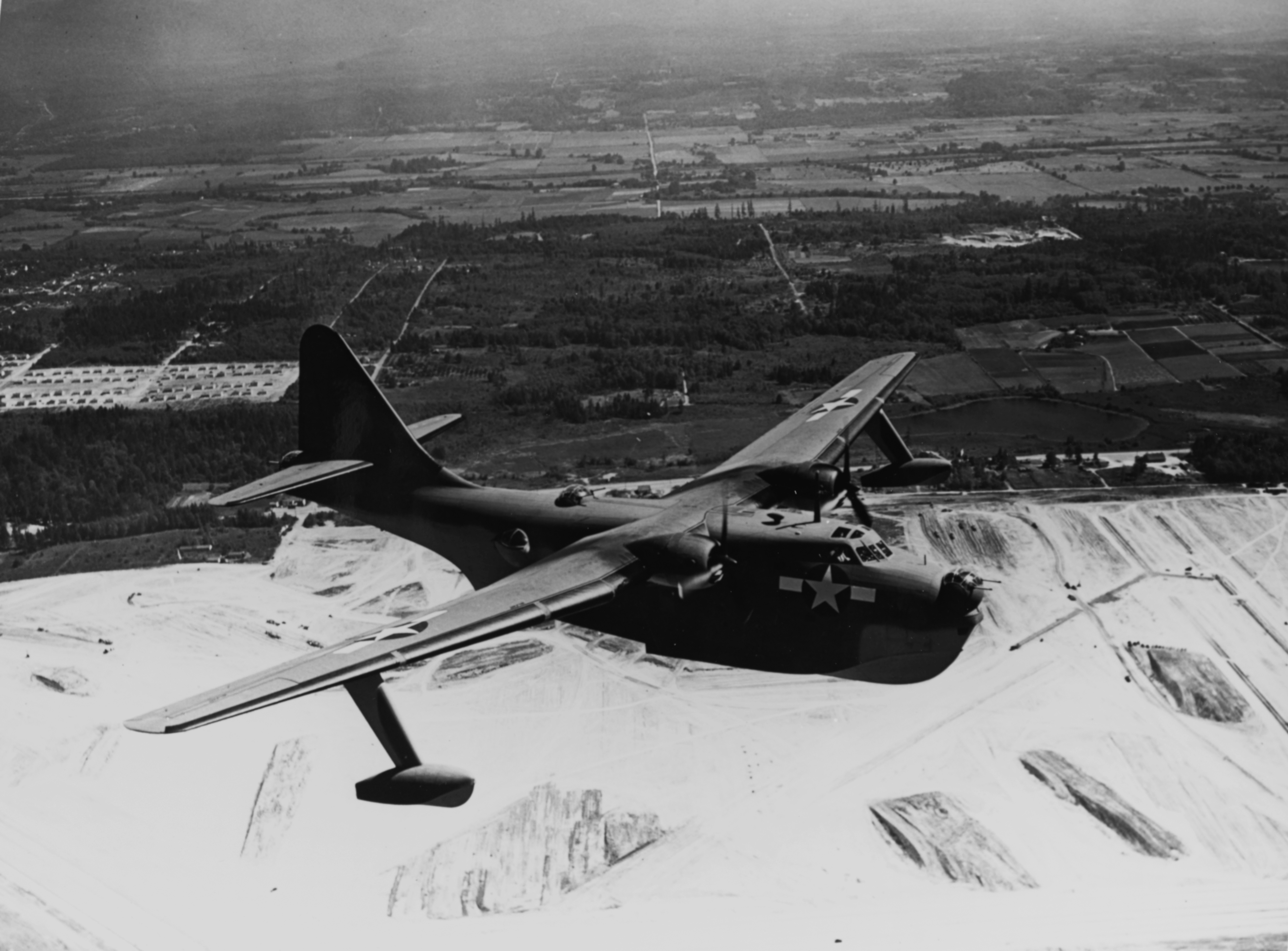

General information
- Type: Prototype patrol bomber
- Manufacturer: Boeing
- Status: Prototype
- Primary user: United States Navy
- Number built: 1

History
- First flight: 9 July 1942
- Retired: 1947

The Boeing XPBB-1 Sea Ranger (Boeing 344) was a prototype twin-engined flying boat patrol bomber built for the United States Navy. The order for this aircraft was canceled to free production capacity to build the Boeing B-29 and only a single prototype was completed.

== Development ==
Well before the United States entered World War II, the Navy started a program to develop a long-range flying boat, able to cover the vast expanse of the Pacific Ocean. The Model 344 design offered by Boeing was chosen, and a contract for 57 aircraft was awarded on 29 June 1940. The designation given to the type was PBB for Patrol Bomber, Boeing, the first aircraft of the PB category built by Boeing for the Navy. Nevertheless, Boeing did have important experience in the construction of large flying boats, having produced the successful Boeing 314 airliner. To build the large PBB, Boeing started construction of a new lakeside factory in Renton, Washington, that was owned by the US Navy. However, the prototype was constructed mostly in Seattle, and was moved to Renton only for completion.

To achieve the desired long range, the PBB became a fairly large aircraft, with a wingspan of 139 feet 8 1/2 inches (42.59 m) and a crew of ten. Despite its size, it was powered by just two Wright R-3350 Duplex Cyclone radial engines, driving three-bladed Curtiss Electric propellers. It was the largest twin-engined flying boat flown during World War II. For a flying boat, the PBB was aerodynamically clean, with a cantilever wing set high on the fuselage. The planing bottom had a single step, and the non-retractable outrigger floats were attached to streamlined, cantilever struts. The lower hull was divided with seven watertight compartments, and a short upper deck provided seating for the cockpit crew. The wing of the PBB was constructed in a center section and two outer panels. The center section carried the engine nacelles and contained the internal bomb bays, as well as fuel and oil tanks. The outer wing panels contained main and auxiliary, integral fuel tanks.

The defensive armament of the PBB consisted of five powered turrets, equipped with Browning .50 M2 machine guns. They were installed in the nose, in the tail, on the upper fuselage just aft of the trailing edge of the wing, and in two waist positions at the rear fuselage. Except for the waist guns, the turrets had two guns each. Offensive armament could consist of up to 20,000 lb of bombs in internal bomb bays in the wing center section (five bays on each side) or of two Mk.13 or Mk.15 torpedoes slung under the wing center section.

The 1710 US gallon auxiliary outer and 1565 US gallon inner fuel tanks were intended to be used only in an overload condition, in which the PBB would use catapult-assisted takeoff to achieve a theoretical range of 11,000 miles (18,000 km). The normal range using the main fuel tanks was 4,245 miles (6,832 km). In March 1941 the Navy's Bureau of Aeronautics asked the Naval Aircraft Factory for a catapult able to launch a PBB-1. The NAF duly prepared a design for a Mark VII catapult that would be able to launch a fifty-ton PBB-1 at a speed of 130 miles per hour. The catapult would be installed so that the flying boat could be lifted onto it with a large crane or hydraulic jacks. However, in the summer of 1942, while development of the Mk.VII catapult was still ongoing, the Navy cancelled the project because it considered JATO assistance at takeoff more practical.

The prototype, designated XPBB-1, made its first flight on 9 July 1942 from Lake Washington. The aircraft handled very well and was considered technically successful. However, already in 1942 the PBB program had been cancelled: The need for a long-range flying boat had been reduced by the ability of land planes such as the Consolidated PB4Y to fly long-range missions over the ocean, and construction of a small number of PBB-1s would have a negative impact on the production rate of the B-29. The Navy allowed the Army to use the Renton factory for the production of B-29 bombers, in return for the use of another factory in Kansas.

The single XPBB-1 was handed over to the US Navy, and was used in trials programs until 1947, when it was finally retired. Despite suggestions that more aircraft might be built, perhaps by another factory, it remained the single example of the type, and was accordingly nicknamed "Lone Ranger".

== Specifications (XPBB-1 Sea Ranger) ==
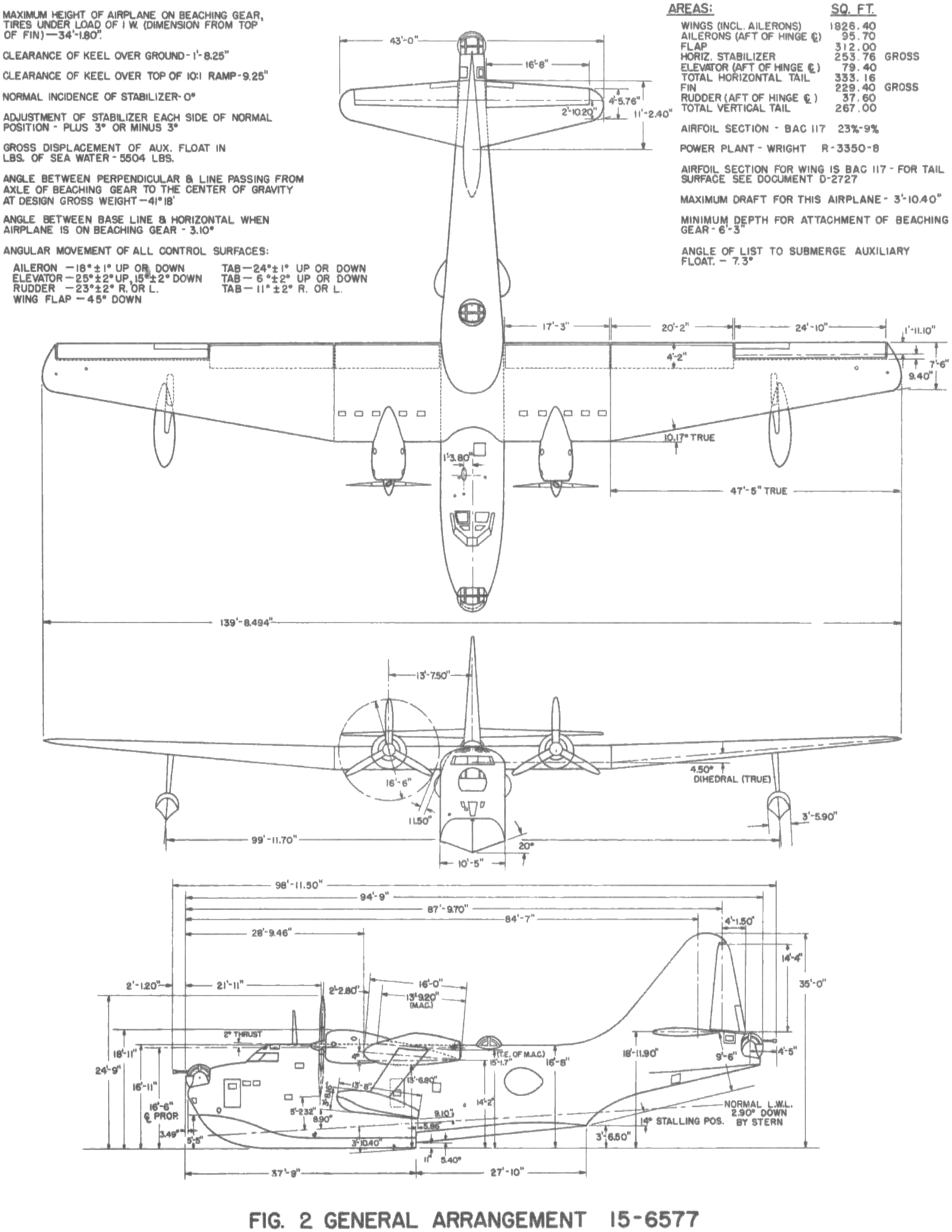
3-view line drawing of the Boeing XPBB-1 Sea Ranger

Data from War Planes of the Second World War: Volume Six

General characteristics

- Crew: 10
- Length: 94 ft 9 in (28.89 m)
- Wingspan: 139 ft 8.5 in (42.59 m)
- Height: 34 ft 2 in (10.42 m)
- Wing area: 1,826 sq ft (169.7 m^{2})
- Empty weight: 41,531 lb (18,878 kg)
- Gross weight: 62,006 lb (28,185 kg)
- Max takeoff weight: 101,130 lb (45,968 kg)
- Powerplant: 2 × Wright R-3350-8 radial engines, 2,300 hp (1,716 kW) each

Performance

- Maximum speed: 186 kn (214 mph, 345 km/h) at sea level
- Range: 5,500 nmi (6,300 mi, 10,000 km) (maximum)
- Normal range: 3,691 nmi (4,248 mi; 6,836 km)
- Service ceiling: 22,400 ft (6,830 m)
- Rate of climb: 980 ft/min (4.98 m/s)
- Wing loading: 34.0 lb/sq ft (166 kg/m^{2})
- Power/mass: 0.15 hp/lb (0.24 kW/kg)

Armament

- Guns: 8 × .50 in (12.7 mm) machine guns as twin mounts in powered bow, dorsal, and tail turrets and single mounts in waist positions
- Bombs: 20,000 pounds (9,100 kg)

== See also ==
Related lists

- List of bomber aircraft
- List of United States Navy aircraft designations (pre-1962)
- List of military aircraft of the United States
