= Focke-Wulf Fw 238 =

German WWII strategic bomber

Nr. 238

General information
- Type: Strategic bomber project
- National origin: Germany
- Manufacturer: Focke-Wulf

The Focke-Wulf Nr. 238 Fernkampfflugzeug was a four-engine strategic bomber developed by the German aeronautical company Focke-Wulf-Flugzeugbau AG in the early 1940s and remained at the project stage. Designed to the same specifications issued by the Reichsluftfahrtministerium (RLM) which led to the Focke-Wulf Ta 400 and Junkers Ju 390, its development was cancelled by the RLM.

== Design and development ==
In March 1941 the Reichsluftfahrtministerium (ministry of the air, abbreviated RLM), the ministry that during the Nazi period was responsible for the whole aviation of Germany, expressed the need to acquire a new long-range bombardment aircraft capable of carrying a war load of 5,000 kg of bombs with a range of 15,000 km. Focke-Wulf and Junkers responded to the request by starting a project for a large tactical bomber suitable to meet the specifications issued.

Focke-Wulf planned the development of an all-encompassing four-engine aircraft in a trailing configuration that could be equipped with the best engines currently being developed, the BMW 803 of 3 900 PS combined with four-bladed propellers counter-rotating or BMW 801. The baseline design conceived under drawing Nr. 238 had four BMW 803s, a long fuselage integrated the cockpit pressurized for the five (or according to other sources ten) crew members on the front, the ventral bomb compartment and a twin-tail, chosen to improve the field of fire of the two barbette hydraulically driven dorsal turrets equipped with a pair of MG 151/20 gauge 20 mm autocannons. An additional two identical ventral turrets and, optional for the anti-shipping configuration, a gondola equipped with 4 cannons MK 108 caliber 30 mm. The landing gear was the typical tail-wheel configuration, with the two front axle springs cushioned and equipped with twin wheels integrated by a retractible tailwheel. A somewhat smaller four-engine version, equipped with radial BMW 801 D, with a length of 30.6 m by 5.8 m height with a 50 m opening wing and a surface area of 240 m². Although these designs are known in some sources as Fw 238, this was a postwar invention by some aviation historians derived from Nr. 238 for the early BMW-powered Focke-Wulf Fernkampfflugzeug designs.

In reality none of the versions passed the design phase and their development, which according to some estimates could have been completed with a prototype able to fly by the end of 1944, was terminated by an order dated 14 February 1943 in which the RLM required companies to devote themselves as a priority to the development of models to be used in the air defense of the Reich.

== Variants ==
Nr 238
four-engine version equipped with BMW 803 radial engines driving counter-rotating propellers.
Nr. 238H
small four-engine variant, length - 30.6 m (100 ft), height - 5.8 m (19 ft), span - 50 m (160 ft), wing area 240 m^{2} (2,600 sq ft), equipped with BMW 801 engines.

== Specifications (Nr. 238, larger design) ==
Data from Die Deutsche Luftrüstung 1933–1945 Vol.2 – Flugzeugtypen Erla-Heinkel

General characteristics

- Length: 35.3 m (115 ft 10 in)
- Wingspan: 52 m (170 ft 7 in)
- Height: 8.7 m (28 ft 7 in)
- Wing area: 290 m^{2} (3,100 sq ft)
- Empty weight: 55,620 kg (122,621 lb)
- Gross weight: 114,530 kg (252,495 lb)
- Powerplant: 4 × BMW 803 28-cylinder 7-bank liquid-cooled coupled inline radial engine 3,900 PS (3,800 hp; 2,900 kW)
- Propellers: 8-bladed Contra-rotating propeller

Performance

- Maximum speed: 670 km/h (420 mph, 360 kn) at 8,000 m (26,000 ft)
- Cruise speed: 500 km/h (310 mph, 270 kn)
- Landing speed: 130 km/h (81 mph; 70 kn)
- Range: 14,100 km (8,800 mi, 7,600 nmi)
