= BMW 803 =

German aircraft engine

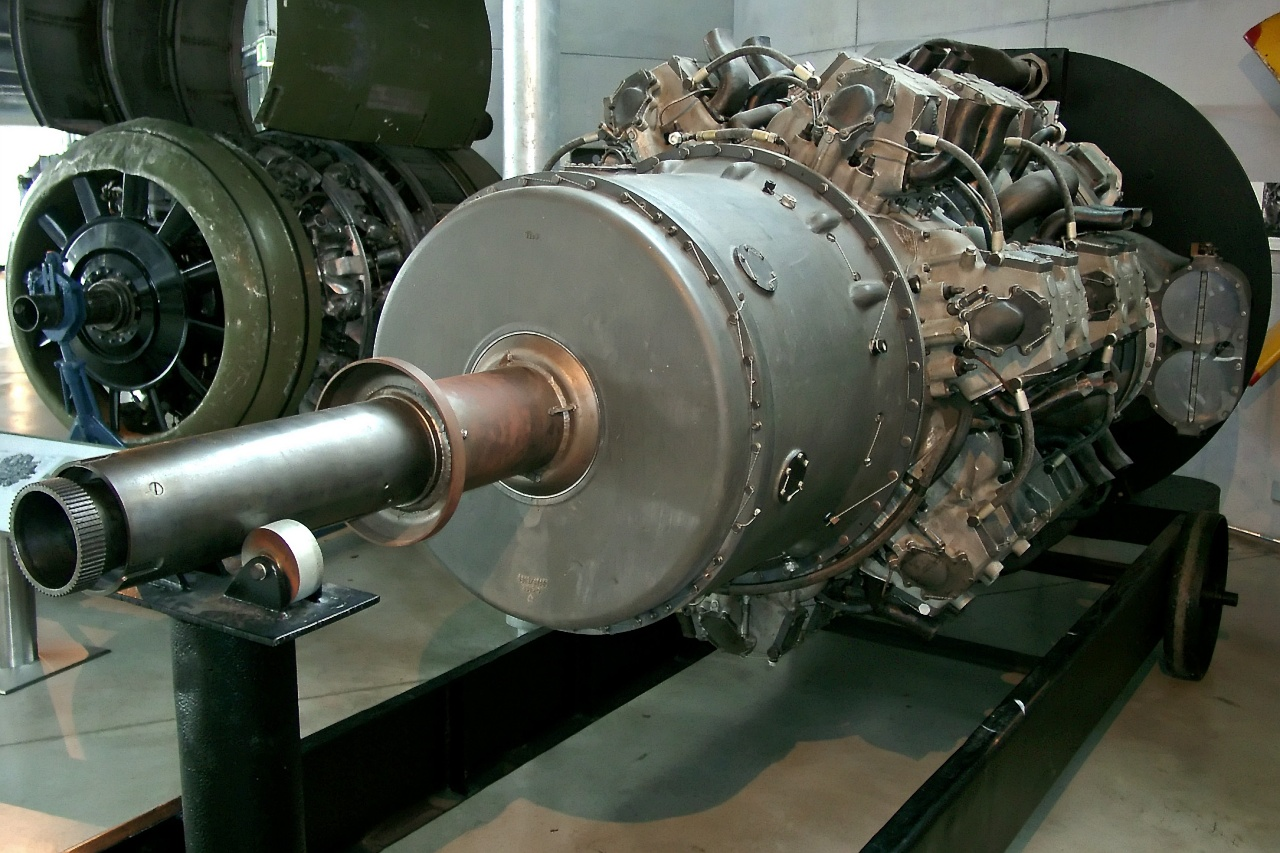
- BMW 803 on display at the Deutsches Museum
- Type: Radial engine
- National origin: Germany
- Manufacturer: BMW
- Developed from: BMW 801

The BMW 803 was a German aircraft engine, an attempt by BMW to build a high-output aircraft engine by coupling two BMW 801 engines back-to-back, driving contra-rotating propellers. The result was a 28-cylinder, four-row radial engine, each comprising a multiple-bank in-line engine with two cylinders in each bank, which, due to cooling concerns, were liquid cooled.

== Design and development ==
One problem with scaling up any piston engine design is that eventually a point is reached where the crankshaft becomes a major engineering challenge. This was a problem that affected almost all engines of the 2,500 hp (1,900 kW) class, including BMW's own 18-cylinder 802 project. For the 803 the engineers decided to avoid this problem by simply not using a common crankshaft, and driving a set of independent contra-rotating propellers. The front engine drove the front propeller directly, while the rear engine drove five smaller auxiliary shafts that passed between the cylinders of the front engine before being geared back together to drive the rear propeller. This layout resulted in a large gearbox on the front of the engine, and the front engine needing an extended shaft to clear the gearbox.

Two additional auxiliary shafts transmitted the power from the front engine to the rear in order to drive the supercharger and accessories of the front engine. This meant that both engines could be operated independently of one another.

The 803 had two valves per cylinder and overhead camshafts. Displacing 83.6 litres, and using the same 156 mm bore and identical stroke measurements as each cylinder of the 801 used, the four-row 803 engine weighed 2,950 kg (6,490 lb) dry, and 4,130 kg (9,086 lb) fully loaded.

For all this weight it delivered 3,900 PS (3,847 hp; 2,868 kW). Although this made it the most powerful German engine design, its power-to-weight ratio was only about 0.98 kW/kg (0.60 hp/lb), comparing rather poorly with other large designs like the Junkers Jumo 222 at 1.7 kW/kg, the primary powerplant design for the advanced Bomber B design competition, which was designed to use only two engines of over 1,500 kW (2,000 hp) output. Specific power of the complex BMW 803 was likewise poor, at about 34.4 kW/L, compared to the 222's 40 kW/L, as was specific fuel consumption, at 380 g/kWh (0.63 lb/hp·h), comparable to late generation turboprops.

As with most coupled engines, like the earlier Daimler-Benz DB 606 and DB 610, the 803 was not a success on the test-bed, and did not enter production. About twelve prototypes were built.

== Aircraft projected for BMW 801/802/803 ==
The engine was intended to be used only on the largest of designs, notably the Focke-Wulf Fw 238, the Focke-Wulf Ta 400 six-engined Amerikabomber design competition competitor, and other large bombers. The big, 6-BMW 801-engined Ta 400 was proposed in 1942 as an upgraded version of the never-produced Focke-Wulf Fw 300, and was meant to compete directly against the Messerschmitt Me 264, Junkers Ju 390, and by the timeframe of February 1943; what became Heinkel's Amerikabomber contract design, the Heinkel He 277 — itself meant to be powered by only a quartet of 1,470 kW (1,973 hp) output BMW 801E radials from the start — for the May 1942-approved Amerika Bomber contract, for a trans-Atlantic range strategic bomber designed to attack New York City from European bases. The projected range was enough for the round trip from France to New York, but it was of course never realized. The Focke-Wulf firm even intended to use the BMW 803 powerplant for single-seat fighter design, and it also appeared on several Blohm & Voss designs as well. None of these designs was particularly inspiring, and as the engine never matured the project was cancelled.

== Engines on display ==
A single example remains in the Deutsches Museum Flugwerft Schleissheim.

== Specifications (BMW 803) ==
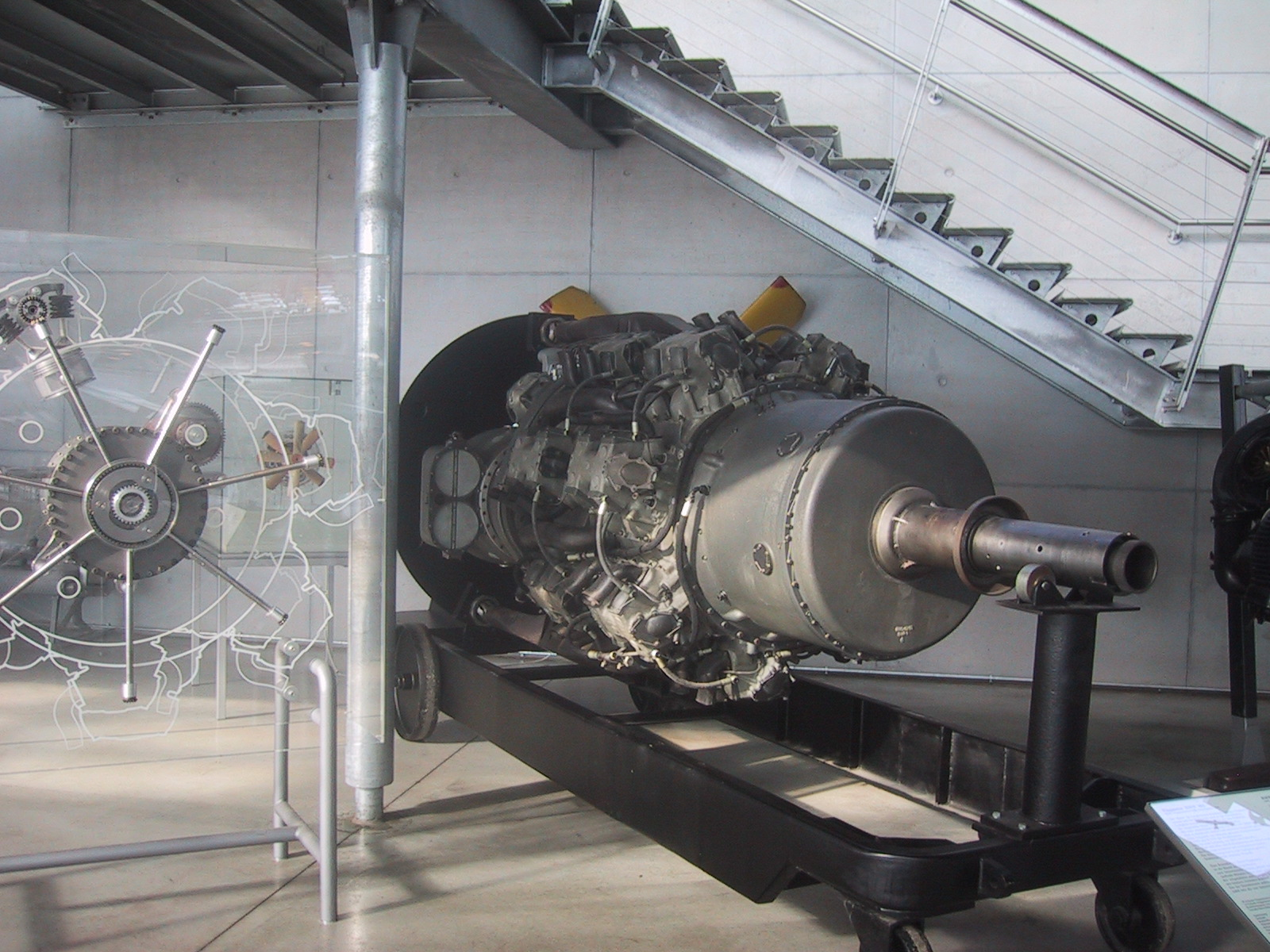
The large gearbox at the front is evident. The display on the left of the engine shows how the overhead cams were driven off the crank via a series of driveshafts

=== General characteristics ===
- Type: 28-cylinder 7-bank liquid-cooled coupled inline radial engine
- Bore: 156 mm (6.14 in)
- Stroke: 156 mm (6.14 in)
- Displacement: 83.5 L (5,095 in³)
- Diameter: 160 cm (63 inches)
- Dry weight: 2,950 kg (6,490 lb)

=== Components ===
- Valvetrain: One intake and one sodium-cooled exhaust valve per cylinder
- Fuel system: Direct fuel injection
- Cooling system: Liquid-cooled

=== Performance ===
- Power output: 2,868 kW (3,847 hp)
- Specific power: 34.4 kW/L (0.76 hp/in³)
- Compression ratio: 6.5:1
- Specific fuel consumption: 380 g/kWh (0.63 lb/hp·h)
- Power-to-weight ratio: 0.972 kW/kg (0.59 hp/lb)

== See also ==
Related development

- BMW 801
- BMW 802

Comparable engines

- Daimler-Benz DB 604
- Dobrynin VD-4K
- Junkers Jumo 222
- Lycoming XR-7755
- Napier Sabre
- Pratt & Whitney R-4360 Wasp Major
- Shvetsov ASh-2
- Wright R-2160 Tornado

Related lists

- List of aircraft engines
