= Wright R-3350 Duplex-Cyclone =

1937 18-cylinder radial piston engine family by Wright

R-3350 Duplex-Cyclone
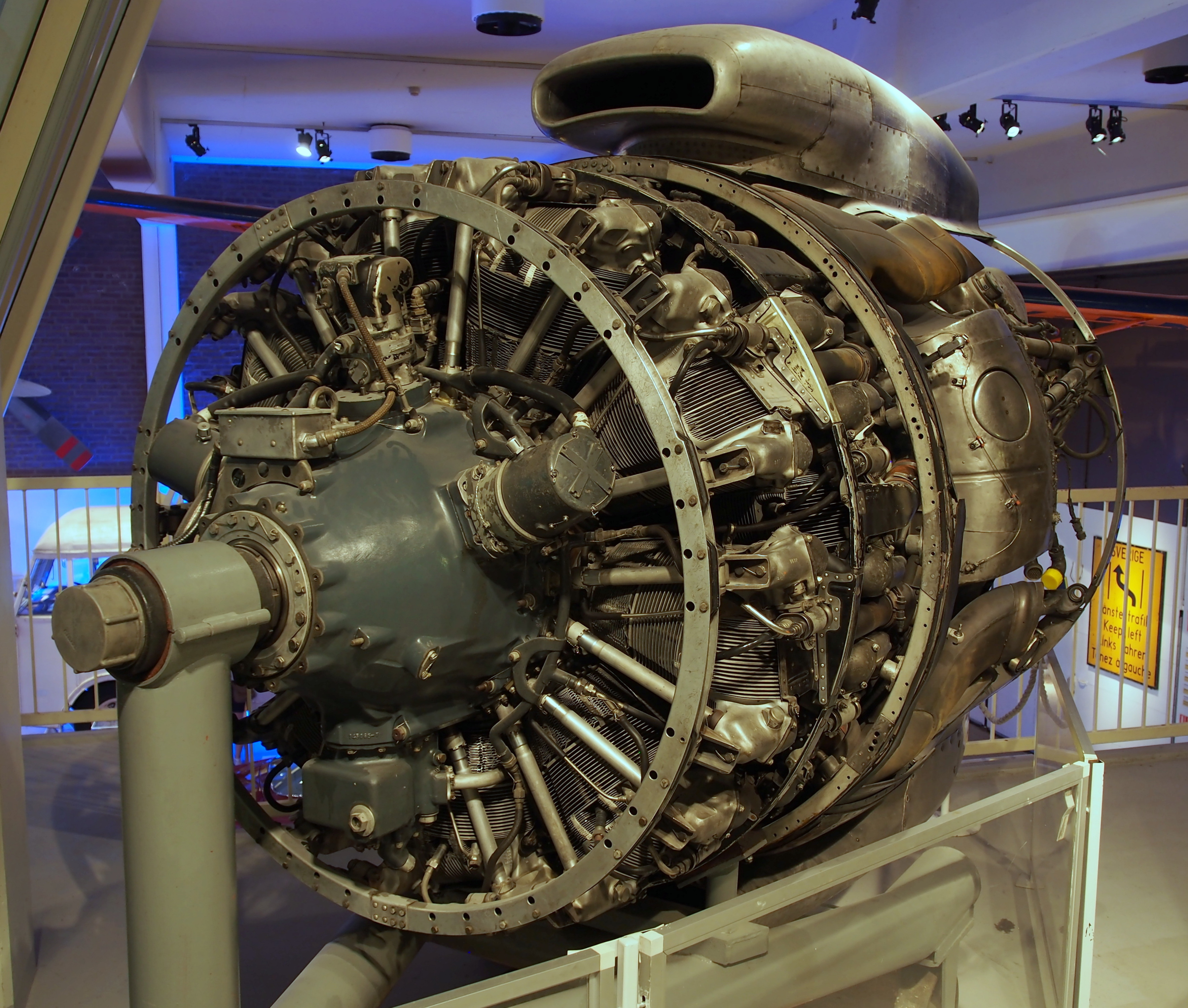
- Wright R-3350 Duplex-Cyclone on display at Malmö Museer – Teknikens och sjöfartens hus (Science and Maritime House), Malmö, Sweden.
- Type: Radial engine
- National origin: United States
- Manufacturer: Wright Aeronautical
- First run: May 1937
- Major applications: Boeing B-29 Superfortress; Fairchild C-119 Flying Boxcar; Douglas A-1 Skyraider; Douglas DC-7; Lockheed Constellation; Lockheed L-1649 Starliner; Lockheed EC-121 Warning Star; Lockheed P-2 Neptune
- Manufactured: March 1938–August 1961
- Number built: 50,192
- Developed from: Wright R-1820 Cyclone
- Developed into: Wright R-4090 Cyclone 22

The Wright R-3350 Duplex-Cyclone is an American twin-row, supercharged, air-cooled, radial aircraft engine with 18 cylinders displacing nearly 3,350 cubic inches (54.9 L). Power ranged from 2,200 to 3,700 hp (1,640 to 2,760 kW), depending on model. Developed before World War II, the R-3350's design required a long time to mature, and was still experiencing problems with reliability when used to power the Boeing B-29 Superfortress.

After the war, the engine had matured sufficiently to be used in many civilian airliners, notably in its turbo-compound forms, and remained in use in the Lockheed L-1049 Super Constellation airliners into the 1950s. Its main rival was the 4,360 in^{3} (71.4 L), 3,000 to 4,300 hp (2,200 to 3,200 kW) Pratt & Whitney R-4360 Wasp Major, which first ran some four years after the Duplex-Cyclone. The engine is commonly used on Hawker Sea Fury and Grumman F8F Bearcat Unlimited Class Racers at the Reno Air Races.

== Design and development ==
In 1927, Wright Aeronautical introduced its "Cyclone" engine, which powered several designs in the 1930s. After merging with Curtiss to become Curtiss-Wright in 1929, an effort was started to design an engine in the 1,000 hp (750 kW) class. The new Wright R-1820 Cyclone 9 first ran in 1935, and became one of the most used aircraft engines in the late 1930s and early 1940's, powering the Boeing B-17 Flying Fortress heavy bomber, General Motors FM-2 Wildcat fighter and Douglas SBD Dauntless dive bomber, among many others.

By 1931 Pratt & Whitney had started a development of their single-row Wasp nine-cylinder engine into the larger and much more powerful fourteen-cylinder, twin-row R-1830 Twin Wasp with a similar 1,800 in^{3} (30 L) displacement that would easily compete with the single-row Cyclone. In 1935, Wright followed P&W's lead and developed larger engines based on the Cyclone. The result was two designs, a 14-cylinder short stroke design of nearly 2,600 in^{3} (43 L) displacement that would evolve into the Wright R-2600 Twin Cyclone, and a much larger 18-cylinder design that became the R-3350. A larger twin-row 22-cylinder version, the Wright R-4090 Cyclone 22, was experimented with as a competitor to the 4,360 in^{3} (71.4 L) displacement four-row, 28-cylinder Pratt & Whitney R-4360 Wasp Major, but was not produced.

With Pratt & Whitney starting development of their own 2,800 in^{3} (46 L) displacement 18-cylinder, twin-row radial as the R-2800 Double Wasp in 1937, Wright's first R-3350 prototype engines with a 3,350 in^{3} (54.9 L) displacement were run in May of the same year. Development was slow due to the complexity, and the R-2600 received development priority. The R-3350 did not fly until 1941, after the Douglas XB-19 had been redesigned to use R-3350s instead of Allison V-3420 inlines.

Things changed dramatically in 1940 with the introduction of a new contract by the USAAC to develop a long-range bomber capable of flying from the US to Germany with 20,000 lb (9,100 kg) of bombs. Although smaller than the Bomber D designs that led to the Douglas XB-19, the new designs required just as much power. When four preliminary designs were presented in mid-1940, three of them used the R-3350. Suddenly, development was a priority, and serious efforts to get it into production began. In 1942, Chrysler started building the Dodge Chicago Plant, which was ready by early 1944.

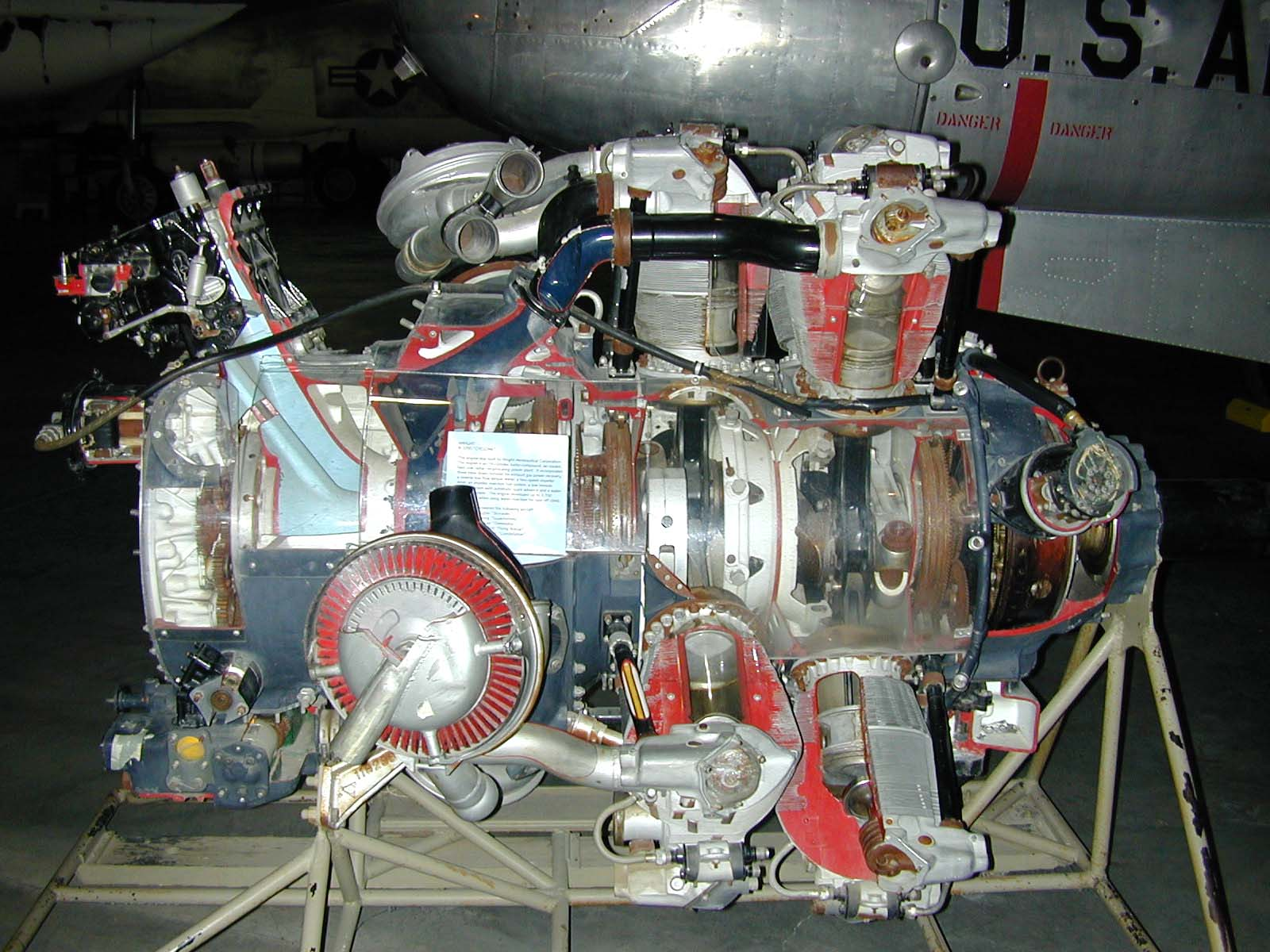
Wright R-3350 Turbo-Compound radial engine. Two exhaust recovery turbines are shown outside the impeller casing area (top (silver) and lower (red blading)) that are geared to the crankshaft.

By 1943, the new Boeing B-29 Superfortress was flying with R-3350s. The engines remained temperamental, and the rear cylinders tended to overheat, partially due to inadequate clearance between the cylinder baffles and the cowl. A number of changes were introduced to improve cooling, and the aircraft was rushed into service in the Pacific in 1944. This proved unwise, as the early B-29s taking off at maximum weights, in the high temperature conditions of the B-29's tropical airfields, caused overheating that was not completely solved, and the engines also had a tendency to swallow valves. Because of a high magnesium content in the crankcase, engine fires could burn with a core temperature approaching 5,600 °F (3,090 °C) which could burn through the main spar in seconds, causing a catastrophic failure.

Early R-3350s used carburetors, though the poorly designed elbow entrance to the supercharger led to serious problems with fuel/air mixtures. Near the end of WWII, the system was changed to use gasoline direct injection, which improved reliability. After the war, the engine was redesigned and became popular for large aircraft, notably the Lockheed Constellation and Douglas DC-7.

Following the war, the Turbo-Compound system was developed to deliver better fuel efficiency. In these versions, three power-recovery turbines (PRTs) were fitted around the rear of the engine, one for each group of six cylinders. The PRTs utilized the velocity energy of the exhaust gas rather than expansion of the exhaust gas, and transmitted power to the crankshaft through reduction gearing and fluid couplings. Compared with a similar non-turbocompounded R-3350, turbocompounding added about 550 hp (410 kW) at take-off power and 240 hp (180 kW) at cruise settings. The fuel burn for the PRT-equipped aircraft was nearly the same as the older Pratt and Whitney R-2800, while producing more useful power. Effective 15 October 1957, a DA-3/DA-4 engine cost $88,200. Turbo-compound R-3350s could achieve specific fuel consumption as low as 0.4 lb/hp/hour (243 g/kWh).

Several racers at the Reno Air Races use R-3350s. Modifications on one, Rare Bear, include a nose case designed for a slow-turning prop, taken from an R-3350 used on the Lockheed L-1649 Starliner, mated to the power section (crankcase, crank, pistons, and cylinders) taken from an R-3350 used on the Douglas DC-7. The supercharger is taken from an R-3350 used on the Lockheed EC-121 and the engine is fitted with nitrous oxide injection. Normal rated power of the original stock R-3350 was 2,800 hp (2,100 kW) at 2,600 rpm and 45 inHg (150 kPa) of manifold pressure. With these modifications, Rare Bear's engine produces 4,000 hp (3,000 kW) at 3,200 rpm and 80 inHg (270 kPa) of manifold pressure, and 4,500 hp (3,400 kW) with nitrous oxide injection.

== Variants ==
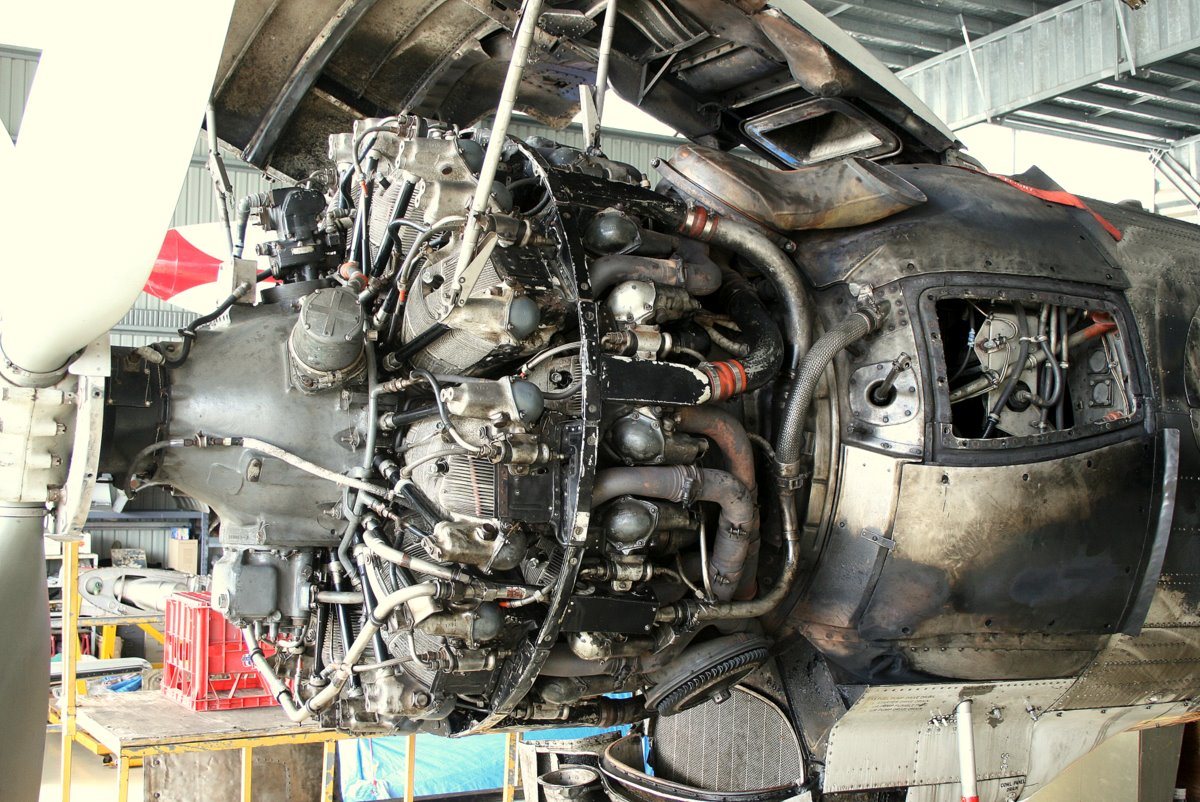
Wright R-3350 Turbo-Compound radial engine fitted at the number four position on the starboard wing of a Lockheed Super Constellation

R-3350-13
2,200 shp (1,640 kW)
R-3350-14
2 built for Douglas SB2D Destroyer project
R-3350-23
2,200 shp (1,640 kW)
R-3350-24W
2,500 shp (1,860 kW)
R-3350-26W
2,800 shp (2,090 kW)
R-3350-30W
3,250 shp (2,420 kW)
R-3350-30WA
3,500 shp (2,610 kW)
R-3350-32W
3,700 shp (2,760 kW)
R-3350-34
3,400 shp (2,540 kW)
R-3350-35A
2,200 shp (1,640 kW)
R-3350-38
3,400 shp (2,540 kW)
R-3350-41
Fuel injected Silverplate variant
R-3350-53
2,700 shp (2,010 kW)
R-3350-57
2,200 shp (1,640 kW)
R-3350-85
2,500 shp (1,860 kW)
R-3350-89A
3,500 shp (2,610 kW)
R-3350-91
3,250 shp (2,420 kW)
R-3350-93W
3,500 shp (2,610 kW)
981TC18EA1
3,700 shp (2,760 kW)
972TC18DA1
Commercial equivalent to the -30W without water injection
956C18CA1
Commercial, similar to the -26W
975C18CB1
Commercial, similar to the 956C18CA1

Note: The R‑3350‑30W, ‑30WA/‑30WB, ‑32W, ‑34, -38, ‑85, ‑89, ‑91 and TC981 variants were turbo‑compound versions. These models used three exhaust‑driven power‑recovery turbines (PRTs), each connected to the crankshaft through a fluid coupling to recover energy from the exhaust flow.

== Applications ==
- Beechcraft XA-38 Grizzly
- Boeing B-29 Superfortress
- Boeing C-97 Stratofreighter
- Boeing XPBB Sea Ranger
- Canadair CP-107 Argus
- Consolidated B-32 Dominator
- Curtiss XBTC
- Curtiss XBT2C
- Curtiss XF14C
- Curtiss XP-62
- Douglas A-1 Skyraider
- Douglas BTD Destroyer
- Douglas DC-7
- Douglas XB-19A
- Douglas XB-31
- Fairchild C-119 Flying Boxcar
- Fairchild AC-119
- Grumman F8F Bearcat (modified racers, including Rare Bear)
- Hawker Sea Fury (modified racers)
- Lockheed Constellation
- Lockheed L-049 Constellation
- Lockheed C-69 Constellation
- Lockheed L-649 Constellation
- Lockheed L-749 Constellation
- Lockheed L-1049 Super Constellation
- Lockheed C-121 Constellation
- Lockheed R7V-1 Constellation
- Lockheed EC-121 Warning Star
- Lockheed L-1649A Starliner
- Lockheed P-2 Neptune
- Lockheed XB-30
- Martin JRM Mars
- Martin XB-33 Super Marauder
- Martin P5M Marlin
- Stroukoff YC-134

== Engines on display ==
- Wright R-3350-34 is on public display at the Aerospace Museum of California.
- Wright R-3350 from a Canadair CP-107 Argus is on public display in the Mackenzie Engineering Building at Carleton University, Ottawa, Ontario, Canada.
- A Wright R-3350 Turbo-Compound is on public display at the Air Zoo in Kalamazoo, Michigan.
- Wright R-3350 on display at the Museum of Aviation (Robins AFB), Warner Robins, Georgia.
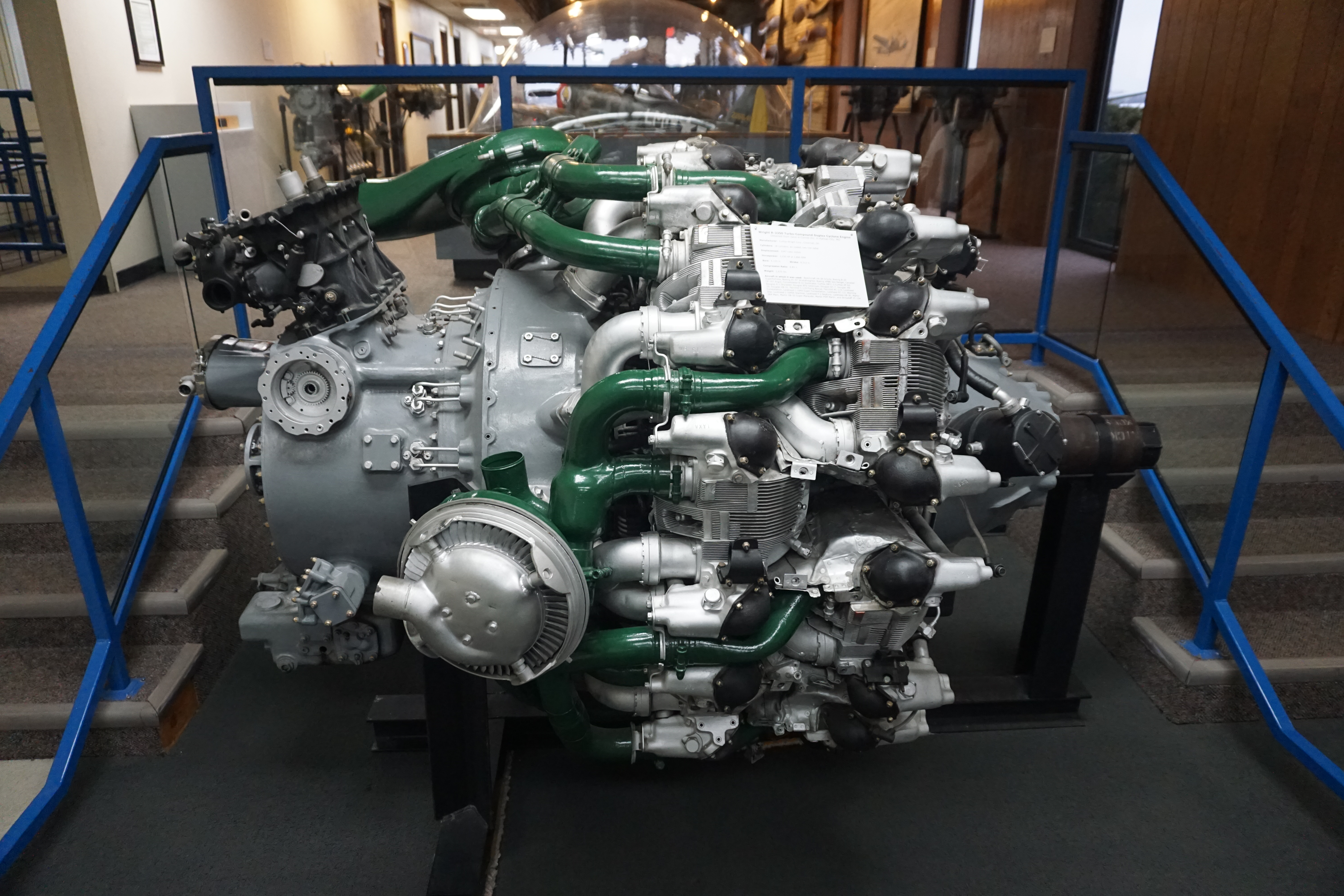
R-3350 on display at the Air Zoo

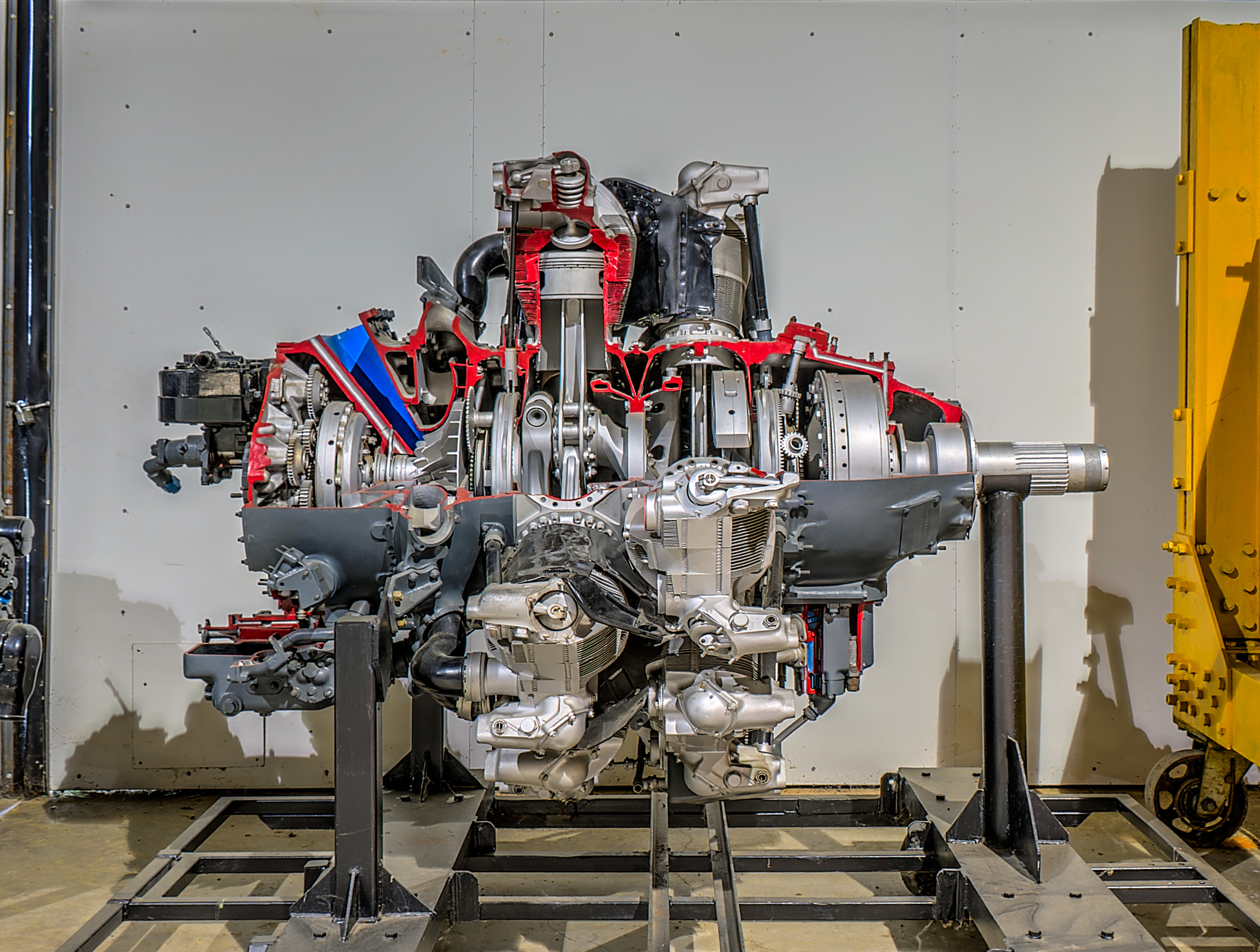
R-3350 on display at Museum of Aviation, Robins AFB

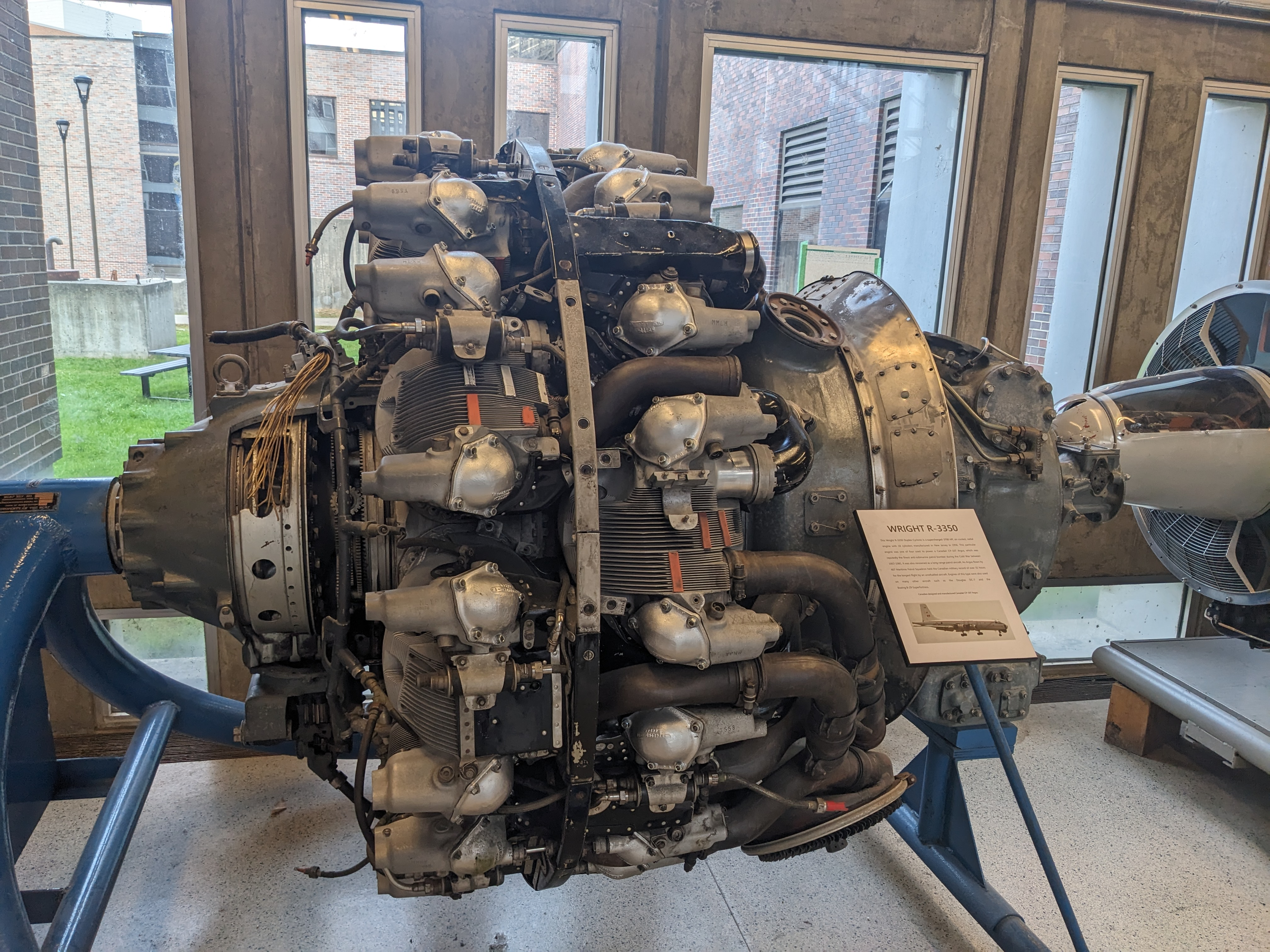
R-3350 on display at Carleton University

== Specifications (R-3350-C18-BA) ==
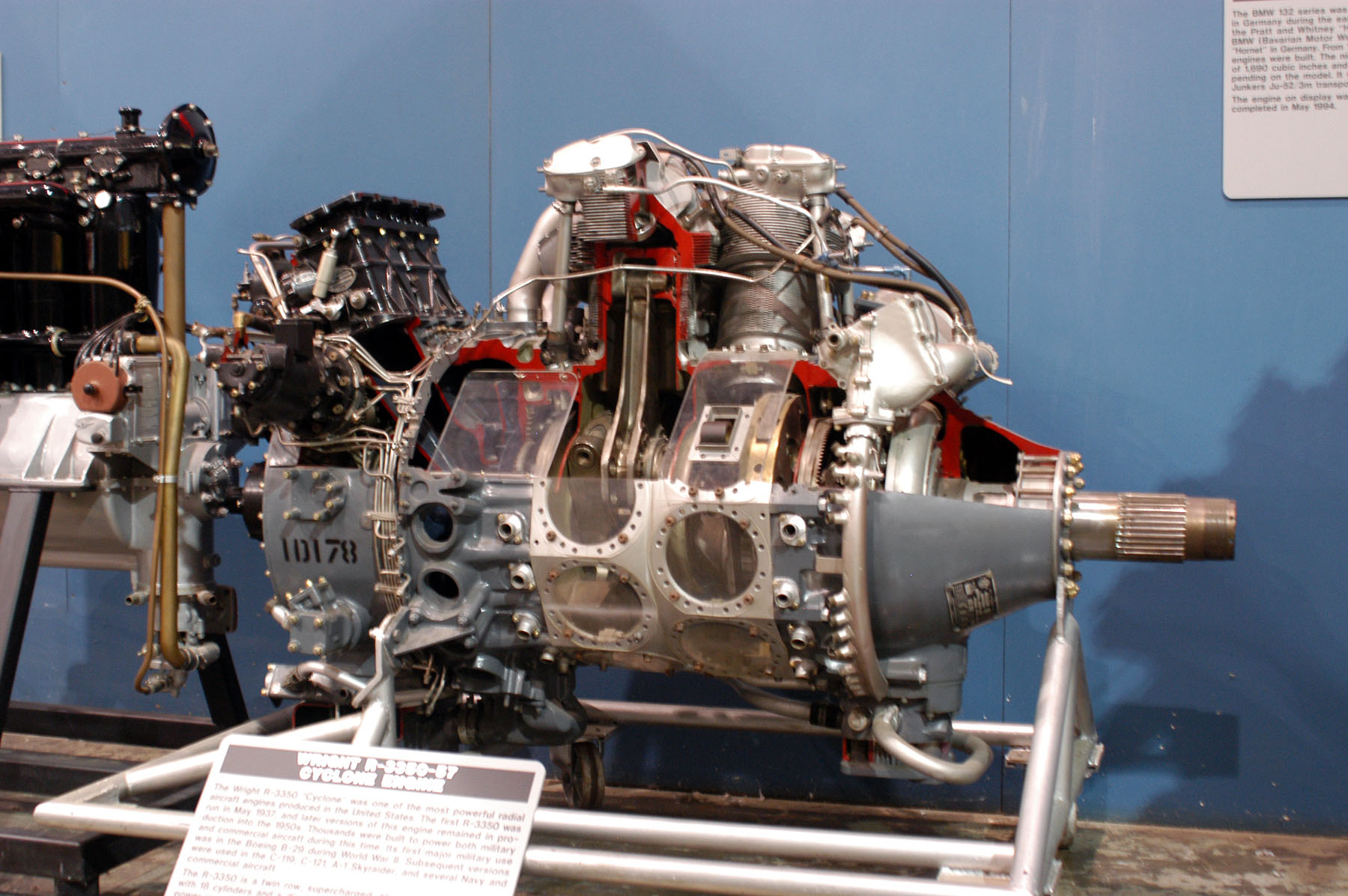
A Wright R-3350 radial engine, showing, R to L, propeller shaft, reduction gearcase, magneto (silver) with wiring, two cylinders (rear with connecting rod), impellor casing (and induction pipe outlets) and injection carburetor (black); separate accessory gearbox at extreme left

Data from

=== General characteristics ===
- Type: Twin-row 18-cylinder radial engine
- Bore: 6.125 in (155.6 mm)
- Stroke: 6.3125 in (160.3 mm)
- Displacement: 3,347.9 in^{3} (54.862 L)
- Length: 76.26 in (1,937 mm)
- Diameter: 55.78 in (1,417 mm)
- Dry weight: 2,670 lb (1,210 kg)

=== Components ===
- Valvetrain: Pushrod, two valves per cylinder
- Supercharger: Two-speed single-stage
- Fuel system: Chandler-Evans downdraft carburetor
- Fuel type: 100/130 RON
- Oil system: Dry sump
- Cooling system: Air-cooled

=== Performance ===
- Power output: 2,200 hp (1,600 kW) at 2,800 rpm (takeoff)
- Specific power: 0.66 hp/in³
- Compression ratio: 6.85:1
- Specific fuel consumption: Takeoff: 0.38 lb/(hp⋅h) (0.17 kg/(hp⋅h); 0.23 kg/kWh)
- Power-to-weight ratio: 0.82 hp/lb

== See also ==
- Pratt & Whitney Wasp series

Related development

- Wright Cyclone series
- Wright R-1300 Cyclone 7
- Wright R-1820 Cyclone 9
- Wright R-2600 Cyclone 14
- Wright R-4090 Cyclone 22

Comparable engines

- BMW 802
- Bristol Centaurus
- Dobrynin VD-4K
- Gnome-Rhône 18L
- Mitsubishi Ha-42 Ha-104 and Ha-214 or MK10
- Pratt & Whitney R-4360 Wasp Major
- Shvetsov ASh-73

Related lists

- List of aircraft engines
