= I.Ae. 24 Calquin =

Argentine fighter-bomber aircraft, 1943–1950

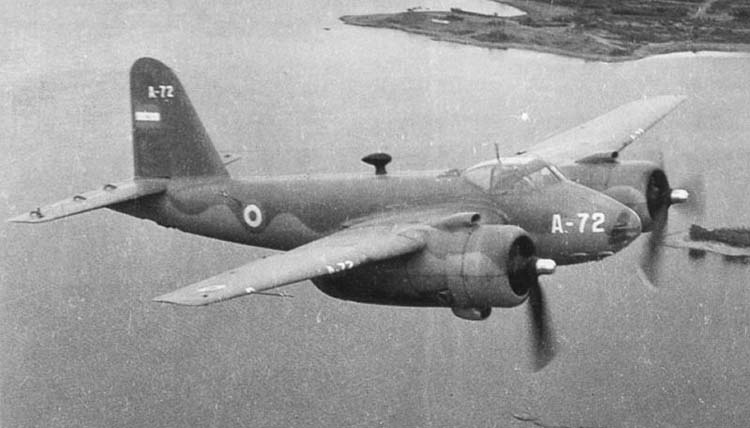
- I.Ae.24 Calquin in squadron use, c.1950 (Note: A-72 was the last surviving Calquin, used as an instructional airframe it survived into the 1960s, it was prepared for museum display but was destroyed around 1966)

General information
- Type: Light Bomber/Heavy Fighter
- Manufacturer: Fabrica Militar de Aviones (FMA)
- Designer: Juan San Martin
- Primary user: Fuerza Aérea Argentina
- Number built: 101

History
- Manufactured: 1943–1950
- First flight: 4 July 1943
- Retired: 1960

The I.Ae.24 Calquin (a Mapudungun word which means "Royal Eagle") was a tactical bomber designed and built by the Instituto Aerotécnico at Córdoba, in Argentina in the immediate post-World War II era. Although superficially a "look-alike" for the de Havilland Mosquito, the I.Ae.24 was powered by twin Pratt & Whitney R-1830-G "Twin Wasp" radials giving it a distinct appearance. After an operational career spanning two decades, the Calquin was retired.

== Design and development ==
Patterned after the successful de Havilland Mosquito, the Calquín had a wooden structure similar to the FMA AeMB.2, and was the first twin-engined aircraft designed and built in Argentina. The I.Ae.24 design was based on a cantilever mid-mounted wooden (indigenous woods were used throughout) wings with fabric-covered flying surfaces. The conventional main twin-oleo undercarriage retracted into the engine nacelles while the tailwheel retracted into the aft fuselage. The two-man crew were seated side by side under a large transparency constructed partly of acrylic glass with glass panels. The armament consisted of four 12.7 mm machine guns grouped in the nose. Some examples later had four 20 mm cannons and an internal bombload of 1,764 lb (800 kg) kg along with 12 rockets (75 mm) mounted under the wings.

Originally the I.Ae. 24 was also intended to be equipped with Rolls-Royce Merlins but an adequate supply of the powerplants was not possible, consequently Pratt & Whitney R-1830-G "Twin Wasp" radials of 1,050 hp (782.5 kW) were substituted. Performance estimates of a Merlin-powered variant would have made it comparable to the Mosquito but the R-1830-powered prototype was able to achieve only 273 mph (440 km/h), making the aircraft unstable and prone to stalling. A later prototype, the I.Ae.28 was equipped with Rolls-Royce Merlins but the project was superseded by the more capable I.Ae. 30 "Ñancú".

== Operational history ==
Despite the lower performance obtained in testing, the I.Ae.24 Calquin was able to undertake an attack and light bombing role, replacing the Northrop A-17 in the Argentine Air Force inventory. A total of 100 aircraft were ordered, with the first production example flying on 4 July 1946. Fifty pilots and crew members were killed in accidents related to Calquín operational service and trials. Test pilots considered the aircraft unstable "on all three axes" and required careful handling. Series production was completed by 1950, with operational service continuing until 1957 although a small number of aircraft were still in squadron use until 1960.

== Operators ==
Argentina

- Argentine Air Force

== Variants ==
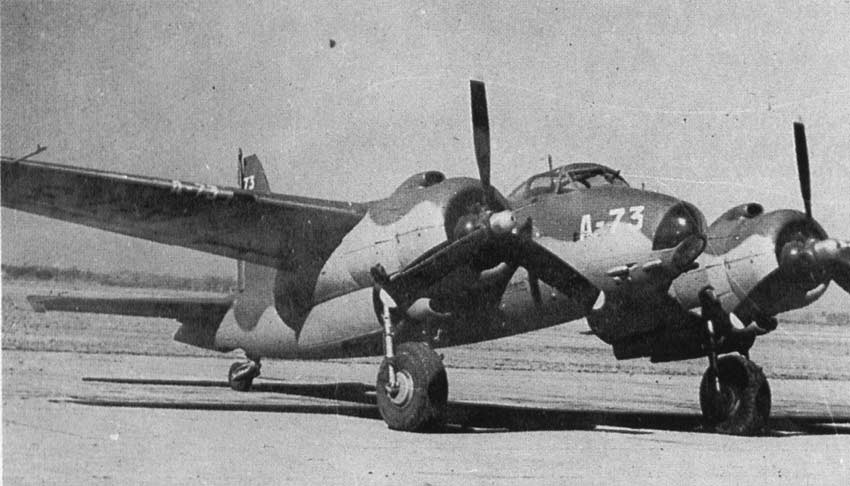
I.Ae.24 "Calquin"

I.Ae.24 "Calquín" "early"
had 4 × 12.7 mm browning ML or DL nationally manufactured heavy machine guns along with bomb ordnance.

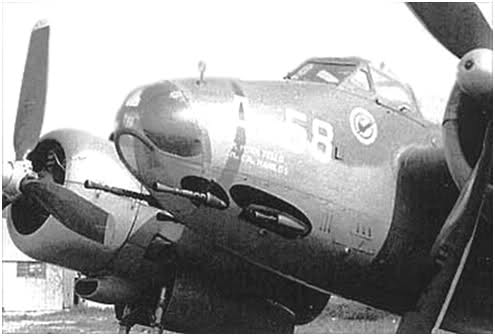
I.Ae.24 Late

I.Ae.24 "Calquín" "late"
had 4 × 20 mm Hispano-Suiza 804 automatic cannons along with bomb and rocket ordnance.

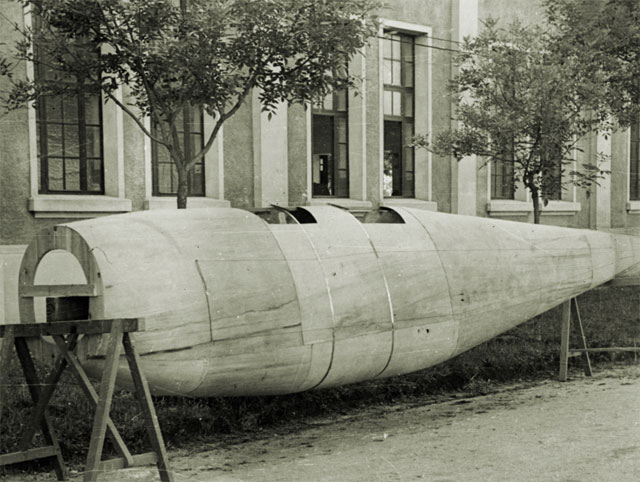
I.Ae. 28 Super Calquín fuselage

I.Ae.28 "Super Calquín"
Evolved variant of the Calquin with Merlin engines and a look similar to the de Havilland "Mosquito", had a gunner and 4–6 × 20 mm cannons. Only a wooden mockup built. Led to the development of the I.Ae. 30 Ñancú.

== Specifications (I.Ae.24 "Calquín") ==
Data from Jane's all the World's Aircraft 1947, Jane's Encyclopedia of Aviation

General characteristics

- Crew: two: pilot, bombardier/navigator
- Length: 12 m (39 ft 4 in)
- Wingspan: 16.3 m (53 ft 6 in)
- Height: 3.4 m (11 ft 2 in)
- Gross weight: 6,500 kg (14,330 lb)
- Max takeoff weight: 7,200 kg (15,873 lb)
- Powerplant: 2 × Pratt & Whitney R-1830-SC-G Twin Wasp 14-cylinder air-cooled radial piston engines, 780 kW (1,050 hp) each
- Propellers: 3-bladed Hamilton Standard Hydromatic 23-E-50

Performance

- Maximum speed: 480 km/h (300 mph, 260 kn)
- Range: 1,040 km (650 mi, 560 nmi)
- Service ceiling: 10,900 m (35,800 ft)
- Wing loading: 170.9 kg/m^{2} (35.0 lb/sq ft)
- Power/mass: 4.13 kg/kW (6.8 lb/hp)

Armament

- Guns:

- 4 × 12.7 mm browning ML or DL heavy machine guns nationally manufactured on the early variant

or

- 4 × 20 mm Hispano-Suiza 804 cannon with 300 rounds per gun on the later variant

- Rockets: 12 × 75 mm 60 lb (27 kg) rockets (Mk VI) on the later variant
- Bombs: 800 kg (1,800 lb) bombs on both early and late variant

== See also ==
Comparable aircraft

- de Havilland Mosquito
