= I.Ae.32 Chingolo =

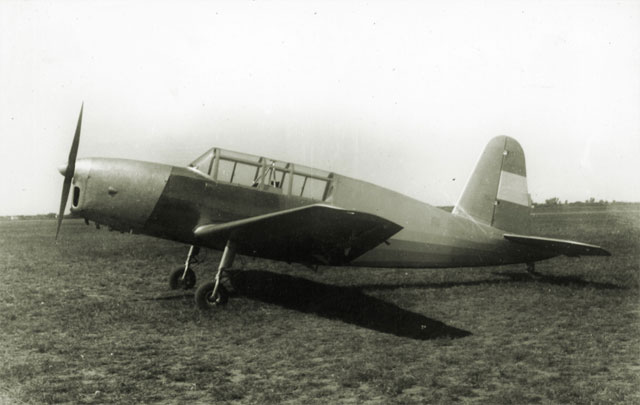

General information
- Type: Advanced trainer
- National origin: Argentina
- Manufacturer: Instituto Aerotécnico
- Designer: Ernesto Vicente
- Number built: 1

History
- First flight: 1949

The I.Ae.32 Chingolo (named after the South American bird) was a civil trainer, touring and aerobatic aircraft developed in Argentina in the 1940s. It was designed by Sandro Gorissenso and developed by the Instituto Aerotécnico for manufacture by the company “Mario Vicente Construcciones Aeronáuticas” in Córdoba Province as an initiative under President Juan Perón's first five year plan.

== Design and development ==
The design, which shared some of the technical characteristics of the earlier I.Ae. 31 Colibrí, was a conventional low-wing cantilever monoplane with and had fixed tailwheel undercarriage; seating a student pilot (or passenger) and instructor (or pilot) in a tandem enclosed cockpit. Only one prototype was built.

== Specifications ==
General characteristics

- Crew: two, student pilot and instructor
- Length: 8.12 m (26 ft 8 in)
- Wingspan: 10.70 m (35 ft 1 in)
- Height: 2.10 m (6 ft 11 in)
- Wing area: 16.50 m^{2} (177.6 sq ft)
- Empty weight: 750 kg (1,653 lb)
- Gross weight: 981 kg (2,163 lb)
- Powerplant: 1 × Blackburn Cirrus Major 3 , 115 kW (155 hp)

Performance

- Maximum speed: 230 km/h (143 mph, 124 kn)
- Endurance: 1 hours 50 minutes
- Service ceiling: 5,180 m (16,990 ft)

== See also ==
- I.Ae. 31 Colibrí
