= Fábrica Argentina de Aviones =

Argentine state-owned aircraft manufacturer

Coordinates: 31°26′35.6″S 64°16′20.9″W

Fábrica Argentina de Aviones "Brigadier San Martín" S.A.

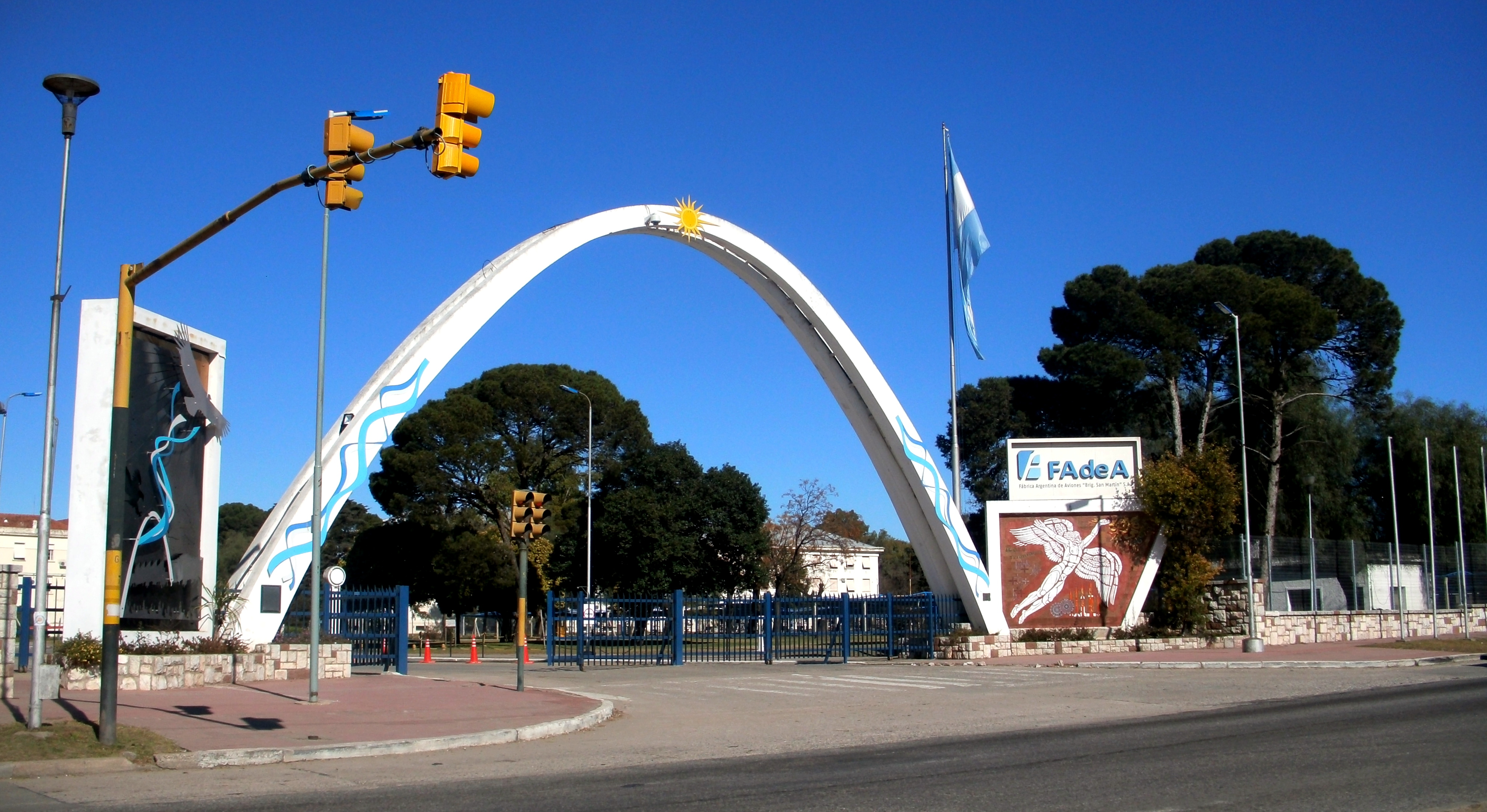
- Formerly: Instituto Aerotécnico (1927–1943); Fábrica Militar de Aviones (1943–1995); Lockheed Martin Aircraft Argentina SA (1995-2009)
- Company type: Sociedad Anónima
- Industry: Aerospace, Defense
- Founded: 1927; 99 years ago
- Founder: Francisco de Arteaga
- Headquarters: Córdoba, Argentina
- Key people: Fernando Sibilla (CEO); Alejandro Solís (VP)
- Products: Aircraft, components, maintenance, services
- Owner: Government of Argentina (2009–present); Lockheed Martin (1995–2009)
- Number of employees: 1,600 (as of June 2014)
- Parent: Ministry of Defense
- Website: fadeasa.com.ar

The Fábrica Argentina de Aviones SA (mostly known for its acronym FAdeA, officially Fábrica Argentina de Aviones "Brigadier San Martín" S.A.), is Argentina's main aircraft manufacturer. Founded on 10 October 1927 and located in Córdoba, for most of its existence it was known as "Fábrica Militar de Aviones" (FMA) until its privatization in the 1990s to Lockheed Martin. In 2009, the concession ended and the company is now wholly owned by the Argentine government.

== History ==
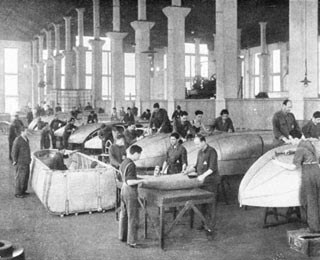
1930s view of the FMA workshop

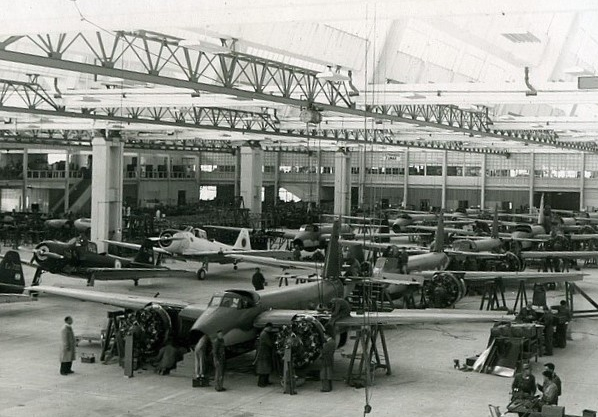
Late 1940s view of the FMA/IAe "Hangar 90" production line: I.Ae.22 DL (back) and I.Ae.24 Calquín (front)

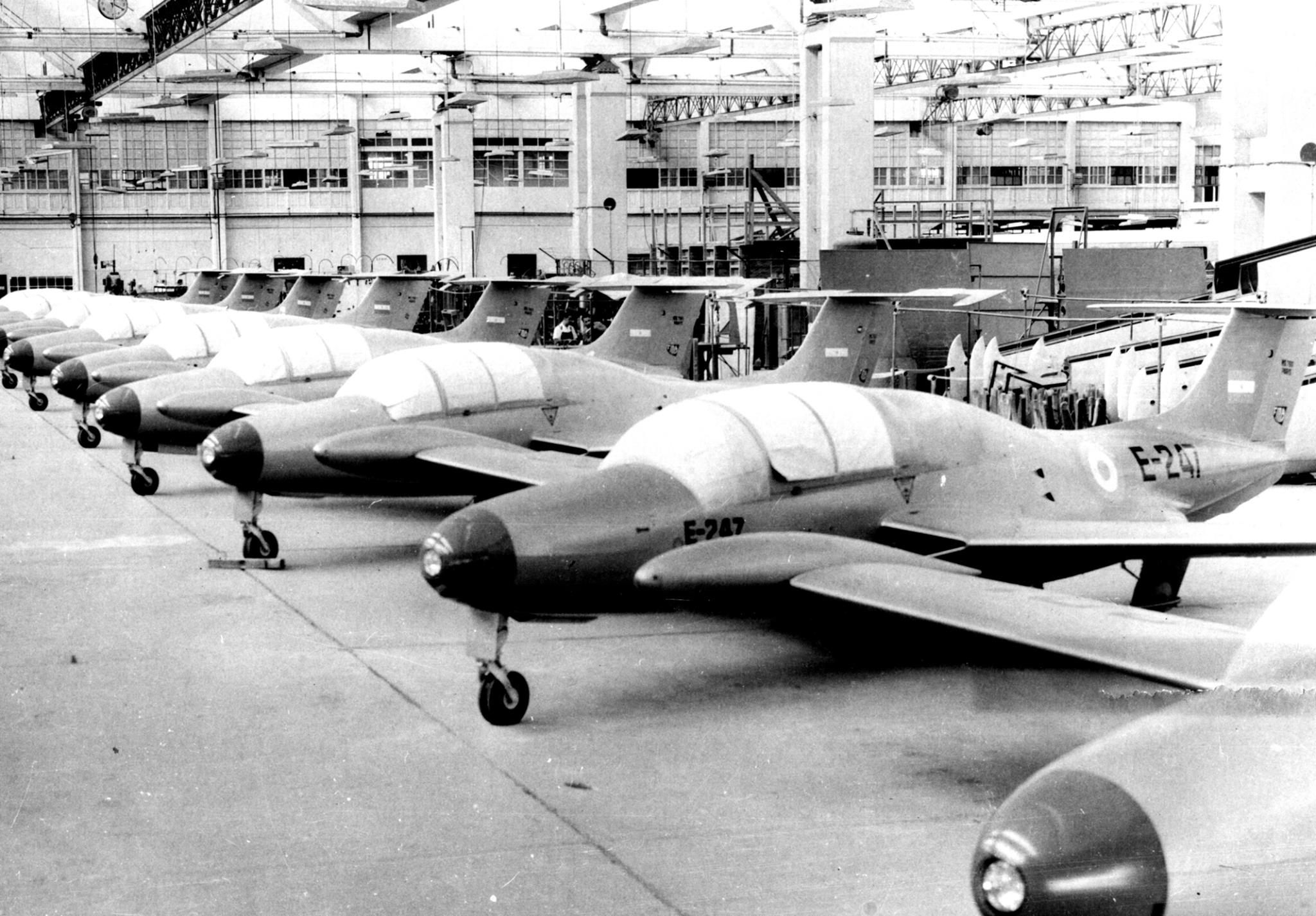
1960s view of the production line: Morane Saulnier 760

Formed on 10 October 1927 and on 18 July 1928 ends the construction and testing begins on the track the first domestically produced aircraft: the license built Avro 504 Gosport training aircraft equipped with a 100 hp (75 kW) Gnome engine. It had a speed of 140 km/h with a flying endurance of 2 hours. A series of indigenous and foreign designs followed, mostly for military use.

The factory is known for producing the first jet fighter aircraft in Latin America: the Pulqui I (1947) and the Pulqui II (1950) under the direction of engineers Emile Dewoitine (French) and Kurt Tank (German) respectively.

In the 1960s, it produced the Guarani light transport and the Pucara COIN aircraft, followed by the Pampa jet trainer in the 1980s; the last two still in service with the Argentine Air Force as of early 2016.

=== Privatization (1995) ===
In 1995, FMA was privatized by the government of Carlos Menem and from that year until March 2009 it operated as a concession to LAASA (Lockheed Aircraft Argentina SA, a subsidiary of Lockheed Martin Corporation). Under the terms of the privatization agreement LAASA would operate it for 25 years, which could be renewed for two 10 year periods.

During this period the activity was mostly focused in maintenance and upgrades of existing aircraft in service with the Argentine Air Force.

=== Nationalization (2010) ===
During the government of Cristina Fernández de Kirchner the factory was nationalized in August 2009, with compensation of ARS $67 million paid. The text of the expropriation law provides that "the State cannot divest itself of majority shareholdings or the power to make decisions at the factory."

It was renamed after Argentine Air Force Brigadier Juan Ignacio San Martín a military engineer who laid the foundations of the aeronautics industry at Córdoba when he directed the Instituto Aerotécnico, the forerunner of the FMA, in the 1940s.

The United States Department of State announced that effective 18 December 2009, Lockheed Martin Aircraft Argentina would be renamed to Fábrica Argentina de Aviones "Brigadier San Martin" S.A. and divested to the Government of Argentina.

== Aircraft design and production ==
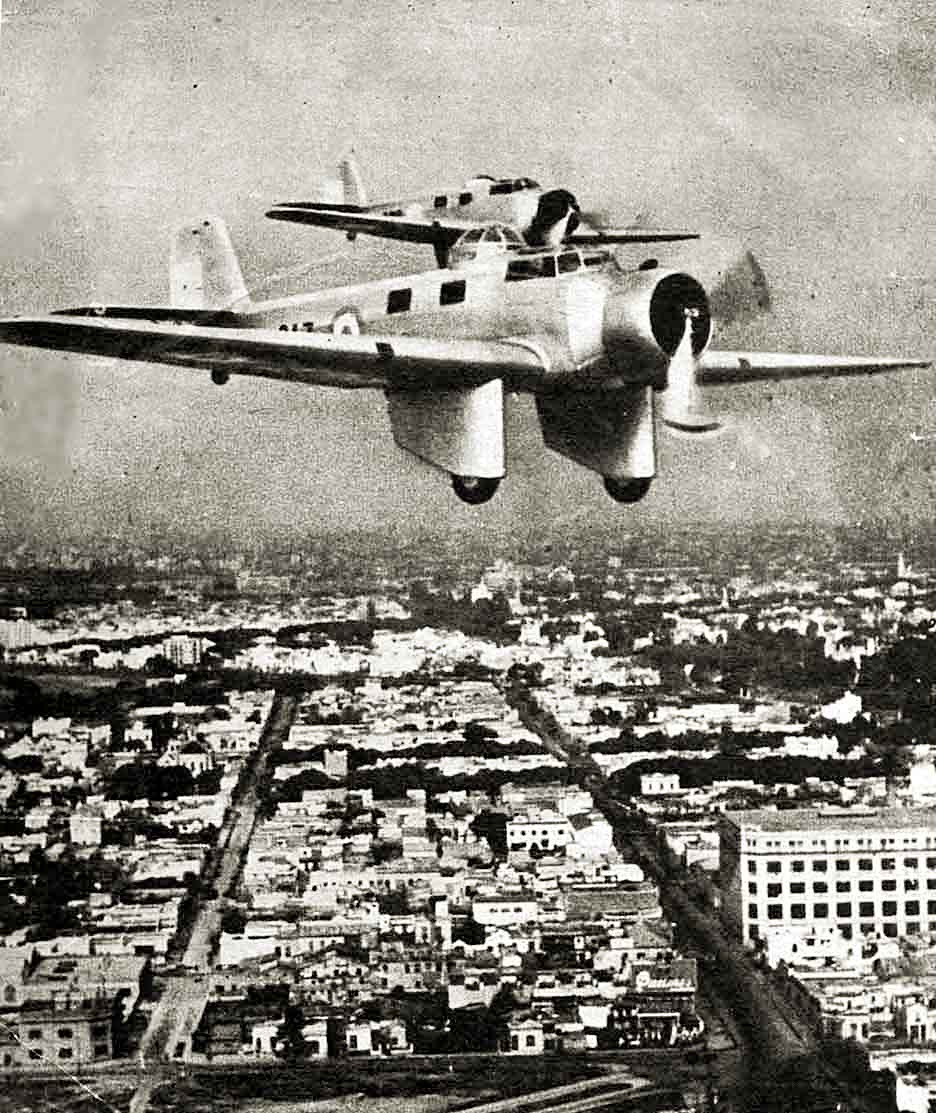
AeMB.2 Bombi bombers in flight

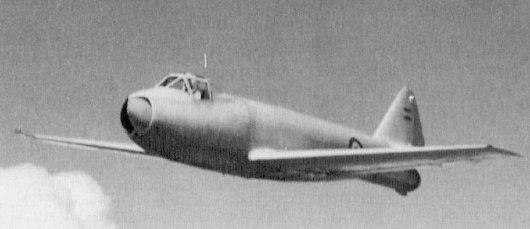
Pulqui I prototype in flight (c.1951)

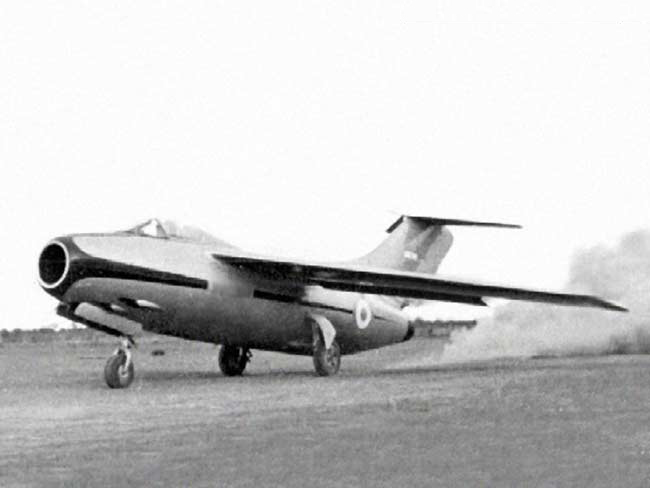
I.Ae. 33 Pulqui II

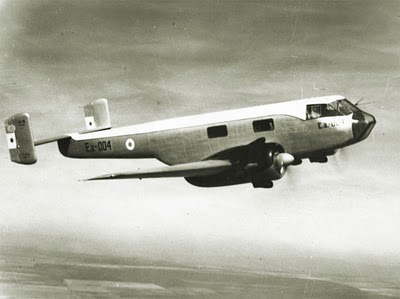
DINFIA IA 35 Huanquero, utility aircraft designed in the early 1950s

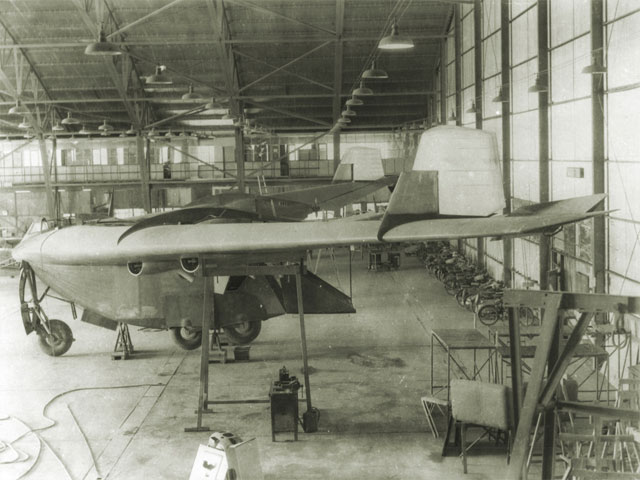
Prototype IA 38 Naranjero under construction, early 1960s

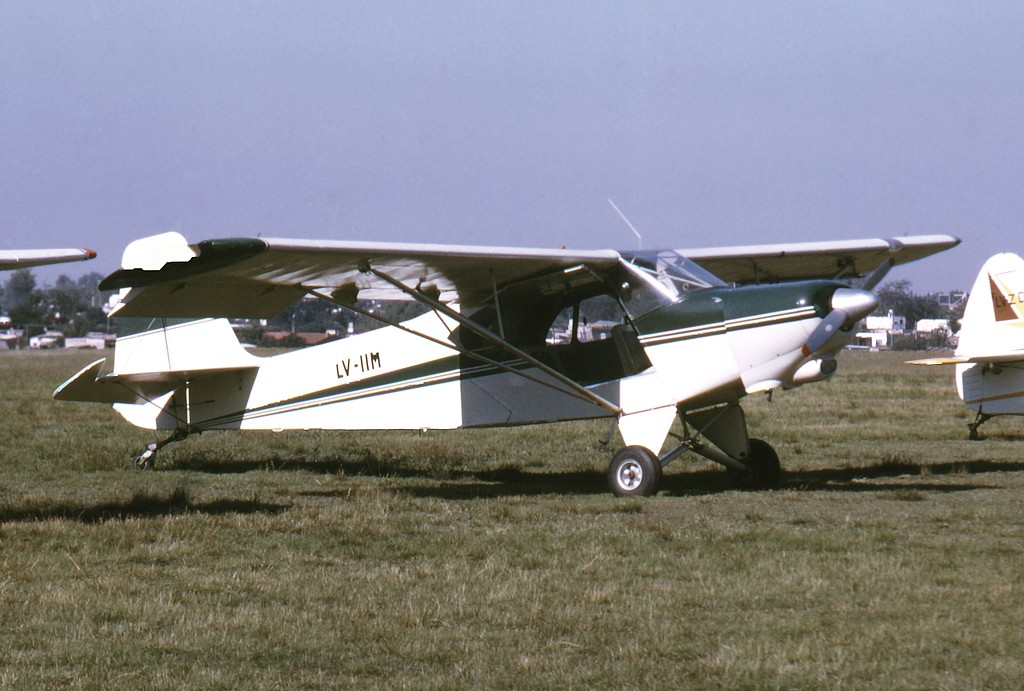
IA 46 ‘’Super Ranquel’’ at San Justo airfield (Buenos Aires), April 1975

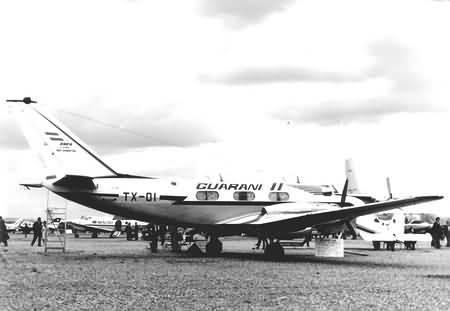
I.A. 50 Guarani II

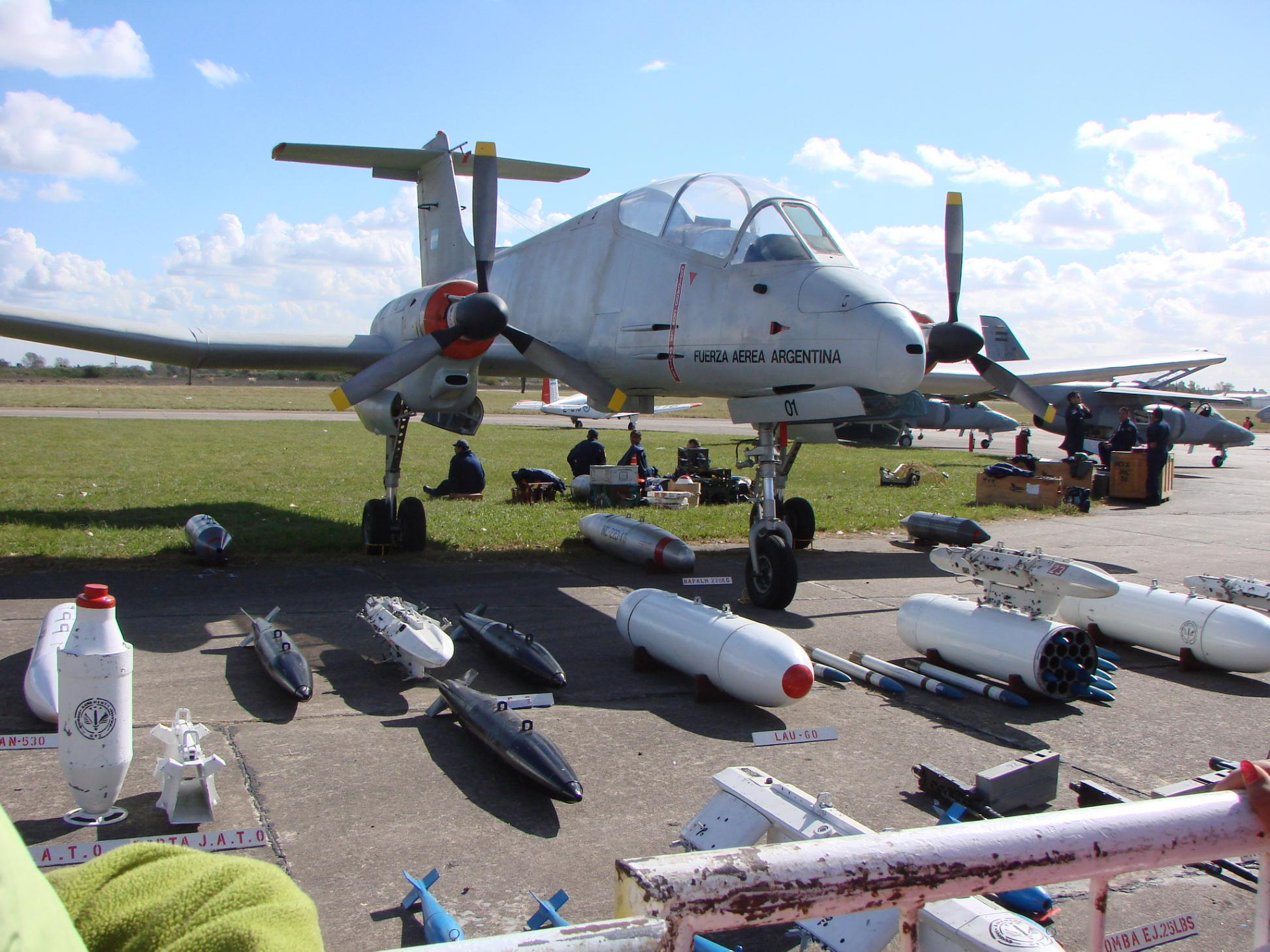
I.A. 58 Pucará

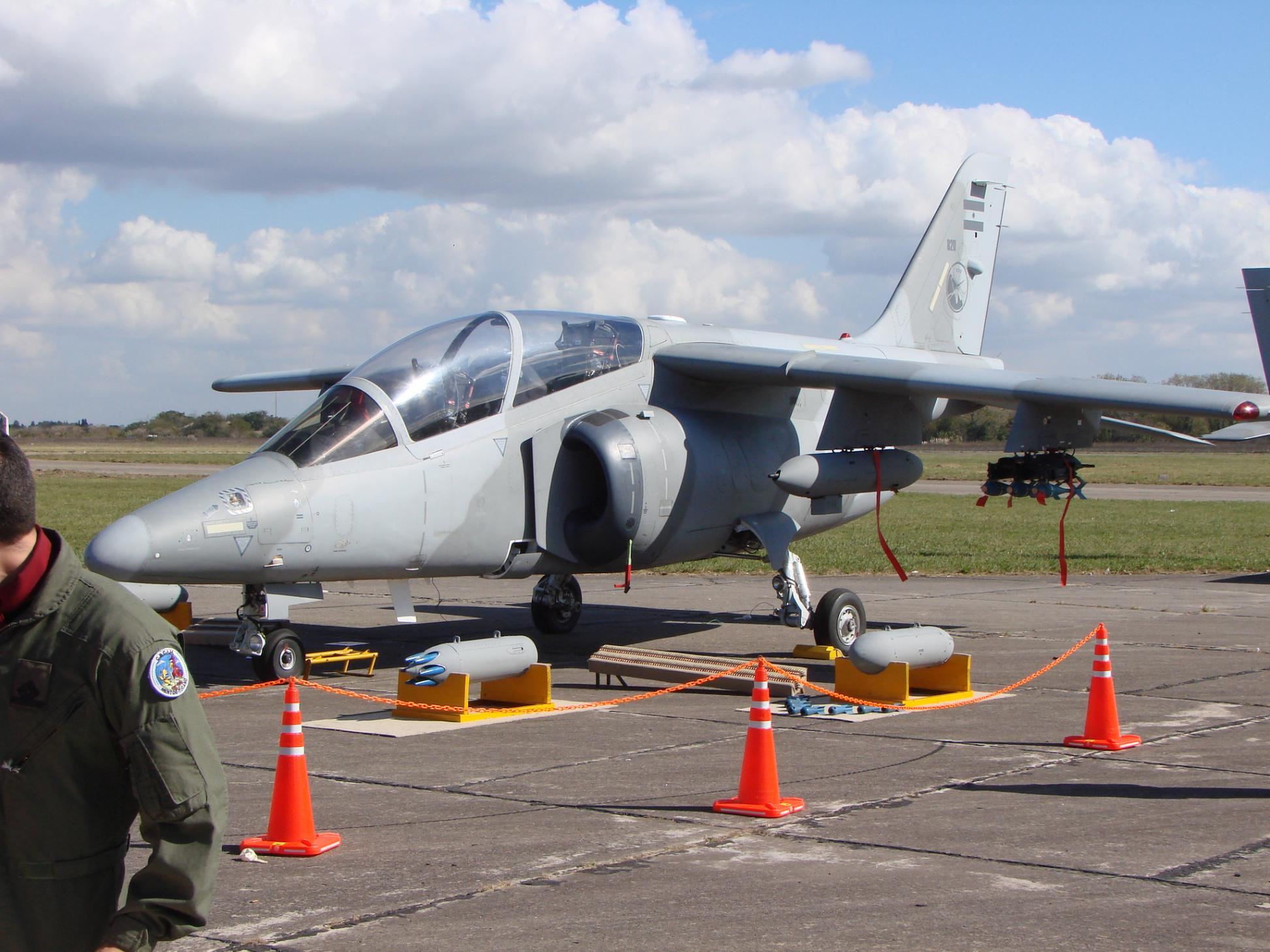
I.A. 63 Pampa II

The FMA has produced innovative aircraft prototypes, but the state of the Argentine economy has usually prevented most of them from entering large-scale production. Nevertheless the FMA has managed to put several aircraft types of more conventional designs into full productions. It also engaged in production of licensed aircraft from other countries.

The prefixes used for the aircraft locally developed (and produced) are:

- Ae, for "Dirección General de Aerotécnica", on the first period (1927–1936);
- F.M.A., for "Fábrica Militar de Aviones", on the second period (1938–1943);
- I.Ae., for "Instituto Aerotécnico", on the third period (1943–1952);
- IA, for "Instituto Aerotécnico", on the current period (1952–present).

=== List of aircraft manufactured, projected, or upgraded ===
Year	Model	Built	Obs
Started as Instituto Aerotécnico
1928	Avro 504K Gosport	31	Biplane basic trainer, license-built. First aircraft produced by FMA.
1930	Dewoitine D.21	35	Monoplane fighter, license-built.
1931	FMA AeC.1	1	Civil tourism aircraft prototype (initial version); basic trainer (later version). First local design.
1932	FMA AeC.2	2	Civil tourism aircraft
1932	FMA AeME.1	7	Basic military trainer
1933	FMA AeT.1	3	Transport/commercial aircraft
1934	FMA AeMO.1	41	Observation monoplane
1934	FMA AeMOe.1	6	Derivative of the AeMO.1, observation and training aircraft
1934	FMA AeMOe.2	61	Variant of the AeMOe.1, observation and training aircraft
1934	FMA AeC.3	16	Civil aircraft.
1935	FMA AeMB.1	1	First bomber built by FMA.
1935	FMA AeMB.2	14	Bomber.
1935	FMA AeMS.1	1	Ambulance aircraft
1936	FMA AeC.3G	1	Tourism aircraft.
1936	FMA AeC.4	1	Improved prototype version of the C.3G
Name changed to Fábrica Militar de Aviones
1940	Curtiss Hawk 75O	20	License built version of the US monoplane fighter Curtiss Hawk 75
1940	Focke-Wulf Fw 44J Stieglitz	190	License built version of the German biplane trainer
1940	FMA I.Ae.20 El Boyero	130	Tourism aircraft, series built by Industrias Petrolini
1943	FMA I.Ae.21	1	Advanced trainer aircraft prototype, based on the North American NA-16-1P fuselage.
1943	FMA I.Ae.22 DL	206	Advanced trainer aircraft
1943	FMA I.Ae.23	1	Basic trainer prototype, based on the Focke-Wulf Fw44J
1943	FMA I.Ae.24 Calquín	100	Attack/Light bomber
1945	FMA I.Ae.25 Mañque	1	Assault/Transport glider.
1947	FMA I.Ae.27 Pulqui	1	Jet fighter prototype, first of its kind built in Latin America.
1947	FMA I.Ae.28 Super Calquín	0	Merlin-powered development of Calquin, abandoned in favour of I.Ae. 30 Ñancú.
1948	FMA I.Ae.30 Ñancú	1	Fighter/Attack prototype
1947	FMA I.Ae.31 Colibrí	3	Two-seat Trainer aircraft
1949	FMA I.Ae.32 Chingolo	1	Tourism/Trainer aircraft
1950	FMA I.Ae.33 Pulqui II	5	First swept-wing jet fighter designed in Latin America
1949	FMA I.Ae.34 Clen Antú	7	Flying wing sailplane designed by Reimar Horten, also known as the Horten XVa and XVb
1953	FMA I.Ae.35 Huanquero/Constancia/Pandora	36	Twin engine transport aircraft.
1960	FMA I.Ae.35 Guaraní I	1	Approximate date, transport derived from the I.Ae. 35 Huanquero
1951	FMA I.Ae.36 Cóndor	0	Cancelled Kurt Tank civil passenger transport project.
1954	FMA I.Ae.37	1	Supersonic delta-wing interceptor, Unpowered glider prototype only.
1960	FMA I.Ae.38 Naranjero	1	Prototype flying-wing cargo transport.
mid-1950s	FMA I.Ae.39	0	Cancelled transport project based on the I.Ae.35.
1956	FMA I.Ae.40	0	Cancelled night fighter project.
1953	FMA I.Ae.41 Urubú	4	Flying-wing glider, designed by Reimar Horten, also known as the Horten XVc.
1953	FMA I.Ae.43 Pulqui III	0	Cancelled swept-wing supersonic jet fighter project
1953	FMA IAe.44 DL.II	0	Cancelled advanced trainer project
1959	FMA I.Ae.45 Querandí	2	Executive transport prototype (Some sources give 1957 and 1 built)
1957	FMA I.Ae.46 Ranquel	217	2-seat utility aircraft. Second series, developed into Super Ranquel.
1960	FMA I.Ae.48	0	Cancelled supersonic delta-wing all-weather interceptor
1963	DINFIA IA 50 Guaraní II	35	Transport derived from IA 35 Guaraní I
	Beechcraft T-34 Mentor	75	Licence-built trainer.
1965	IA 53 Mamboretá	2	Agricultural aircraft
1963	IA 54 Carancho	1	Prototype laminar flow glider
1960	Morane-Saulnier MS.760 Paris	48	Licence-built trainer.
1967	FMA IA 58 Pucará	120	Counter-insurgency/light attack aircraft
1985	FMA IA 58C Pucará "Charlie"	1	Single seater with 30 mm (1.2 in) DEFA cannon, air-to-surface missiles. Cancelled after prototype flown.
1972	FMA IA 59	1	UAV prototype
1975	FMA IA 60	0	Cancelled advanced trainer/light attack project
1978	FMA IA 62	0	Cancelled military trainer project
1984	FMA IA-63 Pampa	32	Advanced trainer. AT-63 currently under production.
1980	FMA IA 66 Pucará II	1	Single prototype; converted IA-58A powered by two 1,000-ehp (746-kW) Garrett TPE331-11-601W turboprop engines.
(mid-1980s)	IA 67 Córdoba	0	Cancelled light transport project
(mid-1980s)	IA 68 ATL	0	Cancelled light transport project
(mid-1980s)	FMA SAIA 90	0	Cancelled Supersonic air superiority jet fighter project
1990	FMA IA 70; Embraer/FMA CBA 123 Vector	2	Cancelled 19-passenger turboprop airliner
Name changed to Lockheed Martin Aircraft Argentina SA
1999	Lockheed Martin A-4AR Fightinghawk	18	Another 18 by Lockheed Martin in Pasadena, California, US.
2003	Beechcraft T-34 Mentor		Refurbishment of Argentine and Bolivia Air Forces
2006	Lockheed C-130 Hercules		Refurbishment of Argentine Air Force and Colombian Air Force aircraft.
Name changed to FAdeA S.A.
2009	FMA IA 63 Pampa II-40		Changing power plant
2010	FMA IA 58 Pucará	1	Changing power plant and avionics (cancelled)
2010	FAdeA IA 73		Basic trainer to replace the T-34 (cancelled)
2014	FAdeA IA 100	1	Elemental trainer and a project to demonstrate the capabilities of the Argentine industry
2018	IA 63 Pampa III Block I	6	Third evolution of the Pampa aircraft, with 3 more in order for 2019 for the Argentine Air Force.

== Gallery ==
=== Local designs ===
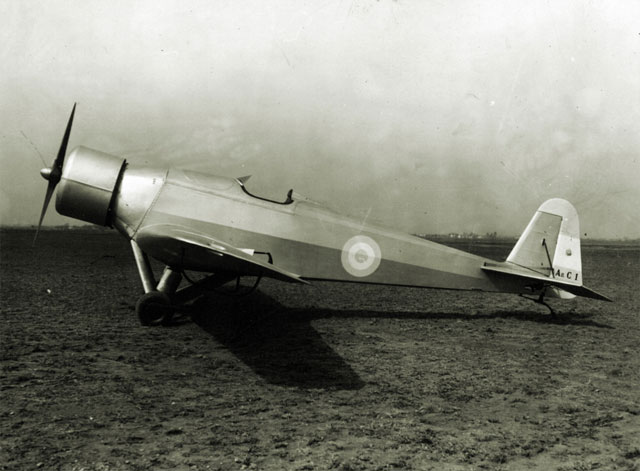
Prototype AeC.1 (1931)

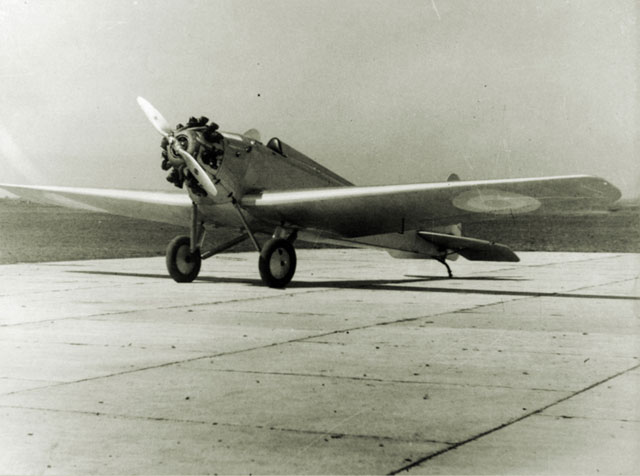
AeC.2 (1932)

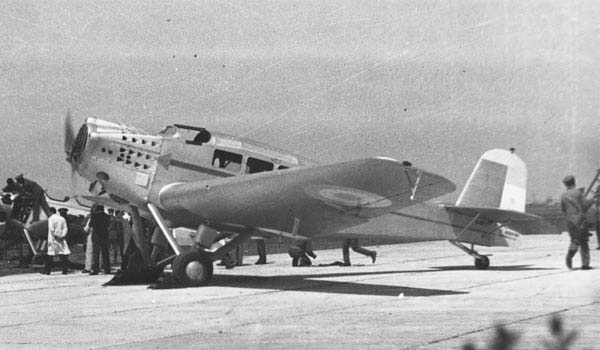
AeT.1 (1933)

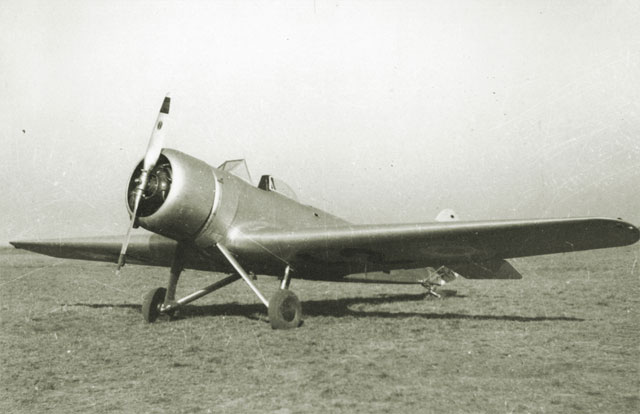
AeMOe.1

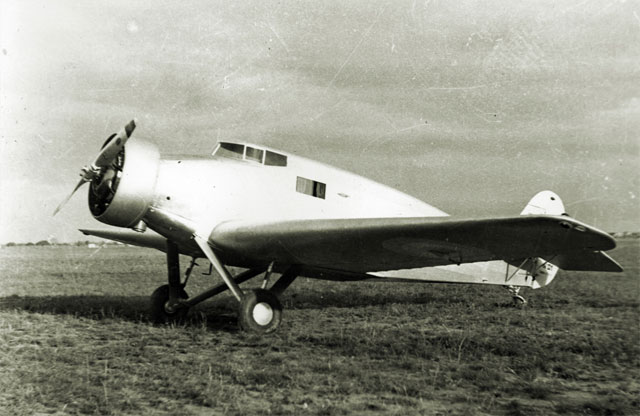
AeMS.1 prototype

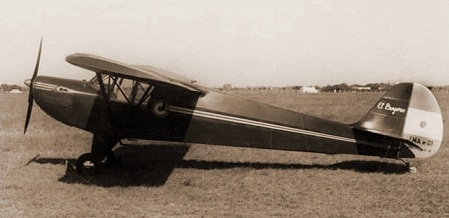
FMA 20 El Boyero (1940)

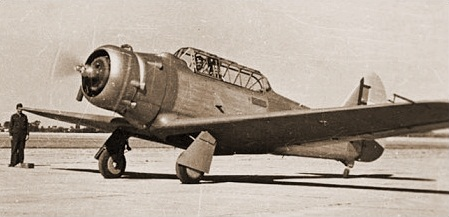
Prototype FMA 21 trainer (1943)

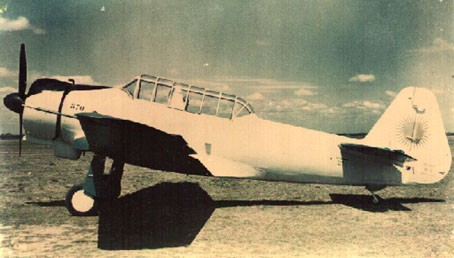
I.Ae. 22 DL advanced trainer (1944)

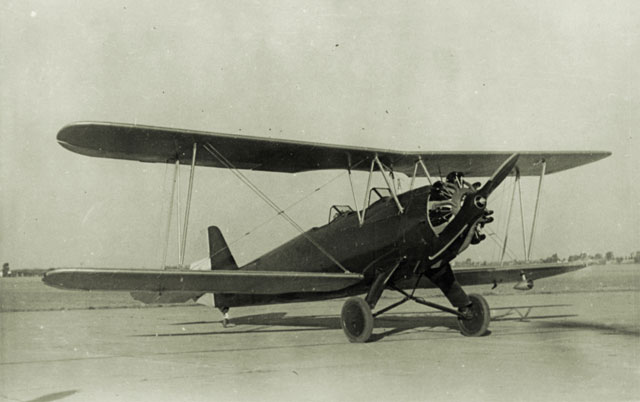
I.Ae. 23 trainer prototype, based on the FW-44J Stieglitz (1944)

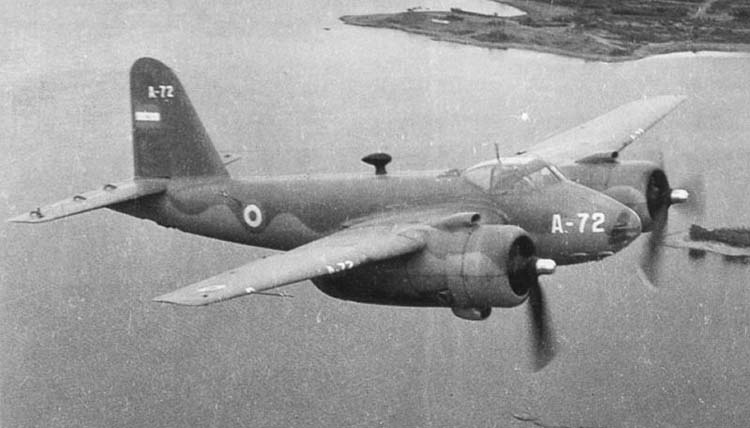
I.Ae. 24 Calquin attack aircraft, c.1950

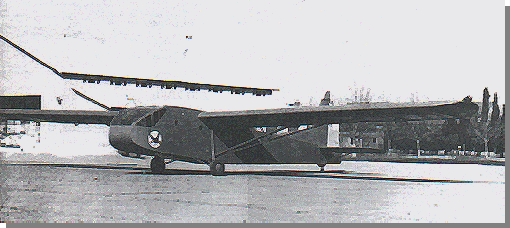
Prototype I.Ae. 25 Mañque glider (1945)

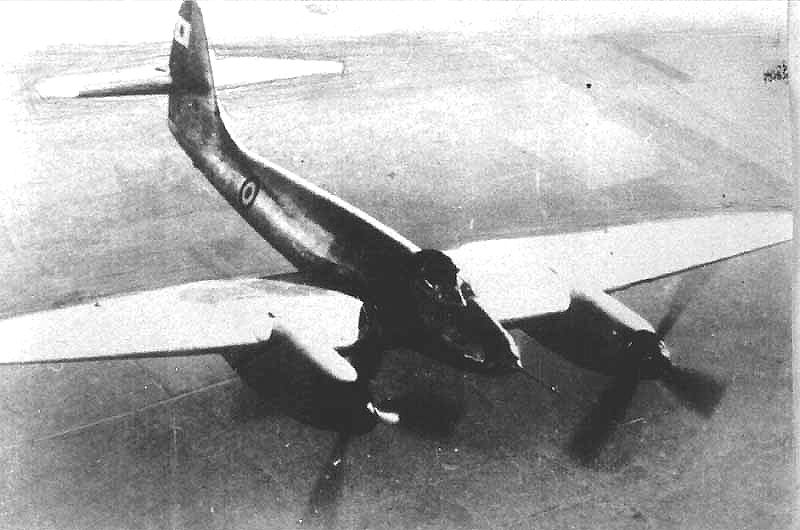
I.Ae. 30 Ñancú (1948)

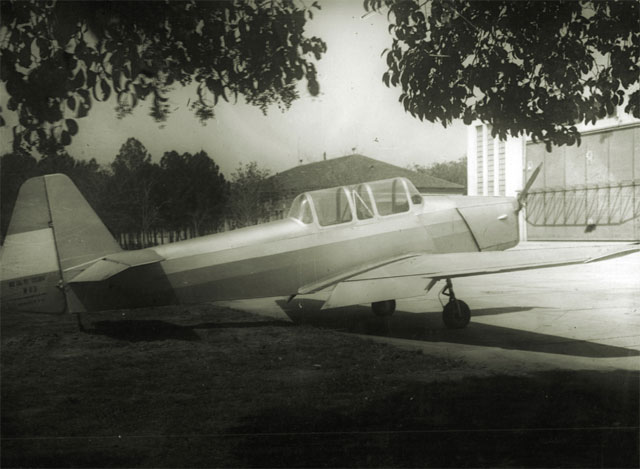
IAe.31 Colibrí (1947)

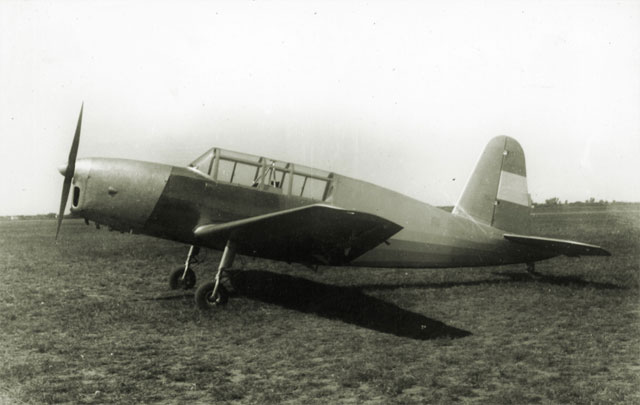
I.Ae.32 Chingolo (1949)

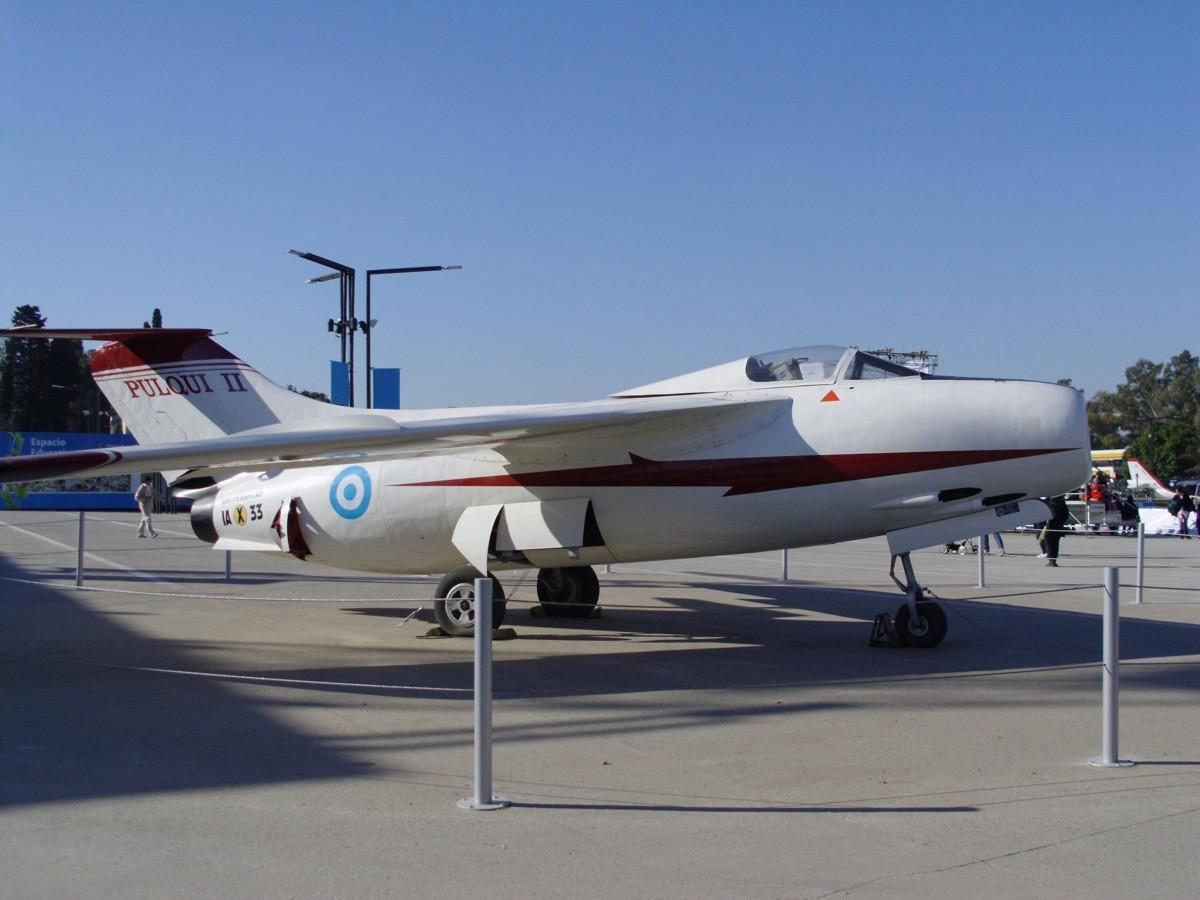
I.Ae.33 Pulqui II prototype 5 (1959), preserved, Tecnópolis show, 2012

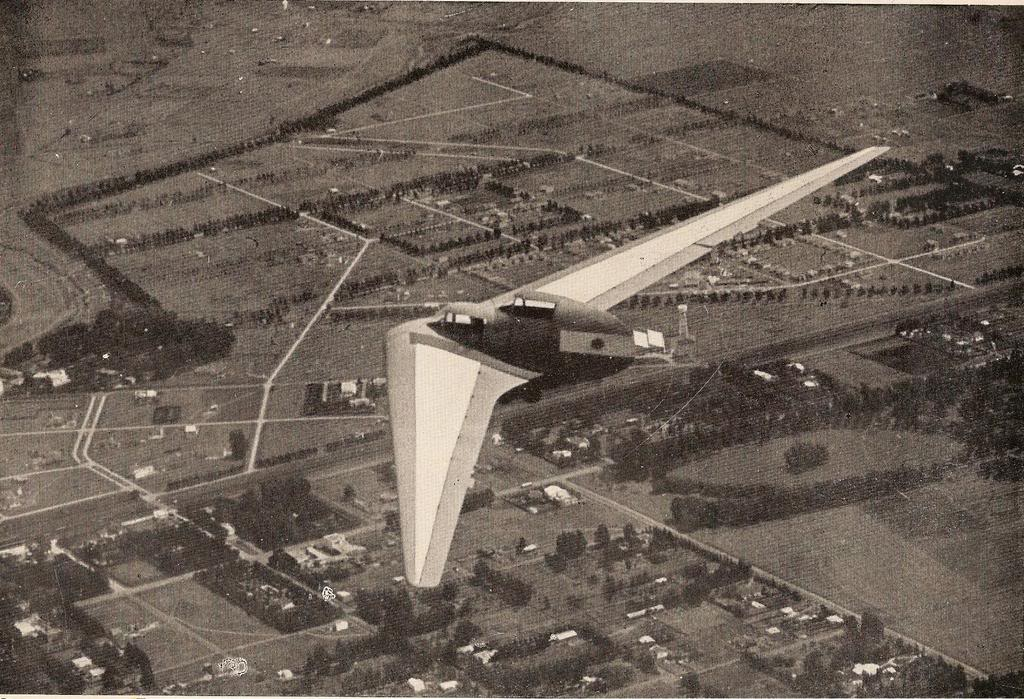
I.Ae. 34 Clen Antú, tailless glider designed by Reimar Horten, late 1940s

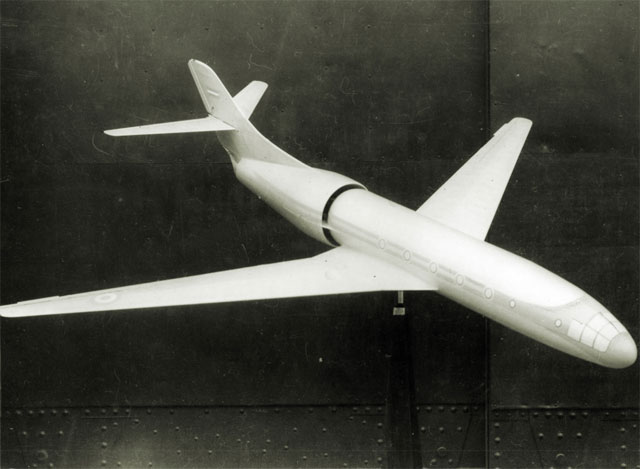
Model I.A. 36 Cóndor, airliner designed by Kurt Tank, early 1950s

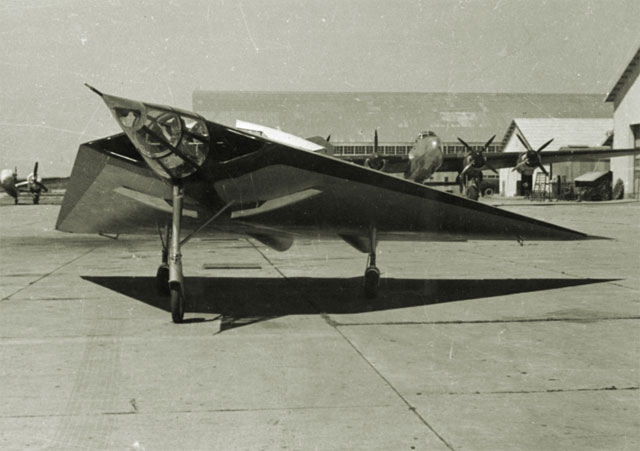
FMA I.Ae. 37 fighter prototype (1953)

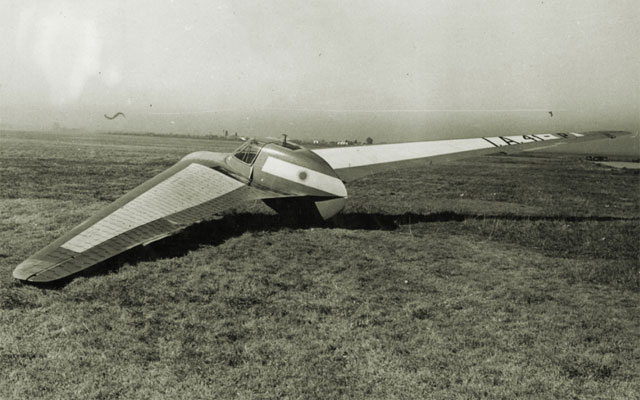
IAe.41 Urubú flying wing glider (1953)

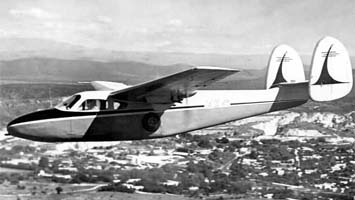
IA 45 Querandi light transport prototype (1957)

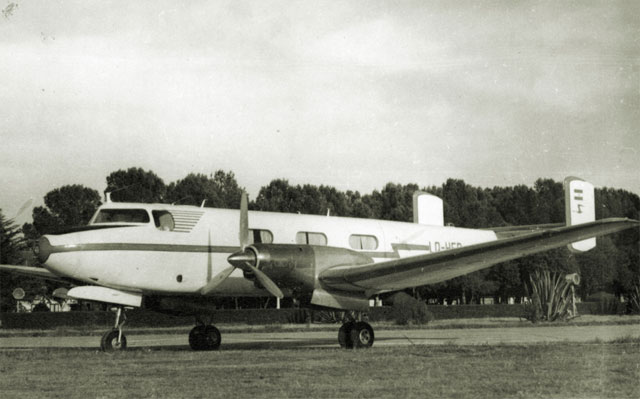
IA 50 Guaraní I (1962)

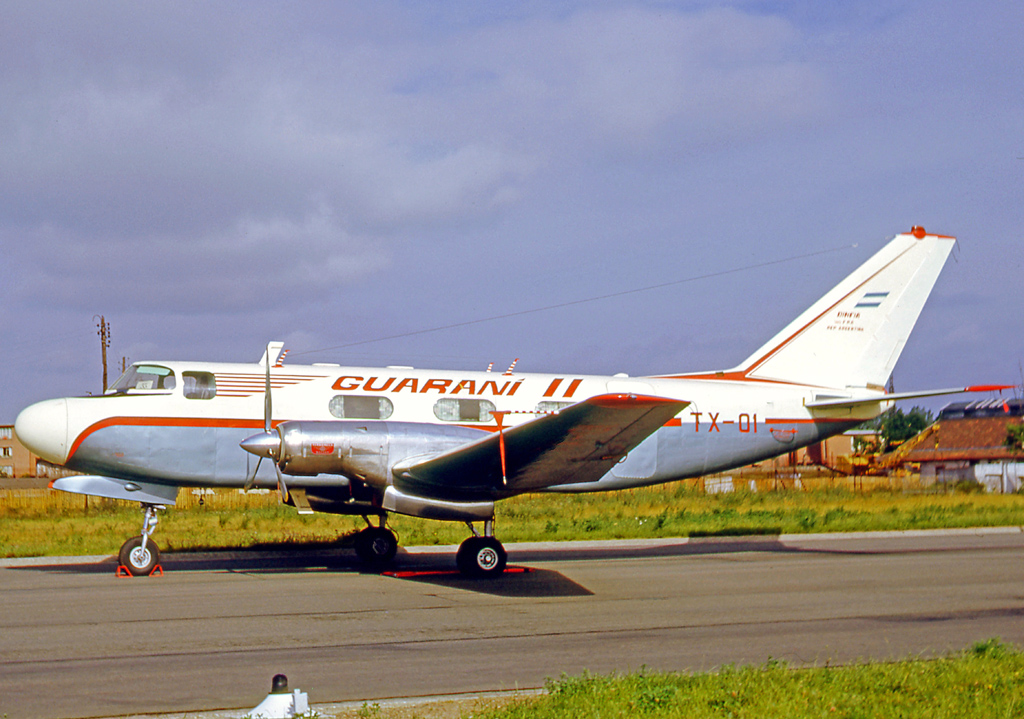
Prototype Guarani II, 1965 Paris Air Salon

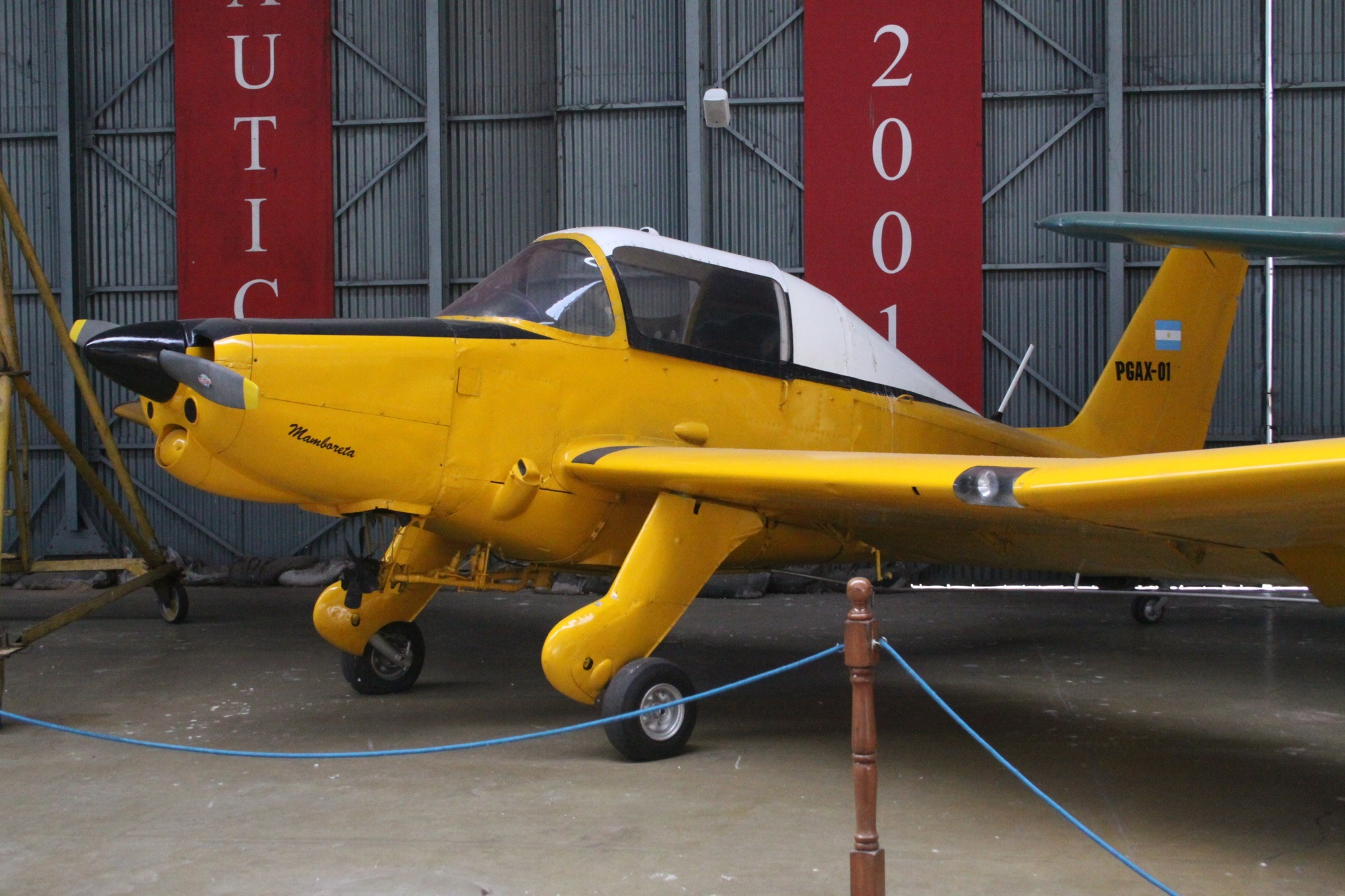
IA 53 Mamboretá agricultural aircraft prototype (mid-1960s)

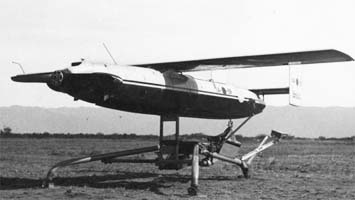
IA-59, prototype Unmanned aerial vehicle, early 1970s

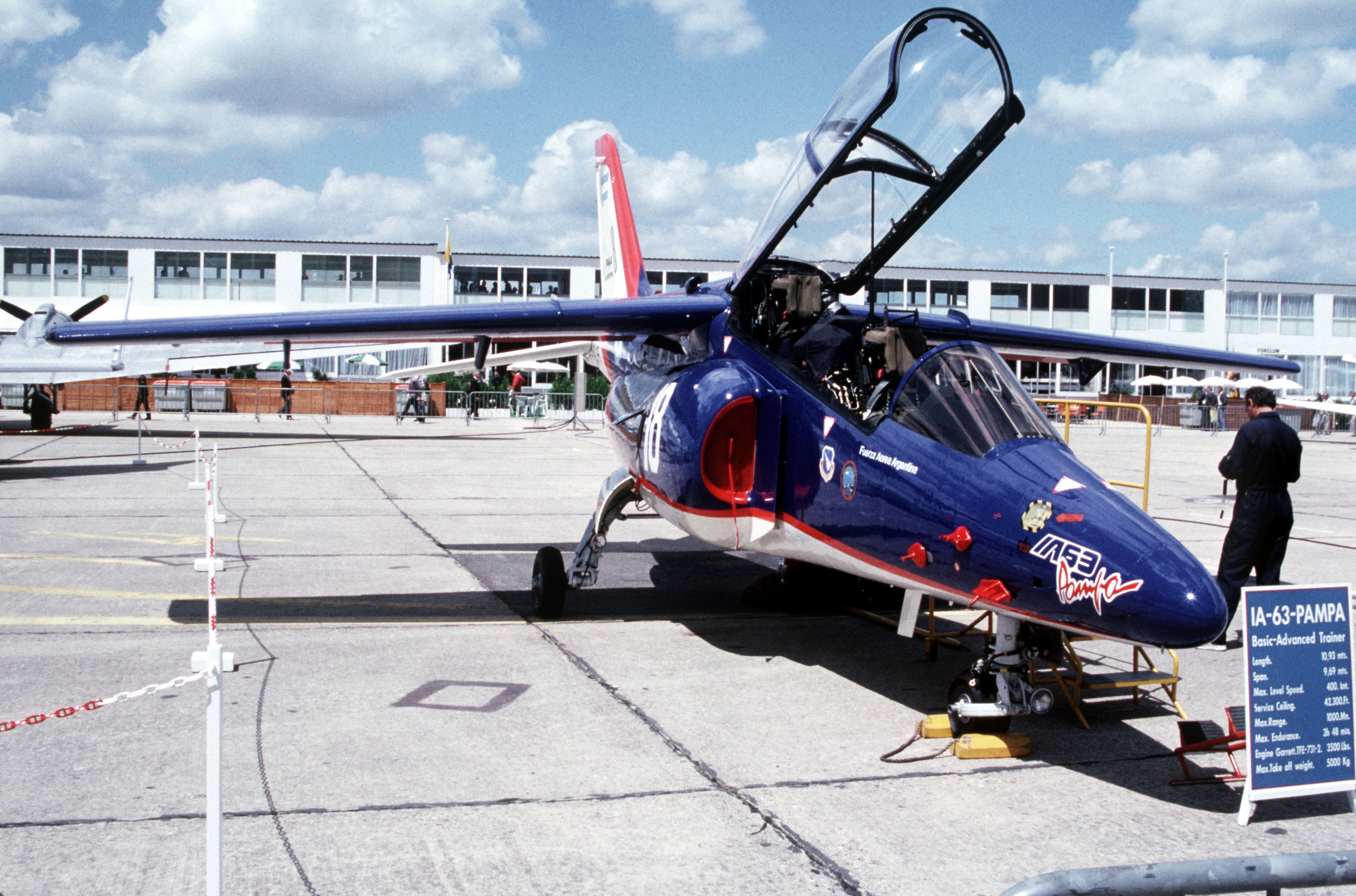
FMA IA 63 Pampa, Paris Air Show, 1991

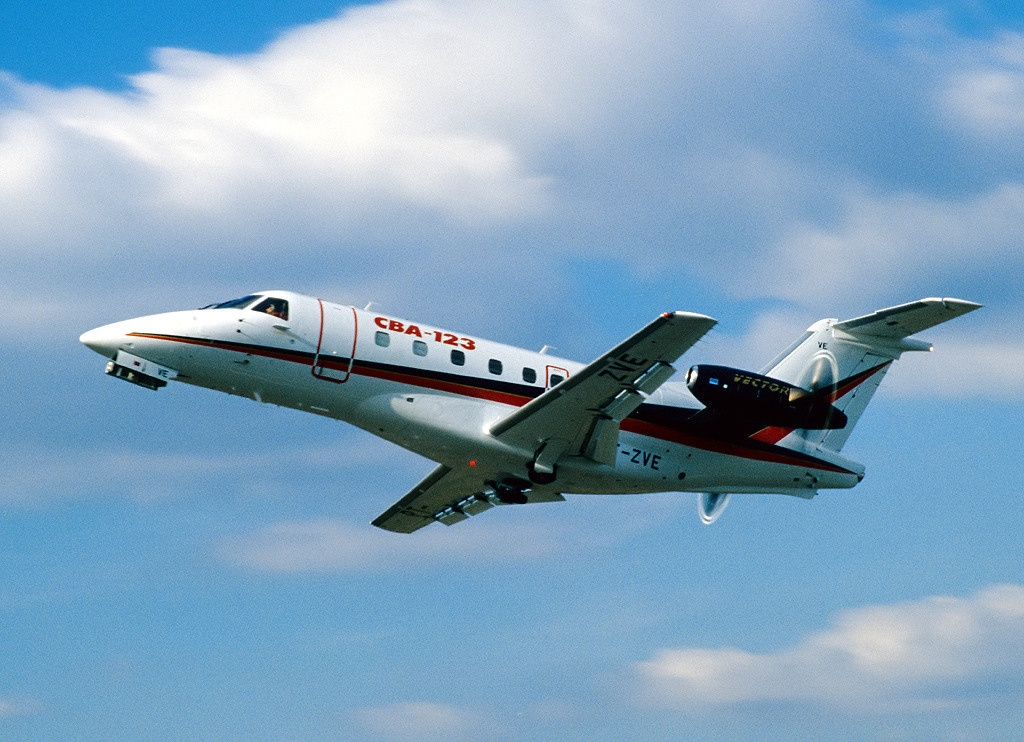
CBA 123 / IA 70 prototype, Farnborough 1990

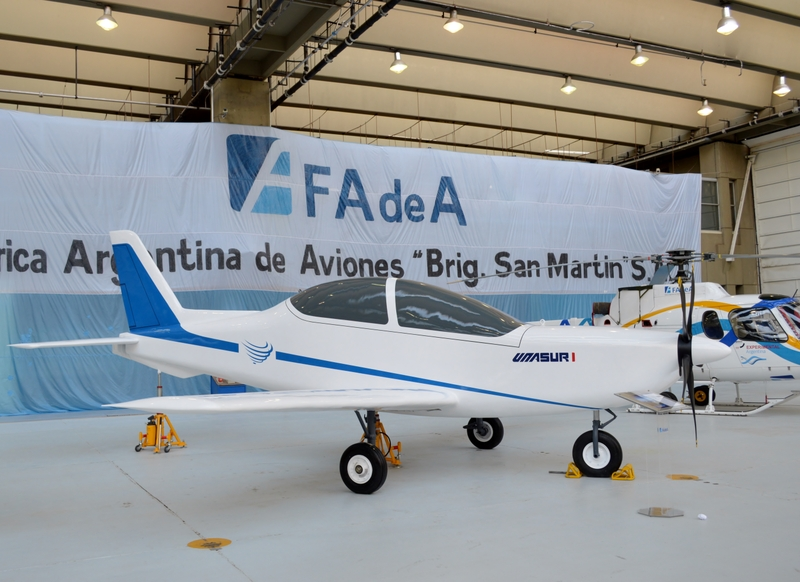
FAdeA I.A. 73 Unasur I mock-up

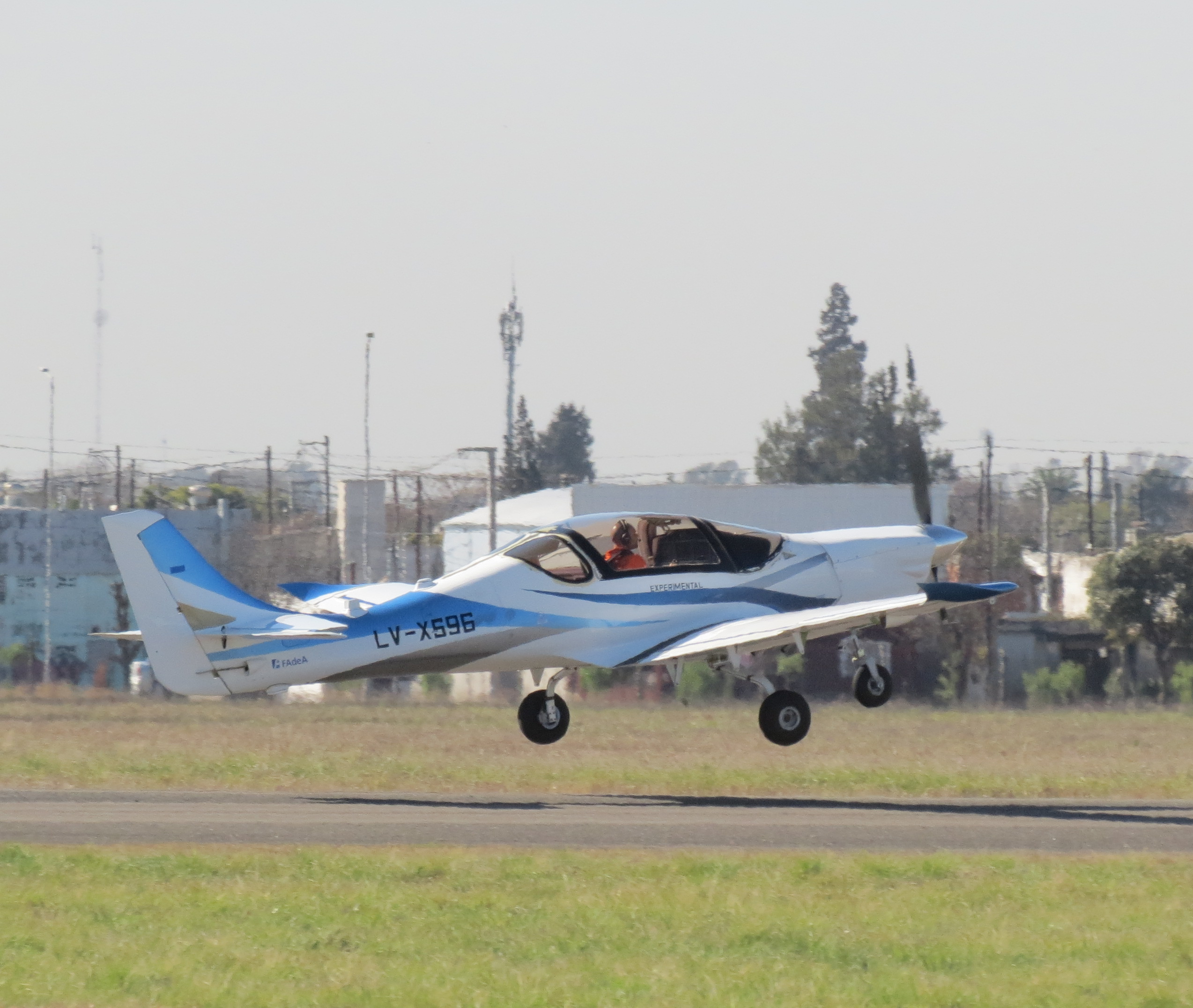
FAdeA I.A. 100, August 2016

=== Manufactured under license ===
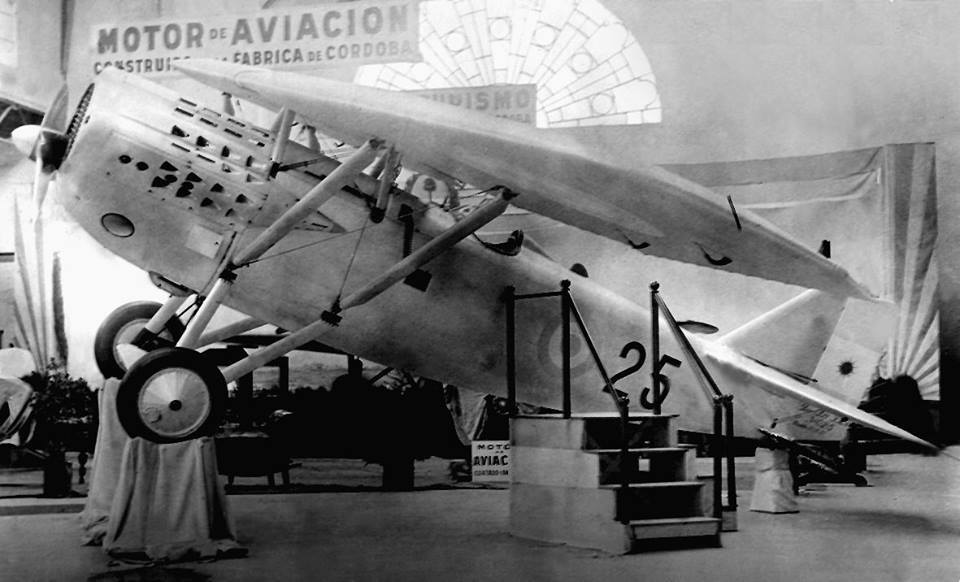
Dewotine D.21

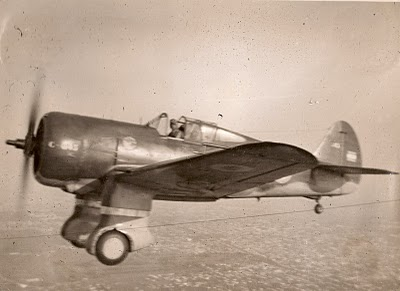
Curtiss Hawk 75O

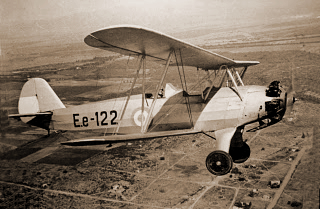
FW-44J Stieglitz

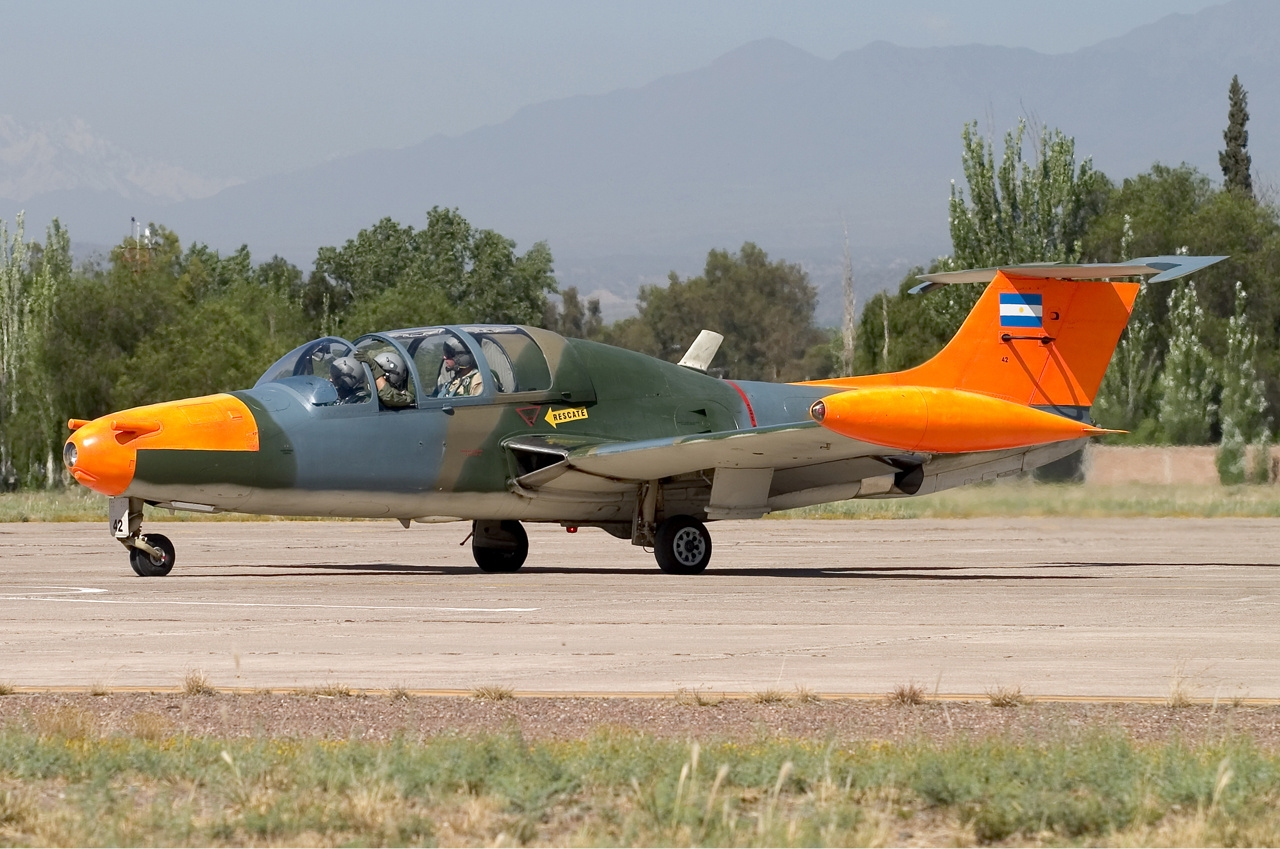
Morane-Saulnier MS-760 Paris, Mendoza, 2005

=== Engines ===
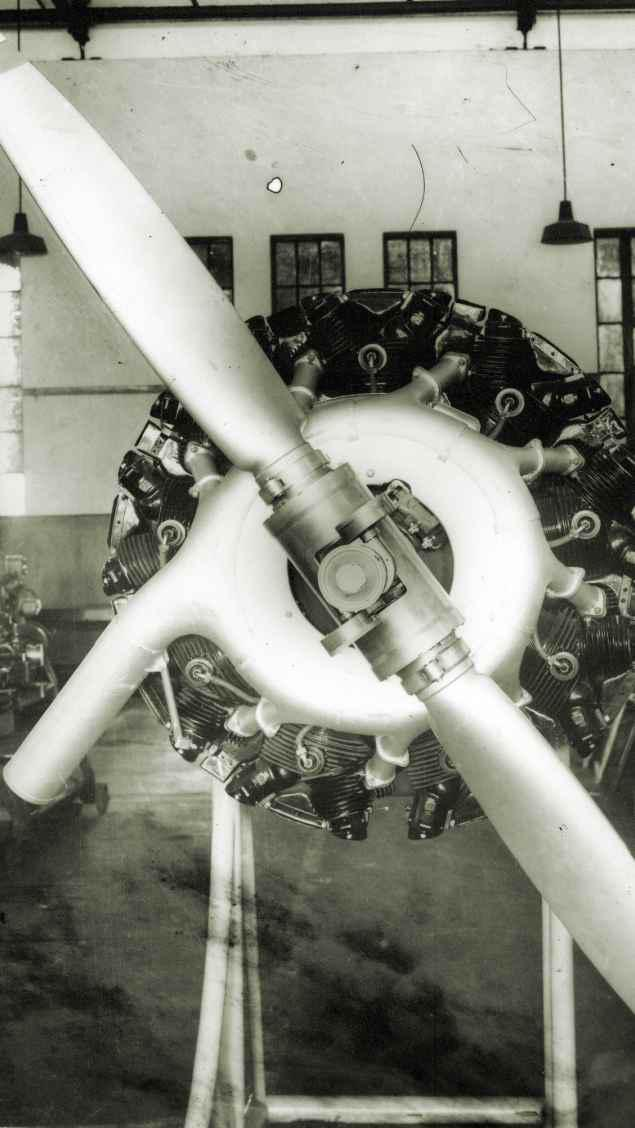
I.Ae. R-16 El Gaucho

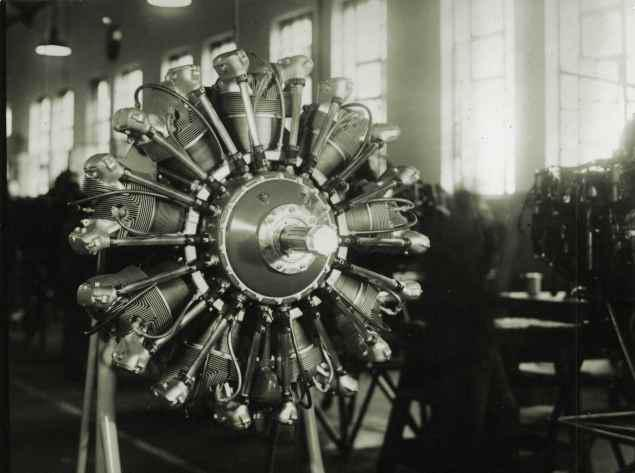
I.Ae. R-19 El Indio

== See also ==
Other aircraft manufacturers in Argentina

- Aero Boero
- Chincul
- Cicaré Helicópteros
