= FMA AeC.3 =

AeC.3 and AeC.4

General information
- Type: Utility aircraft
- Manufacturer: FMA
- Number built: 16

History
- First flight: 27 March 1934

The FMA AeC.3 was a light utility aircraft built in Argentina in 1934. The AeC.3 was a further development in the series of designs that had originated with the AeC.1 three years previously. Deliveries to Argentina's aeroclubs were made in late 1934.

== Development ==
Like its immediate predecessor, the AeC.2, the AeC.3 was an open-cockpit variant of the family, and was distinguished mainly in its use of an Warner Scarab engine.

On 21 January 1936, a refined version flew as the AeC.3G, with an uprated 145 HP Armstrong Siddeley Genet Major engine. The main innovation introduced on this aircraft was the use of flaps, the first Argentine aircraft to be so equipped. This aircraft first flew as an open-cockpit type, but later had a roof fitted to create an enclosed cabin.

A further development, the last in this family of aircraft, was the AeC.4 that flew on 17 October. This was essentially an AeC.3G with improved aerodynamics, and only a single example was built.

== Operational history ==
In 1935, Carola Lorenzini set a South American altitude record of 5,500 m (18,040 ft) in an AeC.3, and another aircraft of this type was flown by Santiago Germanó to win the aerobatics prize at the Resistencia air meet the same year. A final feat for the AeC.3 for 1935 was its use by Pedro B. Mórtola in a long-distance round-trip flight between Buenos Aires and Rio Gallegos, covering 5,200 km (3,200 mi) in 37 hours 20 minutes.

== Variants ==
- AeC.3 – version powered by a 125 HP Warner Scarab engine
  - AeC.3G – AeC.3 powered by a 145 HP Armstrong Siddeley Genet Major engine, and fitted with flaps
- AeC.4 – AeC.3G with improved aerodynamics

== Specifications (AeC.3) ==
General characteristics

- Crew: One pilot
- Capacity: 1 passenger
- Length: 8.20 m (26 ft 11 in)
- Wingspan: 12.30 m (40 ft 4 in)
- Height: 2.50 m (8 ft 2 in)
- Wing area: 19.0 m^{2} (205 sq ft)
- Empty weight: 670 kg (1,480 lb)
- Gross weight: 964 kg (2,125 lb)
- Powerplant: 1 × Armstrong Siddeley Genet Major , 97 kW (130 hp)

Performance

- Maximum speed: 170 km/h (105 mph, 91 kn)
- Range: 700 km (430 mi, 370 nmi)
- Service ceiling: 4,500 m (14,700 ft)
- Rate of climb: 4.2 m/s (840 ft/min)
