= FMA IA 36 Cóndor =

Proposed Argentine jet airliner

I.A. 36 Cóndor
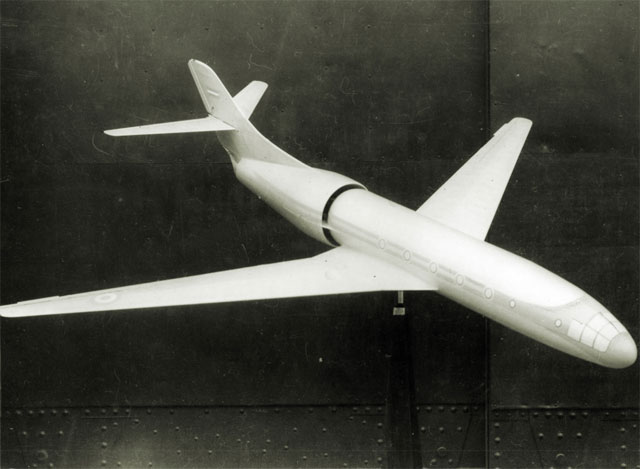
- IA 36 wind tunnel model

General information
- Type: Narrow-body jet airliner
- Manufacturer: FMA/IAME
- Designer: Kurt Tank
- Status: Cancelled

History
- First flight: Not flown

The IA 36 Cóndor (English: Condor) was a projected Argentine jet propelled mid-range airliner, designed in the early 1950s by Kurt Tank for the “Fábrica Militar de Aviones”. It was cancelled in 1958, with no prototypes built, but a full size wood mockup.

== Design and development ==
Work on the IA 36 Cóndor project started in late 1951 by a team led by the German engineer Kurt Tank; as part of the project a 1:34 scale wind tunnel model was built, as well as a 1:1 scale wooden fuselage mock-up. The project was cancelled in 1958 by the government led by Pedro Eugenio Aramburu, which followed that of Juan Domingo Perón, deposed in 1955 by the now quite infamous Revolución Libertadora uprising.

The projected aircraft would have been powered by five Rolls-Royce "Nene II" turbojets arranged in an annular configuration around the rear fuselage, as in Messerschmitt P.1110 and Heinkel He 211; however it was planned to replace those with lighter and more powerful engines in later versions.

The engine configuration had many drawbacks. To start with, the engine compartment inlet: as air flows over the fuselage a boundary layer builds up due to friction with the fuselage surface. This boundary layer has less energy than the air in the airstream further away from the aircraft. Notice the location of aft engines on the Boeing 727, Douglas DC-9, BAC111 and Sud Aviation Caravelle. These aircraft all have the engines mounted outside the boundary layer as far as possible. The Condor's engines would have received much less ram air pressure at the inlet, because the inlet design brought in air close to the fuselage and far back, where the boundary layer would he near its maximum. The engine location would have been a significant safety risk. If one engine caught fire there would be a greater likelihood of the other engines catching fire, and throwing a compressor or turbine blade would be more likely to affect the other engines. Note the efforts of other designs to mount engines away from each other and the aircraft itself.

The design would have accommodated 32 to 40 passengers; the maximum speed was expected to be 950 km/h (590 mph); in comparison, the contemporary de Havilland Comet 3 maximum speed was 780 km/h (480 mph). Like the Pulqui II fighter prototype, also designed by Tank, the IA 36 had swept wings which would have increased the aerodynamic efficiency. The wingspan was 34 m (112 ft); and the estimated range was 5,000 km (3,100 mi; 2,700 nmi).

== Specifications ==
Data from

General characteristics

- Crew: 3-4
- Capacity: 32-40 passengers
- Wingspan: 34 m (111 ft 7 in)
- Powerplant: 5 × Rolls-Royce Nene centrifugal-flow turbojet engines

Performance

- Maximum speed: 950 km/h (590 mph, 510 kn)
- Range: 5,000 km (3,100 mi, 2,700 nmi)

== See also ==
- Avro Canada C102 Jetliner
- Tupolev Tu-104

Aircraft of comparable role, configuration, and era

- de Havilland Comet
- Sud Aviation Caravelle
- Vickers V-1000

Related lists

- List of jet airliners
