= FMA AeC.2 =

AeC.2 and derivatives
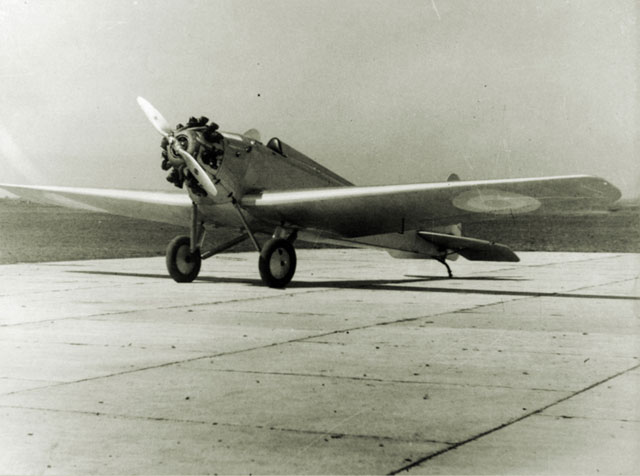

General information
- Type: Utility aircraft
- Manufacturer: FMA
- Number built: 71

History
- First flight: 18 April 1932

The FMA AeC.2 was a light utility aircraft built in Argentina in the early 1930s, and also produced as a military trainer and observation aircraft under the designations AeME.1, AeMO.1, AeMOe.1 and AeMOe.2.

== Development ==
The design was derived from the AeC.1, but instead of an enclosed cabin, featured two open cockpits in tandem. Only two of the civil AeC.2s were built, but these were followed by seven AeME.1 trainers. Six of the AeME.1s, plus one of the AeC.2s, participated in a long-distance publicity tour of Brazil as part of the "Sol de Mayo" squadron.

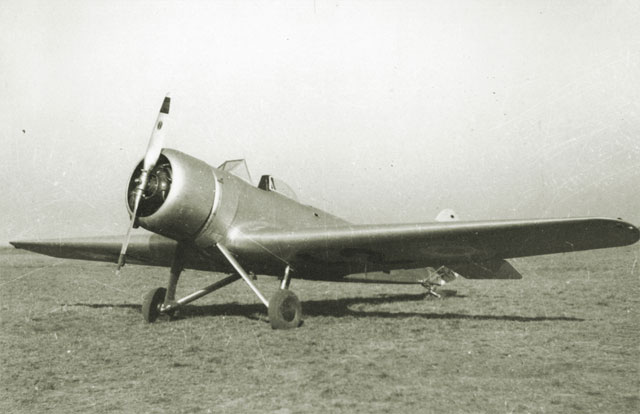
AeMOe.1

In 1934, a version with a revised empennage, the AeMO.1, was developed as an observation machine; 41 examples of which were delivered from July onwards. Some of these were armed with a trainable .303 Vickers machine gun in the observer's cockpit, and some with twin synchronised machine guns in the forward fuselage.

Six AeMOe.1s followed, for crew training in the Observation role, which were generally similar in design but featuring a NACA cowling for the engine, and then the definitive AeMOe.2 version appeared in 1937 with a further refined empennage, 61 examples of which were built.

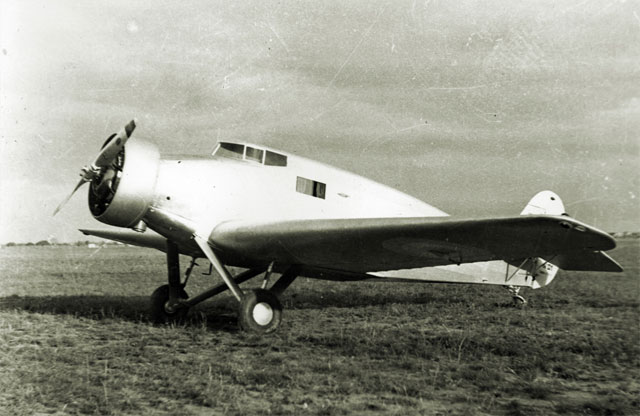
AeMS.1 prototype

Also based on the AeMOe.1, the sole AeMS.1 was an air ambulance version with an enclosed cabin that could carry four stretchers and an attendant.

== Variants ==
- AeC.2 (Civil) - civil version (2 built)
- AeME.1 (Militar de Entrenamiento) - military trainer (7 built)
- AeMO.1 (Militar de Observación) - military observation aircraft (41 built)
- AeMOe.1 (Militar de Observación y Entrenamiento) - military observation and trainer aircraft (6 built)
- AeMOe.2 - military observation and trainer aircraft (14 built)
- AeMS.1 - (Militar Sanitario) - military air ambulance (1 built)

== Specifications (AeME.1) ==
General characteristics

- Crew: Two, pilot and instructor
- Length: 7.90 m (25 ft 11 in)
- Wingspan: 12.00 m (39 ft 4 in)
- Height: 2.70 m (8 ft 10 in)
- Wing area: 16.9 m^{2} (182 sq ft)
- Empty weight: 650 kg (1,430 lb)
- Gross weight: 1,130 kg (2,490 lb)
- Powerplant: 1 × Wright R-760 , 180 kW (240 hp)

Performance

- Maximum speed: 220 km/h (140 mph, 120 kn)
- Range: 1,500 km (930 mi, 810 nmi)
- Service ceiling: 5,000 m (16,400 ft)
- Rate of climb: 4.2 m/s (820 ft/min)

== See also ==
Related lists

- List of Interwar military aircraft
