= FAdeA IA-100 Malvina =

IA-100
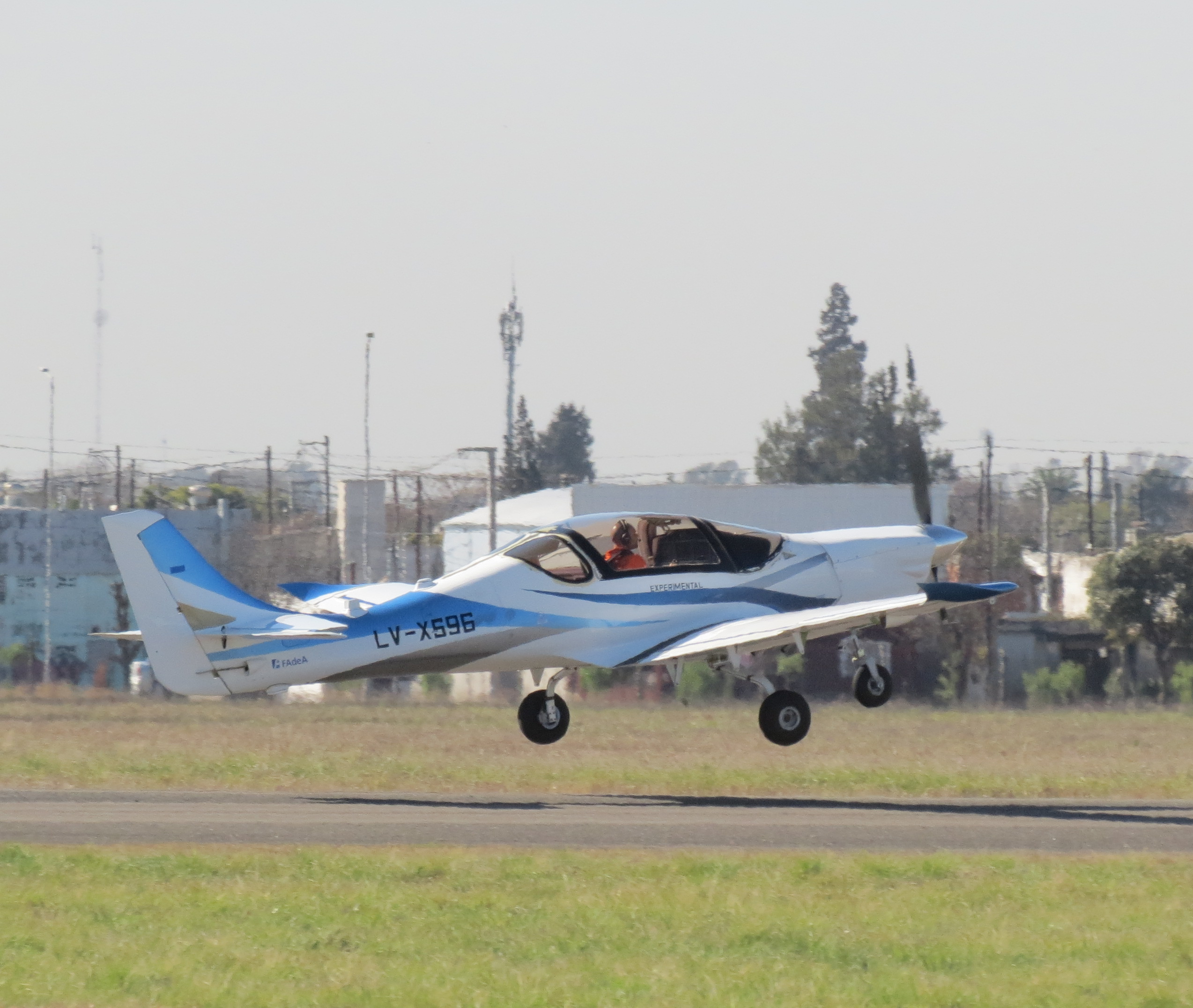

General information
- Type: Trainer aircraft
- National origin: Argentina
- Manufacturer: Fábrica Argentina de Aviones
- Status: Completed
- Number built: 1

History
- First flight: 8 August 2016
- Developed from: Grob G 120TP

The FAdeA IA-100 Malvina is an Argentine trainer aircraft developed by the Fábrica Argentina de Aviones (FAdeA) from December 2014. It was first flown in 2016.

== Design and development ==
The IA-100 was developed as a result of a project to demonstrate FAdeA's current design and production capabilities, as a basis for a future indigenous training aircraft. The design was based on the German Grob G120 monoplane. The outcome was a technology demonstrator that incorporated processes and materials common in many industries but still new to FAdeA, such as composite materials.

In August 2020, the Argentinian Ministry of Defence named the aircraft "Malvina", after the Spanish language name for the, in English, Falkland Islands.

== Specifications ==
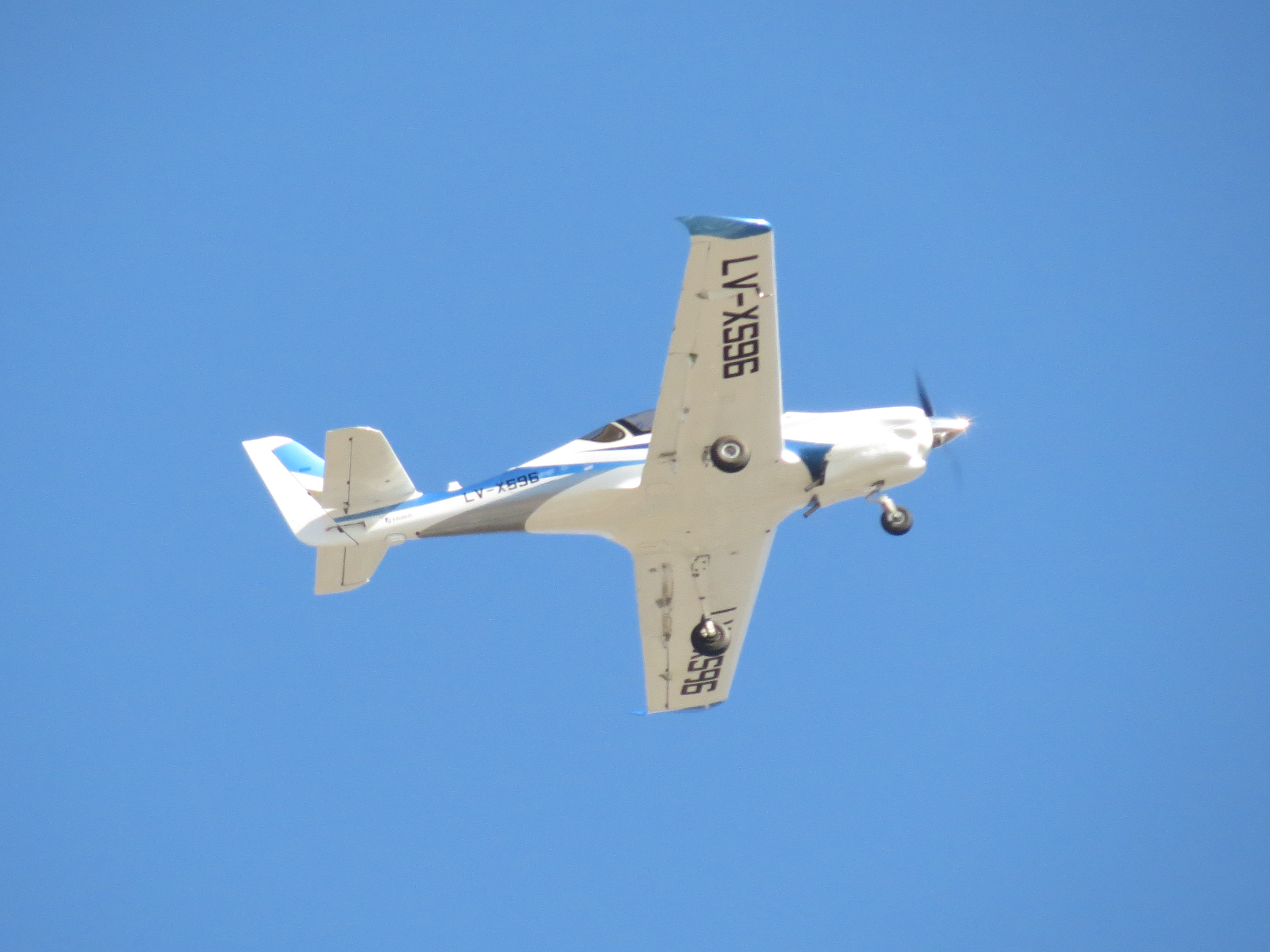
IA-100 during its first flight in 2016

Data from

General characteristics

- Crew: 2, side by side
- Length: 7.8 m (25 ft 7 in)
- Wingspan: 9.4 m (30 ft 10 in)
- Height: 2.4 m (7 ft 10 in)
- Wing area: 12.5 m^{2} (135 sq ft)
- Empty weight: 637 kg (1,404 lb)
- Max takeoff weight: 950 kg (2,094 lb)
- Powerplant: 1 × Lycoming AEIO-360 B1F , 130 kW (180 hp)

Performance

- Cruise speed: 250 km/h (160 mph, 135 kn) maximum
- Stall speed: 102 km/h (63 mph, 55 kn) with flaps up
- Ferry range: 850 km (530 mi, 460 nmi)
- Service ceiling: 5,486 m (18,000 ft)
- Rate of climb: 6.1 m/s (1,200 ft/min)
