= FMA IA 54 Carancho =

Experimental Argentinian Glider

IA 54

General information
- Role: Prototype glider
- National origin: Argentina
- Manufacturer: Instituto Aerotécnico
- Number built: 1

History
- First flight: September 1965
- Fate: Stored away and eventually scrapped
- Predecessors: IA 49

The FMA IA 54 Carancho, also known as the Andean Condor, was a prototype 2-seater glider designed in 1963 by Ricardo Emilio Olmedo and manufactured by Argentinian company Instituto Aerotécnico. The purpose of the glider was to test Dr. Reimar Horten's previous work exploring laminar-flow airfoils, and only one prototype was ever built. The IA 54 was also made entirely out of wood.

== Specifications ==
Wing area: 29 m^{2}

Maximum weight: 548 kg

Maximum speed: 240 km/h
