= FAdeA IA 73 =

Argentinian trainer aircraft

IA-73
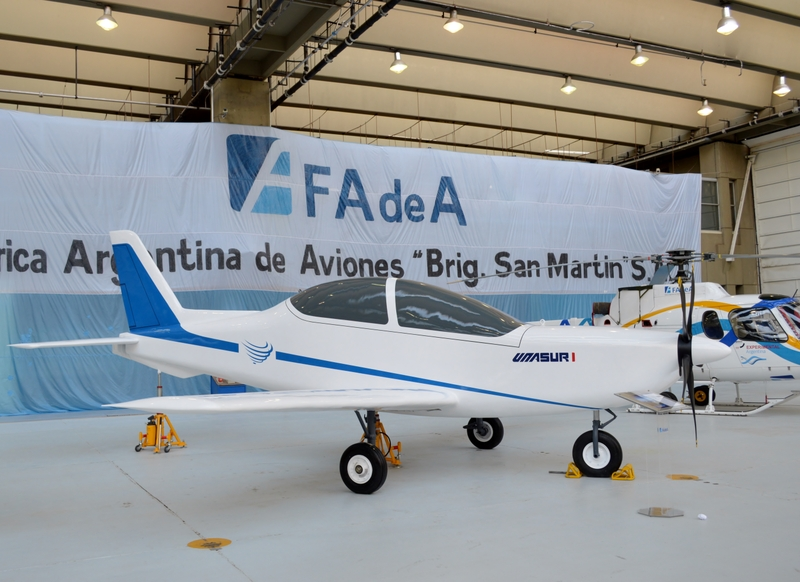
- A model of the UNASIR 1 at a FAdeA aircraft exposition.

General information
- Role: Military trainer
- National origin: Argentina
- Manufacturer: Fábrica Argentina de Aviones
- Service: Argentine Air Force
- Number built: 1

History
- First flight: 2013

The IA-73 is an Argentinian trainer aircraft developed by Fábrica Argentina de Aviones (FAdeA) since 2009. The purpose of the IA-73 is to replace the obsolete Beechcraft T-34 Mentor and Embraer EMB 312 Tucano in service with the Argentine Air Force (AAF), as well as develop a trainer aircraft for export to other Latin American nations.

== Development ==
In December 2009, FAdeA began the project assessment phase. The project, titled IA-73 UNASUR 1 [Union of South American Nations], would be a joint effort between Argentina, Brazil, Venezuela, Bolivia, and Ecuador to develop a modern trainer aircraft. FAdeA (Argentina's primary aircraft manufacturer) would produce the design with the assistance of Brazil, Venezuela, and Ecuador, and Bolivia would provide additional funding for the project. This plan was approved by FAdeA's board of directors in late August 2010, and shortly after discussions were launched with the AAF. The first flight would take place in 2013. However, since then the IA-73 has experienced continuing delays in entering service. Original estimates by FAdeA put the aircraft's entry into service for 2015, but that would later be pushed to 2017, and since then information on the project has slowed.

For the engine, FAdeA settled on a single American-Canadian Pratt & Whitney Canada PT6. Considering the potential of the IA-73 in the international market, plans were also laid for a partnership with the Chinese company CATIC to provide an alternate engine for nations who refrain from business with the United States.

== Cost and service ==
The cost to develop the first prototype ended up at around 12 million US$. The total local program cost for 52 aircraft (50 production units and 2 prototype units) would end up around 115 million US$, and the unit cost for the IA-73 would settle at an estimated 1.8 million US$.

While no units have been sold yet, a few countries have made plans to procure the IA-73 upon the completion of its development. Currently, the AAF plans on purchasing 50 units, Venezuela plans on purchasing 24 units, and Ecuador plans on purchasing 18 units.

== Specifications ==
General characteristics

- Crew: 2
- Length: 7.8 m (25 ft 7 in)
- Width: 8.8 m (28 ft 10 in)
- Height: 3.0 m (9 ft 10.1 in)
- Empty weight: 850 kg (1,874 lb)
- Max takeoff weight: 1,500 kg (3,307 lb)
- Propellers: 4-bladed

Performance

- Maximum speed: 500 km/h (311 mph, 270 kn)
- Range: 1,000 km (621 mi, 540 nmi)
- Service ceiling: 4,000 m (13,123 ft)
- Rate of climb: 15 m/s (3,000 ft/min)
