= FMA IA-59 =

IA-59
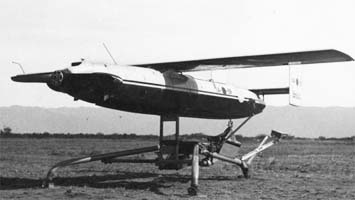

General information
- Type: Unmanned aerial vehicle
- National origin: Argentina
- Manufacturer: Fabrica Militar de Aviones
- Status: On display
- Number built: 1

History
- First flight: 9 December 1972

The FMA IA-59 is a 1970s Argentine single-engined unmanned aerial vehicle, designed and built for the Argentine Air Force by Fabrica Militar de Aviones.

== Development ==
The small UAV first flew on 9 December 1972 powered by a McCulloch piston engine.

== Aircraft on display ==
The only IA-59 built is on display at the Museum of Industry in Córdoba Province, Argentina.
