= I.Ae. 31 Colibrí =

Argentinian aircraft (1947)

I.Ae.31 Colibrí
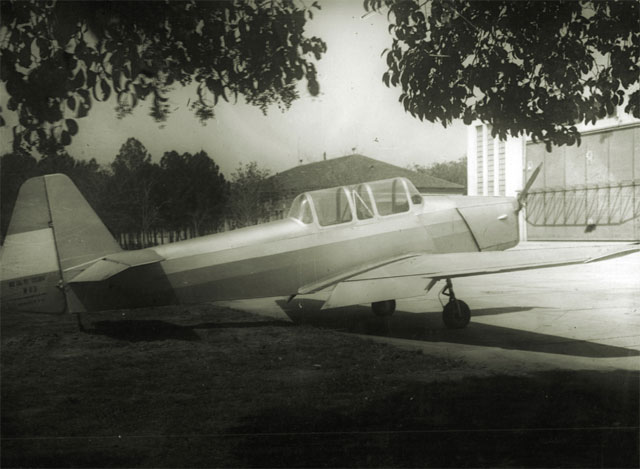

General information
- Type: Civil trainer
- National origin: Argentina
- Manufacturer: Instituto Aerotécnico
- Designer: Émile Dewoitine
- Number built: 3

History
- First flight: 18 September 1947

The I.Ae.31 Colibrí ("Hummingbird") was a civilian trainer aircraft developed in Argentina in the 1940s.

== Design and development ==
It was designed by Émile Dewoitine and developed by the Instituto Aerotécnico for manufacture by the company H. Goberna factories in Córdoba Province as an initiative under President Juan Perón's first five-year plan.

The design used the AeC.3G of the early 1930s as a starting point, but was a considerably modernized aircraft. Like the AeC.3G, however, it was a conventional low-wing cantilever monoplane with seating for student pilot and instructor in tandem and fixed tailwheel undercarriage. Unlike its predecessor, the cockpits were enclosed under a long canopy. Only three units were built.

== Specifications ==
Data from Jane's All the World's Aircraft 1951–52

General characteristics

- Crew: 2
- Length: 7.95 m (26 ft 1 in)
- Wingspan: 10.37 m (34 ft 0 in)
- Height: 1.90 m (6 ft 3 in)
- Airfoil: NACA 23012
- Empty weight: 635 kg (1,400 lb)
- Gross weight: 916 kg (2,019 lb)
- Fuel capacity: 135 L (30 imp gal; 36 US gal)
- Powerplant: 1 × Blackburn Cirrus Major 3 air-cooled inverted four-cylinder inline engine, 116 kW (155 hp)
- Propellers: 2-bladed de-Havilland controllable-pitch propeller

Performance

- Maximum speed: 240 km/h (150 mph, 130 kn)
- Cruise speed: 210 km/h (130 mph, 110 kn)
- Service ceiling: 6,500 m (21,300 ft)

== See also ==
Related development

- FMA AeC.3
