= FMA IA 62 =

IA 62

General information
- Type: Trainer
- Manufacturer: FMA
- Status: Cancelled project

The FMA IA 62 was a military trainer aircraft under development in Argentina in the late 1970s.

== Development ==
It was developed by the Fabrica Militar de Aviones (FMA) in response to an Argentine Air Force request for a replacement for its Beech B-45 "Mentor" trainers then in service. The new aircraft was to combine its main role as a primary trainer with secondary roles as a reconnaissance and light attack aircraft.

The resulting design was for a low-wing cantilever monoplane with retractable tricycle undercarriage. The pilot and instructor were to sit in tandem under a long bubble canopy, and the Turbomeca Astazou turboprop was selected as a powerplant.

A scale model was displayed at the 1978 Paris Air Show, but the project was cancelled shortly afterwards.

== Specifications (as designed) ==
General characteristics

- Crew: Two, pilot and instructor
- Length: 11.30 m (37 ft 1 in)
- Wingspan: 10.53 m (34 ft 7 in)
- Height: 3.45 m (11 ft 4 in)
- Wing area: 19.4 m^{2} (209 sq ft)
- Empty weight: 1,460 kg (3,220 lb)
- Gross weight: 2,528 kg (5,573 lb)
- Powerplant: 1 × Turbomeca Astazou XIV F , 405 kW (543 hp)

Performance

- Maximum speed: 412 km/h (256 mph, 222 kn)
- Range: 1,080 km (670 mi, 580 nmi)
- Service ceiling: 6,750 m (22,150 ft)

Armament

- 2 × fixed, forward-firing 7.62 mm machine guns in wings
- disposable stores on two underwing hardpoints
