= Émile Dewoitine =

French businessman (1892–1979)

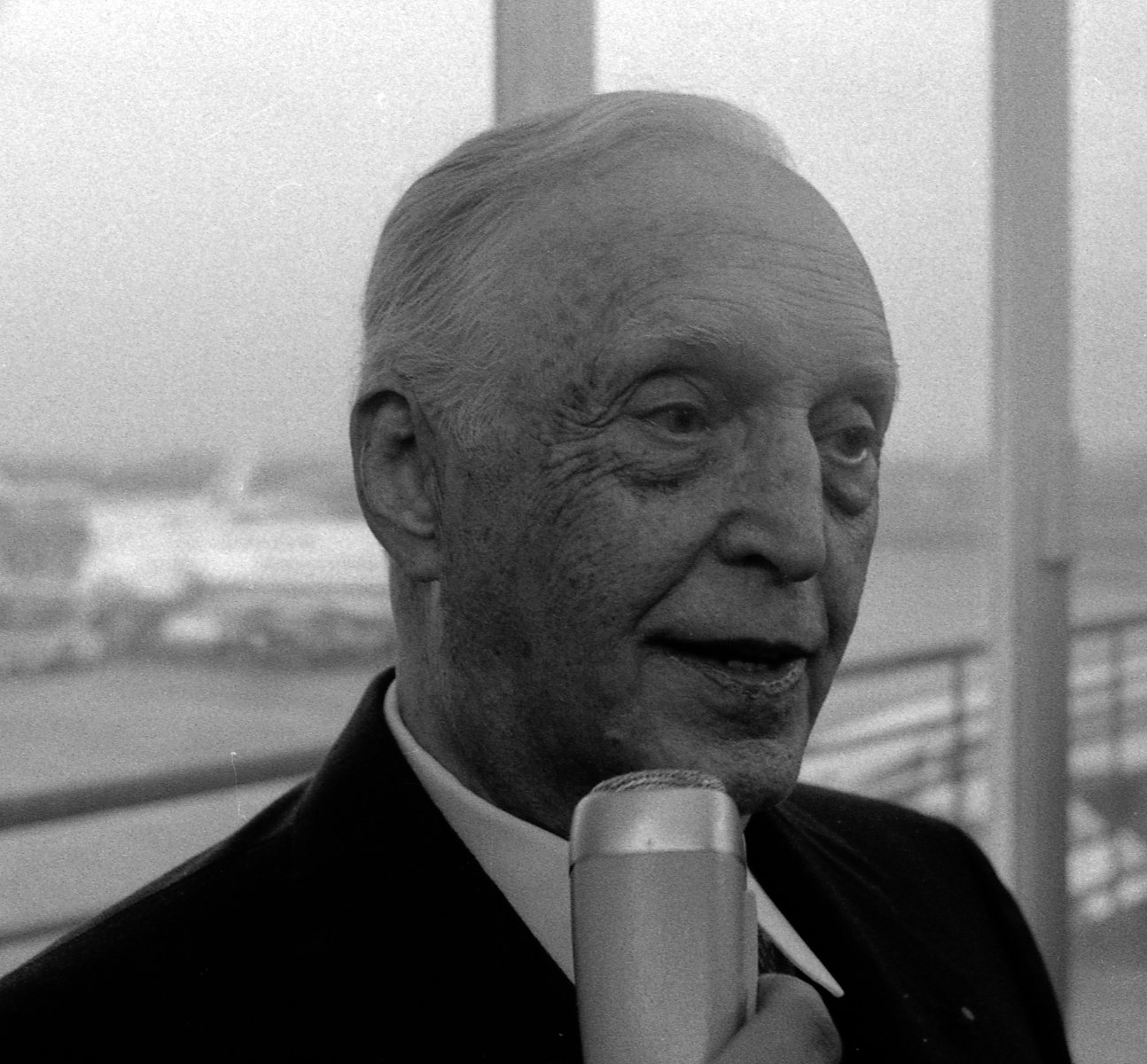
- Born: 26 September 1892; Crépy-en-Laonnais, France
- Died: 5 July 1979 (aged 86)
- Occupation: Aviation industrialist

Émile Dewoitine (26 September 1892 – 5 July 1979) was a French aviation industrialist.

== Prewar industrial activities ==
Born in Crépy-en-Laonnais, Émile Dewoitine entered the aviation industry by working at Latécoère during World War I. In 1920, he founded his own company, but facing little success at home, went to Switzerland where his Dewoitine D.27 fighter was accepted for operational service. In 1931, Dewoitine went back to France and founded Société Aéronautique Française - Avions Dewoitine. During the 1930s, several noteworthy aircraft rolled out of the Toulouse-based Dewoitine factories including the Dewoitine D.500, the French Air Force's first fully metallic, monoplane fighter, as well as the Dewoitine D.338 airliner. In 1936, part of the French aviation industry was nationalized and Dewoitine's factories were absorbed by the state-owned SNCAM. During the Battle of France in 1940, the Dewoitine D.520 turned out to be France's best fighter aircraft.

== World War II ==
After the successful invasion of France by Germany in 1940 culminated in an armistice with Germany and the creation of the Vichy government, Dewoitine briefly tried to start a business in the United States. This caused him to be tried for treason under the Vichy government. Dewoitine went back to work with SIPA which, after an agreement between the Vichy government and German authorities, was manufacturing trainer aircraft intended for the Luftwaffe, including a derivative of the Arado Ar 96, which would later be known as the SIPA S.10.

== Postwar exile ==
Facing charges of collaborationism after the liberation of France, Dewoitine fled to Spain, where he developed a derivative of the D.520 with Hispano Aviación. He later went to Argentina, where he worked for the Industria Aeronáutica Militar, developing the Pulqui I, the first South American jet plane, and Colibrí, a trainer aircraft. In France, Dewoitine was condemned in absentia to a 20-year forced labour term in 1948. At the end of this career, he resided in Switzerland. Once his crimes were prescribed under the statute of limitations, he returned to France and finished his life in Toulouse.
