= FMA AeMB.2 =

1930s Argentinian bomber aircraft

AeMB.1 and AeMB.2 Bombi
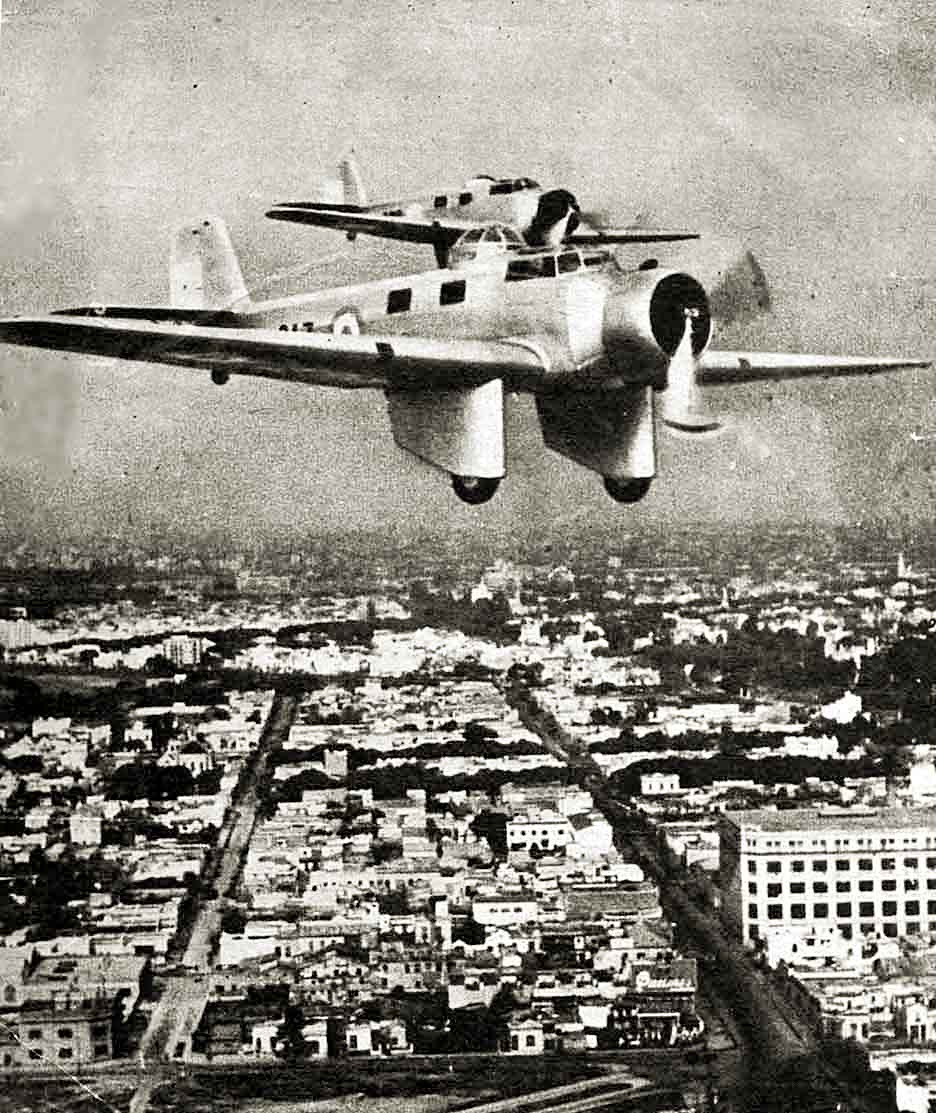

General information
- Type: Bomber
- Manufacturer: FMA
- Primary user: Argentine Air Force
- Number built: 16

History
- Introduction date: 1936
- First flight: 9 October 1935
- Retired: 1945

The FMA AeMB.2 Bombi was a bomber aircraft developed in Argentina in the mid-1930s. It was a low-wing cantilever monoplane of conventional configuration. It was fitted with fixed tailwheel undercarriage, the main units of which were covered by long, "trouser"-style fairings. The initial AeMB.1 configuration was fitted with a dorsal machine gun turret, later removed from the AeMB.2 to improve stability. Fifteen production examples saw service with the Argentine Air Force between 1936 and 1945. Two were lost to air accidents.

== Variants ==
- AeMB.1 - initial design with dorsal gun turret
- AeMB.2 - improved design, turret removed to improve stability

== Specifications (AeMB.2) ==
General characteristics

- Crew: Three
- Length: 10.90 m (35 ft 9 in)
- Wingspan: 17.20 m (56 ft 5 in)
- Height: 2.80 m (9 ft 2 in)
- Wing area: 25.0 m^{2} (269 sq ft)
- Empty weight: 2,120 kg (4,670 lb)
- Gross weight: 3,500 kg (7,710 lb)
- Powerplant: 1 × Wright R-1820-F3 , 533 kW (715 hp)

Performance

- Maximum speed: 285 km/h (177 mph, 154 kn)
- Range: 600 km (370 mi, 320 nmi)
- Service ceiling: 6,000 m (19,685 ft)
- Rate of climb: 5.5 m/s (1,100 ft/min)

Armament

- 1 fixed forward-firing 11.35 mm Madsen gun in forward fuselage
- 1 trainable, rearward-firing 0.45 machine gun in ventral position
- 400 kg (880 lb) of bombs

== See also ==
Related lists

- List of Interwar military aircraft
