= I.Ae. 30 Ñancú =

Argentine fighter aircraft

I.Ae. 30 "Ñancú"
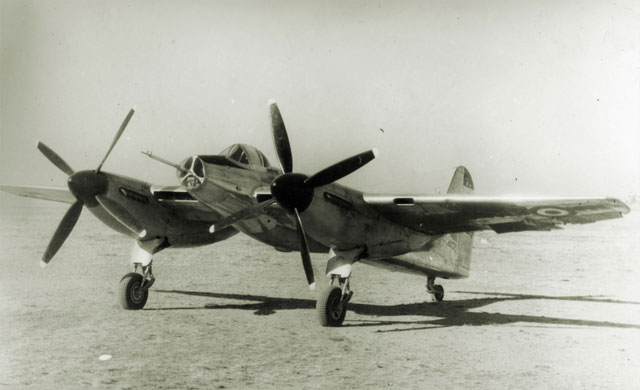
- The I.Ae. 30 prototype in 1948

General information
- Type: Fighter
- Manufacturer: Fabrica Militar de Aviones (FMA)
- Designer: Cesare Pallavicino
- Status: Cancelled
- Primary user: the Fuerza Aérea Argentina (intended)
- Number built: 1 prototype completed (2 others unfinished)

History
- First flight: 17 July 1948
- Retired: 1948

The I.Ae. 30 "Ñancú" was an Argentine twin piston engined fighter designed by the Instituto Aerotécnico (AeroTechnical Institute) in the late 1940s, similar to the de Havilland Hornet, but made of metal rather than wood. Only one prototype was completed; the project was abandoned in favour of the FMA I.Ae. 27 Pulqui I jet aircraft.

== Design and development ==
The I.Ae. 30 "Ñancú", named after an indigenous eagle of Patagonia, was designed by Italian engineer Cesare Pallavicino, who had come to Argentina in 1946. Pallavicino led a team of Argentine technicians and engineers in developing the concept of a high-speed escort fighter, intended to be operated in conjunction with the Avro Lincoln bombers used in the Argentine Air Force.

The I.Ae. 30 had a metal structure, its powerplants consisted of two Rolls-Royce Merlin 604 engines, each developing 1,800 hp at 3,000 RPM, and four-bladed propellers. The armament would consist of six 20 mm Oerlikon automatic cannons mounted in the nose, although later plans called for 20 mm Hispano-Suiza cannons as well as a 250 kg bomb under the fuselage and two batteries of five 83 mm rockets fitted underneath the wings. Nevertheless, the prototypes were unarmed.

By the end of 1947, a contract was received for the first of three projected prototypes. On 9 June 1948 the first prototype was ready for ground tests and on 17 July 1948, the I.Ae. 30 took to the air for the first time, piloted by Captain Edmundo Osvaldo Weiss.

== Operational history ==
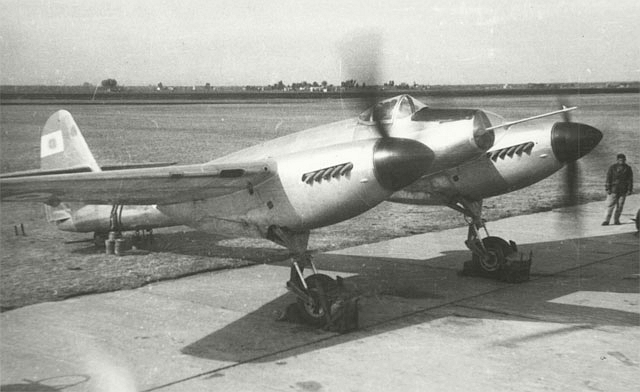
I.Ae.30 Ñancú during testing, c. 1948

The test results proved that the aircraft possessed good flying characteristics as well as meeting performance specifications. During a cross country flight, from Córdoba to Buenos Aires, the Ñancú reached a level speed of 780 km/h, setting a new piston-engined speed record in South America, an achievement that has not been surpassed. Although the prototype was achieving design goals, the Fuerza Aérea Argentina was already considering the jet I.Ae. 27 Pulqui I as their future fighter program.

With official interest diminishing, in early 1949, the sole flying prototype was badly damaged in a landing accident when test pilot Carlos Fermín Bergaglio misjudged a landing and crashed. Although the pilot was uninjured and the aircraft could have been repaired, the Fabrica Militar de Aviones made a decision to abandon the project with the wrecked prototype, as well as the two unfinished prototypes still at the factory being scrapped.

== Variants ==
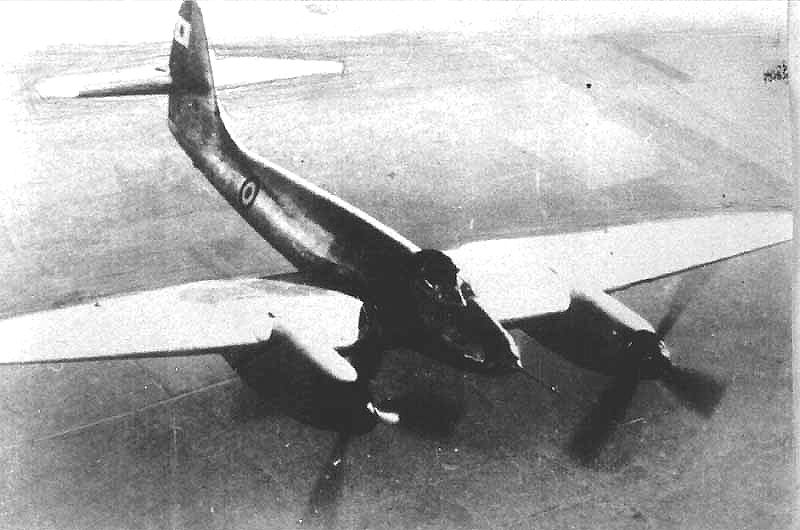
I.Ae.30 Ñancú, c. 1948

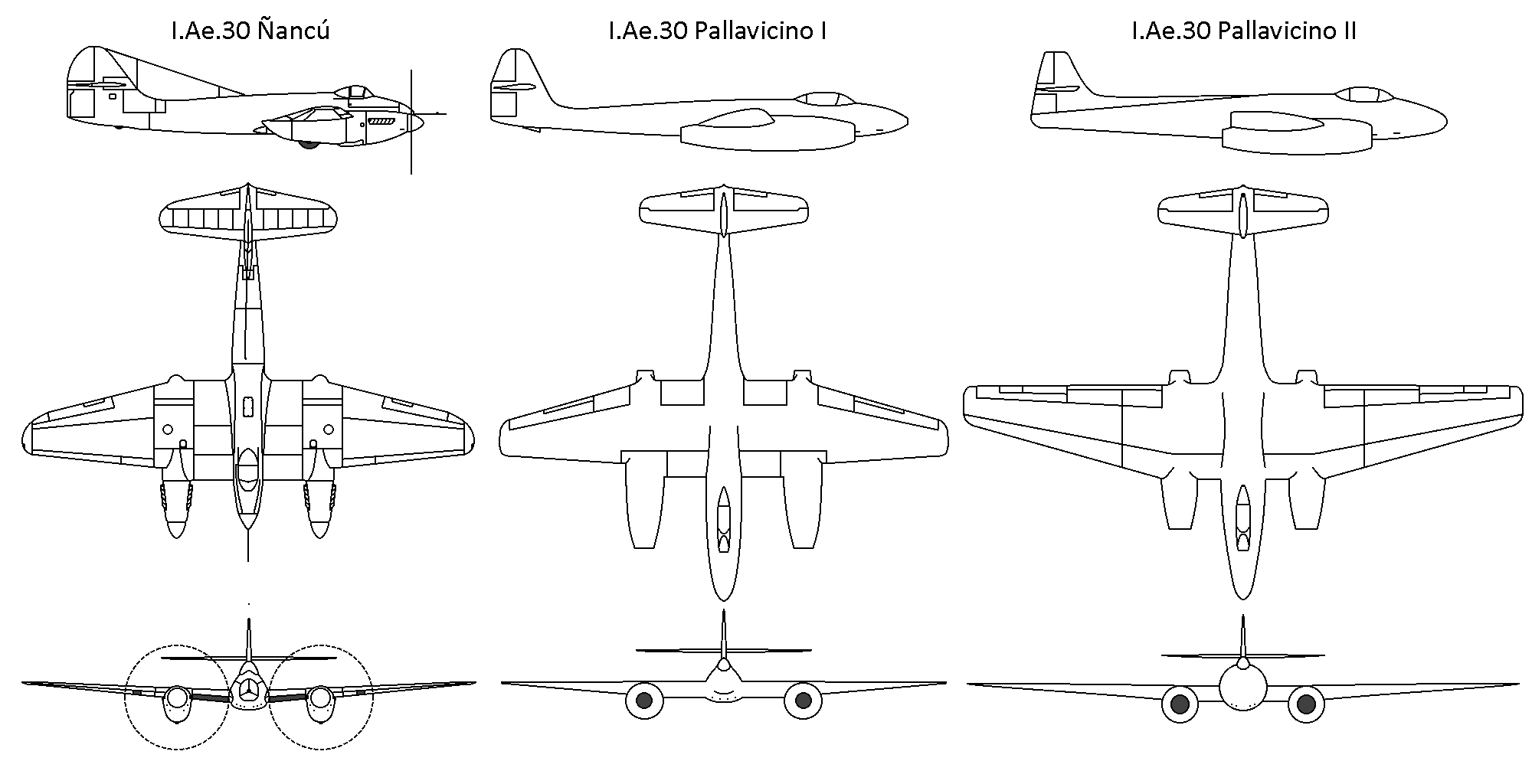
The 3 variants of the I.Ae.30

I.Ae 30 Ñancú
Fighter/Interceptor/Heavy fighter/Attacker variant, three prototypes built, one tested and crashed, two incomplete airframes later scrapped after the program was cancelled.

I.Ae.30 Pallavicino I
Jet modification of the IAe-30 Ñancú, also designed by Cesare Pallavicino, was to be a single-seat fighter plane in a class similar to that of the Gloster Meteor. It featured the same fuselage as the normal IAe.30 Ñancú but its inline engine nacelles were replaced with jet engine nacelles each having a Rolls-Royce Derwent engine each producing 3.500 lb static thrust. Its cockpit was replaced with a lengthened one featuring a full metal nose instead of the glazed nose of the Ñancú. It was to have four 20 mm Hispano-Suiza autocannons "in" the nose instead of the six 20 mm autocannons featured on the Ñancú which were located "beneath" the nose. None built.

I.Ae.30 Pallavicino II
Similar to the Pallavicino I but it featured lengthened swept wings and a more square looking tail. It was to be a light bomber/attacker with two crew: a pilot and a navigator. The navigator was to be seated either in a glazed nose or behind the pilot (then with a solid nose). Armament included four 20mm Hispano-Suiza autocannons and two bombs of 900 or 1,000 kg each in an internal bomb bay. It could also carry twenty 75mm air-to-ground rockets. None built.

== Specifications (I.Ae. 30) ==
General characteristics

- Crew: one
- Length: 11.52 m (37 ft 10 in)
- Wingspan: 15 m (49 ft 3 in)
- Height: 5.16 m (16 ft 11 in)
- Wing area: 35.32 m^{2} (380.2 sq ft)
- Empty weight: 6,208 kg (13,686 lb)
- Gross weight: 7,600 kg (16,755 lb)
- Powerplant: 2 × Rolls-Royce Merlin 604 V-12 liquid-cooled piston engines, 1,342 kW (1,800 hp) each

Performance

- Maximum speed: 740 km/h (460 mph, 400 kn)
- Cruise speed: 500 km/h (310 mph, 270 kn)
- Range: 2,700 km (1,700 mi, 1,500 nmi)
- Endurance: 5 hrs 25 min
- Service ceiling: 8,000 m (26,000 ft)
- Wing loading: 215 kg/m^{2} (44 lb/sq ft)
- Power/mass: 0.353 kW/kg (0.215 hp/lb)

Armament

- 6 × 20 mm cannons
- 1 × 250 kg bomb (under fuselage)
- 10 × rockets (under wings)

== See also ==
Aircraft of comparable role, configuration, and era

- De Havilland Hornet

== Bibliography ==
- Aero Fan n. 61 (in Italian), April–June 1997.
- "Article online on the 75th Anniversary of the 'Fabrica Militar de Aviones'. (in Spanish) aeroespacio.com, Buenos Aires: Aerospacio, 2002.
- Burzaco, Ricardo. Las Alas de Perón: Aeronaútica Argentina 1945/1960 (in Spanish). New York: Ed. Da Vinci, 1995. ISBN 978-987-96764-4-8.
- Buttler, Tony (January–February 2005). "Argentine Twins: IAe 24 Calquin and IAe 30 Nancu". Air Enthusiast. No. 115. pp. 29–33. ISSN 0143-5450.
- Green, William & Swanborough, Gordon (2001) [1994]. The Complete Book of Fighters: An Illustrated Encyclopedia of Every Fighter Built and Flown (Revised and Updated ed.). London: Salamander Books. ISBN 1-84065-269-1.
- Lezon, Ricardo M. & Rivas, Santiago (2021). "The Patagonian Eagle: Argentina's Instituto Aerotécnico IAe.30 Nancú: The Full Story". The Aviation Historian (35): 80–92. ISSN 2051-1930.
