= FMA AeC.1 =

AeC.1
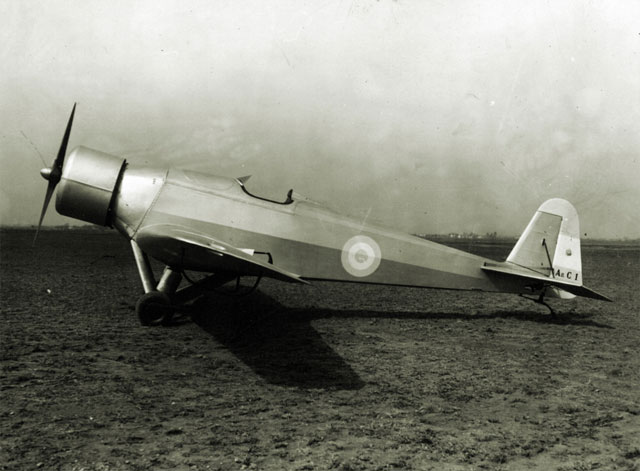

General information
- Type: Utility aircraft
- Manufacturer: FMA

History
- First flight: 28 October 1931

The FMA AeC.1 was a light utility aircraft built in Argentina in 1931; it was the first aircraft of domestic design to be produced by Fabrica Militar de Aviones (FMA). It was a low-wing cantilever monoplane of conventional configuration with fixed tailskid undercarriage. As originally designed, the fully enclosed cabin had three seats, but this was later reduced to two. The passenger seat could be readily removed to make way for a stretcher to facilitate its use as an air ambulance.

== Specifications ==
General characteristics

- Crew: One pilot
- Capacity: 2 passengers
- Length: 7.75 m (25 ft 5 in)
- Wingspan: 12.00 m (39 ft 4 in)
- Height: 3.16 m (10 ft 4 in)
- Wing area: 16.9 m^{2} (182 sq ft)
- Empty weight: 700 kg (1,540 lb)
- Gross weight: 1,120 kg (2,470 lb)
- Powerplant: 1 × Armstrong Siddeley Mongoose , 112 kW (150 hp)

Performance

- Maximum speed: 180 km/h (110 mph, 96 kn)
- Range: 1,300 km (810 mi, 700 nmi)
- Service ceiling: 4,300 m (14,100 ft)
- Rate of climb: 3.3 m/s (660 ft/min)
