= List of automobiles manufactured in Argentina =

This is a list of automobile models which are / or have been manufactured in Argentina.

== Current models ==
Brand	Model	Since
Agrale	A7500	2016
Agrale	A8700	2016
Agrale	A10000	2016
Chevrolet	Cruze	2016
Chevrolet	Tracker (2019)	2022
Citroën	Berlingo	1999
Coradir	TITO	2021
Coradir	TITA	2022
Fiat	Cronos	2018
Ford	Ranger	1996
Foton	Aumark TM1 (assembled)	2022
Mercedes-Benz	Sprinter	1996
Mercedes-Benz	Vito	2015
Nissan	Frontier	2018
Peugeot	208 II	2020
Peugeot	Partner	1999
Renault	Alaskan	2018
Renault	Kangoo	1999
Renault	Dokker	2018
Renault	Sandero	2016
Renault	Logan	2016
Sero electric	Cargo	2018
Sero electric	Sedan	2018
Shineray	T30 (assembled)	2021
Toyota	Hilux	1997
Toyota	Hilux SW4	2006
Volkswagen	Amarok	2009
Volkswagen	Taos	2020
VOLT Motors	e1	2020
VOLT Motors	w1	2020
VOLT Motors	z1	2020
Zanella	Z-Truck (assembled)	2021

== Discontinued models ==
Brand	Model	Period
Alcre	Luis Sport	1961-62
Alcre	Susana 500	1961-62
Anasagasti (Note: The Anasagasti was the first car to be ever produced in Argentina.)	Touring	1912-15
Autoar (Note: "Automotores Argentinos".)	Sedán	1959-63
Autoar	Panamericano	1958-62
Auto Union	1000	1960-70
Auto Union	Fissore Coupé	1963-70
Auto Union	Schnellaster Combi/Pickup/Minibus	1960-69
Auto Union	F1000 Combi/Pickup/Minibus	1969-79
Bambi	Bambi (Note: Local name given to German-origin Fuldamobil.)	1960-63
Borgward	Isabella Sedán/Coupé	1961-63
Borgward	B 611 utility	1960-63
CIDASA (Note: Company formed by the merging of Siam and IKA to continue the production of cars under the brands Riley, Morris and MG.)	Riley 1500 BM-611	1966-1967
CIDASA	Riley 1500 Pick Up	1966-67
CIDASA	Morris 1650 BM-612	1966-67
CIDASA	Morris 1650 Traveller	1966-67
CIDASA	MG 1650 BM-613	1966-67
Chrysler	(no name)	1932-194?
Chrysler	Valiant I-II-III-IV	1961-68
Chrysler	Dodge Polara/Coronado/GTX	1968-80
Chrysler	Dodge 1500 (Note: Commercialized under the Hillman marque in the UK, licensed to Chrysler in South America.)	1971-82
Cisitalia	750 Coupé/Spider	1960-63
Cisitalia	750 Spyder Abarth	1961-63
Cisitalia	850 Gran Sport Abarth	1961-63
Cisitalia	Bella Vista Week End	1961-62
Citroën	2CV/3CV	1960-90
Citroën	Ami 8	1970-82
Citroën	Méhari	1971-86
Citroën	C4L	2007-21
Crespi Automotive	Tulieta GT	1966-72
Deutz-Agrale	Dynamic	1992-97
Deutz-Agrale	Stark	1995-99
Dinarg	D-200	1961-64
Fiat	600	1960-82
Fiat	1100	1960-63
Fiat	1500 Sedan	1963-71
Fiat	1500 Coupé	1965-70
Fiat	1600	1969-72
Fiat	1600 Coupé	1970-73
Fiat	128/Europa/Súper Europa	1971-90
Fiat	133	1977-82
Fiat	125 Mirafiori	1975-82
Fiat	147/Spazio/Vivace	1981-96
Fiat	147 Fiorino	1989-97
Fiat	Regata	1985-95
Fiat	Duna	1987-2000
Fiat	Brio	1987-91
Fiat	Uno	1988-2000
Fiat	Palio	1996-2000 / 2010-2017
Fiat	Siena	1996-2000 / 2008-2017
Ford	Model T	1925-1927
Ford	Model A	1928-19??
Ford	F-100	1959-97
Ford	Falcon	1962-91
Ford	Fairlane	1969-82
Ford	Ranchero	1971-87
Ford	Taunus	1974-83
Ford	Sierra	1984-93
Ford	Escort	1988-2003
Ford	F-150	1987-97
Ford	Orion	1994-97
Ford	Focus	1999-2019
Chevrolet	Double Phantom	1925-19??
Chevrolet	400 (Note: Originally called "Nova" in the US.)	1962-1974
Chevrolet	Chevy	1969-78
Chevrolet	C-10 pickup	1960-78 (Note: Manufactured by General Motors Argentina until 1978 and then relaunched by Sevel Argentina which produced it from 1985 to 1991.)
Chevrolet	D-20 pickup	1993-97
Chevrolet	Silverado	1997-2000
Chevrolet	Corsa	1997-2016
Chevrolet	Agile	2009-2016
Chevrolet	Chevrolet Grand Vitara (Note: Commercialized under the brand Suzuki in other countries.)	2000-08
De Carlo	600 (Isetta 600/BMW 600)	1959-60
De Carlo	700 Glamour/SL (BMW 700)	1960-65
Opel	(no name)	1930-42
Opel	K 180 (Note: Manufactured by General Motors in Argentina.)	1974-78
Oldsmobile	(no name)	1927-42
Pontiac	(no name)	1928-42
Marquette	(no name)	1929-42
La Salle	(no name)	1929-42
Buick	(no name)	1929-42
Cadillac	(no name)	1929-42
Vauxhall	(no name)	1930-42
Goliath Hansa	Goliath 1100 / Hansa 1100	1960-61
Heinkel	Kabine	1961-65
Hispano-Argentina	H6	1930s
Honda	City	2011-15
Honda	HR-V	2015-20
IES (Note: Abbreviation for "Industrias Eduardo Sal Lari", an Argentine company that continued the production of model 3CV when Citroen left the country in the 1980s.)	3CV/América/Súper América/Carga/Gringo	1983-90
IKA (Note: The company had the license of many American brands such as Willys MB, Jeep, Kaiser and AMC. IKA also manufactured the first Renault cars in Argentina.)	Jeep (Note: Commercialized in the US under the Willys brand.)	1956-78
IKA	Jeep Gladiator	1963-67
IKA	Estanciera/Baqueano	1957-70
IKA	Kaiser Carabela (Note: Named after a type of Spanish sailing ship, only for Argentina.)	1958-62
IKA	Kaiser Bergantin	1960-62
IKA	Rambler Ambassador (Note: Manufactured in the US by American Motors Corporation (AMC).)	1965-72
IKA	Rambler Classic	1962-67
IKA	Torino (Note: Made under an agreement with American Motors Corporation (AMC) in 1966. The 1966 Torino was IKA's first integral national product. When the IKA factory was closed, Renault took the license to continue producing the Torino.)	1966-1982
Isard	T300 / T400	1959-65
Isard	T400 Sport	1960-61
Isard	Glas T700	1960-65
Isard	Glas 1204	1964-65
Iveco	Daily 49.10	1993-97
IAME	Justicialista Sedán/Gran Sport/Pick-Up/Furgón	1952-56
IAME	Justicialista Graciela (Note: It was the German Wartburg model in its country of origin, launched as an attempt to revive the marque.)	1956-64
IAME	Rastrojero pickup truck	1952-79
IAME	Rastrojero Conosur Sedán	1974-79
IAME	Rastrojero Frontal (van) (Note: The B611 by German Borgward.)	1969-79
IAME	Rastrojero Frontalito F71/SM81 (Note: The DKW van.)	1969-79
Mercedes-Benz	170 SV/SD	1953-55
Mercedes-Benz	220 D Pickup	1972-76
Mercedes-Benz	L 608 D	1969-1990
Mercedes-Benz	L 710	1990-1996
Mercedes-Benz	L 913	1990-1996
NSU	Prinz II-III	1959-63
Peugeot	403	1960-73
Peugeot	404	1962-80
Peugeot	504	1969-99
Peugeot	505	1981-95
Peugeot	405	1992-99
Peugeot	306	1996-2003
Peugeot	307	2005-10
Peugeot	207	2008-16
Peugeot	206	1999-2016
Peugeot	308	2012-19
Peugeot	408	2010-21
Renault	Dauphine/Ondine (Note: enault models prior to 1975 were produced under license by IKA.)	1960-70
Renault	Frégate	1960
Renault	4	1963-86
Renault	6	1969-84
Renault	12	1970-1994
Renault	18	1981-94
Renault	Fuego	1982-92
Renault	11	1984-95
Renault	Trafic	1986-2001
Renault	9	1987-96
Renault	21	1989-96
Renault	19	1992-2001
Renault	Mégane	1997-2009
Renault	Clio III	1996-2016
Renault	Fluence	2010-19
SEAT	Córdoba	2000-02
SEAT	Inca	1999-2002
Simca	Ariane	1965-67
Siam Di Tella (Note: All of its cars were produced under license of several British manufacturers.)	1500 (Note: Model under license of BMC.)	1959-66
Siam Di Tella	Magnette (Note: Model under license of MG.)	1963-66
Siam Di Tella	Argenta pickup l (Note: Model under license of Austin.)	1961-63
Siam Di Tella	Argenta pickup 2 (Note: Model under license of Riley.)	1963-66
Studebaker	Transtar	1960-62
Studebaker	Champ	1962-65
Volkswagen	VW 1500 (Note: The company continued the production of the model after Chrysler left the country in the 1980s.)	1982-90
Volkswagen	Gacel	1983-93
Volkswagen	Senda (Note: It was a 4-door version of the Gol model.)	1990-96
Volkswagen	Carat (Note: Originally named "Passat" in its country of origin.)	1987-91
Volkswagen	Kombi/Pickup/Panel Van	1981-90
Volkswagen	Gol	1993-2003
Volkswagen	Pointer	1994-97
Volkswagen	Polo	1996-2008
Volkswagen	Caddy	1996-2008
Volkswagen	Fox	2008-10
Volkswagen	Suran	2006-19
Volkswagen	Zunder 1500	1960-63

Note: Some manufacturers who made models under license are not identified.

== See also ==
- List of car models commercialized in Argentina
