= Puma (motorcycle) =

Argentinian motorcycle

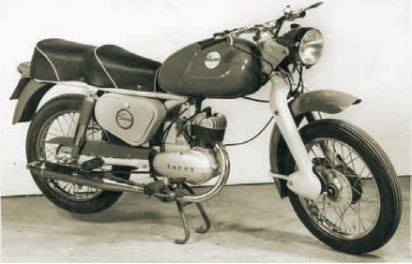
Puma Motorcycle. Fourth Series.

Puma, pumita, pumarola or pumasaki are the names given to a motorcycle created in Argentina in 1952. It became an emblem of Cordoba and a sign of the industrialization of the country's five-year plan. Made entirely by Argentine workers and with very accessible procurement plans, it quickly achieved popularity among the working classes. Its simple design and mechanical engineering made this motorcycle a symbol of the splendor of those days. Five series were presented, although the third only remained a prototype.

== History ==
Within the development plan of the automotive industry, on June 15, 1952 in the Technical Management of the Industrias Aeronáuticas y Mecánicas del Estado (a state entity and autarkic conglomerate of factories of the Argentine Republic created in 1951 to promote the manufacture of aircraft and automobiles) began the study of a low displacement and low price motorcycle to meet the demand of low-income sectors. Taking as a model a Guericke motorcycle with a 98 cc Sachs engine of German origin, which was a gift to President Perón from the UES (Unión de Estudiantes Secundarios), 20 motorcycles were made to determine the design tolerances. They were given to operators who had been involved in their construction for testing.

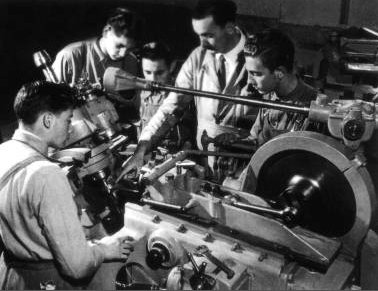
IAME was created to promote aircraft and automobile manufacturing in 1951.

This pre-series was painted in light green and beige instead of the characteristic black of the motorcycles of the time. Finally, in production, the well-known black frame with gray tank was chosen. The engineer Fernando Ariel Martín was in charge of this first part of the development.

This was done in some TIC barracks, small sheds of those used by the Americans during the war to establish their advanced camps and that Aeronautics had bought at a very low price. As for the definitive Factory, created by Decree 9170 of May 27, 1953, it was directed by Captain Juan José Tasso and was not in the limits of the I.A.M.E., but about two kilometers from there on the road to Villa Carlos Paz, province of Córdoba (Argentina), in the buildings that had housed the first battalion of paratroopers when they belonged to Aeronautics.

== Technical features ==
The first motorcycle had 2,309 parts, a two-stroke Sachs engine, 98 cc, two speeds (with lever on the tank), dual bicycle-type pedal starter, contrapedal rear brake and front brake with expandable skids and belt, 26" wheels, with front suspension and rigid rear frame.

Production exceeded 10,000 units and counting later series, until 1966, I.A.M.E. (Industrias Aeronáuticas y Mecánicas del Estado) and DINFIA (the name given to I.A.M.E. after 1956), built more than 100,000 motorcycles.

Production began at an average of 400 motorcycles per month, which were sold at 6500 pesos local currency (against 9500 pesos for a similar imported motorcycle), which explains the explosive growth in demand, which was soon not only covered by the industry led by José Ignacio San Martín, but also encouraged the emergence of numerous private factories that, in general, began as suppliers of motorcycle parts.

The firms Televel and Sequenza (Bromberg) were I.A.M.E.'s suppliers of 98 cc engines under I.A.M.E.'s specifications, but in reality they were practically, with very few modifications, Sachs engines.

It is not known exactly how many engines of each series each one supplied, but it is a very interesting circumstance that allowed the enormous development of the national motorcycle industry. The engineer Careta, co-owner of the firm Televel together with Calderoni, traveled to Germany and acquired the license of Fichtel & Sachs, with which, using the tooling developed for the State Aeronautical and Mechanical Industries, he was able to increase his production and sell the surplus in the market under his own brand, thus optimizing his management, but he sold them with such a small margin that he fixed their price at values that made the birth of competition difficult, but the possibility of market growth was made possible.

Televel thus became practically the supplier of all the motorcycle factories that emerged during those years in Argentina. Sequenza's main production was Bromberg sewing machines, which were manufactured in the Jeppener plant, in the district of Brandsen, province of Buenos Aires, which later became the headquarters of the Citroën factory.

The task of producing motorcycle frames was technically quite simple and the economic commitment was not very high, which together with the possibility of obtaining good quality engines at a reasonable price, made possible the emergence of a large number of factories throughout the country, with a rapid growth in the use of motorcycles, which allowed the rapid motorization of a vast sector of the community that had never had a vehicle.

== Historical context ==
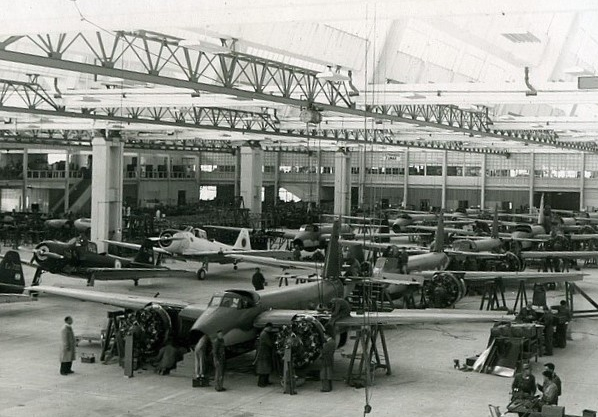
Military Aircraft Factory, Córdoba, 1950.

Since the mid-1930s Argentina had initiated a broad process of industrialization, basically centered in Buenos Aires and the textile and food industries. By the mid-1940s the industrial sector began to expand towards the metal-mechanic industry, with large iron and steel enterprises, such as Altos Hornos Hapla and the development of hydroelectric power plants, such as those installed in Córdoba, since the governorship of Amadeo Sabattini.

In this context, in the 1950s, precisely in the city of Córdoba, large metal-mechanical factories began to be installed for the production of engines, engines, locomotives and airplanes. Among them were the Fiat factory (1955), IKA (Industrias Kaiser Argentina – 1955) and the transformation of the Military Aircraft Factory into IAME (Industrias Aeronáuticas y Mecánicas del Estado) and then into DINFIA (Dirección Nacional de Fabricaciones e Investigaciones Aeronáuticas).

The economic transformation of Córdoba had a strong impact on the demographic composition of the city and from that moment on, it became one of the main industrial centers of the country.

At the beginning of the 1950s, it was evident that the Argentine industry, developed on the basis of import substitution, had serious problems in the heavy industry sector, particularly in the production of automobiles. While in 1950 only 3,000 automobiles had been imported, in 1951 the number jumped to 20,000. In view of the situation, President Juan Domingo Perón met with representatives of foreign automotive industries, expressing the country's interest in having factories for the production of automobiles. The businessmen, however, considered that Argentina was not yet ready for it and that it was convenient to continue importing elements to proceed to their assembly in the country, and perhaps to think about the national manufacture of some parts.

The initiative to set up an automotive pole in Córdoba came from the then Minister of Aeronautics, Brigadier Juan Ignacio San Martín, who had served as governor of Córdoba from 1949 to 1951, and had deepened the industrialist policies that the province had been promoting since the mid-1930s. Faced with the failure of the possibility of locating international automotive companies, Brigadier San Martín proposed to President Perón:

Sir, if you allow me, I am going to manufacture automobiles in the country.

As a result of this, the first Factory of Engines and Motors was created in Córdoba, later called Automobile Factory, until IAME was born, based on all the assets until then assigned to the Instituto Aerotécnico de Córdoba. Its factories were ten: airplanes, aircraft engines, jet engines, instruments and equipment, parachutes, propellers and accessories, machines and tools, automobiles, tractors and motorcycles.

The conglomerate adopted the legal form of an autarkic company, with a board of directors, a General Administration and Factory Administrations. The first board of directors was chaired by the aforementioned Brigadier Major Juan Ignacio San Martín. The funds came from a loan granted by the Banco Industrial de la República Argentina of $53,000,000, guaranteed by the State. The I.A.M.E. had 12,000 people in activity at that time.

Among the aircraft produced were the Pulqui II, defined as a jet-propelled defensive fighter that had its first flight on June 17, 1950. It reached a speed of 1040 km/h, with a ceiling of 15,100 m, five prototypes were produced. Later, in the history of the I.A.M.E., aircraft such as the Huanquero, Pandora, Constancia, Mentor, Querandí, Ranquel, Morane Saulnier, Guaraní II, Tehuelche, Urubú, Mamboretá, Pucará, Pampa, Cessna 150, Cessna 182 and Cessna 188 were manufactured.

The list of the automobiles manufactured is as follows: Sedan Institec, Rural Institec, Camioncito Institec, Rural Gauchita, Rastrojero Willys, Gran Sport without hood, Furgoncito Institec, Rastrojero Diésel, Sedan Graciela, Automóvil Sport 1954 with removable hood, Sport V8, Automóvil Sedan GW, Sport 1955 fixed hood, Sport 1955, Gran Sport V8, Cupe Gran Sport, Rural R63, Pick Up Cabure, Taxi T63, Chata acoplado and Ómnibus Savien.

The tractors were the Pampa and the Fiat, the Puma motorcycle was manufactured in 100, 125 and 200 cm^{3} displacement, in several series, and I.A.M.E. also ventured into motorboats, with racing, tourism and fishing boats, a portable boat, the Tero school sailboat, a Canadian canoe and the Surubí outboard motor.

The I.A.M.E. stage has a great success, which is stopped with the overthrow in 1955 of General Perón's constitutional government by the dictatorship called Revolución Libertadora. José Ignacio San Martín was removed from his position by the new government and moved to the United States, where he died in 1966.

== Models ==
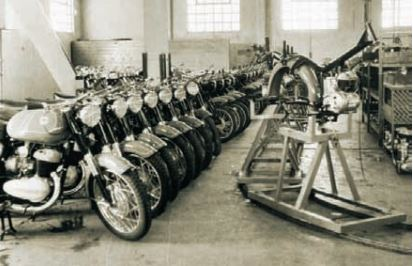
Assembly of Pumas in the store.

=== First series ===
With a displacement of 98cc, 2 speeds, and its unmistakable characteristic, the gearshift on the tank, start with dual bicycle type pedals, contrapedal rear brake and front brake with expandable skids and straps. It had only a single seat and no room for the passenger. It had a tool box in the lower part of the seat and a decompressor to stop the engine.

Production in numbers
	1952	1953	1954	1955	1956	Total
1st Series 98cc	20	229	2627	5573	1507	10,056

=== Second series ===
With a displacement of 98cc it began to be manufactured in 1956, by this time the gearshift was already as a pedal, and the rear brake was a rod, the tires changed from 26x2.00 to 26x2.25 in this series. Within this same series there were trivial modifications, such as the case of the decompressor that was replaced by an off button that was located under the headlight in the same line of the speedometer, which was also added in this model. Major changes can be noted with respect to the articulation of the frame and suspensions between this series and the first one.

Production in numbers
	1956	1957	1958	1959	1960	1961	1962	1963	Total
2nd Series 98cc	2637	12352	9006	11,694	13,577	5828	1294	540	56,928

=== Third series ===
Production was skipped due to internal factory issues, it remained in the prototype phase.

=== Fourth series ===
Born in 1959, like the second series, there were different models among the same series, the first batch came with a 98cc engine, although with 3 speeds, and then it started to be manufactured with 125cc engines. Unlike the previous series, it had a 16" wheel. The fork did not have telescopic suspension but it had a pair of connecting rods opposite to the line of the fork blades, making its ride smoother. It had a unified seat for two people.

Production in numbers
	1959	1960	1961	1962	1963	1964	1965	1966	Total
4th Series 98cc	149	2302	6051	2819	11				11,332
4th Series 125cc				5645	6236	6701	5641	1200	25,423

=== Fifth series ===
In 1963, due to the beginning of the privatizations and the fall of the achievements of Juan Domingo Perón, it did not have time to be produced in series, only a few units left the factory, it had an 18" wheel and a 200 cc engine.

Production in numbers
	1963	1964	1965	1966	Total
5th Series 200cc	99	745	530	562	1936

== See also ==
- Juan Perón
- Five-Year Plans of Argentina
- Industrias Aeronáuticas y Mecánicas del Estado
