= IAME Justicialista =

Institec Justicialista
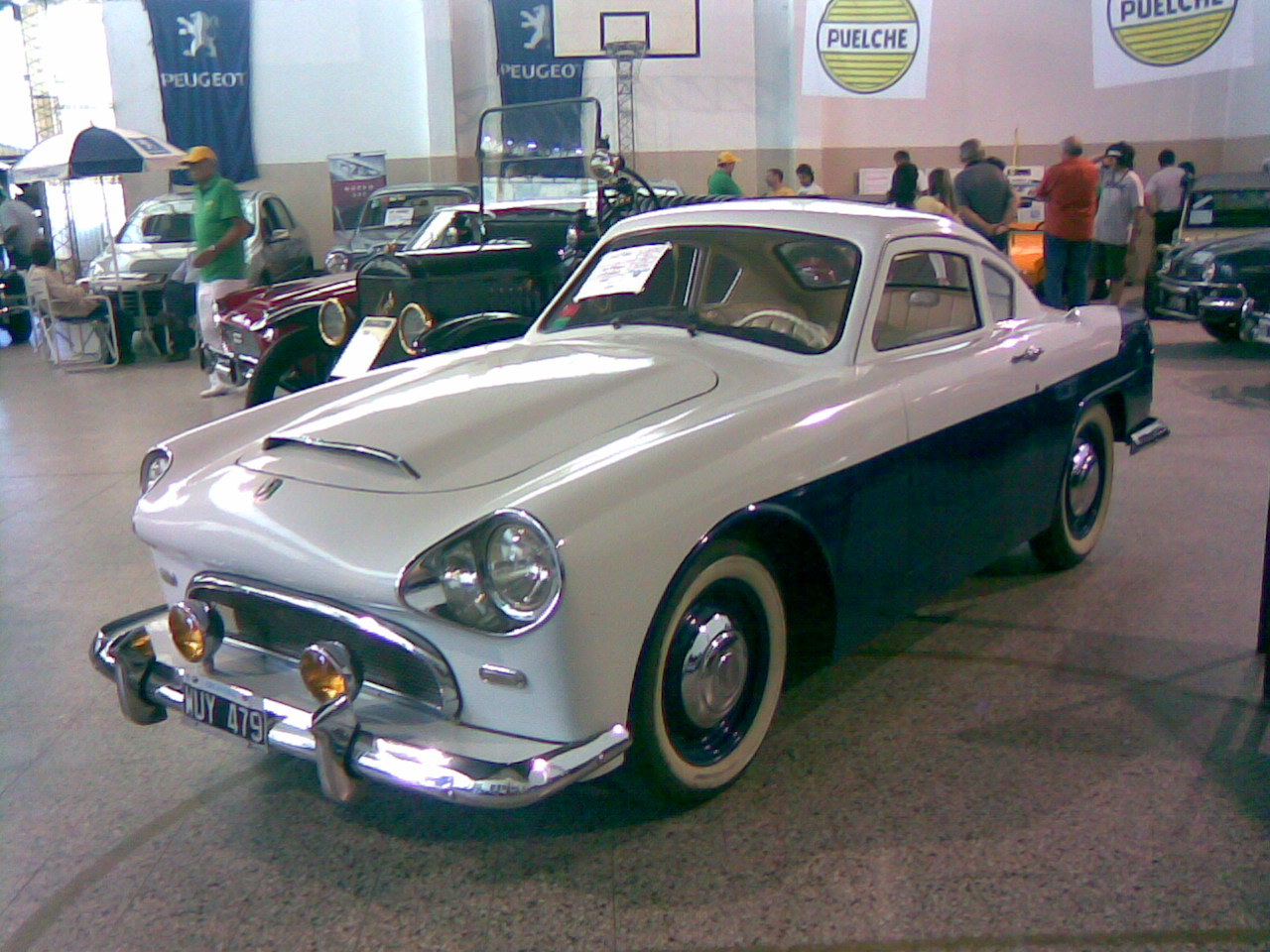

Overview
- Manufacturer: IAME
- Production: 1953–1955
- Assembly: Argentina: Córdoba

Body and chassis
- Body style: Sedan; Coupé; Roadster
- Layout: Front-engine, front-wheel-drive
- Related: Rastrojero; Rastrojero Conosur

Powertrain
- Engine: 800 cc two-stroke I4
- Transmission: 3-speed manual

Dimensions
- Wheelbase: 2,400 mm (94.5 in)
- Length: 4,295 mm (169.1 in)
- Curb weight: 850 kg (1,870 lb)

The Institec Justicialista was a line of cars produced by the government of Argentina via IAME (Industrias Aeronáuticas y Mecánicas del Estado) from 1954 to 1955 as an attempt to develop a native Argentine automotive industry. It used a front-engine, front-wheel-drive layout with a two-stroke two-cylinder engine derived from a German DKW design and a conventional metal body. Due to the insistence of General Juan Domingo Perón a sports car prototype was made, a two-seat version was showcase as roadster in the Paris Motor Show. The prototype was repurposed Porsche with a fiberglass body powered by a 1.5-liter air-cooled Porsche flat-four engine and a Porsche four-speed gearbox driving the front wheels.

When General Perón was overthrown in 1955, the project was abandoned. Mismanagement, poor sales and along with poor quality when compared to other locally produced cars lead to the quick disappearance of the Justicialista. It was later briefly revived as the short lived Wartburg-powered Graciela. Overall, the line was sparingly produced and had few sales.

== Development ==
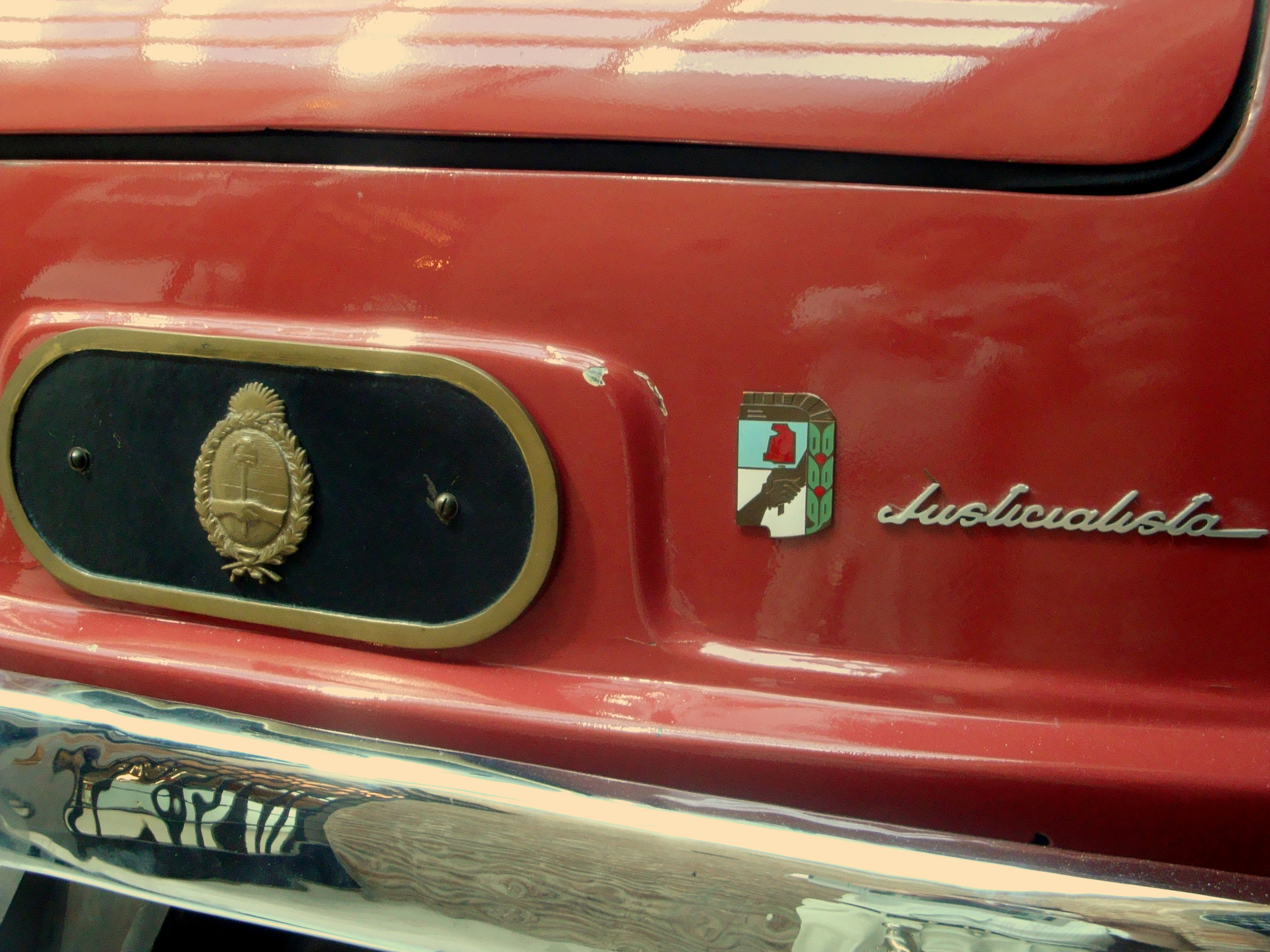
Detail of the vehicle's rear, with a "Justicialista" badge and a shield representing the Peronist Party

On the 30 of November 1949 the then President of the Argentine Nation Juan Domingo Perón signed a decree by which a military factory in Cordoba, until then used by the Navy, would be retooled for motor vehicle production.

Lacking any form of basic technical know-how and without the time or money for proper research and development, German DKW cars were bought from abroad and reverse engineered. The original DKW two-cylinder engine was deemed too small for larger cars and a two-stroke Puch V engine was proposed.

=== Production ===
From the beginning the Justicialista was designed as a more jingoistic alternative and marketed towards the middle class. The assembly lines were operated by workers with military backgrounds and the factory managers employed a military management approach, which rendered the factories as extensions of the barracks. Less than 200 units were allegedly produced, and it never became commercially available.

== Models ==
- Justicialista 800 Sedan (M800-powered)
- Justicialista Gran Turismo
- Justicialista van (Wartburg-powered)
- Justicialista truck
- Justicialista "Graciela" sedan (Wartburg-powered)
- Gauchita
- Justicialista Grand Sport (prototype; displayed at the Paris Motor Show)

== End of production ==
Very few cars were ever produced. Some sources claim to be able to determine the number of manufactured vehicles for some models, but factory production reports and sale figures were lost or non-existent. Modern examples are often hard to authenticate since more replicas were built later on by enthusiasts, often using surplus body parts with engines from other vehicles, other than those built by IAME.

In 1955, all Justicialista lines were discontinued. The assembly plant was sold to Porsche and renamed Teramo. Soon production began for the short lived Porsche Puntero local variant of the Porsche 356A.

== Technical ==
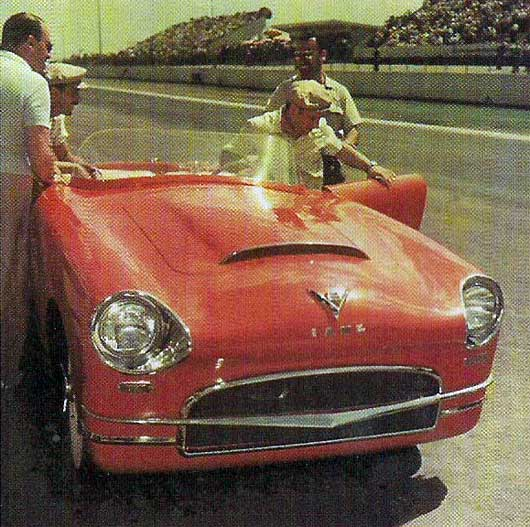
Juan Manuel Fangio driving the Institec Justicialista Grand Sport V8 at the Buenos Aires Autodromo

=== Engine (M800) ===
- 800 cc water-cooled two-stroke four-cylinder
- Bore and stroke: 48 x 56 mm
- 27 kW (36 hp) @ 4500 rpm
- 6.5:1 compression ratio
- Solex carburetors
- AC44 spark plugs

=== Transmission ===
- Multiple-disc clutch in oil bath
- Three-speed gearbox
- Helical-gear differential
- Floating-axis means

=== Chassis ===
- Chassis with rails for built in welded sheet drawer
- Independent front transverse leaf spring suspension with hairpin springs
- Independent rear torsion bar suspension, cross laminated with eight 5 mm thick sheets
- Double-action telescopic shock absorbers
- Hydraulic foot brake and mechanical handbrake
- Rack and pinion steering
- 3,25 x 16 disc wheel with pressed steel wheels 3.25 x 16
- 5.00 x 16 tires

=== Measurements ===
- 1200 mm front track
- 1250 mm rear track
- 5 m radio address
- 200 mm minimum above the floor light
- 35 L fuel capacity
- Naphtha consumption 7.8 L/100 km
- 120 km/h top speed

== See also ==
- IAME Rastrojero
- List of automobiles manufactured in Argentina
- Lists of automobile-related articles
- List of automobile manufacturers
