= Juan Marcos Angelini =

Argentinian car racer

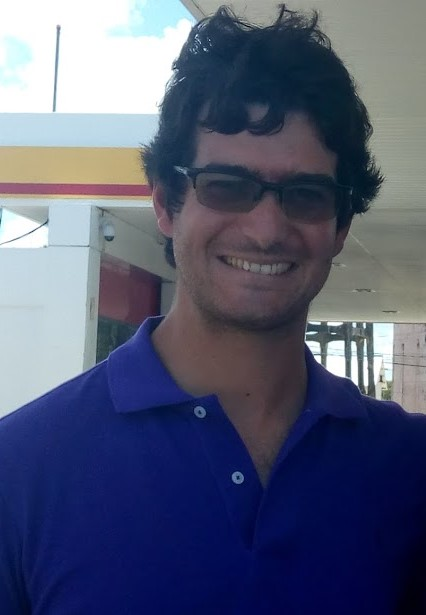
Juan Marcos Angelini in 2017.

Juan Marcos Angelini (Carreras, Province of Santa Fe, October 21, 1986 - Ibídem, September 23, 2018) was an Argentine motor racing driver. He competed in different motorsport championships in his country, highlighting his foray into the divisions of the Road Tourism Racers Association, where, in addition to being recognized as a reference for the Dodge brand, he was runner-up in TC Pista in 2007. After this title, he obtained promotion to Turismo Carretera, where he competed until his last days. During his time in this division, he managed to achieve three victories in his eleven-year career. His victory at the Autódromo Ciudad de Nueve de Julio in 2010 made him the 195th driver in the history of winners of the Turismo Carretera.

His beginnings took place in the Formula Renault Argentina, where in 2005 he was runner-up to Lucas Benamo, while he also knew how to venture into Class 3 of the National Tourism, where he competed in two stages, the first being a brief step in 2010 and the second between 2015 and 2016.

He died on September 23, 2018, as a result of a plane accident while testing a small plane he owned. His death occurred a month before his 32nd birthday.

== Sports career ==
| Season | Category | Equipment | Car | Careers | Victories | Podiums | Poles | VR | Points | Pos. |
|---|---|---|---|---|---|---|---|---|---|---|
| 2002 | Formula Renault Argentina | | Crespi-Renault | 11 | 1 | 1 | 0 | 0 | 35.00 | 13th |
| 2003 | Formula Renault Argentina | | Crespi-Renault | 14 | 1 | 1 | 0 | 0 | 50.00 | 9th |
| 2004 | Formula Renault Argentina | | Crespi-Renault | 14 | 3 | 5 | 4 | 2 | 105.00 | 4th |
| 2005 | Formula Renault Argentina | | Crespi-Renault | 14 | 3 | 6 | 3 | 5 | 120.00 | 2nd |
| 2006 | TC Pista | Spanish Power Team | Dodge Cherokee | 16 | 0 | 3 | 0 | 3 | 123.00 | 9th |
| 2007 | TC Pista | Spanish Power Team | Dodge Cherokee | 16 | 3 | 8 | 1 | 1 | 225.50 | 2nd |
| 2008 | Road Tourism | Spanish Power Team | Dodge Cherokee | 13 | 0 | 0 | 0 | 0 | 59.00 | 24th |
| 2009 | Road Tourism | Spanish Power Team | Dodge Cherokee | 3 | 0 | 0 | 0 | 0 | 38.50 | 36th |
| 2009 | Road Tourism | JC Competition | Chevrolet Chevy | 11 | 0 | 0 | 0 | 0 | 38.50 | 36th |
| 2009 | Road Tourism | Dole Racing | Torino Cherokee | 2 | 0 | 0 | 0 | 0 | 38.50 | 36th |
| 2010 | Road Tourism | UR Racing | Dodge Cherokee | 14 | 1 | 1 | 1 | 1 | 121.25 | 15th |
| 2010 | TC 4000 Standard Santafesino | Faín Competition | Ford Falcon | 1 | 0 | 0 | 0 | 0 | 0.00 | Inv. |
| 2011 | Road Tourism | UR Racing | Dodge Cherokee | 16 | 1 | 2 | 1 | 1 | 133.25 | 10th |
| 2011 | Class 3 of National Tourism | GC Competition | Ford Focus | 7 | 0 | 0 | 0 | 0 | 21.00 | 33rd |
| 2011 | TC Mouras Guest Tournament | CAR Racing | Dodge Cherokee | 3 | 0 | 0 | 0 | 0 | 4.50 | 23rd |
| 2012 | Road Tourism | UR Racing | Dodge Cherokee | 16 | 0 | 0 | 0 | 0 | 110.50 | 17th |
| 2013 | Road Tourism | UR Racing | Dodge Cherokee | 16 | 0 | 1 | 2 | 2 | 281.00 | 17th |
| 2013 | TC Mouras Guest Tournament | Álvarez Competition | Ford Falcon | 3 | 0 | 0 | 0 | 0 | 28.00 | 12th |
| 2014 | Road Tourism | UR Racing | Dodge Cherokee | 16 | 0 | 0 | 0 | 0 | 358.25 | 10th |
| 2014 | TC Mouras Guest Tournament | Canapino Sport | Chevrolet Chevy | 2 | 0 | 0 | 0 | 0 | 42.50 | 7th |
| 2014 | TC Mouras Guest Tournament | UR Racing | Dodge Cherokee | 1 | 0 | 0 | 0 | 0 | 42.50 | 7th |
| 2015 | Road Tourism | UR Racing | Dodge Cherokee | 16 | 1 | 2 | 0 | 0 | 329.75 | 12th |
| 2015 | Class 3 of National Tourism | UR Racing | Volkswagen Vento II | 5 | 0 | 0 | 0 | 1 | 29.00 | 33rd |
| 2016 | Road Tourism | UR Racing | Dodge Cherokee | 16 | 0 | 0 | 0 | 0 | 518.00 | 7th |
| 2016 | Class 3 of National Tourism | UR Racing | Volkswagen Vento II | 12 | 2 | 2 | 0 | 0 | 146.00 | 10th |
| 2017 | Road Tourism | UR Racing | Dodge Cherokee | 15 | 0 | 0 | 0 | 0 | 310.50 | 18th |
| 2017 | TC Mouras Guest Tournament | Martínez Competition | Ford Falcon | 3 | 1 | 1 | 0 | 0 | 47.50 | 10th |
| 2018 | Road Tourism | Corven UR Racing | Dodge Cherokee | 10 | 0 | 1 | 0 | 0 | 221.00 | 29th |
| 2018 | TC Mouras Guest Tournament | Pana Sport | Dodge Cherokee | 4 | 1 | 2 | 1 | 1 | 54.00 | 10th |

=== Victories in Road Tourism ===
| Race # | Date | Circuit | Competition | Automobile |
|---|---|---|---|---|
| 1110 | 05 | Ciudad de Nueve de Julio | Plusmar Grand Prix | Dodge Cherokee |
| 1123 | 03 | City of Rafaela | SpeedAgro Grand Prix | Dodge Cherokee |
| 1187 | 12 | Termas de Rio Hondo | Thermae Grand Prix, Final B | Dodge Cherokee |

- Total: 3 victories between 2010 and 2018

=== TC 2000 ===
| Year | Equipment | Car | 1 | 2 | 3 | 4 | 5 | 6 | 7 | 8 | 9 | 10 | 11 | 12 | 13 | 14 | 15 | 16 | 17 | 18 | 19 | 20 | Results | Points |
|---|---|---|---|---|---|---|---|---|---|---|---|---|---|---|---|---|---|---|---|---|---|---|---|---|
| 2017 | Riva Racing | Peugeot 408 I | AG I | | BA I | | CDU | | PAR I | | RC | | BA II | SL | | PAR II | | AG II | SMM | CON | | BA III | - | (Note: Ineligible from scoring points as Angelini was an invited guest) |
| 2017 | Riva Racing | Peugeot 408 I | | | | | | | | | | | Retired (Note: Guest of Richard Rolando.) | | | | | | | | | | - | - |

== Champions ==
| Título | Categoría | Marca | Año |
|---|---|---|---|
| Subcampeón | (Argentina) Fórmula Renault 1.6 | Crespi-Renault | 2005 |
| Subcampeón | (Argentina) TC Pista | Dodge Cherokee | 2007 |
