= FMA IA 50 Guaraní II =

1963 Argentine utility aircraft

IA 50 Guarani II
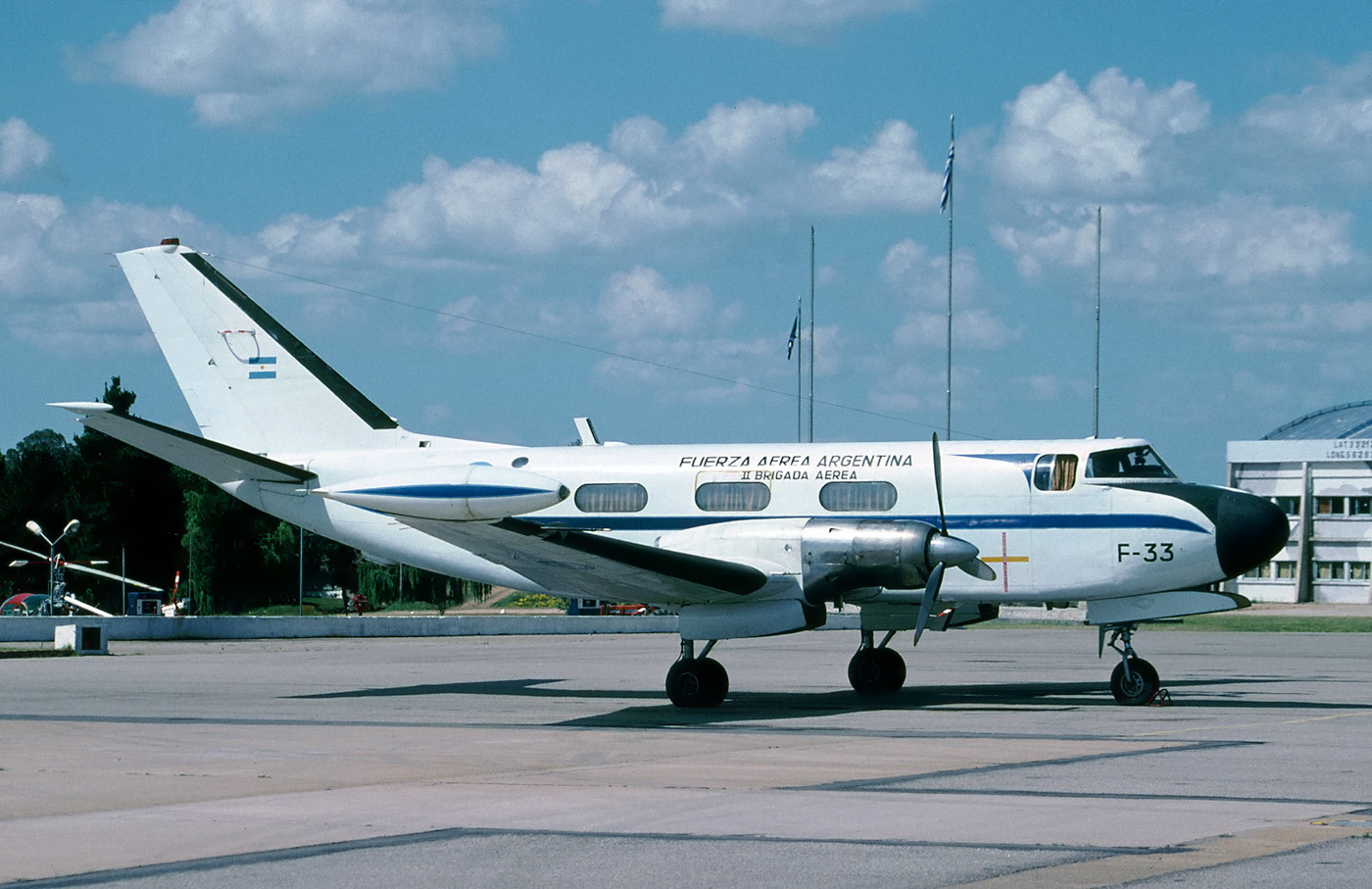

General information
- Type: Multi-purpose aircraft
- National origin: Argentina
- Manufacturer: Fabrica Militar de Aviones (FMA)
- Status: Retired
- Primary user: Fuerza Aérea Argentina
- Number built: 3 prototypes + 32 series aircraft

History
- Introduction date: 1966
- First flight: 26 April 1963
- Retired: 7 January 2007
- Developed from: IAe 35 Huanquero

The I.A. 50 Guaraní II is an Argentine utility aircraft designed at the DINFIA (successor to the "Instituto Aerotecnico" - AeroTechnical Institute) in the early 1960s.

== Design and development ==
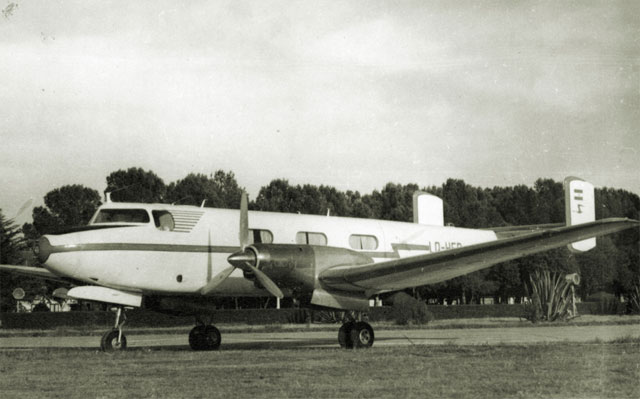
The FMA Guaraní I

In the early 1960s, the Argentine state aviation conglomerate, DINFIA, realised that its IA 35 Huanquero twin-piston engined light transport was becoming outdated, and it was decided to develop a turboprop-engined derivative. While of similar layout to the Huanquero, with both aircraft being twin-engined low-wing monoplane of all metal construction with a twin tail, the new aircraft, the Guaraní, shared only 20% of the structure of the Huanquero. It was powered by two Turbomeca Bastan III engines each rated at 850 shaft horsepower (630 kW). It first flew on 6 February 1962.

The aircraft was further developed as the Guaruani II; the main difference being a single swept fin and a shortened rear fuselage. It also used more powerful (930 shaft horsepower (690 kW)) Bastan VIA engines. The fuselage was semi-monocoque with a squared cross-section, having unswept wings and swept tailplanes. The prototype Guaraní was rebuilt to this standard and flew in this form on 26 April 1963.

== Operational history ==
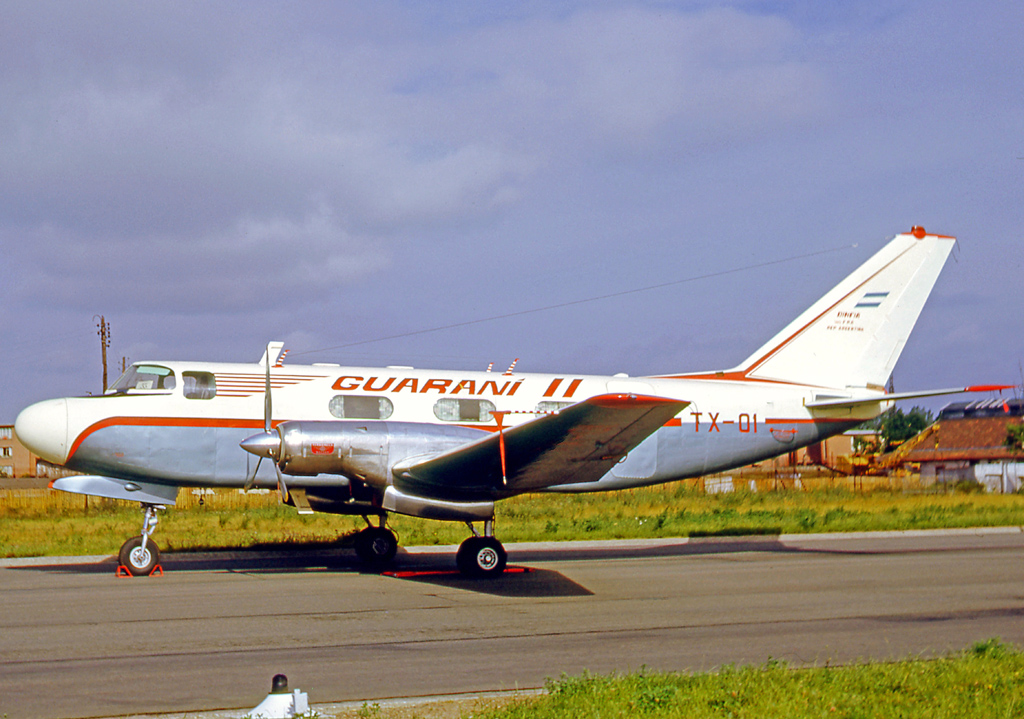
The prototype Guarani II on exhibit at the 1965 Paris Air Salon

In June 1965 the Guarani II prototype (serial number TX-01) was exhibited and flown at the Paris Air Show at Le Bourget Airport, France). TX-01 was later flown to the CEV (“Centre d’Essays en Vol”, Air Test Centre) at Istres, France, for technical evaluation, where it was tested for a total of 200 flying hours. It was flown back to the FMA, Argentina in February 1966, being the first Latin American-built aircraft to fly across the Atlantic Ocean.

The last flying example was retired on 7 January 2007 at the II Brigada Aérea (IInd Air Brigade), at Paraná, Entre Rios, Argentina and made its last flight to the National Aeronautics Museum ("Museo Nacional de Aeronáutica") of the Argentine Air Force (Fuerza Aérea Argentina), at Morón, Buenos Aires, Argentina where it was placed on display.

== Operators ==
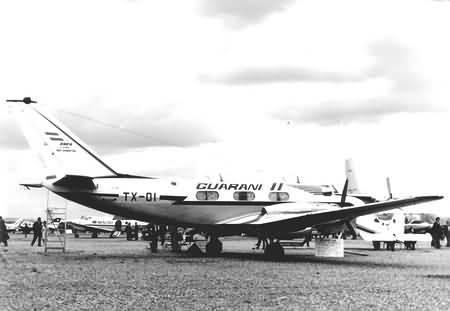
I.A. 50 Guarani II at the 1966 Paris Air Show

- Argentine Air Force
- Argentine Federal Police - One operated 1970–1981.
- Argentine Navy
  - Argentine Naval Aviation
- Servicio Penitenciario Federal
- Líneas Aéreas Provinciales de Entre Ríos
- Government of Córdoba
- Government of Salta
- Ministry of National Welfare

== Surviving aircraft ==
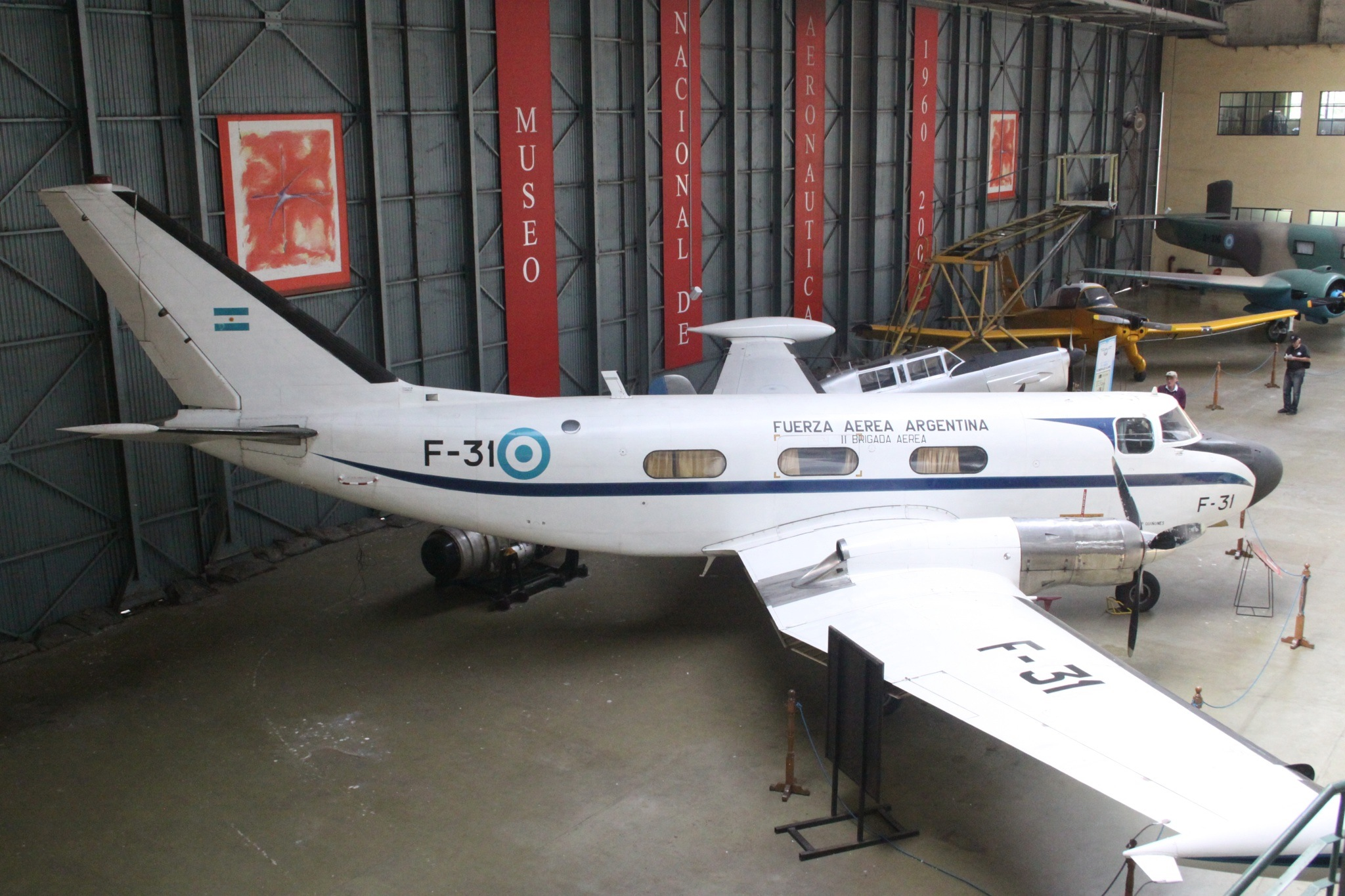
Preserved aircraft at Museo Nacional de Aeronáutica

- F-31 – Last operational G-II, retired in 2006, at the Museo Nacional de Aeronáutica de Argentina ("National Aeronautics Museum")
- F-35 – G-II on display at the Second Air Brigade in Paraná, Entre Ríos.
- LQ-JXY – Penitentiary Service G-II, at the Museo Nacional de Aeronáutica de Argentina ("National Aeronautics Museum")
- LV-LAE – G-II on display at the Ciudad de Paraná Aeroclub in Paraná, Entre Rios.
- T-126 – G-II on display near Hernán Pujato Viewpoint in Diamante, Entre Ríos.

== Specifications (IA 50) ==
Data from Jane's All The World's Aircraft 1965-66

General characteristics

- Crew: 2
- Capacity: 15 passengers
- Length: 14.86 m (48 ft 9 in)
- Wingspan: 19.53 m (64 ft 1 in)
- Height: 5.81 m (19 ft 1 in)
- Wing area: 41.81 m^{2} (450.0 sq ft)
- Aspect ratio: 9:1
- Airfoil: NACA 63_{3}218
- Empty weight: 3,924 kg (8,651 lb)
- Max takeoff weight: 7,120 kg (15,697 lb)
- Powerplant: 2 × Turbomeca Bastan VI-A turboprops, 690 kW (930 shp) each

Performance

- Maximum speed: 500 km/h (310 mph, 270 kn)
- Cruise speed: 450 km/h (280 mph, 240 kn) (econ cruise)
- Stall speed: 145 km/h (90 mph, 78 kn)
- Never exceed speed: 515 km/h (320 mph, 278 kn)
- Range: 1,995 km (1,240 mi, 1,077 nmi) with max payload
- Service ceiling: 12,500 m (41,000 ft)
- Rate of climb: 13.4 m/s (2,640 ft/min)

== See also ==
- Tucán T-3

Comparable aircraft

- Embraer EMB 110 Bandeirante
- Dassault M.D.320 Hirondelle
