= DINFIA IA 35 =

IA 35 Huanquero
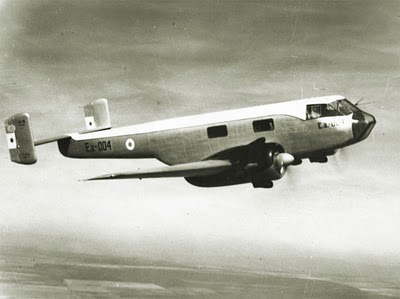

General information
- Type: Twin-engine utility aircraft
- Manufacturer: DINFIA
- Designer: Kurt Tank
- Primary user: Argentine Air Force
- Number built: 50+

History
- Introduction date: 1957
- First flight: 1953 (21 September 1953)

The DINFIA IA 35 Huanquero was a 1950s Argentine twin-engined general-purpose monoplane aircraft built by the DINFIA.

== Development ==
The IA 35 Huanquero was the first aircraft design from the DINFIA organisation (Argentina) to enter production. A twin-engined all-metal (except for fabric-covered ailerons) low-wing cantilever monoplane, it had a high-mounted tailplane with two fins and rudders and retractable tricycle landing gear. It was powered by two I.Ae. 19R El Indio radial engines.

The design team was led by professor Kurt Tank, former Focke-Wulf designer who also designed the Pulqui II jet fighter based on the Focke-Wulf Ta 183 of the World War II era.

The prototype first flew on 21 September 1953 and was followed by a planned production batch of 100 aircraft. The first production aircraft flew on 29 March 1957 but less than half of the aircraft were built when production ceased in the mid-1960s.

== Variants ==
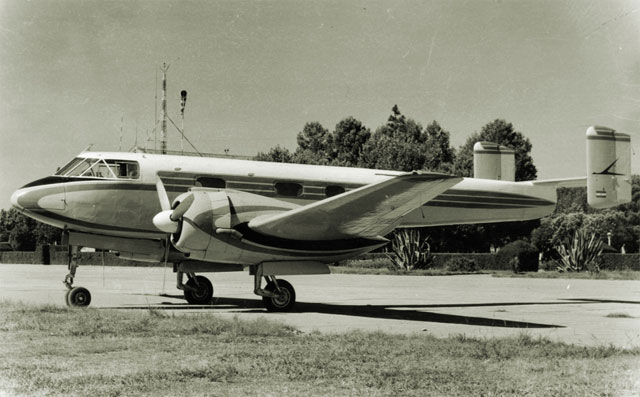
Pandora prototype

IA 35 Type 1A
Advanced instrument or navigation trainer, powered by two IA 19R El Indio radial engines.
IA 35 Type 1B
Bomber version of the Type 1A, armed with 2x 12.7 mm (0.500 in) Browning machine guns, racks for bombs up to 100 kg (220.462 lb) and rails for 4x rockets underwing.
IA 35 Type 1U
Bombing and gunnery trainer, powered by two 750hp (559kW) IA 19SR1 El Indio radial engines.
IA 35 Type II
Light transport version with a crew of three and seven passengers, powered by two IA 19R El Indio radial engines.
IA 35 Type III
Air ambulance version with a crew of three and four stretchers with attendants, powered by two IA 19R El Indio radial engines.
IA 35 Type IV
Photographic reconnaissance version with crew of three and camera operator, powered by two IA 19R El Indio radial engines.
IA 35-X-III Pandora
Civil transport version with room for ten passengers, powered by two 750hp (559kW) IA 19SR1 El Indio radial engines.
IA Constancia II
initial designation of the Guarani I, with Turbomeca Bastan turboprops.
IA 35 Guarani I
IA 50 Guarani II

== Surviving aircraft ==
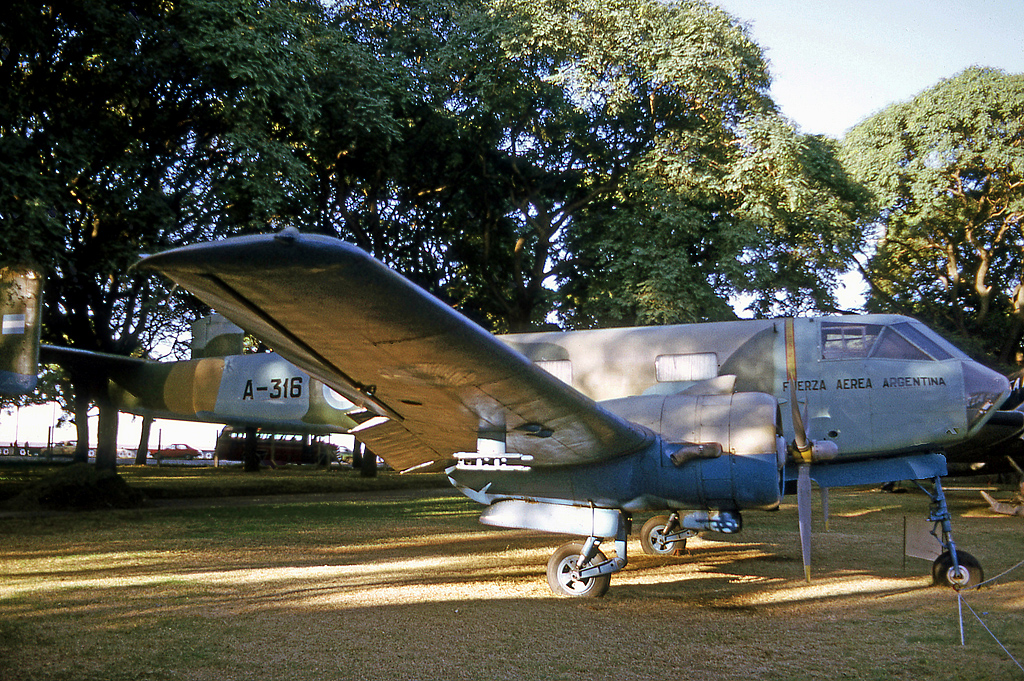
IA 35 Huanquero A-316 preserved at Museo Nacional de Aeronautica

- Huanquero A-316 (ex-Argentine Air Force) is preserved at the Museo Nacional de Aeronautica, Morón, Buenos Aires, Argentina.
- Huanquero A-320 (ex-Argentine Air Force) is preserved at the Second Air Brigade in Paraná, Entre Ríos, Argentina.

== Operators ==
Argentina
Argentine Air Force

== Specifications (IA 35 Type 1A) ==
Data from Jane's All The World's Aircraft 1961–62

General characteristics

- Crew: 8 (pilot, co-pilot, radio operator, instructor and four pupils)
- Length: 13.98 m (45 ft 10 in)
- Wingspan: 19.6 m (64 ft 4 in)
- Wing area: 42 m^{2} (450 sq ft)
- Aspect ratio: 9:1
- Airfoil: root: NACA 63_{3}-218; tip: NACA 63_{1}-212
- Empty weight: 3,500 kg (7,716 lb)
- Gross weight: 5,700 kg (12,566 lb)
- Fuel capacity: 1,200 L (317 US gal; 264 imp gal) in two wing tanks, with provision for a 650 L (172 US gal; 143 imp gal)
- Powerplant: 2 × I.Ae. 19R El Indio 9-cylinder air-cooled radial engines, 460 kW (620 hp) each
- Propellers: 3-bladed Rotol Type RA 25826 controllable-pitch propellers

Performance

- Maximum speed: 362 km/h (225 mph, 195 kn) at 3,000 m (9,800 ft)
- Cruise speed: 320 km/h (200 mph, 170 kn) at 3,000 m (9,800 ft) (econ cruise)
- Range: 1,570 km (980 mi, 850 nmi) maximum internal fuel
- Endurance: 4 hours 40 minutes (7 hours 40 minutes with auxiliary tanks)
- Service ceiling: 6,400 m (21,000 ft)
- Absolute ceiling: 6,600 m (21,700 ft)
- Rate of climb: 5 m/s (980 ft/min)

== See also ==
- Fábrica Militar de Aviones

Related development

- FMA IA 50 Guaraní II

== Bibliography ==
- Bridgman, Leonard, ed. (1959). Jane's All the World's Aircraft 1959–60. London: Sampson Low, Marston & Co. Ltd.
- Cortet, Pierre (July 2000). "Rétros du Mois" [Retros of the Month]. Avions: Toute l'Aéronautique et son histoire (in French). No. 88. p. 4. ISSN 1243-8650.
- Magnusson, Michael (Summer 2009). "FMA: from 1945: The story of Fabrica Militar de Aviones, Argentina: Part 7". Air-Britain Archive. pp. 63–68. ISSN 0262-4923.
- Ogden, Bob (2008). Aviation Museums and Collections of the rest of the World. Tonbridge, Kent, UK: Air-Britain (Historians) Ltd. ISBN 978-0-85130-394-9.
- Taylor, John W. R., ed. (1965). Jane's All the World's Aircraft 1965-66. London: Sampson Low, Marston.
- The Illustrated Encyclopedia of Aircraft (Part Work 1982–1985), 1985, Orbis Publishing
