= Zunder 1500 =

Overview
- Manufacturer: Industrias del Transporte Automotor
- Production: 1960-1963: 142 built
- Assembly: Argentina: Córdoba
- Designer: Emil Rufilius

Body and chassis
- Class: Compact car
- Body style: 2-door saloon; 2-door coupé (prototype only
- Layout: Rear-engine, rear-wheel-drive layout
- Related: Porsche 356; Volkswagen Karmann Ghia

Powertrain
- Engine: 1498 cc H4 (Petrol)
- Transmission: 4-speed manual transaxle

Dimensions
- Wheelbase: 2,400 mm (94.5 in)
- Length: 4,320 mm (170.1 in)
- Width: 1,540 mm (60.6 in)
- Curb weight: 880 kg (1,940 lb)

The Zunder, which means "tinder" in German, was a passenger car produced by the Argentine company Industrias del Transporte Automotor between 1960 and 1963.

== History and description ==
The Zunder 1500 was an attempt by Nelson José and Eligio Bongiovanni to take advantage of the growing demand for cheap and widely available means of transportation in Argentina. Owning a car factory in Córdoba, they set out to build their own unique car in 1960. Under the direction of engineer Emil Rupilius a small 2-door saloon was created, based around a Porsche-sourced drivetrain. This affiliation with Porsche was later used in an advertising campaign.

The body of the 1500 was made of plastic resulting in a kerb weight of only 880 kg. It was distinguished by the characteristic oblique arrangement of the headlights and negatively tilted C-pillars resulting in a wrap-around rear windscreen. The rear-engine, rear-wheel drivetrain consisted of a 4-speed transaxle mated to a 1.5 L overhead valve flat-4 engine from the Porsche 356. Developing 57 bhp, it was able to propel the 1500 to a maximum speed of 150 km/h (93 mph).

The 1500 premiered in September, 1960 during a gala at the Alvear Palace Hotel. A coupé variant, very similar in appearance to the Volkswagen Karmann Ghia, was also unveiled during the gala. Soon after deliveries of the Zunder sedan began. However, the coupé did not go beyond the prototype stage.

A total of about 200 cars were built. The creation of a sales and service network exceeded the financial capabilities of the company, leading to its demise in 1963.

== Specifications ==
=== Engine ===
- Manufacturer: Porsche
- Layout: flat-four
- Cooling: air-cooled
- Valve train: pushrod OHV, 2 valves per cylinder
- Displacement: 1488 cc
- Bore × stroke: 80.00 mm x 74.00 mm
- Compression ratio: 7.0:1
- Fuel delivery: 1 Solex 32 BPL carburettor
- Maximum power output: 58 hp (43 kW) at 4800 rpm

=== Performance ===
- Maximum speed: 150 km/h (93 mph)

=== Braking system ===
- Front: drums
- Rear: drums

=== Dimensions and weight ===
- Wheelbase: 2,400 mm (94.5 in)
- Length: 4,320 mm (170.1 in)
- Width: 1,540 mm (60.6 in)
- Height: 1,490 mm (58.7 in)
- Curb weight: 880 kg (1,940 lb)
