= IAME Rastrojero Conosur =

Rastrojero Conosur
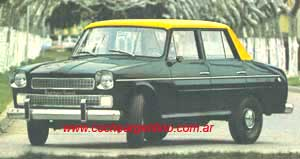

Overview
- Manufacturer: IAME
- Production: 1974–1979
- Assembly: Argentina: Córdoba
- Designer: Jose Lampon Santiago

Body and chassis
- Body style: 4-door sedan
- Layout: Front engine, rear-wheel drive
- Related: IAME Rastrojero

Powertrain
- Engine: 124 cu in (2.03 L) Indenor XD2 I4; 1,946 cc (118.8 cu in) diesel
- Power output: 68 hp (51 kW) (diesel)
- Transmission: 4-speed Borgward manual

Dimensions
- Wheelbase: 2,680 mm (105.5 in)
- Length: 4,390 mm (172.8 in)
- Width: 1,730 mm (68.1 in)
- Height: 1,630 mm (64.2 in)
- Curb weight: 1,150 kg (2,535 lb)

The Rastrojero Conosur is a passenger car that was based on the utilitarian, second-generation Rastrojero Diesel. It is a 4-door sedan especially designed for use in taxi fleets. This car was built by the state enterprise State Mechanical Industries, of Argentina, from 1974 until 1979, when they ended the operations of this factory.

The car was aesthetically similar to a Rastrojero Diesel double cab, but instead of a cargo box, the vehicle consists of a trunk designed with a small slope. This left aside the straight line of the box of the original model.

As far as its mechanics are concerned, the Rastrojero Conosur was the same as the pickup. A 4.88 Indenor XD engine 1,946 cc (118.8 cu in) that delivers an output of 60 hp (45 kW; 61 PS), powered by diesel oil through an indirect injection system Bosch EP / VA, all coupled to a 4-speed Borgward gearbox.

Its production, along with all Rastrojero vehicles, ended on May 22, 1979. The Rastrojero Conosur was mainly designed for use as a taxi. However, some Rastrojero Conosurs tend to be restored not as taxis, but as private vehicles.

== See also ==
- IAME (State Aeronautical and Mechanical Industries)
- IAME Rastrojero
- List of cars manufactured in Argentina
- Lists of automobiles
- List of automobile manufacturers
