= Sero electric =

Argentine car company

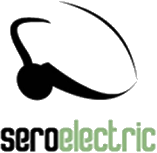
- Industry: Automotive
- Founded: 2010; 16 years ago
- Founder: Pablo Naya
- Headquarters: Buenos Aires, Argentina
- Key people: Pablo Naya (CEO)
- Products: Electric vehicles
- Website: sseroelectric.com

Sero electric is an Argentine electric microcar manufacturer based in Buenos Aires, founded in 2010.

== History ==
Sero electric was founded in Buenos Aires in 2010 by Pablo Naya with the goal of developing and producing the first locally-built electric car in the Argentine automotive industry. The inspiration for Sero vehicles was the observation of the dynamically developing market of electric microcars in Europe at the turn of the first and second decades of the 21st century. The amount of USD 4 million was used to implement the project, and its implementation began in 2015.

Work on the first Sero electric vehicle was completed in 2019, when the family of microcars with passenger-delivery characteristics was officially presented in September, with prices starting at US$9,000. The Sero Sedan was built for civil use, while the Cargo, available as a pickup or van, was built for commercial use. In February 2021, Sero Electric established cooperation with the Brazilian company Movi Electric, which started the production of the Sero model line in this country for the dynamically developing market in Brazil.

== Vehicles ==
- Sedan
- Cargo
