= Tulieta GT =

Motor vehicle manufactured in 1977

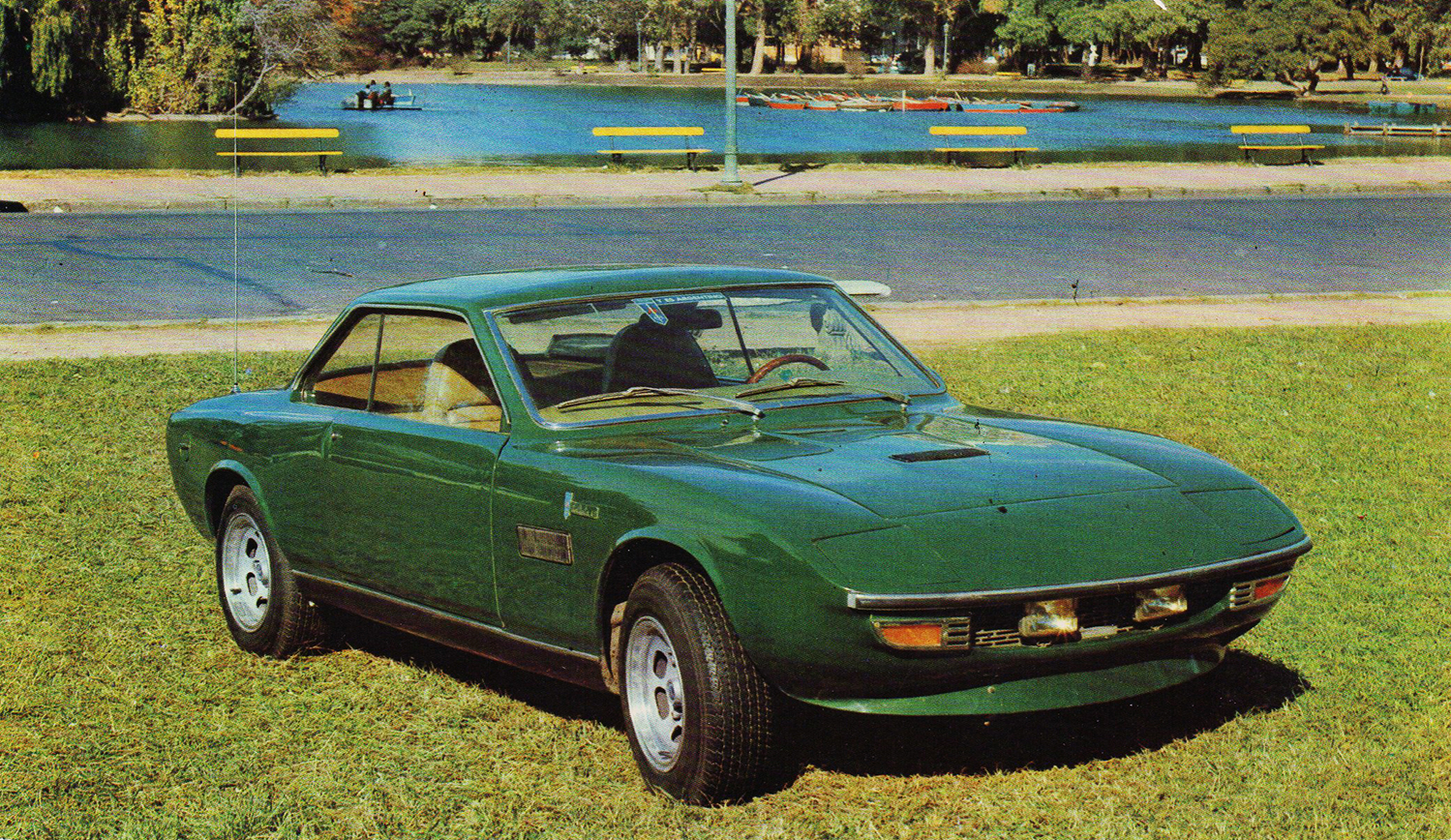
Tulieta GT

The Tulieta GT was an Argentinean coupé manufactured by Crespi only in 1977.

== Background ==
At the beginning of the seventies he began to build an extraordinary building in his workshop on Santos Dumont Street in the Chacarita, of Buenos Aires. He did it on the platform of a standard Renault 4 sold by the then IKA-Renault, and later Renault Argentina.

In principle, the 1.1 liter Renault 6 engine was used, but as time went by, the M1400 engine began to be fitted, the same one used by the Renault 12 and which the Renault 4 and 6 also carried at different times. The engine It was the well-known in-line four-cylinder with a displacement of 1,397 cubic centimeters.

The rest of the mechanics were also Renault and so much so that at the end of the seventies they had closed a deal with Renault Argentina to produce about 50 to 60 units per month with the support of the French brand.
