= Sero Sedan =

Electric microcar

Overview
- Manufacturer: Sero electric
- Also called: Movi Sedan; Movi Baú; Movi Carga
- Production: 2019–present
- Assembly: Argentina: Castelar; Brazil: Toledo

Body and chassis
- Class: L6(b) / L7(b) microcar
- Body style: 2-door coupé; 2-door panel van; 2-door pickup truck
- Layout: Front-engine, front-wheel-drive

Powertrain
- Electric motor: Single motor

Dimensions
- Wheelbase: 1,180 mm (46 in)
- Length: 2,350 mm (93 in) (Sedan); 2,700 mm (106 in) (Cargo)
- Width: 1,320 mm (52 in)
- Height: 1,560 mm (61 in)

The Sero Sedan is an electric microcar produced and marketed by Sero electric since 2019.

== History ==
After securing the necessary amount of USD 4 million for the development and implementation of a proprietary electric microcar structure, Sero started a 4-year construction process in 2015, the results of which were presented in September 2019. The design of the Sero model family has been simplified to a minimum for low cost and low overall weight. Apart from the body made of plastic, the car has neither airbags, ABS, nor ESP system. According to South American legislation, only seat belts are required in this type of vehicle.

As of 2017, it contains 85% Argentine parts.

Sales of the Sero Sedan and its variants began in the second half of 2019, initially covering only the domestic Argentine market. In 2020, Sero Electric established cooperation with the Brazilian startup Movi Electric, which launched the production of Sero models under its own brand in the same year.

== Cargo ==
The range of body variants, apart from the passenger sedan, also includes a wide range of vans from the Sero Cargo series. It consists of models with a box body, which can take the form of both a pickup and a panel van.

=== Variants ===
- Sero electric Cargo Alto
- Sero electric Cargo Bajo Largo
- Sero electric Cargo Bajo Furgón

== Specifications ==
The Sedan is powered by a 10.8 HP electric motor, which allows for a maximum speed of 45 km/h. The range of the vehicle on a single charge under optimal conditions while driving in the city is approximately 65 kilometers, while charging from a household socket takes up to a full 7 hours.

== Safety ==
It has front disc brakes and rear drum brakes.
