= Crespi Automotive =

Argentine automobile manufacturer

Crespi Competición
- Type: Private
- Industry: Automotive
- Founded: 1962; 64 years ago
- Founder: Tulio Crespi
- Headquarters: Balcarce, Buenos Aires, Argentina
- Products: Automobiles; Formula racing vehicles
- Owner: Tulio Crespi
- Website: tuliocrespi.com

Tulio Crespi S.A. (trade name: Crespi Competición) is an Argentine automobile manufacturer, founded in 1962 by Tulio Crespi (June 22, 1938 – September 22, 2026), a former racing driver. With an industrial plant in Balcarce, Buenos Aires, Crespi has been producing automobiles and Formula racing vehicles.

Crespi made significant contributions for Formula Renault 2.0 (building many chassis for former Formula 4) and Argentine Turismo Carretera. Its sports cars included models Tulio and Tulieta, both exhibited at the 1975 Paris Motor Show, the first time an Argentine manufacturer participated in the biennial. In the last years, the company expanded its products line to mini truck vehicles.

== History ==
Tulio Crespi started his career as racing car constructor, making his first steps in "Fórmula Mini Junior", where he also had good performances as a driver. In mid 1960s he made cars for open-wheel racing car category Formula 4.

In 1967, racer Nasif Estéfano crashed his Torino in the Autódromo de Buenos Aires, destroying it completely. The destroyed car was taken to the Crespi's workshop in barrio of Chacarita. Estéfano commissioned Crespi to rebuild the car with a new design that fitted Turismo Carretera rules. The remodelled car was named "Petiso". Its success in subsequent competitions encouraged Crespi to build a limited-series of that car.

The first sedan built by Crespi, inspired by a Maserati Ghibli seen by him during a trip to Europe with TC drivers, was named "Tulia". The prototype was finished in mid-1969 and featured in the Rural Exhibition that same year. The Tulia reached a top speed of 230 km/h. During its first three years of production, 10 units were sold. It is believed that a total of 30 units were produced.

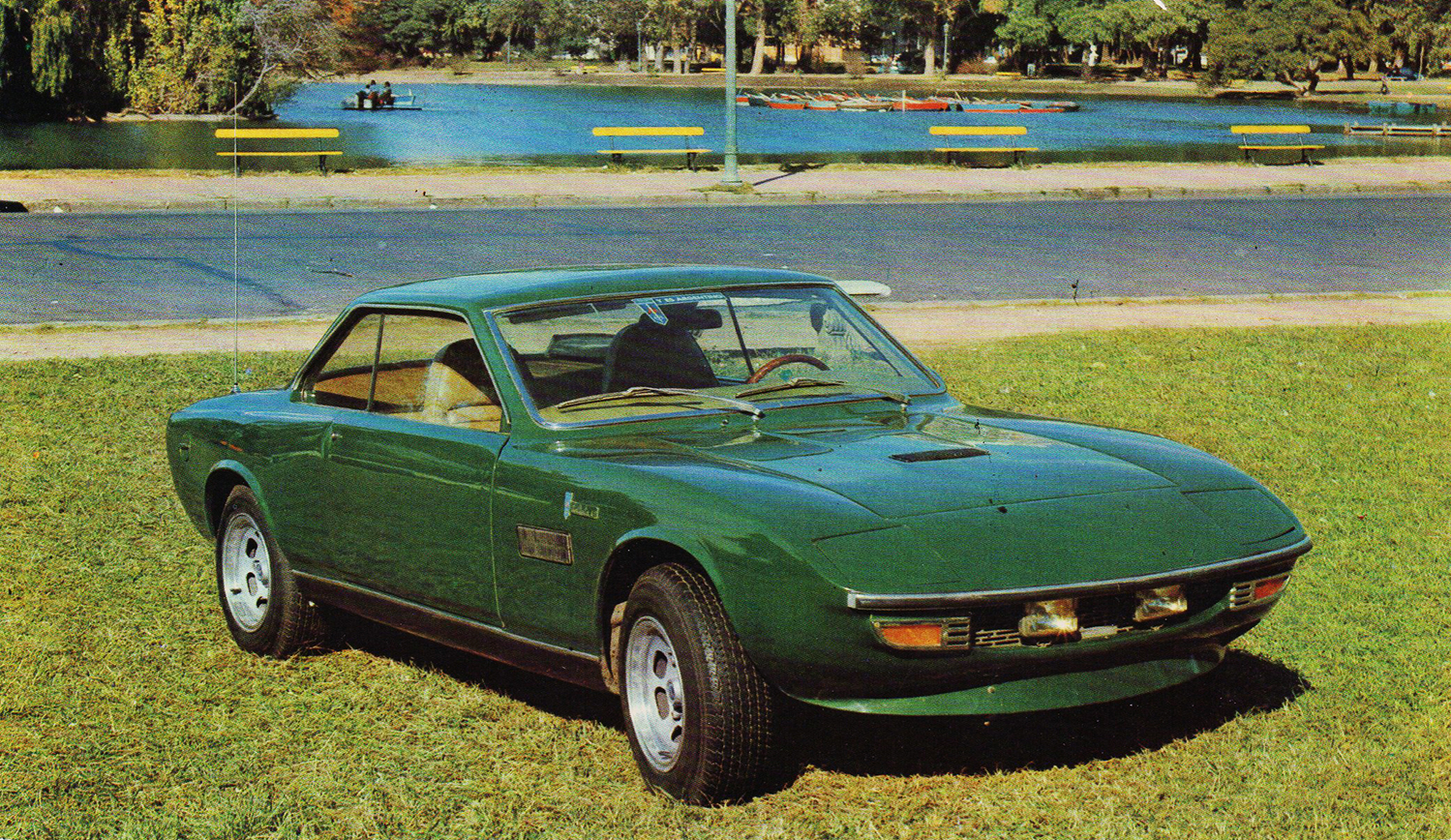
Tulieta, a sports car by Crespi launched in 1972

Crespi's most famous model, the Tulieta GT, came into production in 1972. The engine was a 1397cc or 85 cubic inch engine made by Renault, and was known for being unreliable as well. It was the same engine used in the 1976 R5 Alpine/Gordini, which produced 93 horsepower. The C6J Turbo engine was also used in a small number of the GTs. Later in 1977 Crespi ended production of the Tulieta GT, and only a few survive today. A total of 45 units were made.

Articles published on automobile magazines of Germany, France, and Japan about his business gave Crespi's global recognition so he received invitations to participate in the Paris Motor Show, which he had to refuse due to lack of financial resources. Nevertheless, in 1975 Crespi was invited to take the vacant place of British manufacturer Lotus which had withdrawn. After some arrangements, the Argentine Air Force provided a Lockheed C-130 Hercules to transport two cars, a Tulia and a Tulieta to be exhibited at the 62nd. Paris Show. It was the first time in the history of the show an Argentine manufacturer exhibited cars designed and produced in the country.

By mid-1970s, the Chacarita workshop could not keep up with the growing demand of vehicles. Helped by Juan Manuel Fangio, Crespi could acquire a land on PR226, only 4 kilometers distant from the city of Balcarce (home town of Fangio) to build and industrial plant and make Crespi's business grow. The factory was inaugurated in early 1980s and it has been producing vehicles since.

In 1985, Crespi launched the Spiaggia, a small convertible built on a Renault 4 platform. It had a reinforced plastic body, inspired on Renault 5 and four seats. Crespi's most recent vehicle was Campomóvil, a mini truck that featured a glass fibre-reinforced resin body and powered by a Briggs & Stratton engine, released in 2012. In 2022, Crespi launched a new version of the Campomóvil equipped with an electric motor.

== Business ==
Crespi Competición has exported its prototype cars to Ecuador, Colombia, México, and Chile. The company is also provider of racing cars for Turismo Carretera, TC 2000, and Turismo Nacional. Crespi's cars have been driven by Juan Manuel Fangio II, Oscar Aventín, Guillermo Ortelli, Omar Martínez, Fabián Acuña, Juan María Traverso, Daniel Cingolani, Miguel Etchegaray, Juan Manuel Silva, and Tito Bessone, among other notable drivers.

I have been constructing cars for over 53 years. I won in all the categories where they competed. Tulio Crespi S.A. is the factory that made most racing cars in the world. My cars ran more than 230,000 races.

— Crespi in an inverview in 2017
