= Five-Year Plans of Argentina =

Argentinian economic strategy under Juan Peron

The Five-Year Plan was Argentina's strategy for economic planning during President Juan Domingo Perón's first term.

== First Five Year Plan (1947–1951) ==
In mid-1946, the Technical Secretariat of the Presidency started drafting a five-year government plan for 1947–1951.

The Five Year Plan was first announced as a bill to be sent to the Congress, in the presidential message of October 19, 1946. The Article 1º consisted of the "Achievements and Investment Plan" and developed a number of other bills).

The plan aimed to streamline all export and import regulations, including product classification, packaging, and quality standards, and to create a customs procedure that fit the needs of the time. It decentralized and diversified industry, forming new productive areas, and placing them properly in terms of natural energy sources, means of communication, transportation and consumer markets. The plan aimed to secure raw materials, fuel, and equipment over five years while expanding Argentina’s industry and agriculture.

To speed up customs and port services, the plan proposed creating a central agency, the General Administration of Customs and Ports, which would have more authority than the previous Directorate of Customs.

Article 2 authorized the government to fund the plan by issuing Public Debt Securities or using other means, with annual reporting to Congress.

This was an unprecedented move: both houses of Congress were invited—not in a formal session, but as an open presentation by the President to senators and representatives.

The event took place in the floor of the House of Deputies on October 21, 1946, with full attendance for the ruling bloc, however the opposition failed to attend. The event was opened by the Senate President and Vice President of the Nation, Dr. Juan Hortensio Quijano; and later Perón and the Technical Secretary, barcelonan Dr. José Figuerola.

The government opened an outreach campaign, beginning with talks of President Juan Perón in the Teatro Colón, first with workers, and then with employers of the Argentine Industrial Union and the newly created Argentine Association of Production, Industry and Trade.

== Second Five Year Plan (1951–1955) ==
Argentina's second Five Year Plan was based on encouraging the growth of heavy industry. It was created in 1952, during the second term of Juan Domingo Perón (1951–1955).

=== Measures ===
During this time, Perón focused on promoting foreign investment in Argentina's trade. The main actions included:

1. Increasing foreign investment
2. Expanding heavy industry
3. Removing most subsidies and industrial loans
4. Partially restricting public consumption
5. Having the IAPI (Argentine Institute for the Promotion of Trade) purchase crops at lower-than-international prices to generate resources and boost industrialization.

=== Economy ===
The state managed exports of surplus domestic products and imported fuel, raw materials, and equipment essential for agriculture, industry, and mining.

=== Argentine Institute for the Promotion of Trade ===
The Argentine Institute for the Promotion of Trade (IAPI) was established on May 28, 1946, by decree nº 15350. Although signed by President Edelmiro Farrell, it was part of a plan developed by Colonel Juan Domingo Perón and his advisers. Operating under the Central Bank, the IAPI aimed to centralize foreign trade and redistribute resources across different economic sectors. The institute was led by economist Miguel Miranda, who was also the chairman of the Central Bank.

==== Objectives ====
The objective that guided the creation of this agency was the need to have an agency specialized in trade issues, a better external integration through the conquest of new markets, and the consolidation of Argentina's presence in those already obtained. It also sought to promote the quality and diversity of local products and create strategies to defend their prices in the international market against the eventual deterioration of the terms of trade; protecting domestic producers against the changes in international prices, and against the action of international monopolies and importing countries of Argentine products.

==== Features ====
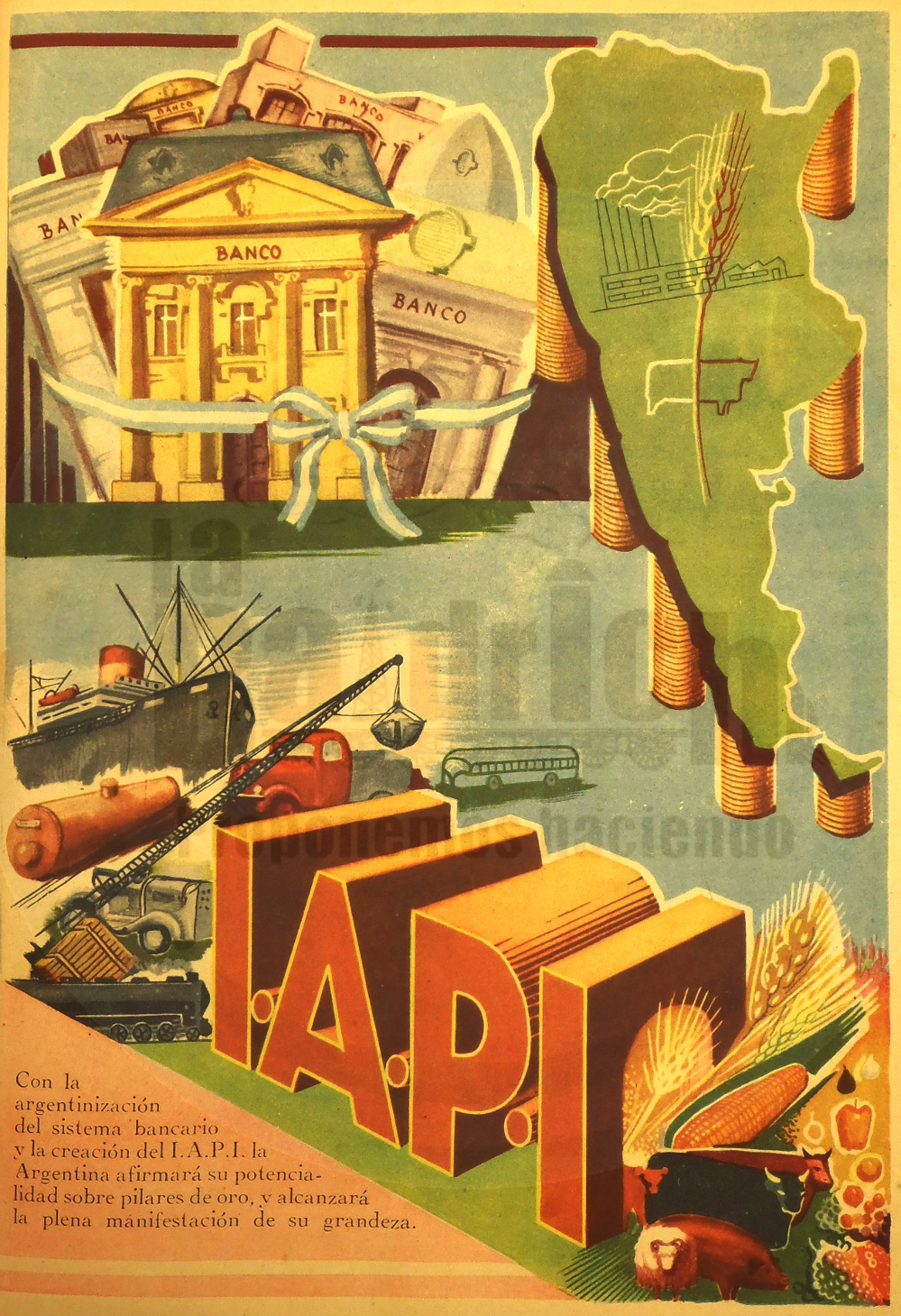
Propaganda of the First Five-Year Plan promoting the IAPI.

The body had different functions. At the commercial level, it was responsible for buying cereals and meat to the producers, and then export them when international prices were favorable. Also met financial functions, providing funds to certain public agencies, provincial governments and even to the private sector for the acquisition of capital goods. When the Institute acquired processed products which failed placement, it provided the profit margin for the industrial sector, creating a special joint committee to resolve the crisis in certain productive sectors, acquiring raw materials to give it to manufacturers. Also developed promotion and development functions, as determined which production activities were a priority and therefore should receive special treatment, for example, the granting of credits without obligation to repay. On the other hand, it subsidized the production of certain consumer goods in order to maintain the level of real wages.

==== Results ====
Trade agreements were reached with several countries. Between 1947 and 1949 reached trade agreements with Switzerland, Hungary, Italy, the Netherlands, Norway, Finland, Denmark, Brazil and Sweden. Despite the efforts made by the body to expand the portfolio of buyers of Argentine products, the United Kingdom continued to rank first as an importer, followed by the United States.

Concerning imports, the importance of IAPI was significantly lower. The major purchases were recorded in the areas of metallurgy, building materials, machinery and textiles, standing out as sellers United States and Great Britain, while trade with the Soviet Union reported a significant increase since 1953.

==== Decline ====
After World War II, agricultural prices declined due to Europe’s economic recovery, reducing IAPI’s main revenue source.

Since 1949 the institute's activities dwindled, leading to the private sector take over much of the exchange. In its relations with the private sector, the large subsidies granted IAPI: between 1947 and 1954 agricultural subsidies amounted to 5,063,011 pesos, while the livestock sector amounted 4,567,590 pesos.

Finally, the deficit turned out to be important enough to motivate the redesign of its convenience (in its latest report the agency's operating deficit amounted to 20,000 million pesos or 3% of the GDP of that time).

== Works carried out ==
- In 1952, the Peronist government decided to fully repay the foreign debt, transforming the country from a debtor of m$n 12.5 billion into a creditor of more than m$n 5 billion.
- Through the state company Obras Sanitarias de la Nación, a public works program was carried out for the period 1947–1951. In 1942, about 6.5 million inhabitants had access to running water and 4 million to sewerage services; by 1955, the beneficiaries had increased to 10 million and 5.5 million respectively.
- Housing: construction of 350,000 homes for workers throughout the country, including developments such as Barrio Residencial Cornelio Saavedra (Buenos Aires), the apartments of Barrio Curapaligue, the Ezeiza Highway, Ciudad Evita, Barrio Los Perales, and Barrio Manuel Dorrego.

== Gallery ==
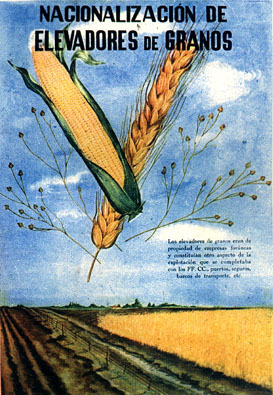
Propaganda for the nationalization of grain elevators

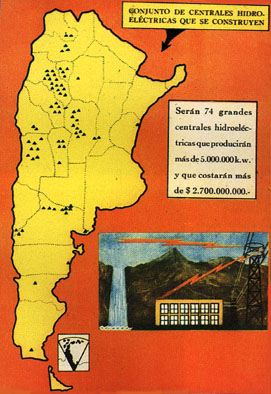
Propaganda for the hydroelectric power plants to be built

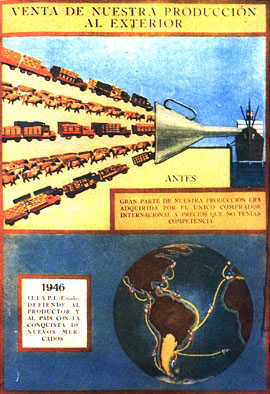
Propaganda of the First Five-Year Plan: export of national production

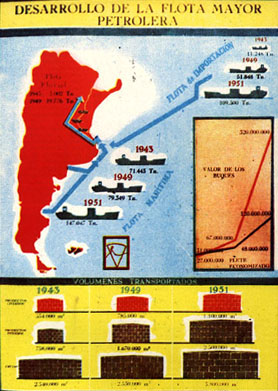
Propaganda illustrating the development of the Argentine oil fleet, 1943–1951
