= IAME Rastrojero =

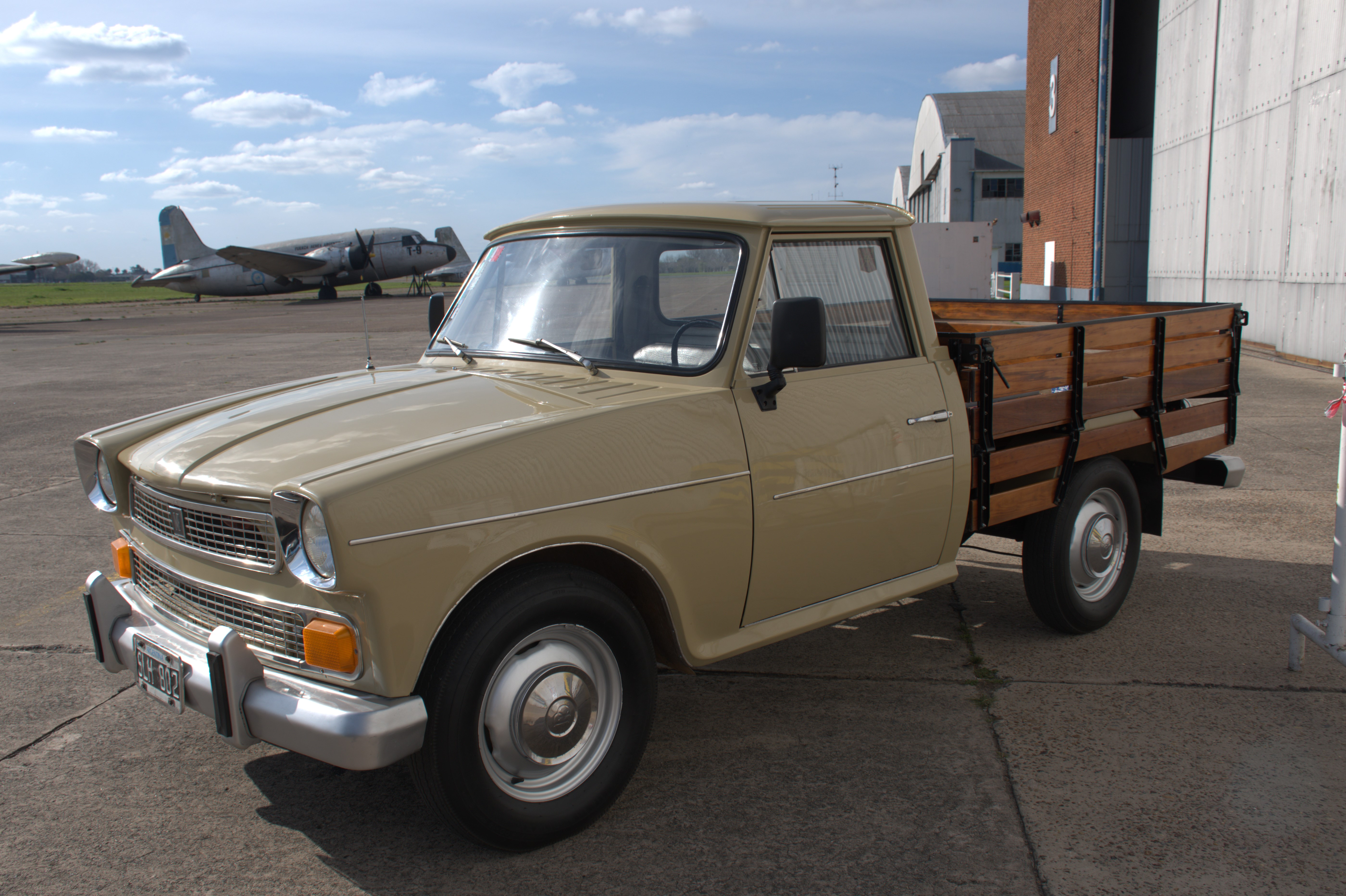

Overview
- Manufacturer: IAME (Industrias Aeronáuticas y Mecánicas del Estado)
- Production: 1952–1979
- Assembly: Argentina: Córdoba

Body and chassis
- Class: One-ton Pickup truck

Chronology
- Successor: Ranquel Pick Up

The Rastrojero is a small utility pickup truck (taxis were also developed) with a capacity of half-ton designed by Raúl Gómez and built by the Argentine government-owned airplane (and vehicle) manufacturer IAME (Industrias Aeronáuticas y Mecánicas del Estado) from 1952 to 1979. It owes its name to its purpose of being driven on crop residue (rastrojos). Over 33,000 of these trucks were manufactured.

== First generation (1952–1969) ==
First Generation
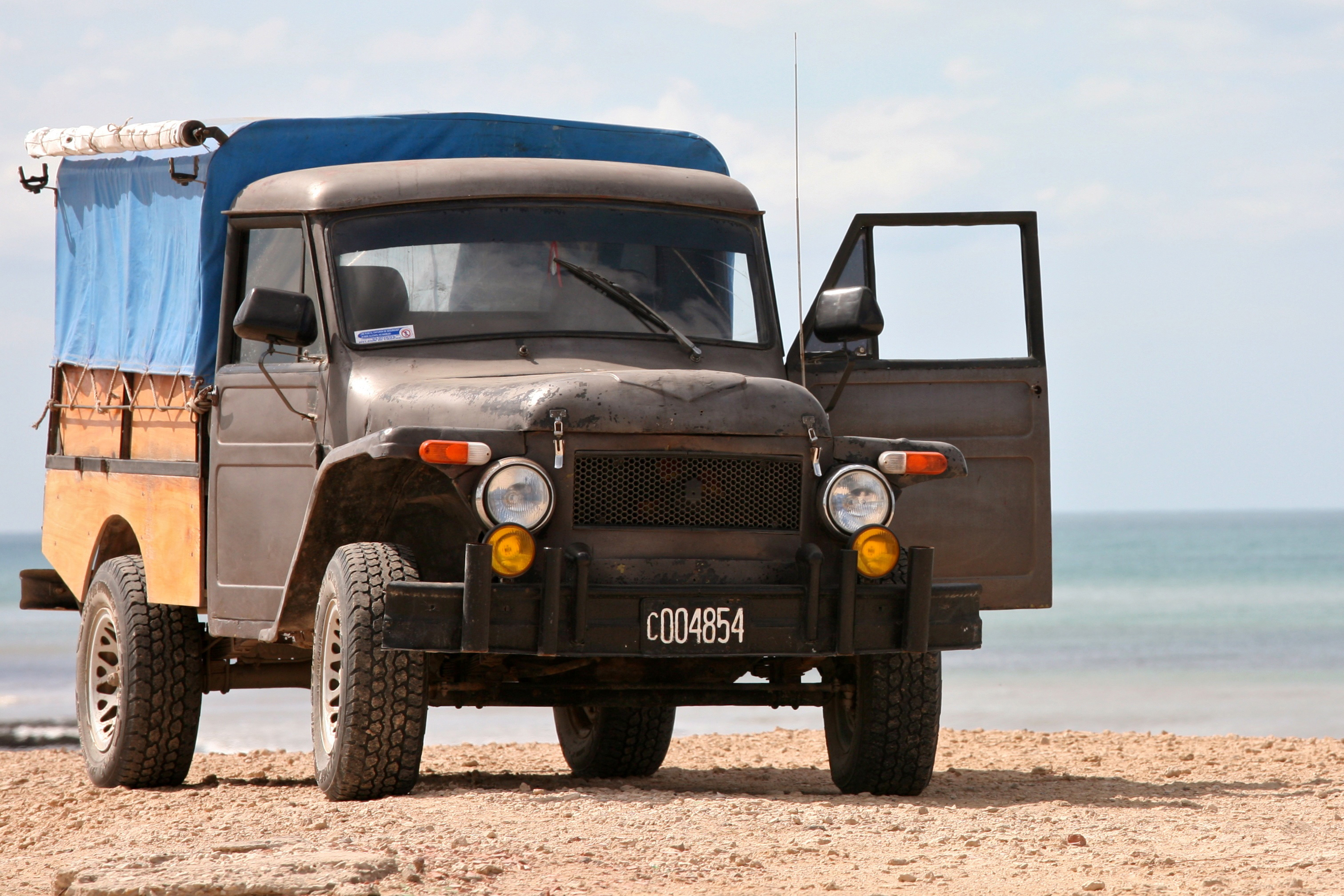

Overview
- Production: 1952–1969

Body and chassis
- Body style: 2-door pickup truck 2-door flat bed with wooden drop-side 2-door cab chassis 2-door crew cab
- Layout: Front engine, rear-wheel drive

Powertrain
- Engine: 2.2 L (134 cu in) I4 Willys petrol 1.8 L (110 cu in) I4 Borgward Diesel
- Transmission: 3-speed manual

Dimensions
- Wheelbase: 105.5 in (2,680 mm)
- Length: 183.08 in (4,650 mm)
- Width: 66.53 in (1,690 mm)
- Height: 65.4 in (1,661 mm)
- Curb weight: 2,800 lb (1,270 kg); 4,233 lb (1,920 kg) Max. GWV

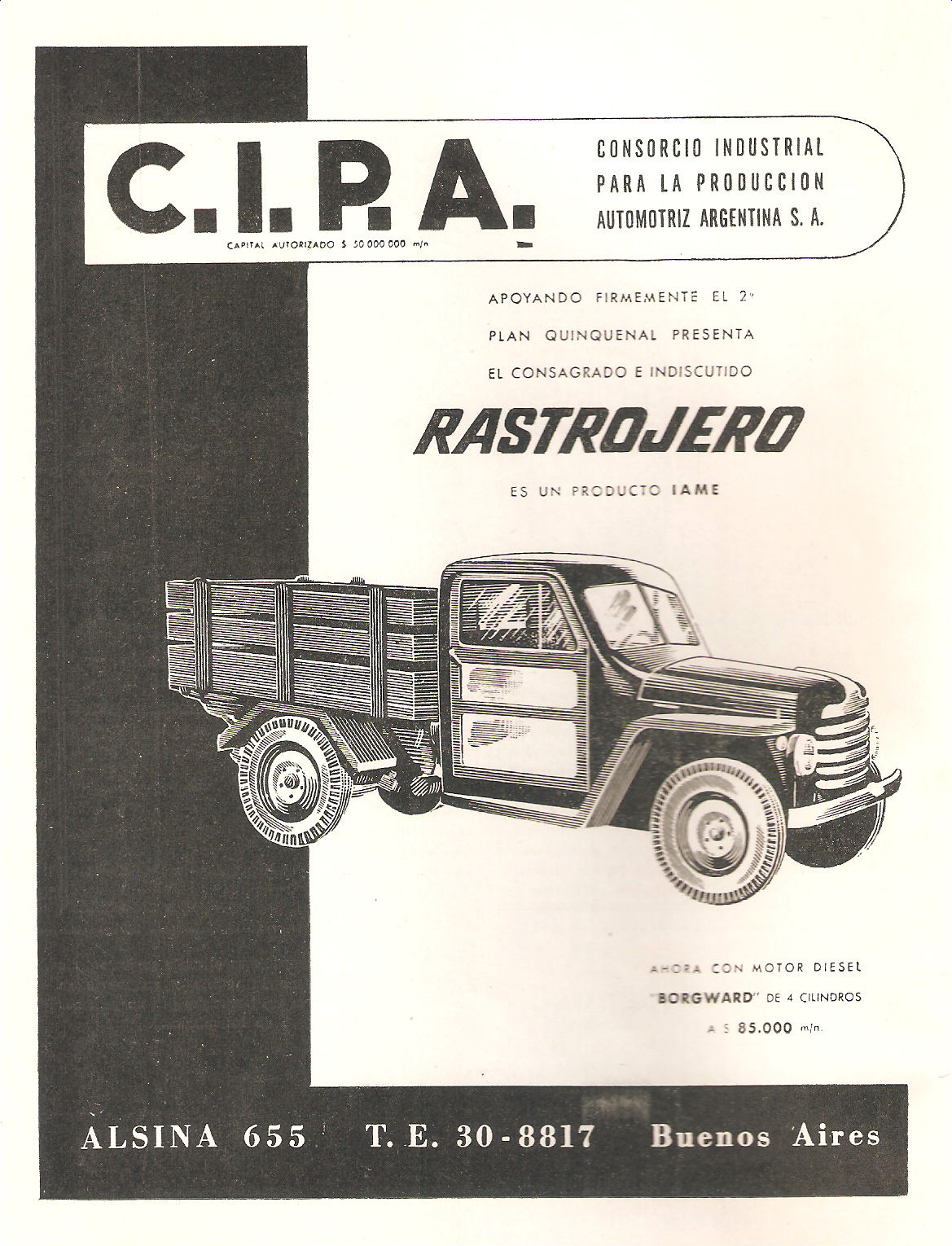
Advertisement for the Rastrojero from 1954

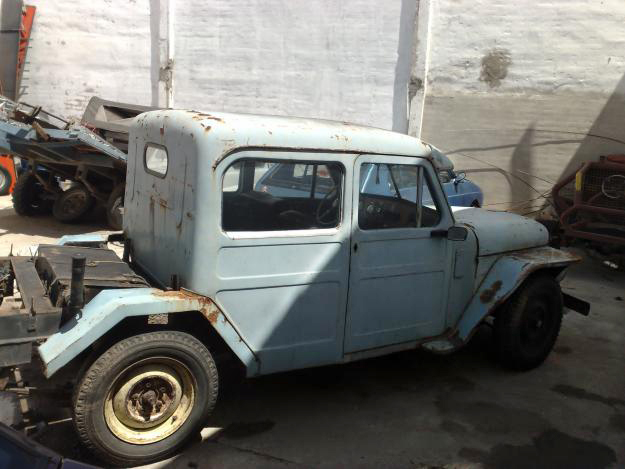
IAME Rastrojero crew cab

The Rastrojero was developed by the state owned Industrias Aeronáuticas y Mecánicas del Estado during the epoch of stimulus to the local work force and support to domestic industry under the presidency of General Juan Domingo Perón. For the production of this vehicle, IAME used parts from Empire Tractors, which had been purchased from the United States a few years after end of World War II. These initial tractors had some design problems, and were eventually discontinued. Finally, these tractors were converted by a group of technicians and engineers who worked on making the new truck. The original Rastrojero pickup truck first rolled off the assembly line in 1952. From 1952 to 1954, a Willys-Overland 2,199 cm^{3} (134 cu in) gasoline engine from the Empire Tractor purchase were used and, starting in 1954, a 42 horsepower Borgward D4M diesel engine of 1758 cm^{3} with indirect injection.

Particular attention was given to the front fender design, bearing in mind that it would be a vehicle for the rural and off road use. The fender lines were designed similar in shape to the ones used at the time for Turismo Carretera road racing, so the vehicle would not collect excessive amounts of mud under the fenders.

== Second generation (1969–1979) ==
Second Generation
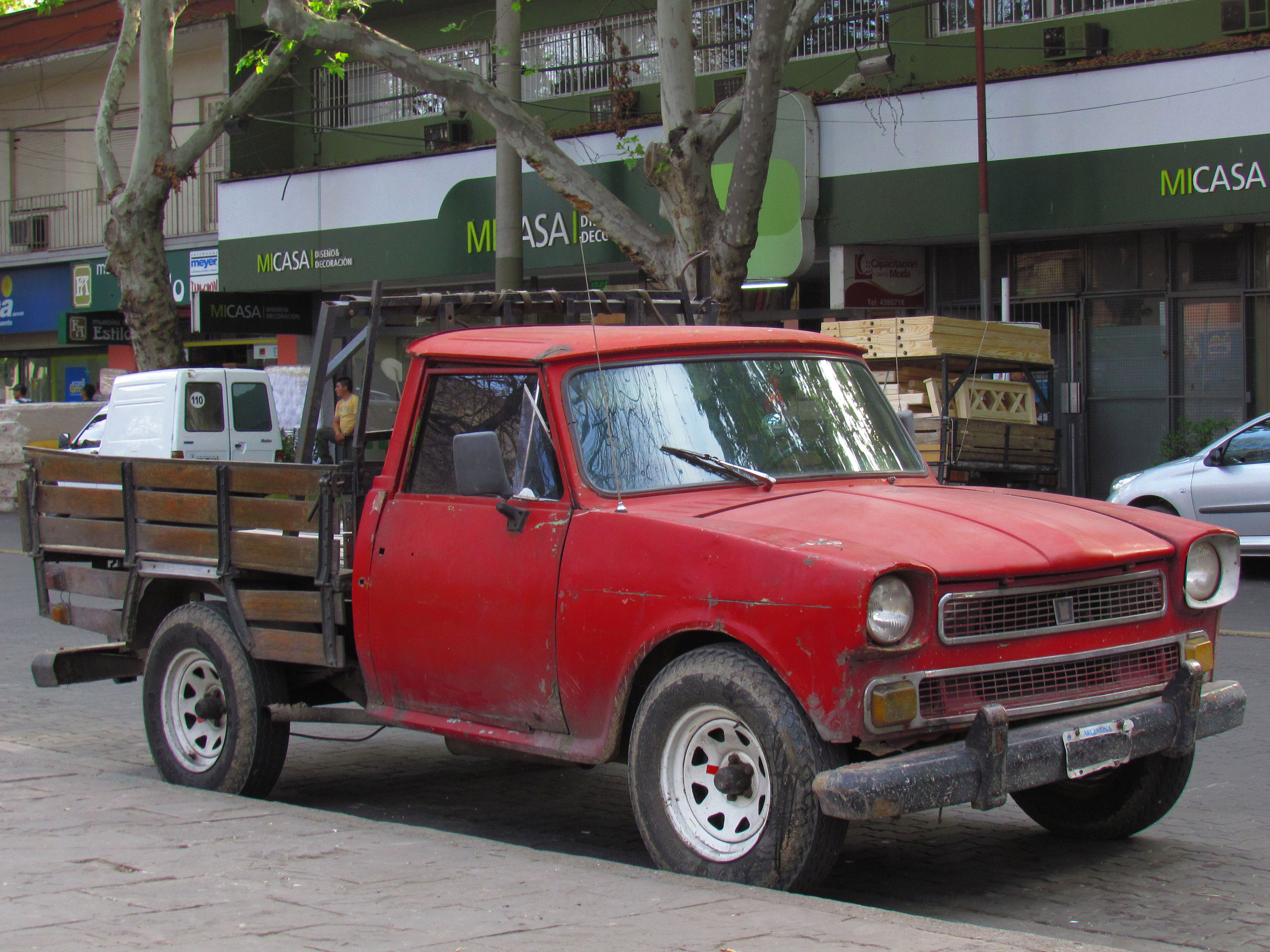

Overview
- Production: 1969–1979

Body and chassis
- Body style: 2-door pickup truck 2-door flat bed with wooden drop-side 2-door cab chassis 2 or 4-door crew cab 4-door panel van 4-door wagon
- Layout: Front engine, rear-wheel drive / four-wheel drive

Powertrain
- Engine: 1.8 L (110 cu in) Borgward I4 (diesel); 2.0 L (122 cu in) Indenor I4 (diesel)
- Transmission: 4-speed manual

This advertisement boasts: built to last, the first national pick-up chassis specially designed for diesel engines

In 1968, the Rastrojero's body got a complete redesign. The new model's styling was more car-like with the aspect of a tougher vehicle. Its design featured a bodywork made entirely of steel with fully floating cab and separate cargo section for the two door models while the cab and box were built into an integrated assembly for the four doors models. However, there were also models that still had flat beds with wooden boxes and drop-sides. In addition to its aesthetics, its powertrain had been modified as well. The new model came equipped with an Indenor XD 4.88 52 hp 4-cylinder diesel engine sourced from Peugeot, with a 4-speed gear box. Despite this motor change, Borgward continued to provide transmissions.

In 1974, minor redesign changes were made on the front and rear of the body.

Despite several attempts by the Ministry of Aeronautics and Defense to stop their production, the Rastrojero's production continued. The engineers, technicians and employees of the factory, fearing production would be shut down, were guaranteed its production until 1979. During this time, the evolution of the body was nil because of these attempts to cut its production. In spite of that, there was still significant evolution of its power plant, beginning with gasoline engines getting 65HP, passing up the Borgward diesel with 42HP and ending with the Indenor XD2 diesel with 68HP.

At the time, the factory had offered different models based on the Rastrojero; among those is a cab over truck, a van based on that truck, and the Rastrojero Conosur, which is a sedan based on the second-generation Rastrojero that was designed exclusively to be used in taxi fleets.

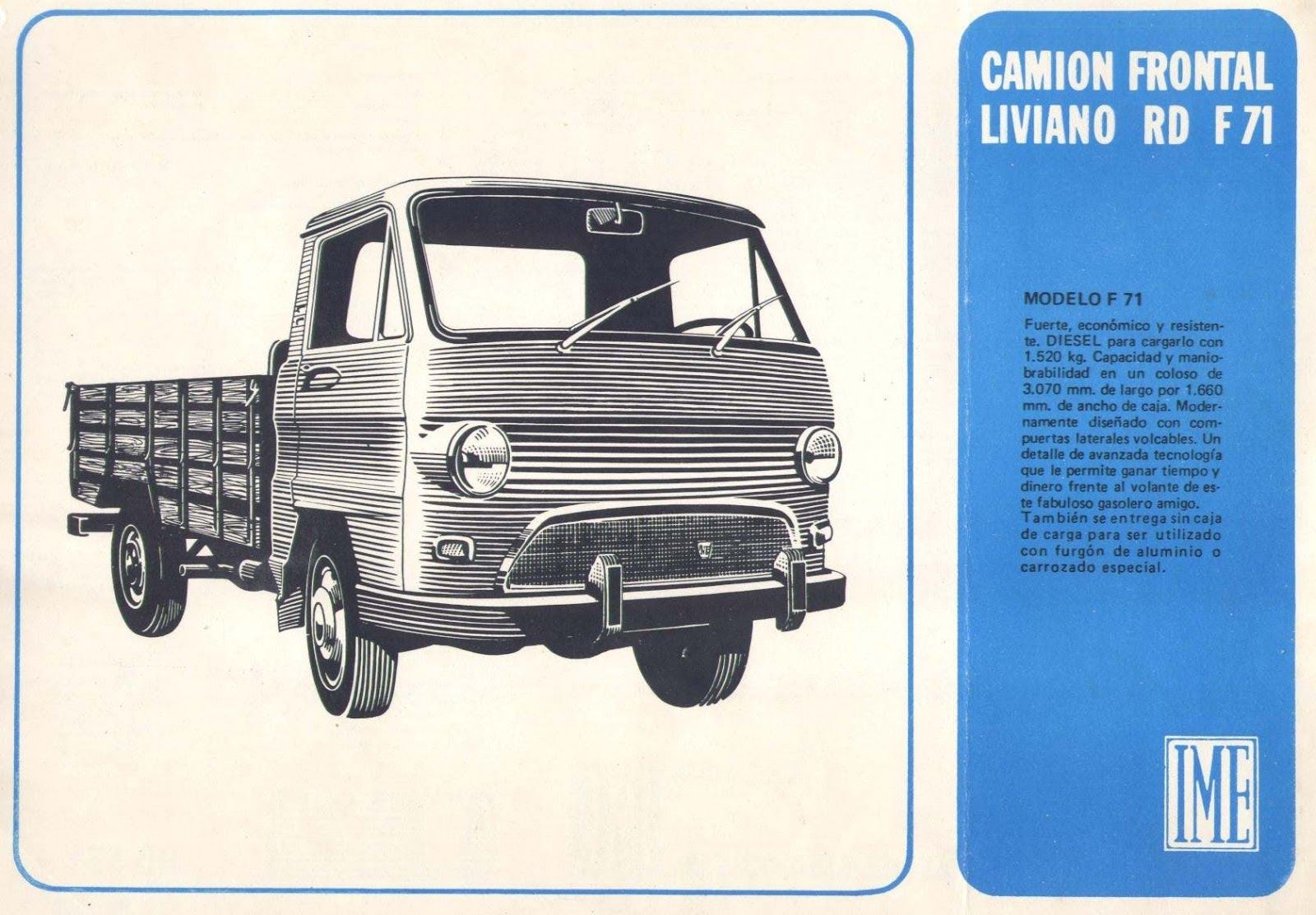
IAME Rastrojero F71

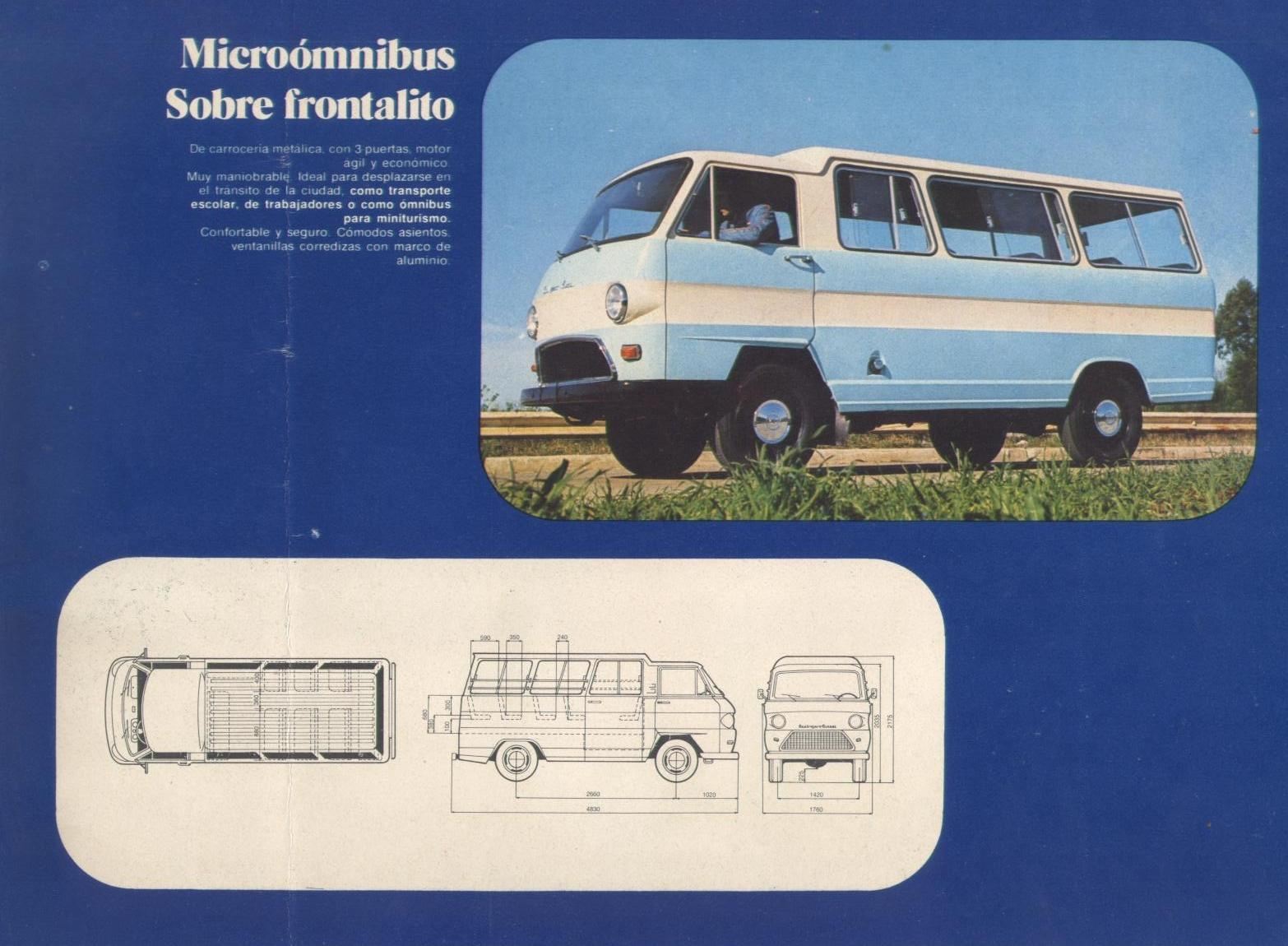
IAME Rastrojero F71 Microbus

By instruction from the government's National Reorganization Process prevailing in Argentina, the production of the Rastrojero and all of its derivatives ended in 1979.

== See also ==
- IAME (State Aeronautical and Mechanical Industries)
- IAME Rastrojero Conosur
- Willys-Overland Truck
- Ñandú (jeep)
