= Industrias Aeronáuticas y Mecánicas del Estado =

Argentinian state-run automotive and aeronautical manufacturing company

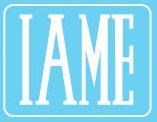

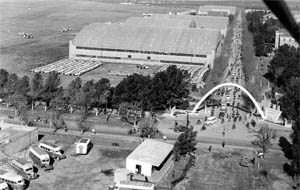
- Type: State-owned
- Industry: Metallurgy
- Founded: 1951
- Founder: Juan Domingo Perón
- Defunct: May 22, 1979; 47 years ago
- Fate: Defunct
- Headquarters: Argentina
- Area served: Argentina
- Key people: Brig. Juan I. San Martín (President)
- Products: Automobiles, airplanes, tractors, motorcycles, motorboats, weapons
- Owner: Government of Argentina
- Number of employees: 3,000
- Divisions: List: Airplane; Airplane Engines; Automobiles; Equipment & Instrument; Jet Engines; Machines and Tools; Motorcycles; Parachutes; Propellers & Accessories; Tractors

Industrias Aeronáuticas y Mecánicas del Estado (Spanish for State Aeronautical and Mechanical Industries, abbreviated IAME) was a state-owned entity and autarchic conglomerate of factories of Argentina created in 1951 to promote the manufacture of aircraft and automobiles during the Juan Perón administration.

The company was established to manufacture automobiles in the country, taking advantage of the advances of Aerotechnical Institute of Córdoba Province. At its peak, IAME manufactured (apart from automobiles) airplanes, tractors, motorcycles, motorboats, and weapons. In 1956, it was renamed "Dirección Nacional de Fabricación e Investigación Aeronáutica" (Spanish for National Directorate of Aeronautical Manufacturing and Research, abbreviated "DINFIA").

In 1967, it was established that DINFIA would focus on aeronautics and aerospace, while the automotive division would be taken over by another company created with that purpose, "Industrias Mecánicas del Estado" (IME). The company was finally shut down in 1979 by the military dictatorship that ruled Argentina during the National Reorganization Process.

== History ==
=== Constitution ===
After completion of the Five-Year Plans ("Plan Quinquenal"), the administration of President Juan Perón had failed to establish a solid foundation for the growth of heavy industry. The trade balance in the automotive heading was unfavorable in 1951, imported around 20,000 units. Therefore, Perón met with representatives of major foreign automakers to boost car production in the country. His proposal was rejected by the foreign manufacturers, arguing that Argentina lacked the necessary expertise for the task and admitting only have a few autoparts Argentina invoice or final assembly in the country of foreign auto parts.

Decree nº 24.103 dated on 30 November 1951 set the establishment of "Fábrica de Motores y Automotores" (Motor and motorcar factory) which was absorbed in 1952 by "Industrias Aeronáuticas y Mecánicas del Estado" (IAME), which also took over the Instituto Aerotécnico. The main purpose of the recently created business was to produce automobiles, aircraft, motorcycles, and tractors, setting the serial production date on 1 November 1952. The company began operations at Fábrica Militar de Aviones.

IAME conglomerate took the legal form of company self-sufficient, with a directory, general administration and administrations of factories. The first directory was chaired by Juan Ignacio San Martin. Financing funds came from a loan from the Industrial Bank of Argentina of $53,000,000, guaranteed by the State under the doctrine of Peronism.

The IAME had 12,000 workers and managers at the time. There were many projects, following a low-cost policy that allowed mass production to achieve low manufacturing costs. It also acquired licenses to produce locally European automotive models of low cost and easy maintenance-mainly Germans-to ensure expertise in the production and adaptation of use. When licenses were not acquired, projects initiated were highly influenced by the original models in question.

=== Demise ===
The military dictatorship that ruled Argentina during the National Reorganization Process set the closure of IME on May 22, 1979. Then Minister of Economy, José Alfredo Martínez de Hoz, carried out the decision alleging economic reasons.

=== Models produced ===
==== Justicialista ====
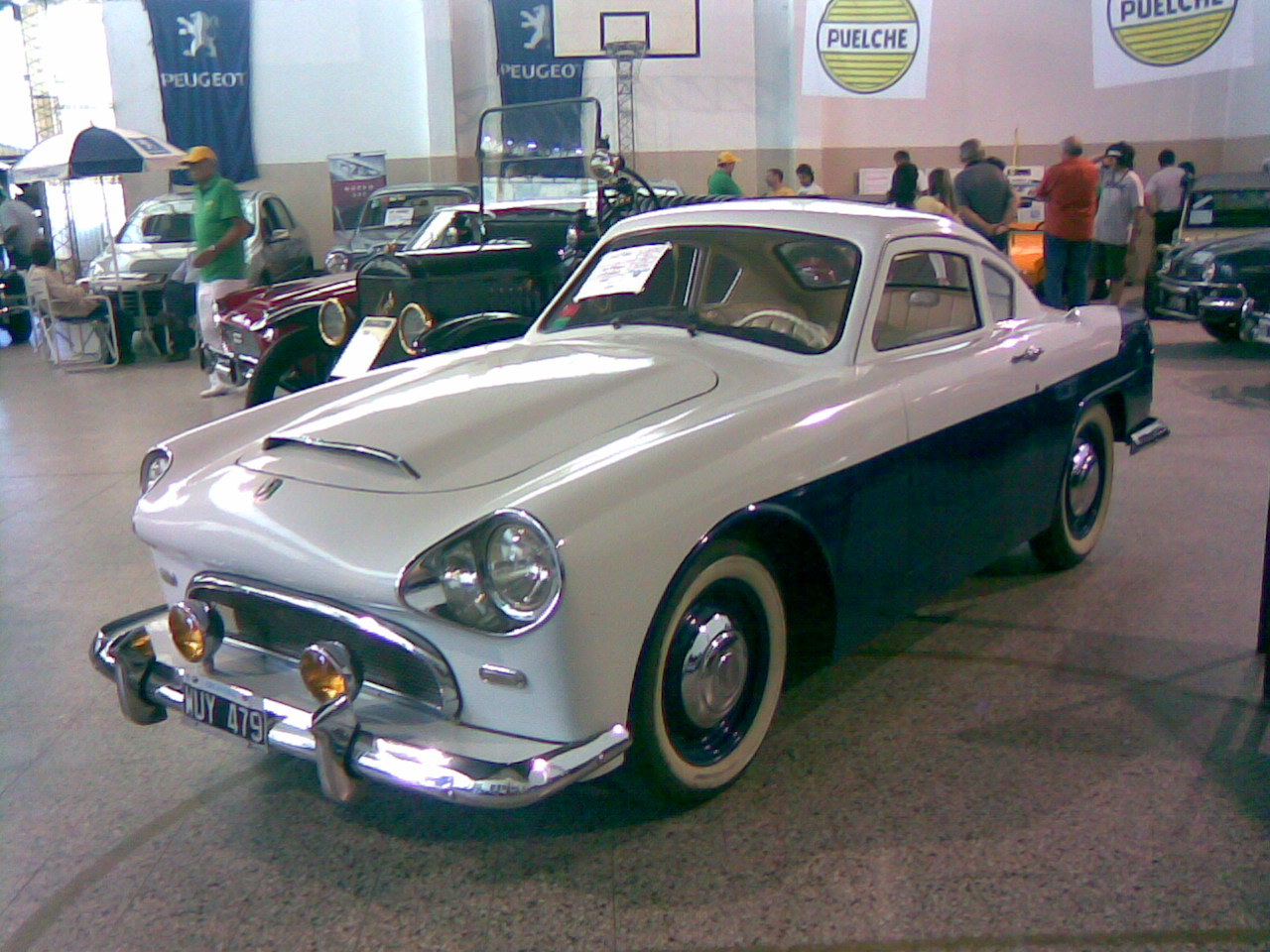
Justicialista, the first car released by IAME in 1952

By the beginning of the 1950s, some of the most developed countries in Latin America (Argentina, Brazil and Mexico) were in process to substitute imports. Therefore, the local industry was revitalised in order to build automobiles. In 1949, President of Argentina Juan Perón signed a decree to refurbish part of the Aircraft Factory, adapting it to start manufacturing automobiles. José Higinio Monserrat was appointed as the first director of the Automobile Factory while engineer Raúl Gómez, who work at the Aerotechnical Institute of Córdoba ("Institec"), was another key figure of IAME.

The first car manufactured by IAME was the Justicialista model in 1952. This car had a body designed in Argentina but inspired on the Chevrolet models of those times. They were powered with Wartburg engines imported from Germany. The first prototype was developed and built in only 90 days, using national materials for manufacturing it. The Justicialista line included a sedan, the chatita (small pickup), van, and a sport coupe. They were sold at low prices, with a total of 3,730 units produced.

After General Perón was deposed by the Revolución Libertadora in 1955, the Justicialista was rebranded as Graciela by the Military Government. The sport version was cancelled while the sedan and small pickup lasted until 1957.

==== Rastrojero ====
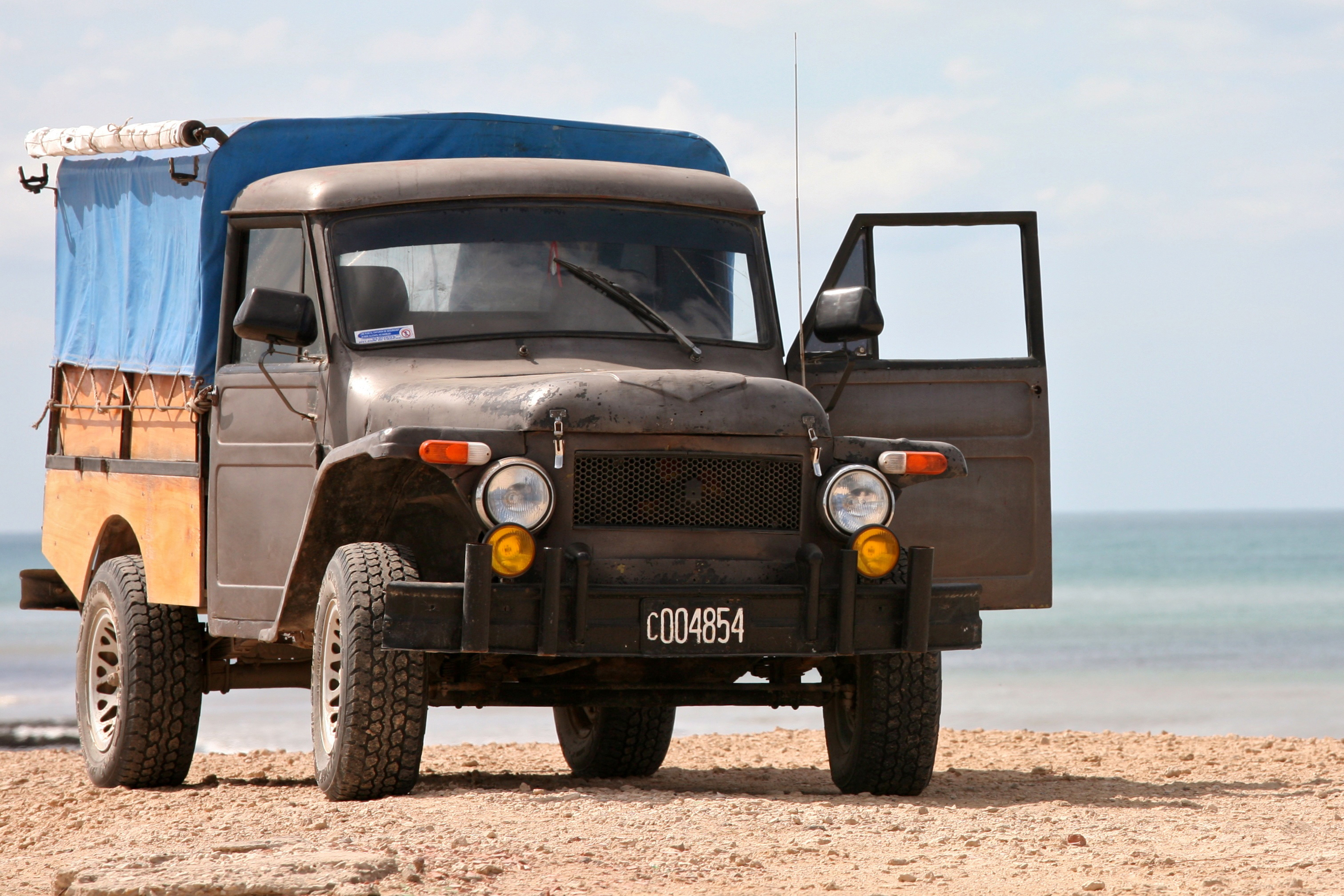
Rastrojero (here the pickup version) was the most successful model by IAME, with more than 60,000 units produced

The most successful model by IAME was the Rastrojero, a small utility pickup truck with 60,000 units produced. The Rastrojero was originally thought as a tractor to replace some cheap units imported from the United States (a total of 2,500 that had been purchased at a low price but were dismissed after a brief period due to multiple failures). After the US tractors were retired, Brigadier San Martín (president of IAME) took those tractors to use some of their components to create a new and improved model. The results were two vehicles, the Gauchita –a prototype similar to the Station Wagon by American manufacturer Willys– and a pickup (then named "Rastrojero"). Developed in 1955, the Gauchita was powered with a D4M18 Borgward diesel engine.

The Rastrojero had a chassis similar to the 1937 Ford with a body similar to the Turismo Carretera cars of the time. The load was built in wood, to optimize costs and time. The prototypes were released in May 1952, with a huge success so the initial limited production of 2,500 "tractors" became production series. In 1955 the Rastrojero was powered with a diesel engine by Borgward. A part of the classic pickup, the Rastrojero had other versions such as a light truck (named "Camión Frontal", produced 1969–79 with the same body than Borgward B611) an omnibus (mainly used as school bus), and a 4-door sedan, the Rastrojero Conosur, specifically designed for use in taxi fleet.

==== Pampa ====
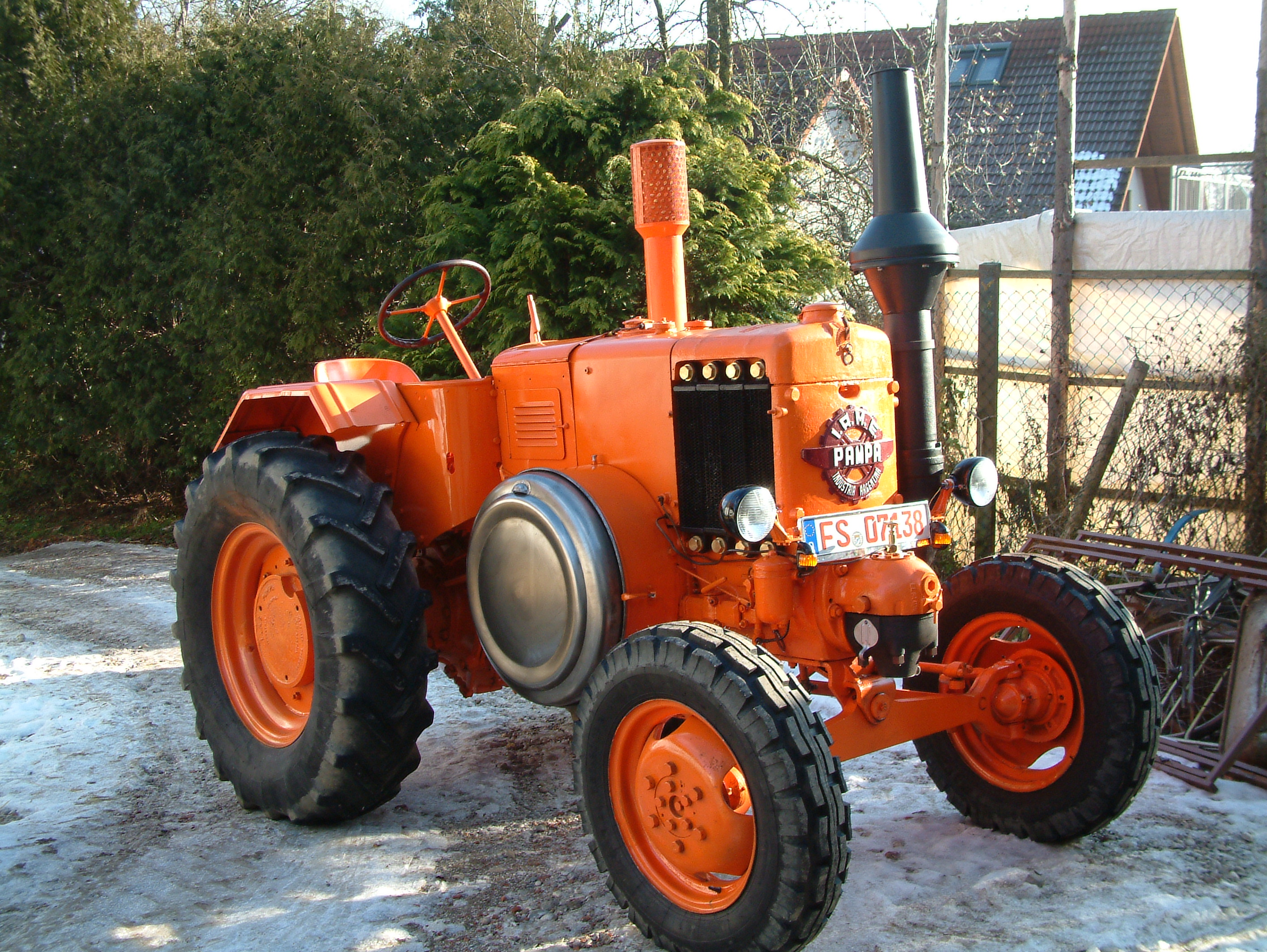
Pampa tractor (pictured in 2005) with its original orange color

The IAME Tractor Factory and Motorcycles had two significatie products, the Pampa tractor and the Puma motorcycle. The Pampa was developed to provide agricultural machinery to satisfy the needs of local farmers. The project to manufacture tractors in Argentina stated in June 1952, with the idea of a vehicle that could be operated easily.

The original idea for the development of an Argentine tractor was to use German Lanz Bulldog D 9506 tractor (produced by Heinrich Lanz AG) as inspiration. The D9506 was a simple vehicle that could be fueled with different combustibles such as gasoil, kerosene, raw oil, animal grease and even parafine. Two D9506 units were brought from Uruguay to analyze their mechanism and components, nevertheless and due to the date stipulated by Perón to release a prototype (90 days) was about to be reached, the development of a fully-manufactured tractor was dismissed. Instead, IAME used the tractors built in Germany with slight modifications on their fronts, releasing them as "new" products. The first prototype was finished in October 1952, and two months later, 15 Pampa tractors were tested in agricultural works. The local subsidiary of Fiat gave assistance for the manufacture of the vehicle through some cooperation agreements.

The Pampa tractor was produced in Estación Ferreyra, Córdoba Province, with the first models released to public (12 units) in 1954, offered at m$n85,000, lower than similar products by those times. A total of 3,760 were produced from 1953 to 1963, when the Government sold the factory to private company Perkins.

==== Puma ====
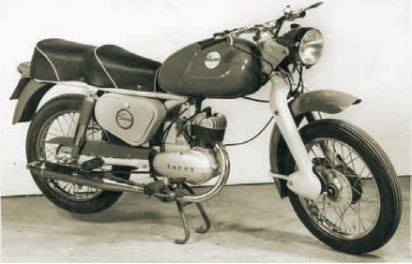
Puma fourth series

Manufactured in the plant of Córdoba, development of this motorcycle started in June 1952, with the purpose of manufacturing a simple and effective vehicle. In May 1953 the factory is established near Villa Carlos Paz in Córdoba Province, with the first prototype being launched months later, inspired on a German Göricke model that had been given to Perón as a gift. The Puma was equipped with a Sachs engine and kick pedal. Due to its low price and good performance, the motorcycle was well received, encouraging IAME to produce more models.

The second series was launched in 1956, with 56,928 units sold. The fourth series (no "third" series were released) came in 1959, with changes in its design. That series (consisting of two different models) sold 36,755 units, while the fifth (and last) generation was launched in 1963, with 1,936 motorcycles sold. The Puma had a total of five series, with the last two being the most popular among users. In general, the Puma was mostly used by low and mid classes, being regarded as a reliable product at an affordable price. In 1966 the factory was closed, so the production ceased. At the time of the closure, IAME had sold a total of 105,675 Puma motorcycles.

==== Other ====
Production also included boating with tourism boats, fishing boats, a portable boat, the sailing school Tero (sailboat), a Canadian canoe and an outboard motor Surubí.
