= Pulqui =

The Pulqui (from indigenous language Mapudungun, Pulqúi: Arrow) was a series of jet prototypes developed by Argentina after World War II. They were the first jet aircraft developed in Latin America.

- I.Ae. 27 Pulqui I (1947)
- FMA IAe 33 Pulqui II (1950)
- El Pulqui (Empresa) (1963)
