= FMA Pulqui =

FMA Pulqui may refer to:

- FMA I.Ae. 27 Pulqui I
- FMA IAe 33 Pulqui II
