= P1101 =

P1101 or P.1101 may refer to:

- Messerschmitt P.1101, a 1944 single-seat jet fighter
- Hawker P.1101, a 1955 two-seat jet trainer prototype
