= Focke-Wulf Ta 283 =

German ramjet interceptor project

Strahlrohrjäger
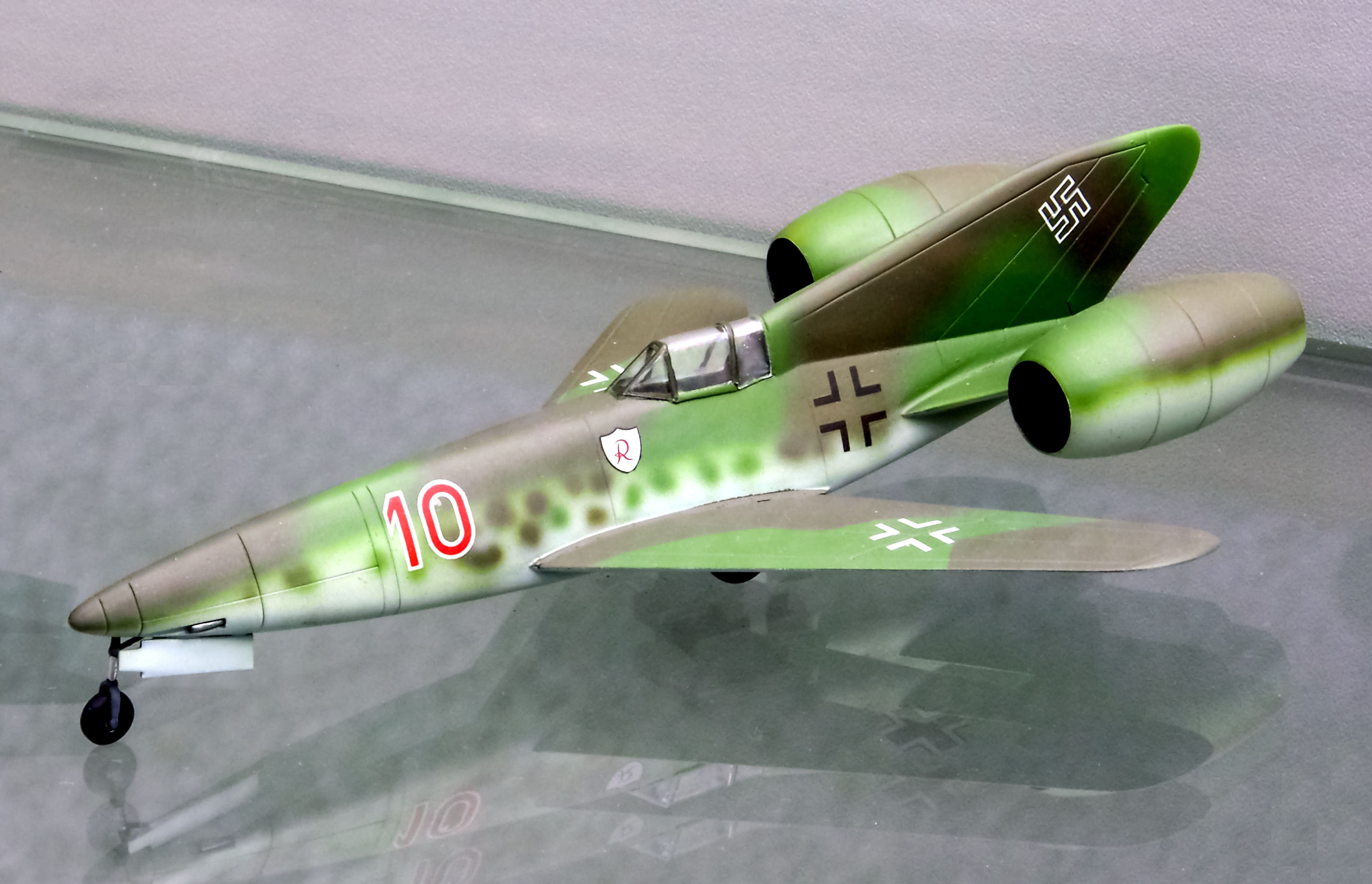
- Focke-Wulf Strahlrohrjäger model at the Technik Museum Speyer

General information
- Type: Interceptor
- Manufacturer: Focke-Wulf
- Status: Terminated by end of war
- Primary user: Luftwaffe (intended)
- Number built: None completed

The Focke-Wulf Strahlrohrjäger was a German swept wing, ramjet-powered interceptor aircraft proposal during World War II. The project was proposed at the same time as the Focke-Wulf Super Lorin and remained only a design study until the surrender of Nazi Germany.

== Development ==
Power for the Strahlrohrjäger was to be provided by a Walter HWK 509 rocket engine for takeoff, and two Pabst ramjets. The rocket would provide enough initial velocity to start the ramjet engines which cannot produce thrust at zero or low airspeed. The ramjets were located on the tips of the sharply swept tailplanes and would be used for cruising. The wings were mounted low in the fuselage and swept at 45°. Armament was to have been two 30 mm (1.18 in) MK 108 cannon.

Although referred to as Ta 283 in many publications, there is no evidence that the Strahlrohrjäger was allocated an RLM designation, and "Ta 283" is a postwar invention derived from the drawing number Nr. 283 for the Strahlrohrjäger.

== See also ==
Aircraft of comparable role, configuration, and era

- Focke-Wulf Ta 183
- Focke-Wulf Super Lorin

Related lists

- List of German aircraft projects, 1939–45
- List of World War II Luftwaffe aircraft prototype projects
- List of RLM aircraft designations
