= Focke-Wulf Super Lorin =

Combined rocket and ramjet powered interceptor concept aircraft

Super Lorin
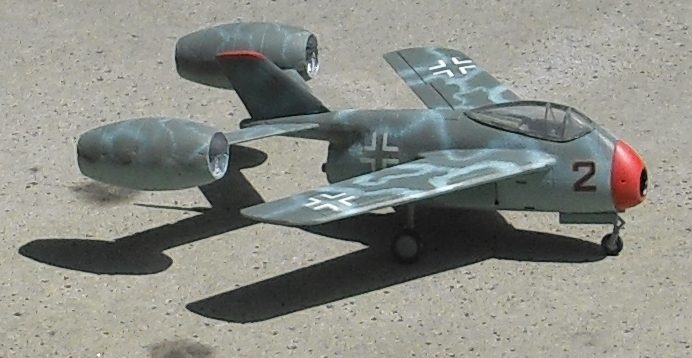
- Focke-Wulf Super Lorin model

General information
- Type: Interceptor aircraft
- Manufacturer: Focke-Wulf
- Status: Terminated by end of war
- Primary user: Luftwaffe (intended)
- Number built: None

History
- Developed from: Focke-Wulf Ta 183

The Focke-Wulf Super Lorin was a proposed German jet interceptor project. Designed towards the end of World War II by engineer Heinz von Halen, the project remained only a factory design exercise, and never received an RLM airframe number before the surrender of Nazi Germany.

== Development ==
Little is known about this project apart from brief mention in surviving documents; it was designed around the same time as the Focke-Wulf Ta 283. The Super Lorin was based on the Focke-Wulf Ta 183, with similar mid-fuselage positioned wings swept at 45°.

The aircraft would have a wingspan of 7.6 m and a length of 11.6 m. Power was to be provided by a fuselage-mounted rocket engine and small turbojet for takeoff; two Lorin ramjets located on the tips of the sharply swept tailplane would be used for cruising. The rocket and turbojet would provide enough initial velocity to start the ramjet engines which cannot produce thrust at zero or low airspeed. Armament was to have been two 30 mm (1.18 in) MK 108 cannon.

== See also ==
Aircraft of comparable role, configuration, and era

- Focke-Wulf Ta 183
- Focke-Wulf Ta 283

Related lists

- List of German aircraft projects, 1939–45
