= Bell X-5 =

NASA experimental variable-sweep wing aircraft

X-5
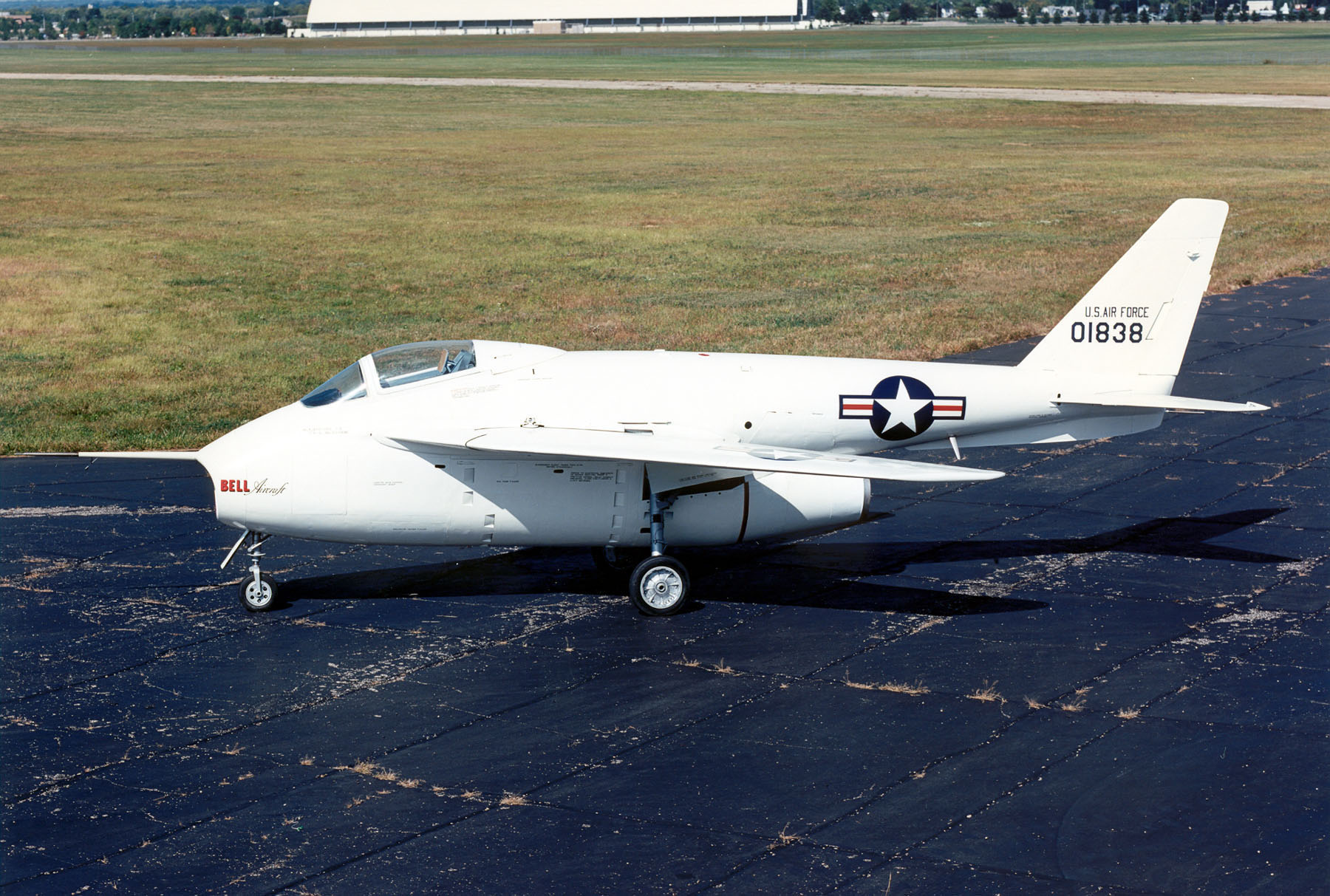

General information
- Type: Experimental aircraft
- Manufacturer: Bell Aircraft Corporation
- Designer: Robert J. Woods
- Primary users: United States Air Force National Advisory Committee for Aeronautics
- Number built: 2

History
- First flight: 20 June 1951
- Retired: December 1958
- Developed from: Messerschmitt P.1101

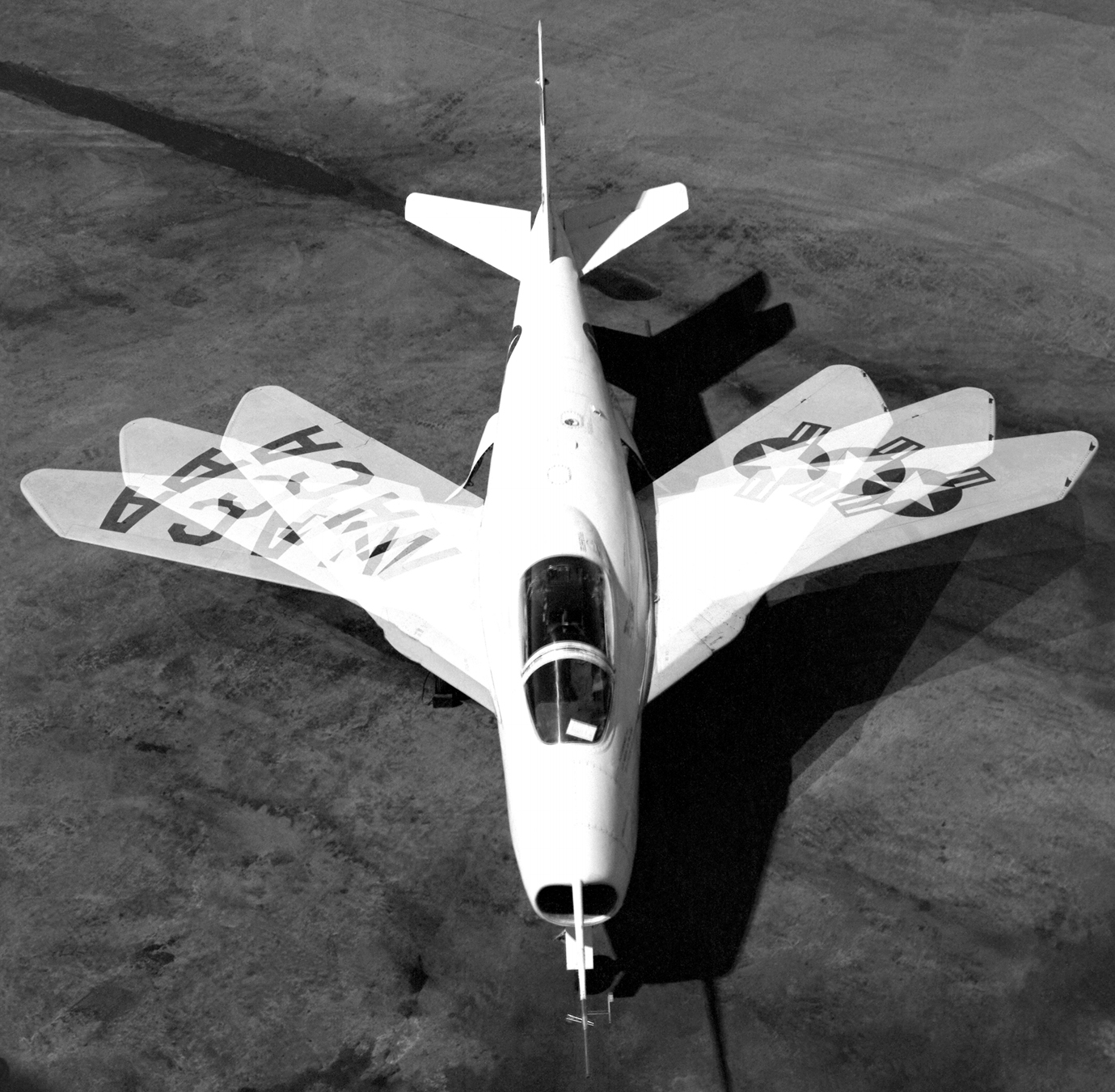
A composite photograph showing the Bell X-5’s variable-sweep wing

The Bell X-5 was the first aircraft capable of changing the sweep of its wings in flight. It was inspired by the untested wartime P.1101 design of the German Messerschmitt company. In a further development of the German design, which could only have its wing sweepback angle adjusted on the ground, the Bell engineers devised a system of electric motors to adjust the sweep in flight.

== Design and development ==
The Messerschmitt P.1101 V1 prototype was captured by United States troops in April 1945 from an experimental facility at Oberammergau, Germany. It was brought back to the United States, eventually being delivered to the Bell Aircraft factory at Buffalo, New York. Although incomplete and damaged in transit, company engineering staff studied the design closely. The P.1101 had a wing sweep that could be adjusted on the ground from 30, 40, to 45 degrees. However, this was for testing only and never intended as an operational feature. The Bell team, led by Chief Designer Robert J. Woods, submitted a proposal for a similar design, but with in-flight wing adjustment capability.

Although superficially similar, the X-5 was much more complex than the P.1101, with three sweep positions: 20°, 40° and 60°, creating an inflight "variable-geometry" platform. A jackscrew assembly moved the wing's hinge along a set of short horizontal rails, using disc brakes to lock the wing into its inflight positions. Moving from full extension to full sweep took less than 30 seconds. The articulation of the hinge and pivots partly compensated for the shifts in center of gravity and center of pressure as the wings moved.

Even so, the X-5 had vicious spin characteristics arising from the aircraft's flawed aerodynamic layout, particularly a poorly positioned tail and vertical stabilizer which, in some wing positions, could lead to an irrecoverable spin. This violent stall / spin instability would eventually cause the destruction of the second aircraft and the death of its Air Force test pilot in 1953.

The unfavorable spin characteristics also led to the cancellation of tentative plans by the United States Air Force to modify the X-5's design into a low-cost tactical fighter for NATO and other foreign countries.

== Operational history ==
Two X-5s were built (serial numbers 50-1838 and 50-1839). The first was completed 15 February 1951, and the two aircraft made their first flights on 20 June and 10 December 1951. Almost 200 flights were made at speeds up to Mach 0.9 and altitudes of 40,000 ft (12,000 m). One aircraft was lost on 13 October 1953, when it failed to recover from a spin at 60° sweepback. Air Force Maj. Raymond Popson died in the crash at Edwards Air Force Base. The other X-5 remained at Edwards and continued active testing until 1955, and remained in service as a chase plane until 1958.

The X-5 successfully demonstrated the advantage of a swing-wing design for aircraft intended to fly at a wide range of speeds. Despite the X-5's stability problems, the concept was developed to an outboard rather than inboard hinge, and was later successfully implemented in such aircraft as the General Dynamics F-111 and Grumman F-14 Tomcat, the Mikoyan Gurevich MiG-23 and MiG-27, the Sukhoi Su-17/20/22 and Su-24, the Tupolev Tu-22M and Tu-160, the Panavia Tornado and the Rockwell B-1 Lancer.

== Surviving aircraft ==
The sole surviving X-5 is now at the National Museum of the United States Air Force at Wright-Patterson Air Force Base near Dayton, Ohio. It was delivered to the museum in March 1958. It is displayed in the museum's Research & Development Hangar.

== Specifications (Bell X-5) ==
Orthographically projected diagram of the Bell X-5.

Data from The X-planes : X-1 to X-29

General characteristics

- Crew: 1
- Length: 33 ft 4 in (10.16 m)
- Wingspan: 33 ft 6 in (10.21 m)
- Swept wingspan: 20 ft 9 in (6.32 m) swept at 60° sweep
- Height: 12 ft 0 in (3.66 m)
- Wing area: 175 sq ft (16.3 m^{2})
- Airfoil: root: NACA 64A011; tip: NACA 64A08.28
- Empty weight: 6,350 lb (2,880 kg)
- Gross weight: 9,875 lb (4,479 kg)
- Powerplant: 1 × Allison J35-A-17A turbojet engine, 4,900 lbf (22 kN) thrust at sea level

Performance

- Maximum speed: 705 mph (1,135 km/h, 613 kn)
- Range: 750 mi (1,210 km, 650 nmi)
- Service ceiling: 42,000 ft (13,000 m)
- Thrust/weight: 0.5

== See also ==
Aircraft of comparable role, configuration, and era

- Grumman XF10F Jaguar
- Messerschmitt P.1101
- North American F-86 Sabre
- Saab 29 Tunnan
- Škoda-Kauba P14

Related lists

- List of experimental aircraft
- List of X-planes
