= Messerschmitt P.1101 =

German fighter prototype

P.1101
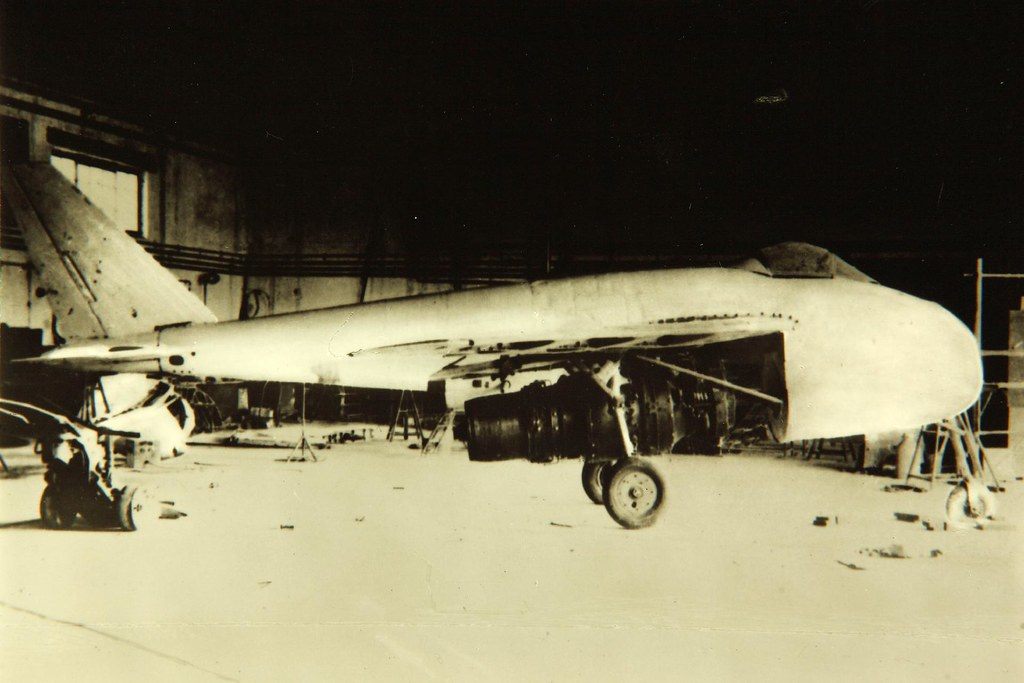
- The prototype in Oberammergau, 1945

General information
- Type: Fighter
- Manufacturer: Messerschmitt
- Primary user: Luftwaffe (intended)
- Number built: 1

History
- First flight: Never flown
- Developed from: P1100 Baubeshreibungen fur Bomber (bomber/zerstorer)
- Developed into: Messerschmitt P.1110

The Messerschmitt P.1101 was a single-seat, single-jet fighter project of World War II, developed as part of the 15 July 1944 Emergency Fighter Program which sought a second generation of jet fighters for the Third Reich. A prominent feature of the P.1101 prototype was that the sweep angle of the wings could be changed before flight, a feature further developed in later variable-sweep aircraft such as the Bell X-5 and Grumman XF10F Jaguar.

== Design and development ==
Within nine days of the 15 July 1944 issuance of design specifications for the Emergency Fighter, the Messerschmitt design bureau, under Dr. Woldemar Voigt, had formed a preliminary paper design for the P.1101. The aircraft which was developed initially had a short and wide fuselage, tricycle landing gear, and mid-mounted wings with an inner sweep of 40° near the fuselage, and a shallower 26° outboard. The single HeS 011 jet engine was to be mounted internally within the fuselage, being aspirated by two rounded intakes located on either side of the cockpit. The high tail was of a V configuration, and mounted on a tapered boom which extended over and past the jet exhaust, while the cockpit was forward-mounted, with the canopy integrated into the fuselage and forming part of the rounded nose of the aircraft.

By late August 1944, the design, still in paper form, had evolved into a sleeker incarnation, with the previously stout fuselage lengthened and narrowed with a conical nose section, added in front of the cockpit. The compound sweep wing was also abandoned, with the outer wing of the Me 262 instead being adapted. Proposals for a pulsejet and rocket combination, the P.1101L, were also put forth. The design was further developed, including a longer nose, and after wind tunnel testing of a number of wing and fuselage profiles, the decision was made to undertake the construction of a full-scale test aircraft. This finalized design and associated test data were submitted to the Construction Bureau on 10 November 1944 and the selection of production materials was begun on 4 December 1944.

On 28 February 1945, the RLM settled on a competing design, the Focke-Wulf Ta 183, as the winner of the Emergency Fighter program. This decision was based in part on the considerable design difficulties being encountered by the Messerschmitt P.1101 design team. For example, the cannon installation was proving too crowded, the mainwheel retraction and door mechanisms were too complex, the fuselage needed a great many "strong points" to deal with loads, and the anticipated performance had fallen below RLM specifications, due to increased weight.

=== Production prototype ===
Since considerable work had already been done on the P.1101 design, the RLM decided to continue reduced funding in order for Messerschmitt to carry out experimental flights, testing the swept back wing at anticipated speeds up to Mach 1. The worsening war situation led to the expedited, but risky, approach of building a full-scale prototype in parallel with detail construction and continuing statistical calculation, while existing components such as the wings (Me 262), landing gear (extended Bf 109), and flight components were utilized where feasible. It was also intended for the test flights to be conducted with 35, 40, and 45-degree wing sweep. Production of the V1 prototype was begun at Messerschmitt's Bavarian Oberammergau Complex with a projected first flight in June 1945.

The P.1101 V1 prototype was of duralumin fuselage construction, retaining the outer wing section of the Me 262, but with larger slats and, as mentioned previously, the wing sweep could be adjusted on the ground from 30, 40, to 45 degrees; this was for testing only and never intended as an operational feature. The fuselage-mounted tandem intakes of the preliminary designs were replaced by a single nose intake, and the canopy became a bubble design, which afforded better allround vision than the initial integrated canopy offered. The production prototype also incorporated a more conventional swept tail design, which was constructed out of wood and remained mounted on the tapered tailboom. A T-tail was also designed. The tricycle undercarriage consisted of a steerable, rearward-retracting nosewheel and long forward-retracting wing root-mounted main gear. The prototype was fitted with an apparently inoperable Heinkel He S 011 jet engine, but given the non-availability of this engine, a Jumo 004B was fitted for test flights. (Changing the type of engine was meant to be comparatively easy.) In addition, the production model was to be equipped with a pressurized cockpit and armored canopy, and to be armed with two or four 30 mm (1.2 in) MK 108 cannons, Ruhrstahl X-4 air-to-air missiles, or both.

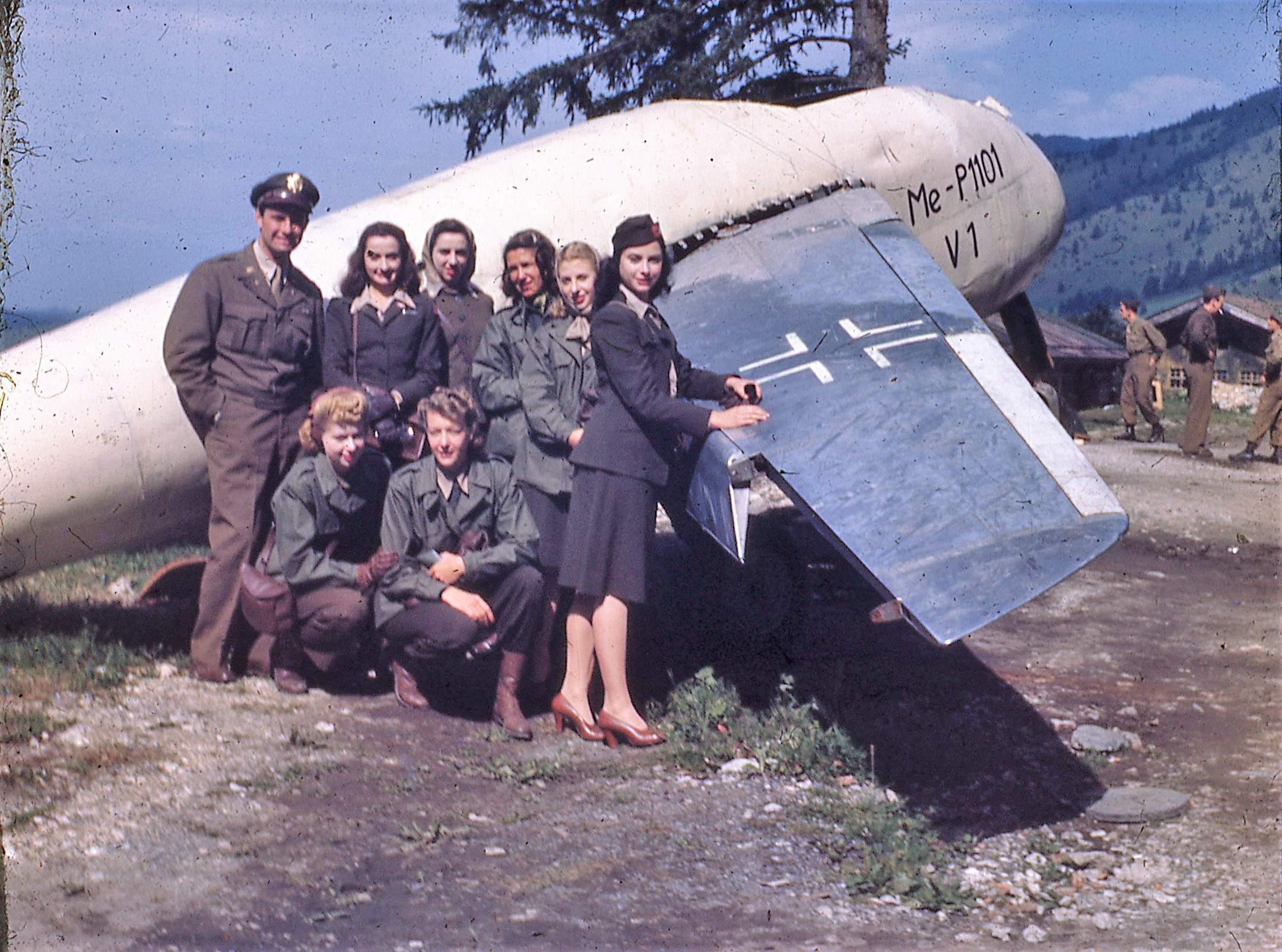
USO personnel posing in front of the P.1101 V1 prototype.

=== Postwar ===
By the time an American infantry unit discovered the Oberammergau complex on 29 April 1945, the V1 prototype was approximately 80% complete. The wings were not yet attached and appear to have never had skinning applied to their undersides. The airframe was removed from the nearby tunnel in which it was hidden and all associated documents were seized. There was some lobbying by Messerschmitt Chief Designer Woldemar Voigt and Robert J. Woods of Bell Aircraft to have the P.1101 V1 completed by June 1945, but this was precluded by the destruction of some critical documents and the refusal of the French to release the remaining majority of the design documents (microfilmed and buried by the Germans), which they had obtained prior to the arrival of American units to the area.

The airframe meanwhile became a favorite prop for GI souvenir photos. Later, the prototype was shipped first to Wright Patterson AFB, then to the Bell Aircraft Works in Buffalo, New York in 1948 where an Allison J35 engine was attached. Damage ruled out any possibility for repair although some of the Me P.1101's design features were subsequently used by Bell as the basis for the Bell X-5, which was the first aircraft capable of varying its wing geometry while in flight.

== Variants ==
=== Me P.1101 First Design ===
The 24 July 1944 design by Hans Hornung of a single-seat jet fighter. It was powered by one Heinkel He S 011 turbojet. This was the shortest of all versions with a blunt nose and a v-tail. It had a wingspan of 7.15 m and a length of 6.85 m. The armament was two MK 108 cannon.

=== Me P.1101 Second Design ===
A sleeker design, dating from 30 August 1944. Also a v-tailed single-seat jet fighter with a more pointed nose and wings swept back at 40 degrees. It had a wingspan of 8.16 m and a length of 9.37 m.

=== Me P.1101 Third Design ===
Full-scale prototype design of a flying test single-seat jet fighter with a wingspan of 8.06 m and a length of 8.98 m. It had a conventional tail and swept wings designed to be set at different angles while on the ground. Test flights were first intended to be undertaken with a 35-degree wing sweep, followed by a 45-degree sweep. The first test flight was to take place in June 1945.

=== Me P.1101 Fourth Design ===
The final single-seat jet fighter design that went into production with a wingspan of 8.25 m, a length of 9.175 m and a weight of 1250 kg (80% complete by war's end).

=== Me P.1101 L ===
A ramjet-powered single-seat fighter that would have eight additional small rocket engines for takeoff. This design would have a much wider fuselage covering the large Lorin ramjet located to the back of the cockpit, as well as a conventional tail.

=== Me P.1101/92 ===
A different design of a two-seat v-tailed heavy fighter and destroyer. It was an all-metal aircraft armed with a large 7.5 cm Pak 40 cannon and was powered by two Heinkel He S 011 turbojets. It had a wingspan of 13.28 m and a length of 13.1 m.

=== Me P.1101/99 ===
Another very different variant altogether. Two-seat attack/destroyer all-metal aircraft powered by four Heinkel He S 011 turbojets. It had the cockpit at the front end of the fuselage and was armed with a 7.5 cm Pak 40 cannon and one MK 112 55 mm autocannon in the nose, and four additional MK 112 in Schräge Musik configuration behind the cockpit. Its tail was of the conventional type and it had a wingspan of 15.4 m and a length of 15.2 m.

== Specifications (P.1101 fourth design 22 February 1945) ==
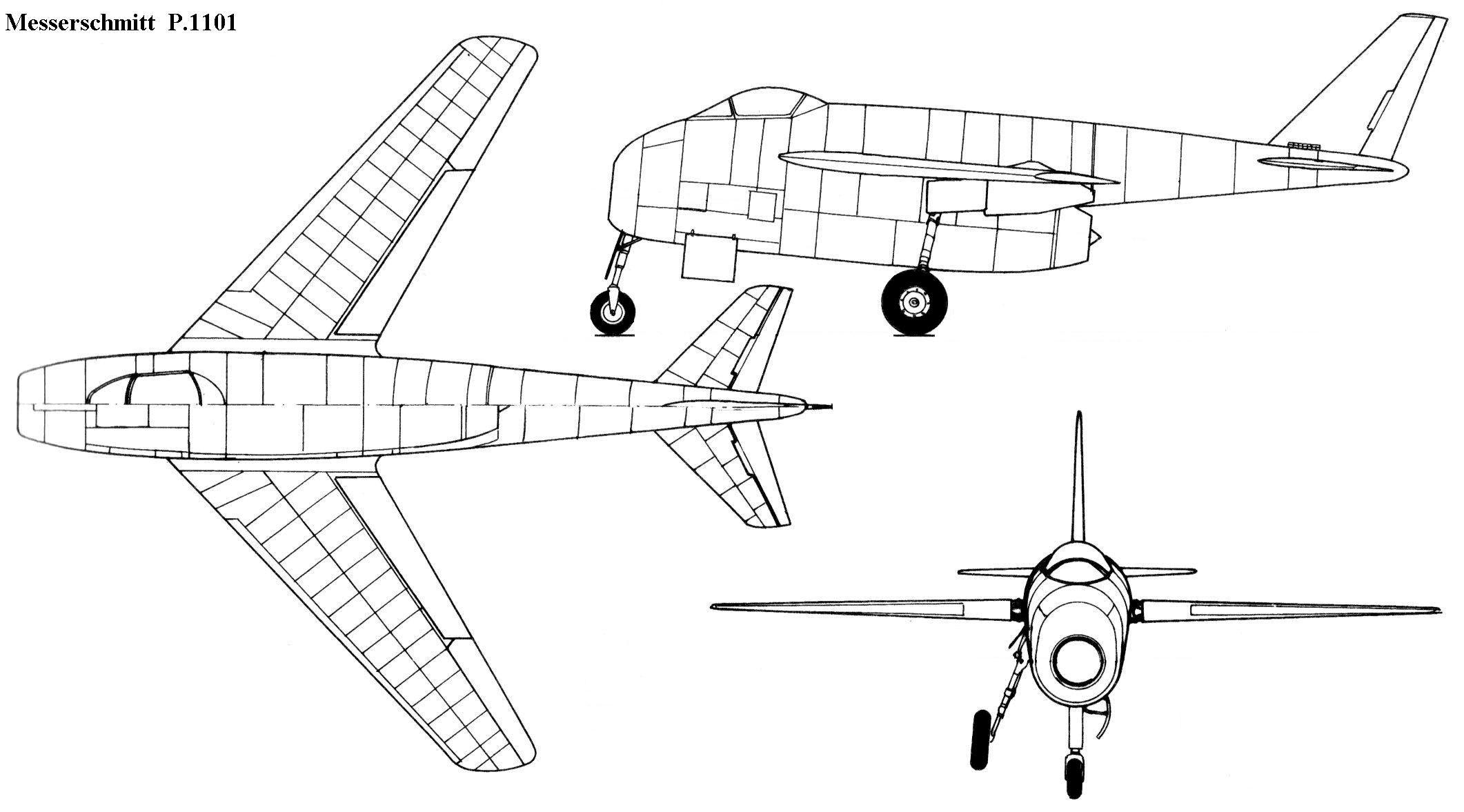
Messerschmitt P.1101

Data from Luftwaffe secret projects : fighters 1939–1945

General characteristics

- Crew: 1
- Length: 9.18 m (30 ft 1 in)
- Wingspan: 8.25 m (27 ft 1 in)
- Height: 3.71 m (12 ft 2 in)
- Wing area: 15.9 m^{2} (171 sq ft)
- Aspect ratio: 4.29
- Airfoil: root: NACA 00011.41-1.1-40; tip: NACA 00009-1.1-40
- Empty weight: 2,594 kg (5,719 lb)
- Gross weight: 4,065 kg (8,962 lb)
- Max takeoff weight: 4,500 kg (9,921 lb)
- Fuel capacity: 1,250 kg (2,756 lb) / 1,432 L (378 US gal; 315 imp gal)
- Powerplant: 1 × Heinkel HeS 011A turbojet engine, 12.01 kN (2,700 lbf) thrust

Performance

- Maximum speed: 980 km/h (610 mph, 530 kn) at 7,000 m (23,000 ft) (estimated)
- Maximum speed: Mach 0.8
- Cruise speed: 905 km/h (562 mph, 489 kn)
- Landing speed: 172 km/h (107 mph; 93 kn) (with ⅓ fuel aboard)
- Range: 1,500 km (930 mi, 810 nmi)
- Service ceiling: 14,000 m (46,000 ft)
- Rate of climb: 22.2 m/s (4,370 ft/min) at sea level
- Time to altitude: 10,000 m (33,000 ft) in 9 minutes 30 seconds
- Wing loading: 296.5 kg/m^{2} (60.7 lb/sq ft) maximum
- Take-off run: 709 m (775 yd)
- Landing run: 572 m (625 yd)

Armament

- Guns: 4 × 30mm MK 108 cannons on production aircraft
- Missiles: 4 × Ruhrstahl X-4 air-to-air missiles on production aircraft

== See also ==
Related development

- Messerschmitt Me P.1106

Aircraft of comparable role, configuration, and era

- Bell X-5
- Focke-Wulf Ta 183 Huckebein
- Grumman XF10F Jaguar
- Saab 29 Tunnan
- Short SB5

Related lists

- List of German aircraft projects, 1939–45
- List of World War II military aircraft of Germany
