= Focke-Wulf Ta 183 =

Jet powered interceptor concept aircraft

Ta 183 Huckebein
- Wind tunnel model

General information
- Type: Fighter/Interceptor
- Manufacturer: Focke-Wulf
- Status: Terminated by the end of the war
- Primary user: Luftwaffe
- Number built: None completed

History
- Developed into: Focke-Wulf Volksjäger, Focke-Wulf Super Lorin; FMA IAe 33 Pulqui II

The Focke-Wulf Ta 183 Huckebein was a design for a jet-powered fighter aircraft intended as the successor to the Messerschmitt Me 262 and other day fighters in Luftwaffe service during World War II. It had been developed only to the extent of wind tunnel models when the war ended, but the basic design was further developed postwar in Argentina as the FMA IAe 33 Pulqui II. The name Huckebein is a reference to a trouble-making raven (Hans Huckebein der Unglücksrabe) from an illustrated story in 1867 by Wilhelm Busch.

== Development ==
In early 1944, the Reich Air Ministry (RLM, for Reichsluftfahrtministerium) became aware of Allied jet developments, and were particularly concerned that they might have to face the Gloster Meteor over the continent. In response, they instituted the Emergency Fighter Program which took effect on July 3, 1944, ending production of most bomber and multi-role aircraft in favour of fighters, especially jet fighters. Additionally, they accelerated the development of experimental designs that would guarantee a performance edge over the Allied designs, designs that would replace the first German jet fighters, the Messerschmitt Me 262 Schwalbe and Heinkel He 162 Spatz.

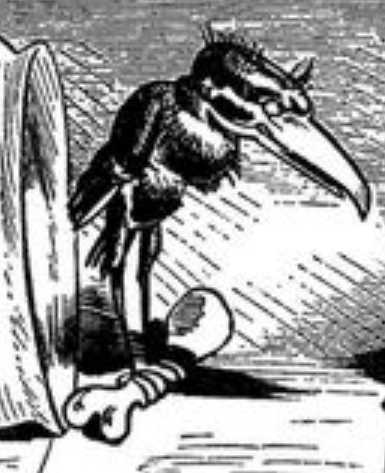
A menacing "Hans Huckebein", the namesake raven for the Ta 183

The result was a series of advanced designs, some using swept wings for improved transonic performance, others instead using the tailless design to lower drag to the same end. Since German aircraft engineers were aware that tailless designs might encounter serious stability problems at transonic speeds, much as the prototype Me 163B V18 did on July 6, 1944, in hitting a record 1,130 km/h (702 mph) top speed and nearly destroying its entire rudder surface in the process, a variety of stabilization methods such as airbrakes on the wings were considered for such aircraft or simply adding conventional tail surfaces. Kurt Tank's design team led by Hans Multhopp designed in 1945 a fighter known as "Huckebein" (from Wilhelm Busch's "Hans Huckebein, the unlucky raven", a cartoon raven that traditionally makes trouble for others), also known as Project V (Project VI in some references) or Design II at Focke-Wulf. The raven character itself was re-used for the modern Bundeswehr's Lufttransportgeschwader 62 as the inspiration for their unit's insignia.

== Design ==
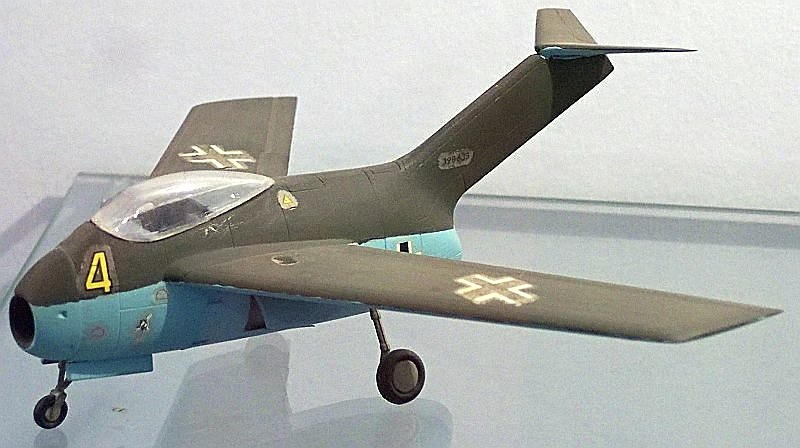
Focke-Wulf Ta 183 Design II model

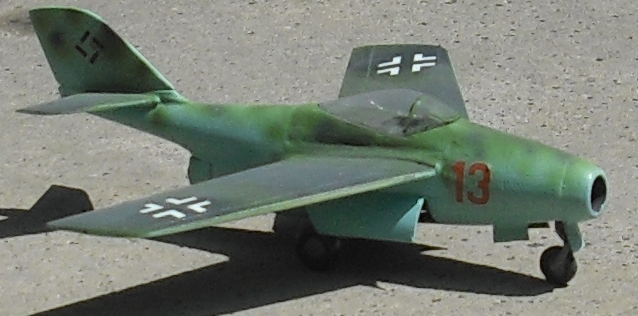
Final Ta 183 Design III model

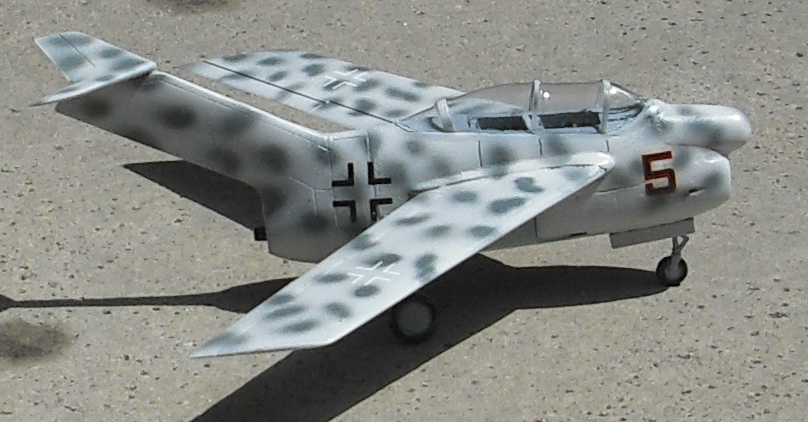
Ta 183 B model

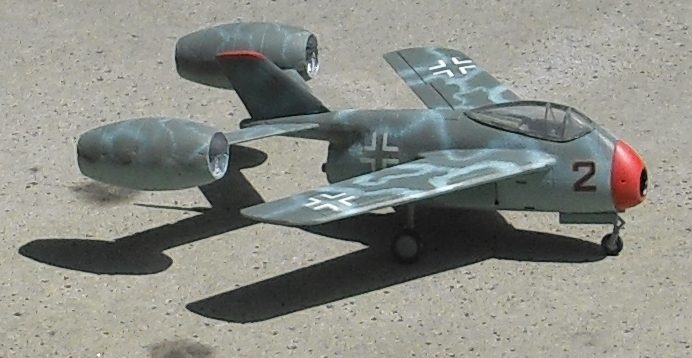
Fw Super-Lorin model

Development of the Ta 183 started as early as 1942 as Project VI, when the engineer Hans Multhopp assembled a team to design a new fighter, based on his understanding that previous Focke-Wulf design studies for jet fighters had no chance of reaching fruition because none had the potential for transonic speeds. This aircraft, bearing the RLM airframe number 8-183, was intended to use, as with a growing number of other advanced German late-war jet aircraft proposals, the advanced Heinkel HeS 011 turbojet; although the first prototypes were to be powered by the Junkers Jumo 004B. Early studies also included an optional 1,000 kgf (10 kN) thrust rocket engine for takeoff and combat boost, much as the special "003R" version of the BMW 003 jet engine was meant to use, with fuel and oxidiser for up to 200 seconds of burn time stored in drop tanks under the wings.

The wings were swept back at 40° and were mounted in the mid-fuselage position. The wings appear to be mounted very far forward compared with most designs, a side-effect of attempting to keep the centre of pressure (CoP) of the wing as a whole as close to the middle of the fuselage as possible. Reflecting the dilemma of a shortage of strategic materials, the first option of using aluminum in the construction of the main spar consisting of two tapered I-beams attached together on the top and bottom with shear webs of thin steel sheeting, led to a reappraisal. Multhopp chose to use wood instead of metal throughout the wing structure, with wood structure ribs attached to the front and back of the I-beams to give the wing its overall shape, and then covered with plywood. The box-like structure contained six fuel cells, giving the aircraft a total fuel load of 1,565 L (413 US gal).

The original design used a T-tail, with a notably long vertical stabilizer and a seemingly undersized horizontal stabilizer. The vertical stabilizer was swept back at 60°, and the horizontal stabilizer was swept back and slightly dihedralled. The horizontal stabilizer also featured two large trim tabs, the main pitching force actually being provided by what would have appeared to be "ailerons" on most other turbojet-powered fighter airframes of the period. The Ta 183 wing's outermost trailing-edge control surfaces on its wing panels, were well behind the center of gravity, placing their trailing edges' tips virtually even, horizontally, with the intended HeS 011 jet engine's exhaust orifice, and thus could provide both pitch and roll control through functioning as elevon control surfaces, as those on the wing panels of Messerschmitt's Me 163 tailplane-less Komet rocket fighter already did. Many problems beset the project, including the chance of a Dutch roll. Work therefore concentrated on the much less problematic Focke-Wulf Project VII. However, when the RLM eventually rejected that design, Huckebein was again brought to the fore.

The Ta 183 had a short fuselage with the air intake passing under the cockpit and proceeding to the rear where the single engine was located. The pilot sat in a pressurized cockpit with a bubble canopy which provided excellent vision. The primary armament of the aircraft consisted of four 30 mm (1.18 in) MK 108 cannons arranged around the air intake.

It was also possible to carry a bomb load of 500 kg (1,100 lb), consisting of one SD or more SC 500 half-tonne bombs, one Bombentorpedo BT 200 bomb, five SD-series fragmentation bombs, SC-series general-purpose bombs, or a Rb 20/30 reconnaissance camera. The weapons load would be carried in the equipment space in the bottom of the fuselage and thus partially protrude about halfway from the fuselage, possibly allowing for other armament packages such as the Ruhrstahl X-4 wire-guided missile.

Multhopp's team also seriously explored a second version of the basic design, known as Design III, a modified Design II (it is unknown what Design I referred to). The first of these had only minor modifications, with slightly differently shaped wingtips and repositioning of the undercarriage. The second version had a reduced sweepback to 32°, allowing the wing and cockpit to be moved rearward. The tail was also redesigned, using a short horizontal boom to mount the control surfaces just above the line of the rear fuselage. This version looks considerably more "conventional" to the modern eye, although somewhat stubby due to the short overall length of the HeS 011.

The second of these two schemes was entered in the official competition ordered by the Oberkommando der Luftwaffe at the end of 1944. On 28 February 1945, the Luftwaffe High Command examined the various Emergency Fighter proposals and selected the Junkers EF 128 to be developed and produced; the Focke-Wulf team gained second place. However, in the last few weeks of the war, it was decided that the Huckebein was really the best design and, at a meeting in Bad Eilsen, Tank was told to arrange mockups and to plan for full production. It had a planned speed of about 1,000 km/h (620 mph) at 7,000 m (22,970 ft) and it was estimated that 300 aircraft per month would be delivered when production got into its stride, each aircraft being produced in 2,500 man hours.

A total of 16 prototypes were to be built, allowing the tail unit to be interchanged between the Design II and III variations. Of the Versuchs (experimental test series) aircraft, the Ta 183 V1-V3 were to be powered by the Jumo 004B turbojet with somewhat lengthened rear fuselages near the engine's exhaust nozzle to accommodate them, pending delivery of the HeS 011 jet engine. The Ta 183 V4-V14 were intended to be A-0 series pre-production aircraft and V15-V16 were to be static test aircraft. The first flight of the aircraft was projected for May 1945, but no finished Ta 183 Versuchs-series prototypes had been completed by 8 April 1945, when British troops captured the Focke-Wulf facilities.

=== Influence ===
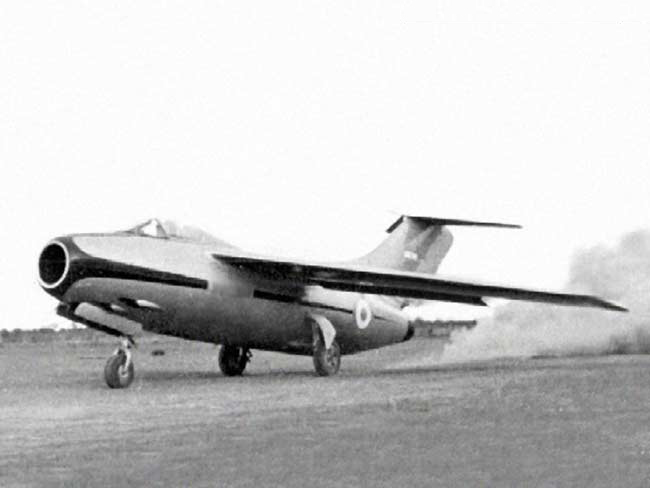
Pulqui II on takeoff

After the end of the war, Kurt Tank worked with a team of Argentine engineers lad by Ing. Norberto Morchio on a jet fighter for use by the Fuerza Aérea Argentina that resembled the Ta 183 project, resulting in the IAe Pulqui II. The Pulqui II differed in some respects from the Ta 183's original design, being modified to place the wings at a shoulder-mounted position in order to avoid a heavy fuselage spar pass-through structure going around the engine; this resulted in deep stall problems at high angles of attack. This could be resolved, and a version correcting these problems was planned, however, the financial crash of 1953 and the fall of Juan Peron delayed work on the project. By the end of 1960, the project had been abandoned due to the availability of surplus ex-Korean War F-86 Sabres at a fraction of the cost.

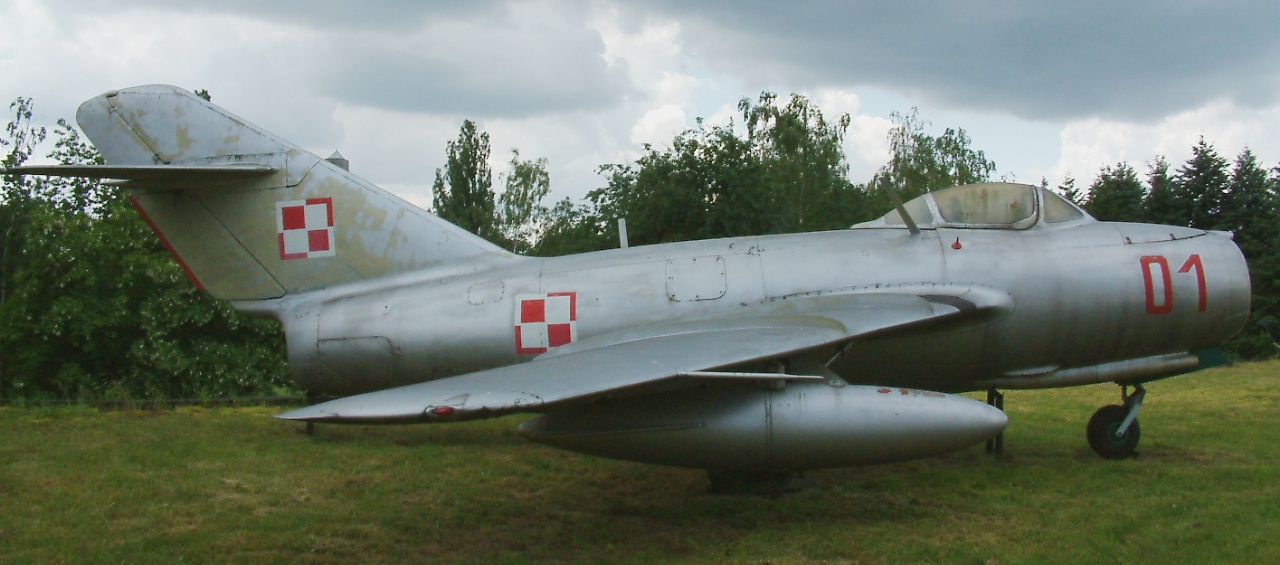
The MiG-15, which bears a resemblance to both the Ta 183 and Me 263.

Historians including David Myrha have claimed the Soviet Mikoyan-Gurevich MiG-15 was at least inspired by the Ta 183, because the Soviets captured plans from the Germans at the end of World War II. The MiG-15 does bear a resemblance in layout, sharing the high tailplane and nose-mounted intake, although the aircraft are different in structure, details, and proportions. The MiG-15's design shared features, and some appearance commonalities with the MiG design bureau's own 1945-46 attempt at a Soviet-built rocket interceptor similar to the Messerschmitt Me 263 rocket fighter, and also common to many contemporary jet fighters — and were derived from aerodynamic and structural considerations (for example, the American Republic F-84F, the Swedish SAAB 29, and the French Dassault Ouragan and Mystère). A detailed design history of the MiG-15 was published by Russian aviation historian Yefim Gordon refuting any connection between the Ta 183 and the MiG-15. According to the designers, the MiG-15 was an indigenous design, their choice of swept wings (as swept-back wings of any sort on a Soviet-designed aircraft were first flown on the MiG-8 Utka canard light aircraft of 1945) being due to their desire to move ahead of most Western designs which were not intended for the 960 km/h+ (600 mph+) speed range.

Like the MiG-9 and MiG-15, the Saab 29 is subject to claims of having been indirectly influenced by the Ta 183. SAAB engineers received German research studies in swept wings in the immediate post-war period via contacts in Switzerland, and incorporated it into the Tunnan design, which was still limited to paper studies at the time.

== Specifications (Ta 183, as originally designed) ==

Data from Jet Planes of the Third Reich

General characteristics

- Crew: 1
- Length: 9.4 m (30 ft 10 in)
- Wingspan: 10 m (32 ft 10 in)
- Height: 3.86 m (12 ft 8 in)
- Wing area: 22.5 m^{2} (242 sq ft)
- Empty weight: 2,830 kg (6,239 lb)
- Gross weight: 4,300 kg (9,480 lb)
- Powerplant: 1 × Heinkel HeS 011 turbojet, 13 kN (2,900 lbf) thrust

Performance

- Maximum speed: 955 km/h (593 mph, 516 kn)
- Service ceiling: 14,000 m (46,000 ft)
- Rate of climb: 20.4 m/s (4,020 ft/min)
- Wing loading: 196 kg/m^{2} (40 lb/sq ft)
- Thrust/weight: 0.37

Armament

- Guns: 4 × 30 mm (1.18 in) MK 108 cannon
- Hardpoints: 4
- Missiles: 4 × Ruhrstahl X-4 Wire Guided AAMs
- Bombs: 500 kg (1,102 lb) of bombs

== See also ==
Related development

- Focke-Wulf Flitzer
- Focke-Wulf Super Lorin
- Focke-Wulf Volksjäger
- Focke-Wulf Ta 283
- FMA IAe 33 Pulqui II

Aircraft of comparable role, configuration, and era

- Lavochkin La-15
- Mikoyan-Gurevich MiG-15
- Messerschmitt Me P.1101
- Saab 29 Tunnan
