= Hans Multhopp =

German aerospace engineer (1913–1972)

- Hans Multhopp, holding a model of the Ta 183
- Born: 17 May 1913; Alfeld, Germany
- Died: 30 October 1972 (aged 59); Cincinnati, Ohio, U.S.
- Education: University of Göttingen
- Engineering career
- Projects: Focke-Wulf Ta 183; Martin XB-51
- Significant design: Martin SV-5

Hans Multhopp (17 May 1913 – 30 October 1972) was a German aeronautical engineer/designer. Receiving a degree from the University of Göttingen, Multhopp worked with the famous designer Kurt Tank at the Focke-Wulf Flugzeugbau AG during World War II, and was the leader of the team responsible for the design of the Focke-Wulf Ta 183 lightweight jet fighter, which was the winner of the 1945 Emergency Fighter Competition. Emigrating to the United Kingdom after the war, he assisted in the advancement of British aeronautic science before moving to the United States, where his work for Martin Marietta on lifting bodies provided aerodynamic experience that proved instrumental in the development of the Space Shuttle.

== Early life ==
Born in 1913, Multhopp studied at the Technische Hochschule in Hannover, before transferring to the University of Göttingen in 1934. Studying there under the guidance of the famed aerodynamicist Ludwig Prandtl, who regarded him as his best student, Multhopp assisted in the design and construction of several gliders while working on a thesis on the subject of wing aerodynamics. During his time at the university, he also participated in experiments under the aegis of the Aerodynamische Versuchsanstalt (AVA), the German counterpart to the American National Advisory Committee for Aeronautics. In 1937, Multhopp was placed in charge of one of AVA's wind tunnels. More importantly he had already published a seminal paper on wing-lift theory and before he had fulfilled his doctoral requirements, his work had attracted the interest of other German aviation concerns. Consequently, Multhopp was approached by Kurt Tank in 1938, who offered him employment at Focke-Wulf.

== World War II ==
At Focke-Wulf, Multhopp was promoted to assistant in charge of the aerodynamics department in 1940, then was promoted to advanced design bureau chief in 1943. One of his innovative projects during this time was the Multhopp-Klappe, a combined flap and dive brake apparatus, which was installed on the unsuccessful Focke-Wulf Fw 191. During flight testing of the Fw 191, when deployed, the Multhopp-Klappe caused severe flutter.

In 1944, in collaboration with Tank and his design team, Multhopp was assigned to a research project to meet and exceed the specifications of the Reichsluftfahrtministerium (RLM)'s Emergency Fighter Competition for a single-seat jet-powered fighter intended for performance at high-altitude. His design of the diminutive Ta 183 Huckebein (German: Hunchback), itself named for a trouble-making raven (Hans Huckebein der Unglücksrabe) from an illustrated story in 1867 by Wilhelm Busch. The Ta 183's flying surface design was distinguished by a 40˚ swept-wing and T-tail (characterized as the "Multhopp T-tail", whose "elevator" surfaces were only used for "elevator trim" - the ailerons were actually used as elevons, due to the wings' sweepback placing them laterally opposite the jet engine exhaust) was the winner of the Luftwaffe's 1945 Emergency Fighter Program. However, due to the deteriorating war situation, delays in development meant that only wind tunnel models had been completed by the time of Germany's surrender.

A wind tunnel model of the Ta 183

Although David Myhra among other historians claim that the post-war Soviet MiG-15 was based on the Ta 183, modern experts in Russian and Soviet aviation history such as Yefim Gordon reject this, although acknowledging that some of the captured data from Multhopp's design work was examined by Artem Mikoyan and Mikhail Gurevich in the formative study of contemporary research. The swept-wing data that was amassed at Focke Wulf was, however, utilized by the Saab design office in its preliminary work that led to the Saab J29 fighter. A member of the Saab engineering team had been allowed to review German aeronautical documents stored in Switzerland. These files captured by the Americans in 1945 clearly indicated delta and swept-wing designs had the effect of "reducing drag dramatically as the aircraft approached the sound barrier." Although more sophisticated than the Ta 183, the Saab J 29 has more than a superficial link to the earlier German fighter project.

== Post-war ==
Post-war, Tank and most of his team left Germany to go to work in Argentina, where the Ta 183 would be developed into the FMA IAe 33 Pulqui II. Beginning in 1947, 62 of the technical staff along with a small group of test pilots followed Tank to reestablish themselves at the Fábrica Militar de Aviones at Córdoba. Multhopp was the only prominent engineer of the team who did not follow Tank, however, desiring to "move out of the shadow" of his mentor. Instead, Multhopp had chosen to emigrate to the United Kingdom in 1945, where he was quickly employed by the Royal Aircraft Establishment (RAE) at Farnborough. Aerodynamicist Martin Winter, Multhopp's assistant at Focke Wulf, accompanied his former team leader to RAE Farnborough.

During four years spent working at Farnborough, Multhopp and Winter's studies of swept-wing planforms resulted in the design of a unique high-speed research aircraft to be powered by the Rolls-Royce AJ65 Avon. The salient features included jettisonable wheels (landing was achieved with a retractable skid landing gear), a prone pilot position in the nose with the cockpit enclosure centered in the nose (four windows framed the circular intake), a T-tail and mid-mounted swept-wing, swept at 40˚. The RAE supersonic research vehicle designed in 1947–1948 and intended for speeds up Mach 1.24 at 36,000 ft, may have inspired parts of the design of "Teddy" Petter's Lightning fighter. The RAE project was not funded and remained a moribund "paper project." In addition, Multhopp also developed a theory for calculating the lift distribution of wings at subsonic speeds.

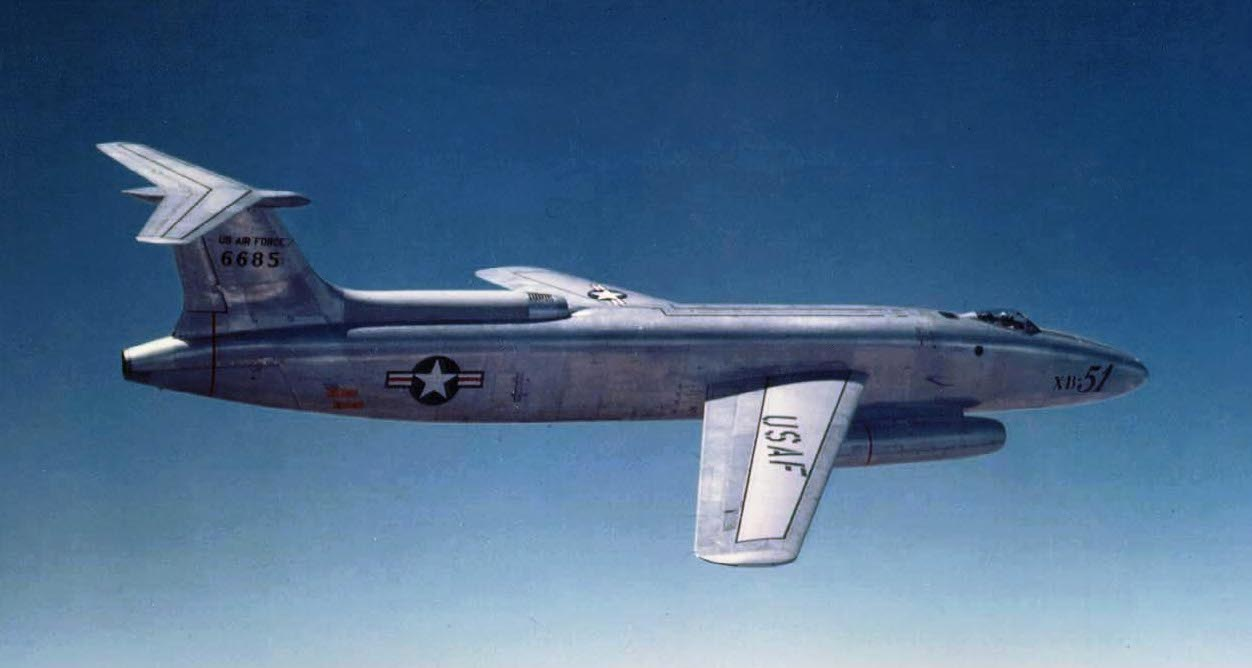
Martin XB-51, first prototype, 46-685 during testing

In 1949, the Glenn L. Martin Company (later Martin Marietta) of Essex, Maryland made efforts to recruit Multhopp to their staff of aeronautical engineers. These efforts proved successful, and he left his position at Farnborough to emigrate to the United States.

At Martin, he assisted in the design of the XB-51 medium bomber, the design of which reflected his work in swept wing design and T-tail aerodynamics, and by 1963, he had been promoted to the position of chief scientist at Martin. In this position, as part of a U.S. Air Force contract for the development of a full-scale model of a high-volume lifting body design for crewed spaceflight, he developed the "SV-5" aircraft.

The SV-5, the centerpiece of the START (Spacecraft Technology and Advanced Reentry Tests) project, was promoted by Multhopp as superior to NASA's M2 and HL-10 lifting body shapes, having a better lift-to-drag ratio and greater re-entry cross-range capability, along with better aerodynamics and improved design efficiency.

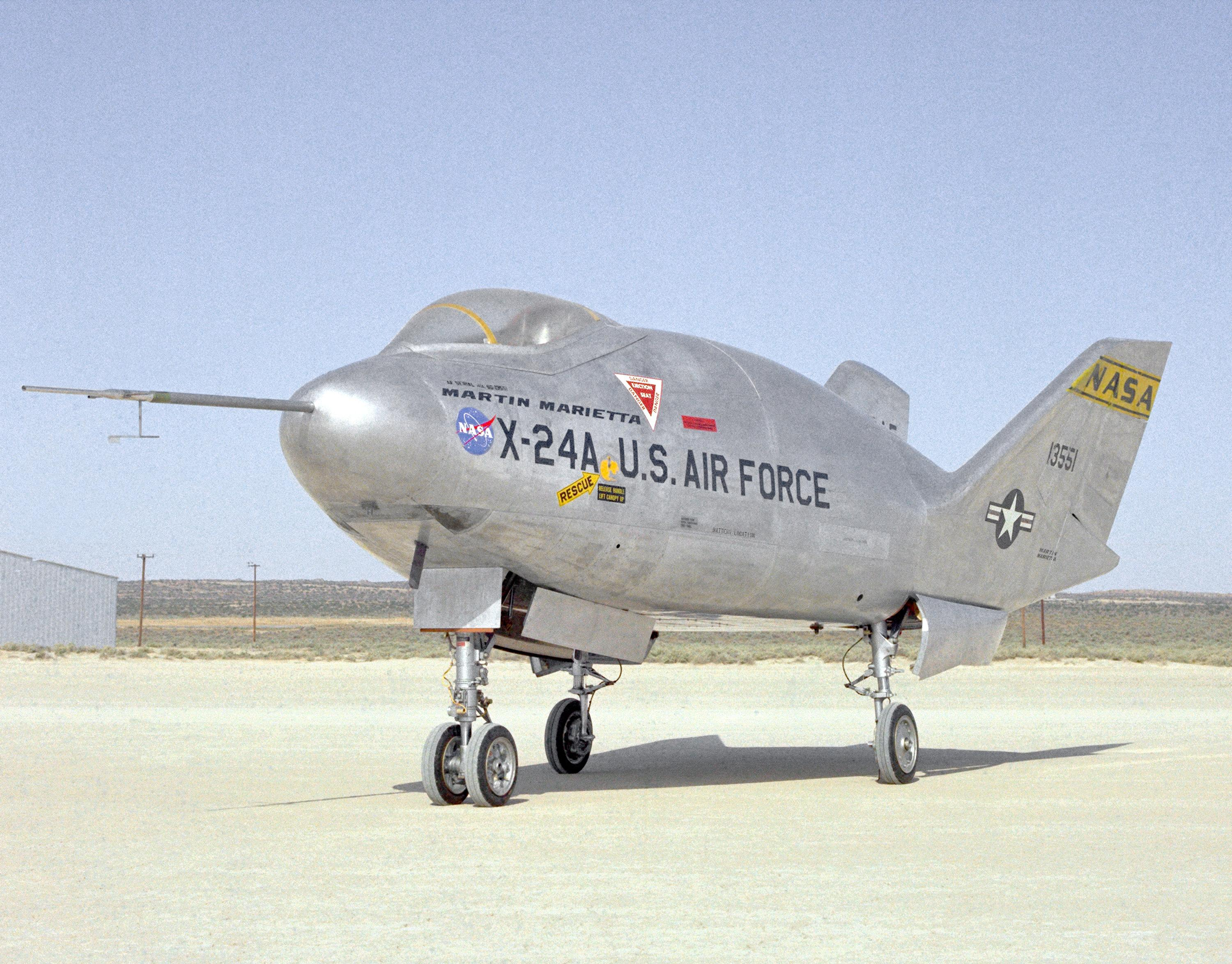
The X-24, based on the SV-5 body shape

Developed into the X-24, Multhopp's design proved successful, and provided valuable flight test information that assisted the design of NASA's Space Shuttle. Multhopp himself, however, faded from public view in the mid- to late-1960s. However, he continued to be active in aeronautical design, a 1966 paper challenging the view that tactical aircraft necessarily required greater and greater speed to be effective, and proposing a close air support aircraft armed with a heavy gun for anti-tank operations to Martin management, which was not pursued.

== Family influence on chess ==
In 1974, Multhopp's son, also named Hans, invented "Checkers chess", a chess variant in which pieces cannot move backwards until they have reached the far side of the board (another game by the same name was proposed by V. R. Parton). In 2014 at the age of 59, Hans won the Ohio Championship. He also holds the title of FIDE Master.
