= Grumman XF10F Jaguar =

Prototype aircraft in the US Navy

XF10F Jaguar
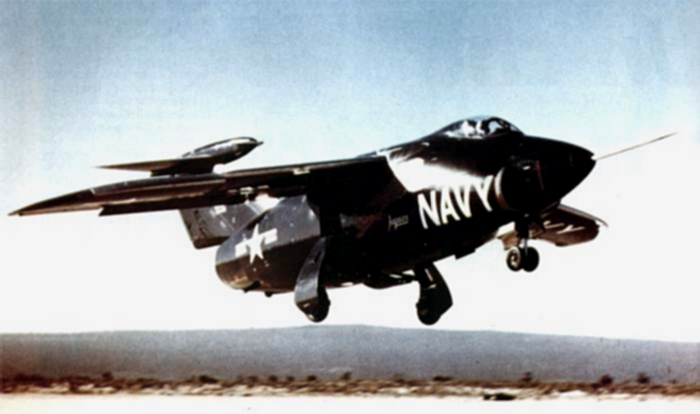

General information
- Type: Prototype swing-wing fighter aircraft
- Manufacturer: Grumman
- Status: Canceled in April 1953
- Number built: 1

History
- First flight: 19 May 1952

The Grumman XF10F Jaguar was a prototype swing-wing fighter aircraft offered to the United States Navy in the early 1950s. Although it never entered service, its research paved the way toward the later General Dynamics F-111 and Grumman's own F-14 Tomcat.

== Design and development ==
The Navy's interest in the variable-geometry wing was based on concerns that the ever-increasing weight of its jet fighters was making aircraft carrier operations troublesome. Many of its existing aircraft already had marginal carrier performance, and the trend in weight growth was obviously upward. At the same time, the demands for high-speed performance demanded swept wing layouts that did not lend themselves to good takeoff characteristics. The prospect of combining the two in a single aircraft was enticing.

Originally conceived as a swept-wing version of the earlier F9F Panther, in February–March 1948, the design was reconfigured with a T-tail and ultimately a variable-geometry wing. It featured a T-tail, with the horizontal stabilator, a small pivoting center body with a delta servo control at the nose and a larger rear delta main wing, mounted atop the vertical fin. The single turbojet engine was fed by cheek intakes. The high, shoulder-mounted wing could be moved to two positions: a 13.5° sweep for takeoff and landing and a 42.5° sweep for high-speed flight.

The unique horizontal stabilizer design was free-floating; the attached small foreplane was directly controlled by the pilot and pulled the stabilizer up or down; so, it was aerodynamically, not mechanically controlled, and this resulted in sluggish pitch control, increasingly so at low speeds where airflow over the small foreplane was lessened, and if the project had developed further, it probably would have been replaced by a conventional all-flying tailplane. The unpredictable behavior of the design often caused pilot-induced oscillations, with the sudden and erratic deployment of leading edge slats causing the aircraft to be nearly uncontrollable much of the time.

The XF10F-1 was not armed, but production aircraft would likely have had four 20 mm (.79 in) cannon and pylons for bombs and rockets, like other contemporary Navy fighters.

== Testing ==
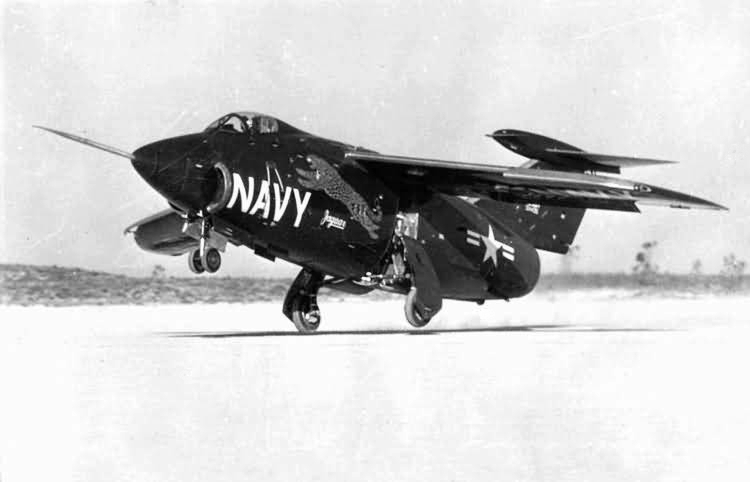
XF10F Jaguar

The Jaguar's configuration presented many of the same handling problems as the earlier Bell X-5 experimental aircraft, with some vicious spin characteristics.

The Jaguar's development was hampered by its use of the chronically unreliable Westinghouse J40 turbojet, which, as on other aircraft of this period, made the Jaguar dangerously underpowered and prone to various engine-related problems. The J40 developed only 6,800 lbf (30.2 kN) thrust rather than the anticipated 11,000 lbf (49 kN), and its troubles ultimately proved to be insurmountable.

Test pilot Corwin "Corky" Meyer, the only pilot to fly the Jaguar, described it as entertaining to fly "because there was so much wrong with it." Examples of the "wrongness" encountered by Meyer during the test flight program included:

- Jamming of the wing sweep mechanism as hydraulic fluid congealed into a gelatinous state from poor maintenance, resulting in a substance with "a consistency of Jell-O". Despite this failure, the aerodynamicist's assertion that the wing would unsweep itself in case of a mechanical failure proved entirely correct, to Meyer's relief.
- Regular inflight failures of the equally experimental Westinghouse XJ-40 turbojet. The reason for its unreliability within the Jaguar was traced ultimately to an extraordinary case of sloppy manufacture; an engine electronics box access panel had a screw nearly 5 in (127 mm) long mangling the delicate circuits within, in sharp contrast to the other three panel screws which were barely .4 in (10 mm) long.
- The "aerodynamically balanced" canard-actuated pendulum elevator, whose ineffectiveness and poor contribution to stability was already apparent in free-flight development models. The instability was dismissed as a "model effect", but this proved to be a fallacious judgement. Initial fixes consisted of a set of triangular horizontal fins on the rear fuselage, but ultimately Grumman admitted defeat and retroactively fitted the horizontal surfaces from the earlier Grumman F-9 Cougar swept-wing fighter. By this time the program was nearing its end, and it was at this stage unlikely that the U.S. Navy would adopt the Jaguar.
- During a flight the canopy opened and could not be closed, nor could it be ejected. At the same time, the less-than-trustworthy engine began losing power at an alarming rate, but, due to the problems with the canopy, Corky Meyer could not eject. He did manage to land safely. It was just after this flight that the aforementioned grossly oversized screw was found.

He found the translating wing-sweep mechanism, similar to the Bell X-5's, (which was much more complicated than the one later adopted by the F-111, F-14 and Panavia Tornado et al.), to be the only feature that worked flawlessly. The Navy was not encouraged by the results, and the development of larger carriers with angled flight decks and steam-driven catapults made the swing-wing configuration unnecessary.

The prototype XF10F-1 first flew on 19 May 1952. It was used for some 32 test flights throughout the year, but in April 1953, the Navy canceled the program, and with it, the 112 production aircraft that had been ordered. The sole flying aircraft and the uncompleted second prototype were shipped to Naval Air Material Center in Philadelphia for barricade testing, and the static test aircraft was later used as a gunnery target.

== Specifications (XF10F-1) ==
General characteristics

- Crew: one pilot
- Length: 55 ft 9.6 in (17.008 m)
- Wingspan: 50 ft 8 in (15.44 m)
- Swept wingspan: 36 ft 8 in (11.18 m) swept
- Height: 16 ft 3 in (4.95 m)
- Wing area: 466.9 sq ft (43.38 m^{2}) spread, 450 sq ft (42 m^{2}) swept
- Empty weight: 20,425 lb (9,265 kg)
- Max takeoff weight: 35,450 lb (16,080 kg)
- Powerplant: 1 × Westinghouse XJ40-WE-8 turbojet, 6,800 lbf (30 kN) thrust

Performance

- Maximum speed: 710 mph (1,140 km/h, 620 kn)
- Range: 1,670 mi (2,690 km, 1,450 nmi)
- Thrust/weight: 0.19

== See also ==
Related development

- Grumman F9F Panther

Aircraft of comparable role, configuration, and era

- Bell X-5

Related lists

- List of fighter aircraft
- List of United States Navy aircraft designations (pre-1962)
- List of military aircraft of the United States
