= FMA IAe 33 Pulqui II =

Argentine experimental jet fighter

IAe 33 Pulqui II
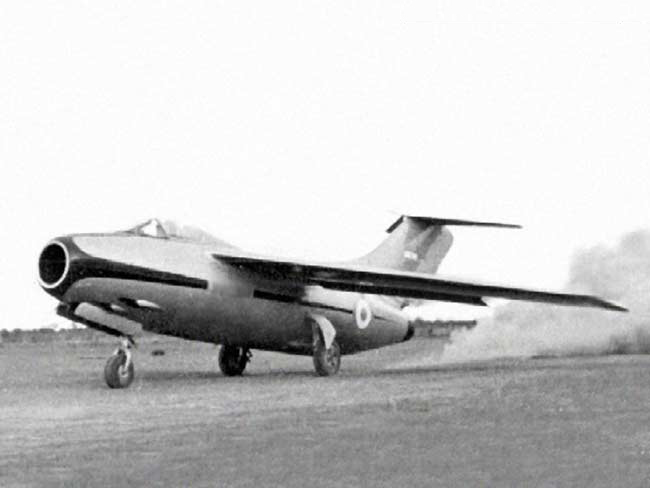
- Pulqui II (No. 02) c. 1950

General information
- Type: Fighter/Interceptor
- Manufacturer: Fábrica Militar de Aviones
- Designer: Instituto Aerotécnico; N. Morchio; H. Ricciardi; Kurt Tank
- Status: Cancelled
- Primary user: Argentine Air Force
- Number built: 1 static prototype + 4 flying prototypes

History
- First flight: 27 June 1950

The FMA IAe 33 Pulqui II (in the indigenous language Mapuche, Pulqúi: Arrow) was a jet fighter aircraft designed by Kurt Tank in the late 1940s in Argentina, under the Perón government, and built by the Fábrica Militar de Aviones (FMA).

Embodying many of the design elements of the wartime Focke-Wulf Ta 183, an unrealized fighter project, the FMA envisioned the IAe 33 Pulqui II as a successor to the postwar Gloster Meteor F4 in service with the Fuerza Aérea Argentina. The Pulqui II's development was comparatively problematic and lengthy, with two of the four prototypes being lost in fatal crashes. Despite one of the prototypes being successfully tested in combat during the 1955 Revolución Libertadora, the political, economic and technical challenges faced by the project meant that the IAe 33 was unable to reach its full potential, and the Argentine government ultimately chose to purchase F-86 Sabres from the United States in lieu of continuing development of the indigenous fighter to production status.

== Background ==
A wind tunnel model of the Ta 183 Huckebein

In the late 1940s, Argentina benefited from the recruitment of prominent German aerospace scientists and engineers, fleeing Europe following the defeat of the Nazis and seeking sanctuary in Latin America. The first group of these refugees had also included French designer Émile Dewoitine, punished as a collaborator in his homeland, who headed the IAe 27 Pulqui I experimental fighter program with Argentine engineers Juan Ignacio San Martín, Enrique Cardeilhac, Norberto L. Morchio, Humberto Ricciardi, sixteen draftsmen and forty workers. The Pulqui I was the first jet aircraft designed and built in Latin America. The prototype made its first flight from the Escuela Militar de Paratroopers (Córdoba) on 9 August 1947, piloted by First Lieutenant Edmundo Osvaldo Weiss.

The experimental plane presented, during the test flights, a series of problems such as the high fuel consumption of the English turbine, which limited its autonomy. This and other factors, plus rapid global advances in aerodynamics (such as swept wings and laminar airfoils, among others), determined that the program was ultimately cancelled. However, the experience gained drove the progress of the national aeronautical industry, which became the eighth in the world to venture into this type of technology and paved the way for more ambitious projects such as the IA-33 Pulqui II.

The Aerotechnical Institute (Spanish: Instituto Aerotécnico), under the leadership of Morchio, persevered with its efforts to build a successful indigenous jet fighter and, at first, attempted to modify the earlier aircraft. When it became apparent that the Pulqui I had little potential for further development, the Aerotechnical Institute initiated a new design utilizing the more powerful (20.31 kN (4,570 lb_{f})) Rolls-Royce Nene II turbojet engine. In early 1948, the Institute completed a scale model of what it called the IAe-27a Pulqui II. This design featured trapezoidal wings, swept back at an angle of 33°, and used a NACA 16009 laminar flow airfoil section. A revised model was built later that year with the wings relocated to a shoulder-mounted position and the tailplane changed to a T-tail configuration.

=== Kurt Tank ===
Like Dewoitine, German designer Kurt Tank, the former technical director of the Focke-Wulf Flugzeugbau AG, had been hired in 1947 to work on a jet fighter project for Argentina. Tank and 62 of his compatriots at Focke-Wulf had emigrated to Latin America to restart his career in aerospace ventures. (Note: In 1947, Tank left West Germany via Denmark. After arriving in Argentina, he sent for his wartime technical staff that he had retained in Bremen as a complete group. By 1952, 62 technicians along with four pilots had joined Tank in Argentina.) Surreptitiously entering the country with a passport identifying him as Pedro Matthies, he found a warm welcome and did not maintain the subterfuge of a secret identity. Along with his former employees, he was instrumental in the evolution of the Instituto Aerotécnico into Argentina's military aircraft factory, the Fábrica Militar de Aviones at Córdoba. Tank was both an engineer as well as a test pilot, who had designed the Fw 190 fighter, but his design team had also been responsible for the Focke-Wulf Ta 183, an unbuilt project that had won the 1945 German Emergency Fighter Competition. The diminutive, swept-wing, jet-powered Ta 183, designed by Focke-Wulf engineer/designer Hans Multhopp, had only reached the stage of wind tunnel studies before the German surrender. (Note: The only prominent engineer missing from the design team Tank amassed in Argentina was Hans Multhopp, the head of the Ta 183 program, who had emigrated to the United Kingdom to work at the Royal Aircraft Establishment (RAE) Farnborough from 1945 to 1949.)

== Design and development ==
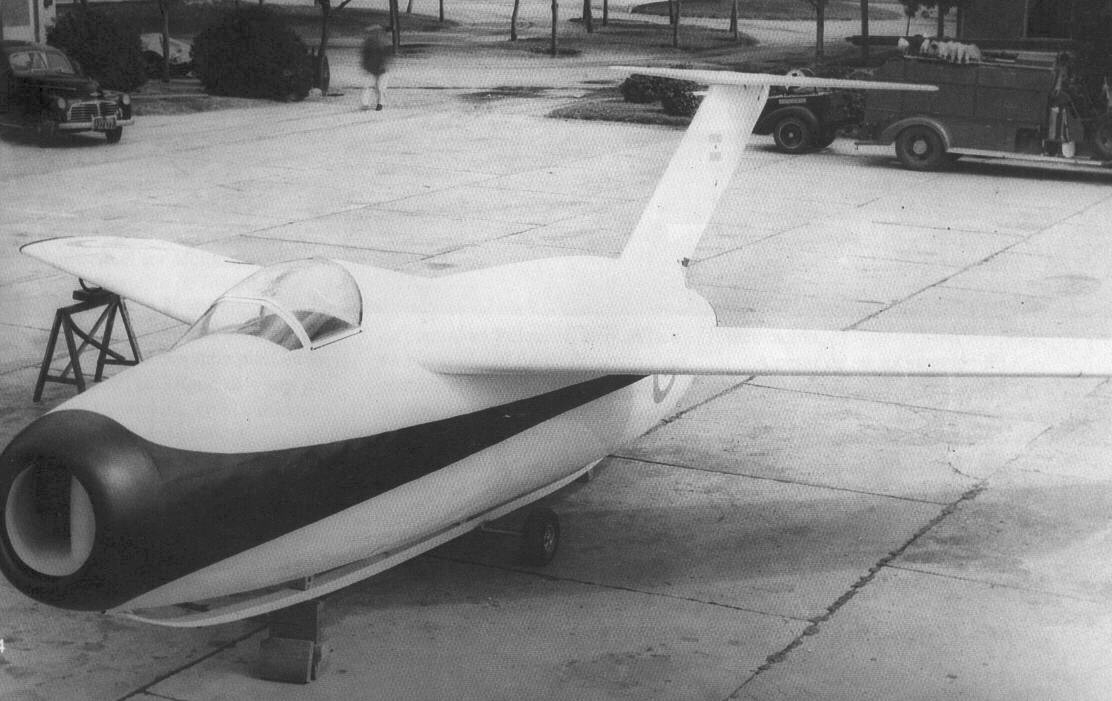
Pulqui II glider

After his appointment as project director for a new indigenous fighter program, Tank adapted the basic Ta 183 airframe for the Nene II engine, resulting in a new design that bore only a passing resemblance to its forebear. The Nene was larger, heavier and more powerful than the Heinkel HeS 011 turbojet that had been planned for use in the Ta 183, (Note: The Jumo 004B turbojet would have been used in prototype Ta 183s, pending availability of the HeS 011.) and therefore required a new, redesigned fuselage with a larger cross-section primarily due to the Nene's centrifugal compressor rather than the HeS 011's axial compressor design.

Due to the similarity of the IAe-27a and Tank's redesign of the Ta 183, Juan Ignacio San Martín, the director of the Institute merged the two parallel projects as the IAe 33 Pulqui II. The fuselage of Tank's design was further adapted to use the IAe-27a's undercarriage. The shoulder-mounted wings were swept back 40°, an even greater sweep angle than that of the Ta 183, and given a small amount of anhedral. Comparable to the Ta 183's engine placement, the Nene engine was situated aft of the cockpit, near the center of gravity with engine maintenance and service facilitated through the removal of the tail section. The airframe featured a graceful, 50° swept-back T-shaped empennage and a pressurized (Note: Although the provision was always specified for the production series, a pressurized cockpit was not introduced until prototype No. 04.) cockpit topped by a clear bubble-type canopy, faired into the dorsal fuselage. Armor was provided around the cockpit and a bulletproof windscreen was incorporated. Fuel capacity was initially 1,250 L (275 Imp. gal.) internally and 800 L (176 Imp. gal.) in the wings. Armament was planned to include four 20 mm cannon, a pair mounted in a staggered, near-ventral position along each side of the fuselage slightly set back from the jet intake.

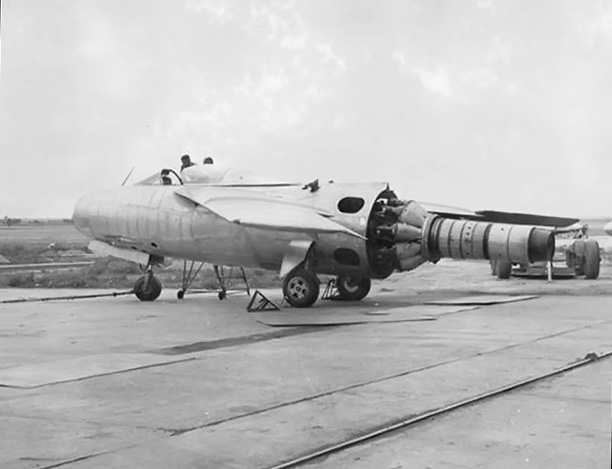
Pulqui II without tail section, revealing its Rolls-Royce Nene II turbojet

=== Testing and evaluation ===
To prove the soundness of the IAe 33 design, two gliders built under contract by another expatriate, Reimar Horten, were constructed and used for aerodynamics testing in 1948–1949, including flights by Tank himself. These tests revealed significant problems with lateral stability, resulting in modifications to the tail to address this problem before construction began on two prototype airframes. Due to the lack of modern machinery, the all-metal fabrication relied heavily on handcrafting, and fabricating the prototypes was a labor-intensive procedure. President Perón envisioned that a benefit of setting up an aviation factory in Argentina would be to introduce production standards comparable to world-class manufacturing facilities. However, Tank realized that production tools and jigs were not feasible at this stage and relied instead on essentially hand-built examples. The first airframe (No. 01) reserved for static testing, was subsequently destroyed during the tests.

The first of the "flying" IAe 33 prototypes, (No. 02) built in 1950, (Note: Due to the recurrent modifications and difficulties encountered in flight testing, Tank reverted to employing the standard prototype testing regime before committing to further prototypes or production aircraft.)completed its maiden flight on 27 June of that year, with Captain Edmundo Weiss at the controls. On the second flight, ex-Focke-Wulf test pilot Otto Behrens encountered severe lateral stability problems at speeds over 700 km/h (435 mph) and returned to the airfield as a precaution. Landing at very high speed, the aircraft bounced with sufficient force to cause the right main undercarriage strut to fail. During repairs to the aircraft, in order to rectify the "tricky" landing characteristics, the front undercarriage strut was increased in length, which served to alter the angle of incidence of the aircraft, while the shock absorbers were adjusted to have a greater "throw". Although insufficient for the aircraft to be considered docile, the modifications improved the takeoff, landing and low-speed characteristics of the IAe 33. More serious aerodynamic problems persisted, stemming from tip stall— in which the wingtip stalled before the wingroot resulting in an unpredictable "rolling moment"— leading to a change in the wing leading edge near the wingroot, while the rudder was modified in an attempt to resolve the interminable lateral instability issues. In addition, the canopy was reinforced with two external frames and a small fairing was installed above the engine exhaust.

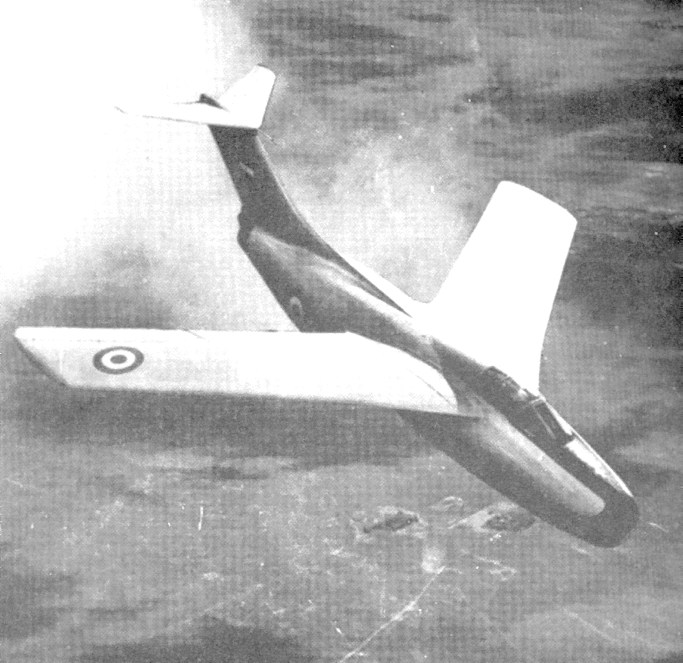
Photograph of Pulqui II that appeared in many publications

Tank, himself a capable development test pilot, took over the test program to investigate the aircraft's stalling characteristics, although the requisite airframe changes took several months to complete, with the Pulqui II N. 02(m) so modified not able to undertake its third proving flight until 23 October. During the ensuing high-altitude test, on two successive occasions, the IAe 33 stalled inadvertently, although Tank had sufficient height at 9,000 m for recovery. Adding ballast to the nose of the aircraft cured the problem. On 8 February 1951, Tank publicly demonstrated the IAe 33 before Perón at the Aeroparque Jorge Newbery in Buenos Aires. The audience included government officials, legislators, the military attaches of foreign embassies, and a large crowd of spectators. Both the IAe 27 Pulqui I and IAe 33 Pulqui II flew during the demonstration.

With the successful completion of the proving test flights, the Argentine Air Force requested a pre-production order of 12 IAe 33 aircraft. In 1951, the air force established a team of service pilots to test fly the new aircraft in a series of acceptance flights. The first flight by Commander Soto on 31 May 1951 revealed severe vibration at about 1,000 kilometres per hour (621 mph). Tank declared the sole prototype unserviceable pending an investigation into the problem, although this stricture appears to have been overlooked and the prototype continued to fly. On the eve of its 28th flight, Captain Vedania Mannuwal, assigned to the test program, was advised not to stress the aircraft, as the source of the vibrations experienced during the previous flight in the morning had not been discovered. Determined to "better" his team leader's recent performance, however, he ignored the precautions and began practising aerobatic maneuvers near Córdoba during his afternoon flight. Consequently, in a high g-force turn, the wing separated from the fuselage due to a structural failure. After struggling with the Martin-Baker Mk I ejection seat, Mannuwal ejected at low altitude while the aircraft was inverted, but his parachute did not fully deploy and he was killed. The defect in the Pulqui II was traced to faulty welding of the joint pin that fastened the wing to the fuselage. Welding had been necessitated by the lack of modern forging and pressing equipment in Argentina.

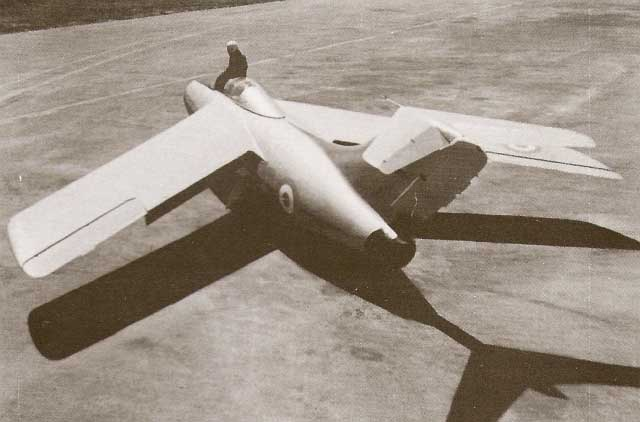
The third prototype (No. 03), c. 1953

Construction of a third prototype (No. 03) began immediately after this loss. The design team initiated a number of changes to rectify design flaws found in the first "flying" prototype, including incorporating a larger rudder to improve lateral stability, increasing the size of the exhaust fairing, and adding a unique air brake that rotated out from the sides of the fuselage near the tail, along with further reinforcement of the canopy. More fuel was also carried internally to extend the range from 2,030 to 3,090 kilometres (1,260 to 1,920 mi). The new IAe 33 prototype completed its first flight on 23 September 1952, piloted by Capt. Jorge Doyle. Flight testing resumed although the aircraft was prepared for a demonstration before President Perón on 11 October 1952. Behrens, who was slated for the flight, had reservations about the flight characteristics of the Pulqui II at the extremes of its flight envelope, characterizing them as "... the worst I've ever experienced as a test pilot". Two days before the exhibition, while practising his display routine, Behrens stalled the Pulqui II at low level and was killed in the resulting crash, which destroyed the prototype.

In 1953, Tank constructed a fourth prototype (No. 04) and, in an attempt to resolve the design's deep stall problems at high angles of attack, added stall fences on each wing and four strakes on the rear fuselage. Other refinements included a pressurized cockpit, additional fuel capacity and it was also the first prototype to be fitted with the definitive four 20 mm Hispano Mark V cannon armament. Lt. Jorge Doyle piloted the fourth IAe 33 on its maiden flight on 20 August 1953 and, along with Lt. Gonzalez and Lt. Balado, began armament testing in 1954.

While an "all-weather" IAe 33 version adding a radar was considered, the Argentine Air Force made tentative plans for the acquisition of 100 Pulqui II aircraft, with the production version to be a dedicated interceptor, featuring an uprated Nene engine fitted with an afterburner and giving it an anticipated maximum speed of Mach 0.98. A number of foreign buyers had expressed interest in the IAe 33, including the Netherlands in 1951 and Egypt in 1953, but the lack of a clear commitment to a production series hampered prospects for export sales, with both nations eventually settling on other readily available fighter aircraft. (Note: The Netherlands acquired the Republic F-84F Thunderstreak and F-84G Thunderjet from the United States under the MDAA, while Egypt chose the Soviet Mikoyan MiG-15.)

=== Political ramifications ===
The IAe 33 Pulqui II project was inexorably linked to the machinations and fortunes of the Peronist regime. Although the Fábrica Militar de Aviones was charged with bringing aviation projects to completion, constant political interference contributed to delays and disarray in aviation programs. Severe economic problems led in 1951 to the Perón government using the Fábrica Militar de Aviones to build cars, trucks, and motorcycles, including the IAME Rastrojero. Moreover, Tank's team was not primarily focused on the IAe 33, completing the design of the FMA IA 35 Huanquero multi-purpose aircraft (transport, trainer and reconnaissance roles), that eventually entered production at the Dirección Nacional de Fabricación e Investigación Aeronáutica (DINFIA) (Spanish: "National Directorate of Aeronautical Manufacturing and Research"). The most devastating political decision was to divert the entire manufacturing program "seemingly overnight" to automotive products and agricultural equipment, essentially closing the aviation divisions. The competing DINFIA projects such as automotive manufacture served to further drain resources in time, money and personnel from the Pulqui II project.

While Argentina's finances were extremely strained at this juncture following the economic crisis in 1953, the most serious setback to the project came in January 1955 when Tank's contract expired. He reputedly requested almost twice as much money to continue but President Perón instead canceled his contract outright. Despite four years of development and trials, the IAe 33 project was still encountering teething problems and its status remained unclear although no final decision had been made to abandon a project that had reached iconic stature in the Perónist era.

== Operational history ==
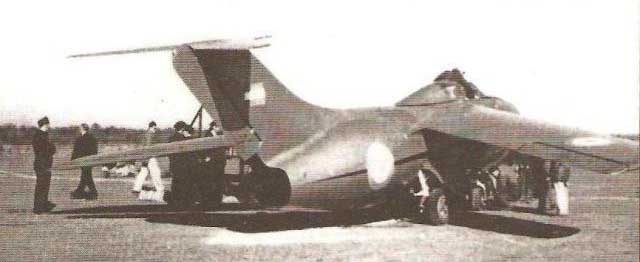
Pulqui II (No. 04) possibly in camouflage, c. 1955

In September 1955, the sole remaining Pulqui II prototype was pressed into action in the Revolución Libertadora, a coup d'état led by General Eduardo Lonardi against Perón. The exact details of its participation are unknown, but when rebel forces commanded by Lonardi captured Córdoba as their first conquest, together with the Meteor F 4s fighter-bombers stationed at the Córdoba Escuela De Aviación - SACE (Military Aviation School), the IAe 33 was enlisted in the struggle. After flying combat missions against Peronist stalwarts, it later appeared in a flyover during the victory parade at Córdoba celebrating the triumph of the coup over loyalist forces.

When the military junta came to power, the IAe 33 project was thrown into disarray. The new government released many of the leading air force staff; similarly, most of Tank's team was forced to leave Argentina with Tank himself going to India, where he worked for Hindustan Aeronautics Limited, and later developed the HF-24 Marut supersonic fighter.

In 1956, the air force, in an effort to gain political support, planned a record flight from Córdoba to Buenos Aires to demonstrate the combat potential of the IAe 33. The Pulqui II would fly 800 km, strafe an air force practice range in the Buenos Aires area, and then return to Córdoba using only internal fuel. The only oxygen equipment available for such a long flight was scrounged from a FMA Meteor under repairs. Lt. Balado successfully completed the flight (including the strafing demonstration) at an average cruise speed of around 900 km/h, but the oxygen system failed on the return leg. The semi-conscious pilot managed to perform an emergency landing at high speed, but the heavy landing and resulting stress broke the landing gear, with the Pulqui II overrunning the end of the runway and being damaged beyond repair.

== Cancellation ==
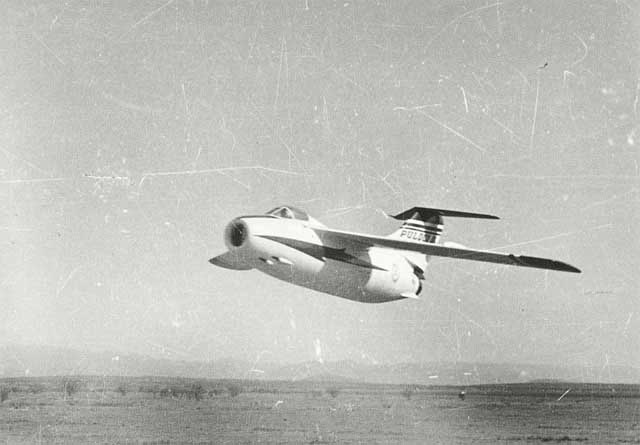
Pulqui IIe (No. 05) on a test flight, c. 1959

Shortly after Balado's record flight, the Argentine Air Force reviewed its decision to acquire 100 Pulqui IIs for its fighter force. Based on the spares and wing and fuselage components at hand, the Fábrica Militar de Aviones asserted that ten aircraft could be constructed relatively quickly, however, the remainder of the order would take five years to complete. Meanwhile, plans for an alternative replacement of the hundred aging Meteor F4s obtained in the late 1940s that constituted the backbone of the Air Force continued, initially centered on the acquisition of 36 Canadair CL-13B Mk 6 Sabres, an idea which was dropped in 1956 because the Central Bank was unable to provide the necessary foreign exchange.

With the Canadair Sabre no longer a viable option, the Fábrica Militar de Aviones seriously considered having the Pulqui II enter series production. A new prototype was ordered in 1957, despite the United States having offered 100 combat-proven F-86 Sabre fighters with Orenda engines that were available immediately. The fifth IAe 33 Pulqui II (No. 05) prototype, designated Pulqui IIe, was constructed in 1959 (visually identical to the fourth prototype although retaining the original frameless, clear canopy) and entered flight testing after its first flight on 18 September of that year, with Lt. Roberto Starc at the controls. The continual evolution of the Pulqui II had resulted in the design team solving its inherent instability at high angles of attack, as well as increasing fuel capacity through the use of a wet wing, to provide sufficient range. However the fighter was now not only considered obsolete, but also politically tainted due to its association with Perón. Consequently, the Argentine government decided to cancel the IAe 33 project at the zenith of its development, instead acquiring second-hand F-86F-40 Sabres from the United States at a "bargain-basement price" under the Mutual Defense Assistance Act. Finally, in September 1960, Argentina received only 28 aircraft, in poor condition and without the promised Orenda engine.

In 1960, after completing only twelve test fights in a new role as a transonic research platform, the last IAe 33 prototype was retired and placed in storage, bringing the Pulqui II project to an end. The remaining factory tooling and incomplete airframes were summarily destroyed soon after.

== Legacy ==
Despite not having achieved production status, the IAe 33 Pulqui II is still considered a significant aviation achievement because it was the first swept-wing jet fighter entirely developed and built in Latin America and, along with the Pulqui I, allowed Argentina to lay claim to becoming only the eighth nation in the world to develop such technology. (Note: After Germany (Heinkel He 178), the United Kingdom (Gloster E.28/39), the United States (Bell P-59 Airacomet), Japan (Nakajima Kikka), the Soviet Union (Mikoyan-Gurevich MiG-9), France (Sud-Ouest Triton) and Sweden (Saab 21R).) One tangible long-term benefit that can be traced to the Pulqui II project was the creation of Argentina's fledgling aviation industry, now restructured as the Fábrica Argentina de Aviones.

== Surviving aircraft ==
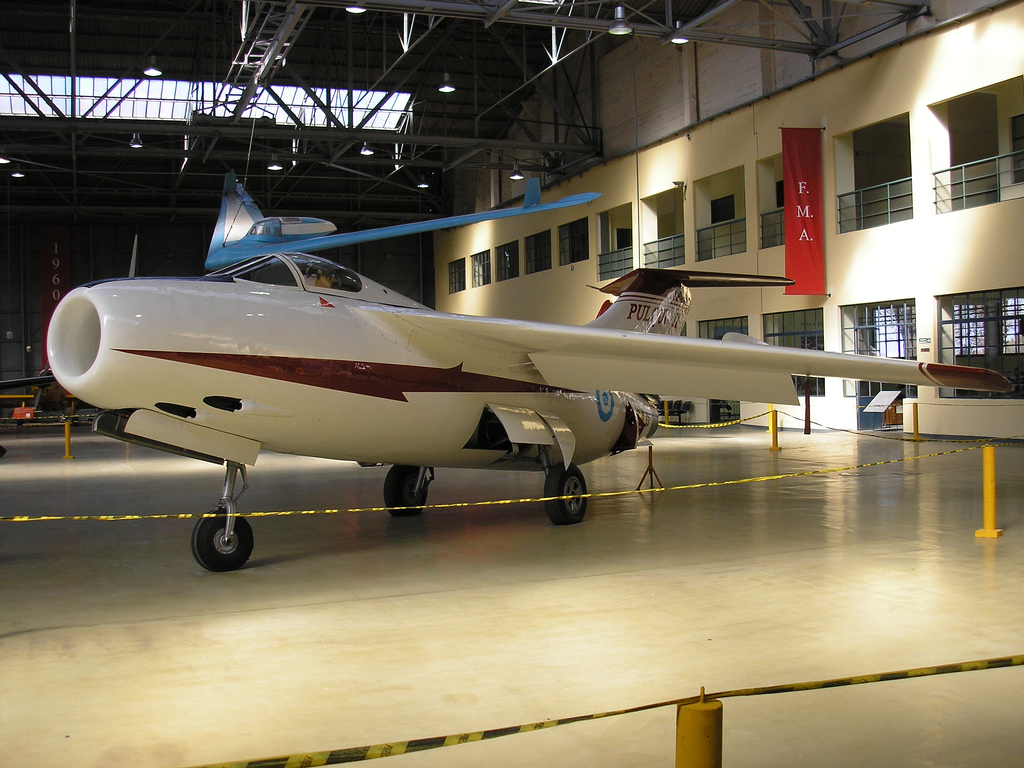
Pulqui IIe (No. 05) in 2007

After decades in an outdoor display at the Aeroparque, Museo Nacional de Aeronautica in Buenos Aires, the sole surviving example of the IAe 33 Pulqui II project is preserved indoors at the Argentine Air Force's Museo Nacional de Aeronáutica de Argentina at Air Base Morón and displayed, still in its original colors and markings, alongside the IAe 27 Pulqui I, both symbols of "lost dreams".

== Specifications (3rd and 4th prototypes) ==
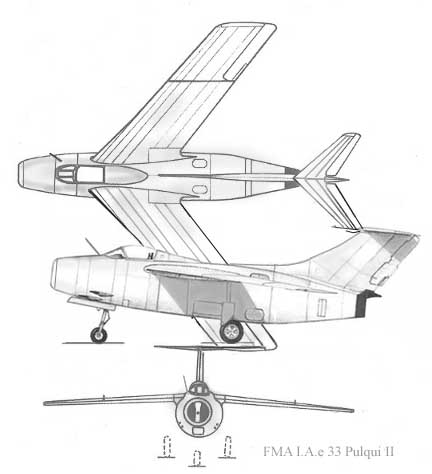
3-view of Pulqui II

Data from "Pioneers & Prototypes: Pulqui, Pulqui II and IA-37/48."

General characteristics

- Crew: one
- Length: 11.68 m (38 ft 4 in)
- Wingspan: 10.6 m (34 ft 9 in)
- Height: 3.5 m (11 ft 6 in)
- Wing area: 25.1 m^{2} (270 sq ft)
- Empty weight: 3,736 kg (8,236 lb)
- Gross weight: 6,793 kg (14,976 lb)
- Fuel capacity: 3125 L (825 US Gal.) internal
- Powerplant: 1 × Rolls-Royce Nene II turbojet, 22.2 kN (5,000 lbf) thrust

Performance

- Maximum speed: 1,080 km/h (670 mph, 580 kn) at 6,000 m (20,000 ft)
- Cruise speed: 954 km/h (593 mph, 515 kn)
- Range: 3,090 km (1,920 mi, 1,670 nmi)
- Endurance: 2 hours, 50 minutes
- Service ceiling: 15,000 m (49,000 ft)
- Rate of climb: 25.5 m/s (5,020 ft/min)
- Thrust/weight: 0.45 with 50% of fuel / 0.33 with max. internal fuel

Armament

- Guns: 4 × 20 mm (0.79 in) Hispano-Suiza HS.404

== See also ==
Related development

- FMA I.Ae. 27 Pulqui I
- Focke-Wulf Ta 183

Aircraft of comparable role, configuration, and era

- Boulton Paul P.111/P.120 – (United Kingdom)
- Dassault Ouragan/Dassault Mystère I – (France)
- Handley Page HP.88 – (United Kingdom)
- Hawker P.1052/1081 – (United Kingdom)
- Lavochkin La-15 – (Soviet Union)
- Mikoyan-Gurevich MiG-15 – (Soviet Union)
- North American F-86 Sabre – (United States)
- Saab 29 Tunnan – (Sweden)
- SNCAC NC 1080 – (France)
- Supermarine 510/528/535 – (United Kingdom)

Related lists

- List of fighter aircraft
