= FMA I.Ae. 27 Pulqui I =

Type of aircraft

IAe 27 Pulqui I
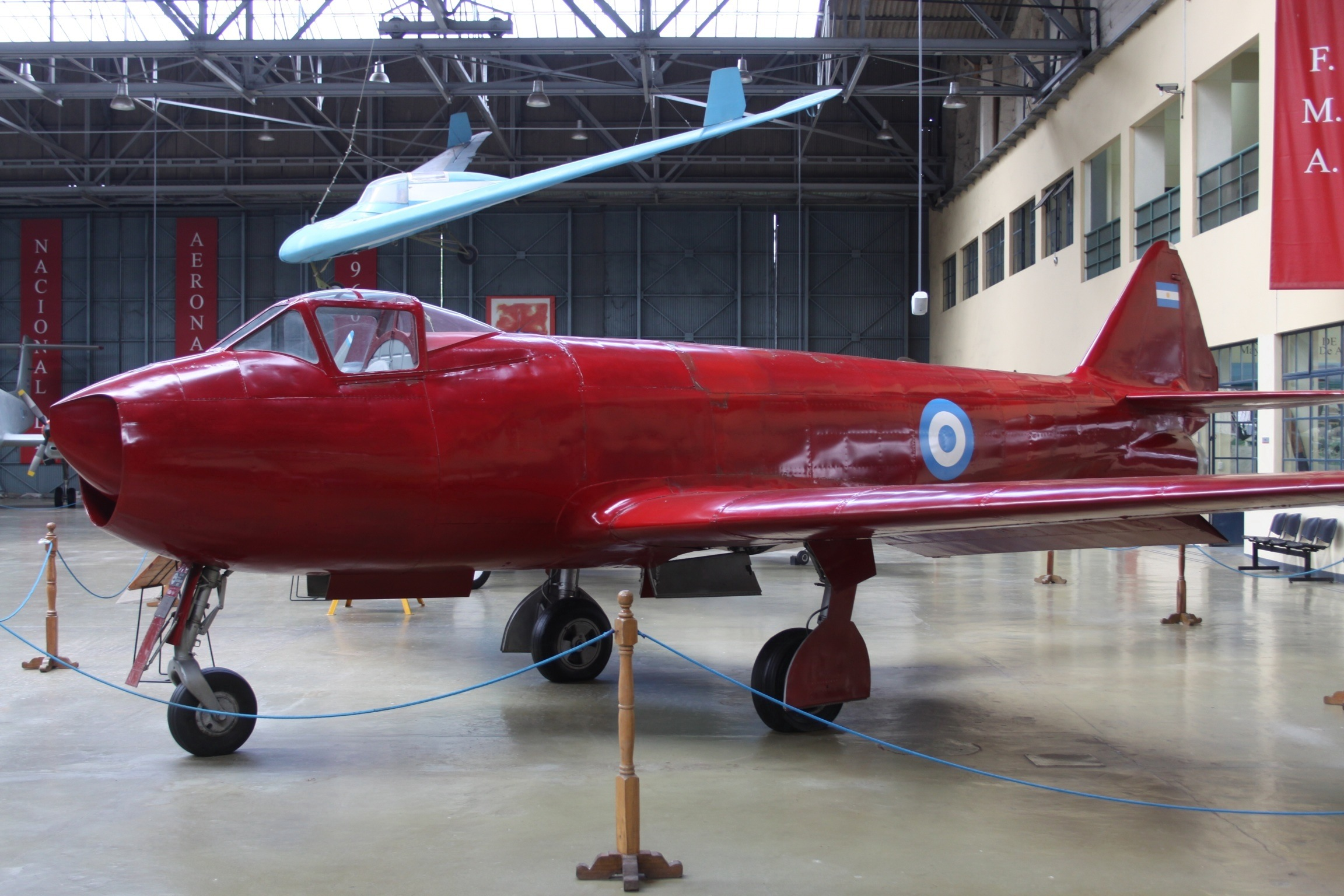
- The I.Ae. 27 Pulqui I prototype at Moron airfield

General information
- Type: Experimental jet
- Manufacturer: Fabrica Militar de Aviones (FMA)
- Designer: Émile Dewoitine
- Primary user: Fuerza Aérea Argentina
- Number built: 1 prototype

History
- First flight: 9 August 1947

The I.Ae. 27 Pulqui I was an Argentine jet designed at the "Instituto Aerotecnico" (AeroTechnical Institute) in 1946. Only one prototype was completed; unsatisfactory performance led to the aircraft being superseded by a later design.

== Design and development ==
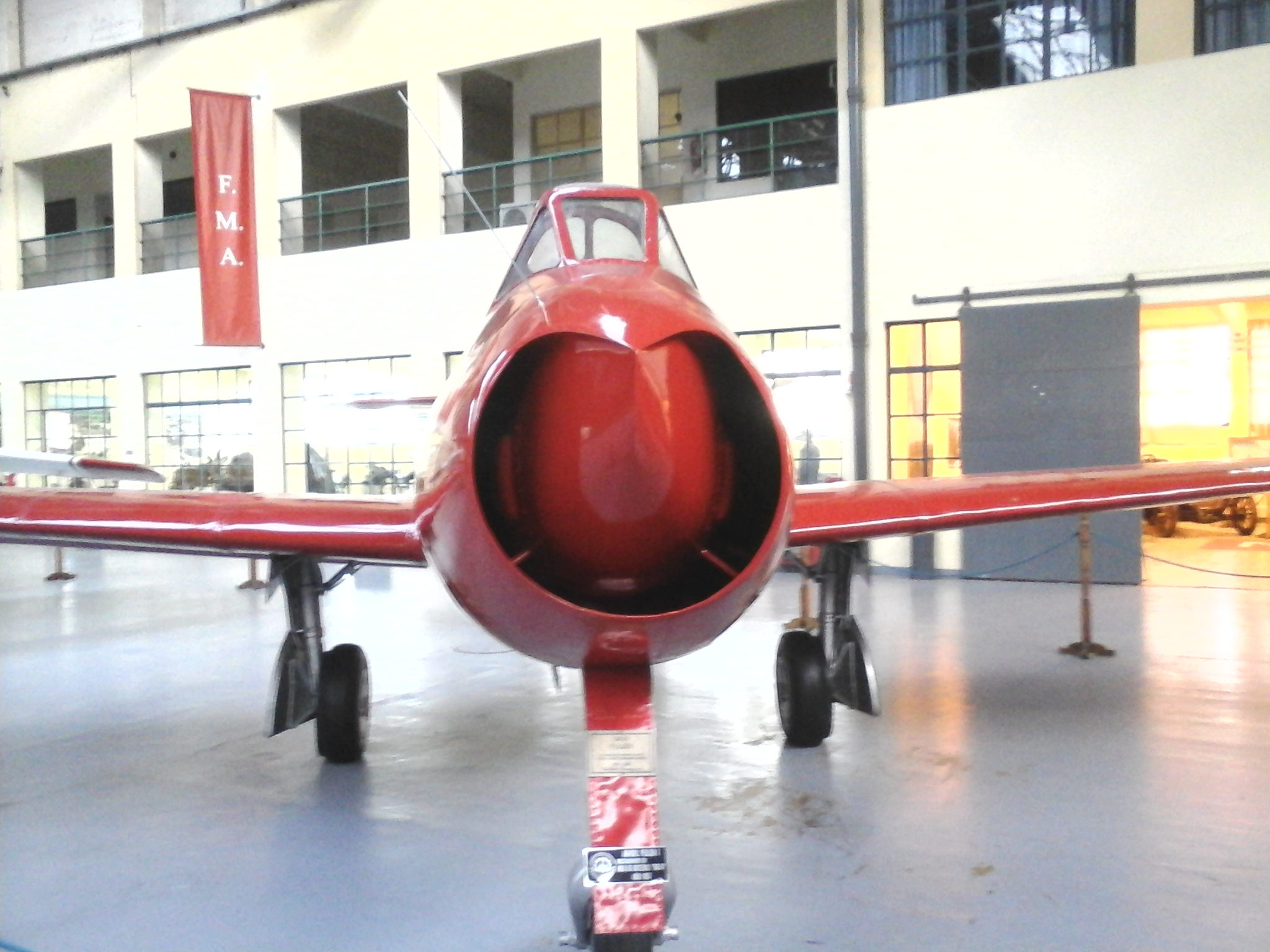
Pulqui I front view, MNA

The design was created by a team led by the French engineer Émile Dewoitine which included engineers Juan Ignacio San Martín (mil.), Enrique Cardeilhac, Cesare Pallavicino and Norberto L. Morchio.

The fuselage was semi-monocoque with an elliptical cross-section housing a single Rolls-Royce Derwent 5 engine with the air intake in the nose and the ducting surrounding the cockpit. The reduced internal fuselage volume forced the fuel tanks to be installed in the wings, which resulted in a significant reduction of its range.

== Operational history ==
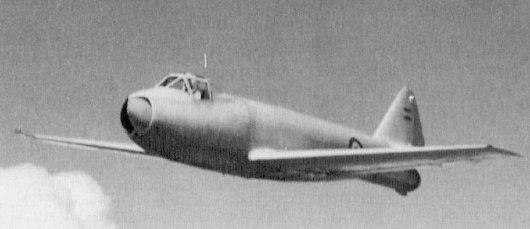
Pulqui I prototype in flight (c.1951)

The prototype flew on 9 August 1947 with test pilot 1st. Lt. Osvaldo Weiss at the controls. The history of this aircraft was brief, limited to testing and evaluation of the only prototype, as its performance was considered unsatisfactory and in the meantime studies for the more developed FMA IAe 33 Pulqui II were quite advanced. Nevertheless, its role in the history of aviation is quite significant as it was the first jet aircraft developed and built in Argentina and Latin America.

== Operators ==
Argentina

- Argentine Air Force

== Aircraft on display ==
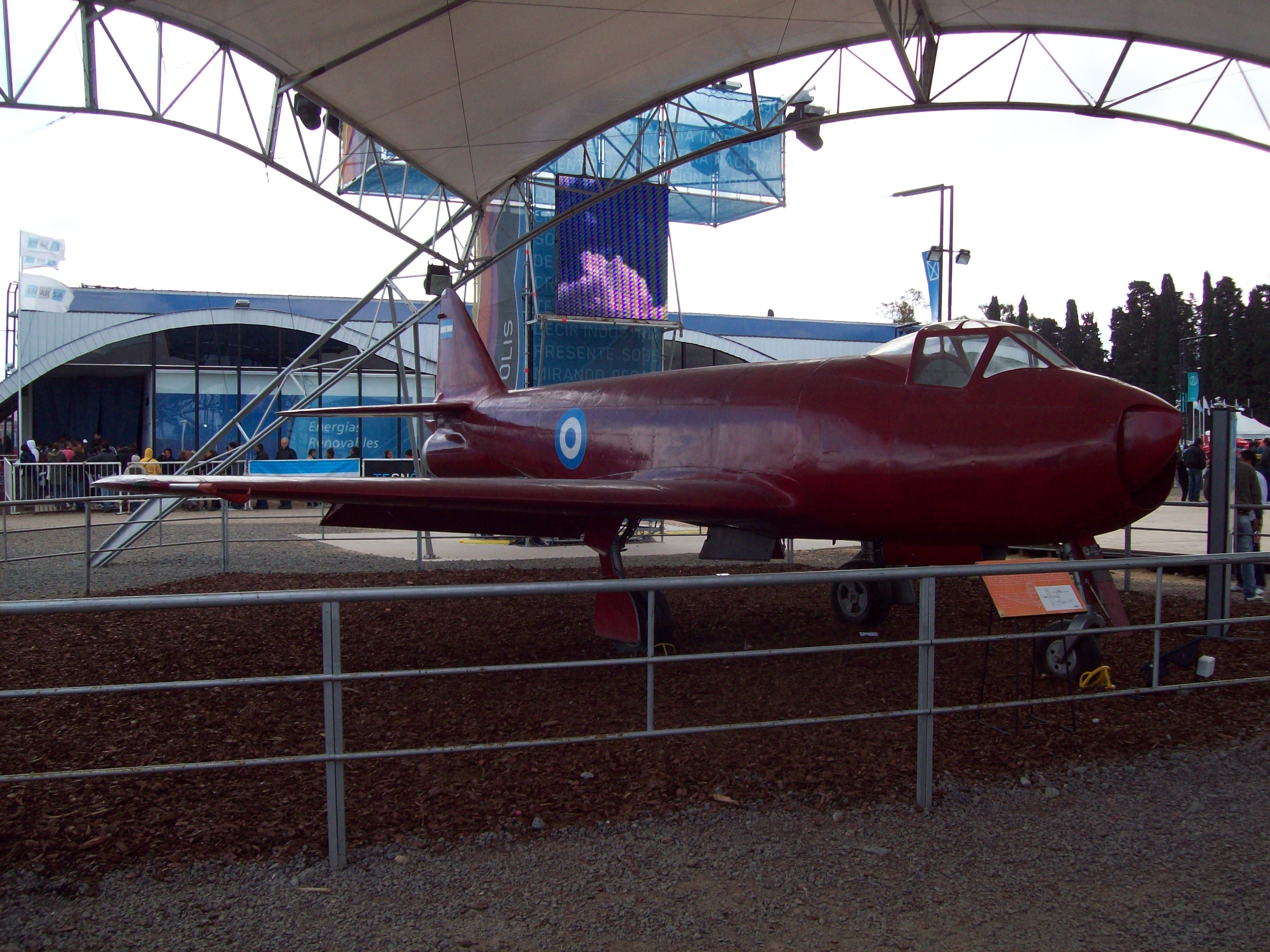
FMA I.Ae. 27 Pulqui I on display at Technopolis

The restored prototype is currently displayed at the Museo Nacional de Aeronáutica de Argentina of the Argentine Air Force at Morón, Buenos Aires, Argentina.

== Specifications ==
General characteristics

- Crew: one
- Length: 9.69 m (31 ft 9 in)
- Wingspan: 11.25 m (36 ft 11 in) (initial version with rounded wingtips) or 10.50 m (34 ft) (final version, squared wingtips)
- Height: 3.39 m (11 ft 1 in)
- Wing area: 19.7 m^{2} (212 sq ft)
- Empty weight: 2,358 kg (5,199 lb)
- Max takeoff weight: 3,600 kg (7,937 lb)
- Powerplant: 1 × Rolls-Royce Derwent 5 centrifugal compressor turbojet, 16 kN (3,600 lbf) thrust

Performance

- Maximum speed: 720 km/h (450 mph, 390 kn)
- Range: 900 km (560 mi, 490 nmi)
- Service ceiling: 15,500 m (50,900 ft)

Armament

- 4 x 20 mm cannon + underwing bombs or rockets (proposed, not fitted to prototype)

== See also ==
Related development

- FMA I.Ae.33 Pulqui II

Aircraft of comparable role, configuration, and era

- Mikoyan-Gurevich MiG-9
- Yakovlev Yak-19
- P-80 Shooting Star

Related lists

- List of fighter aircraft
