= List of aircraft of the Argentine Air Force =

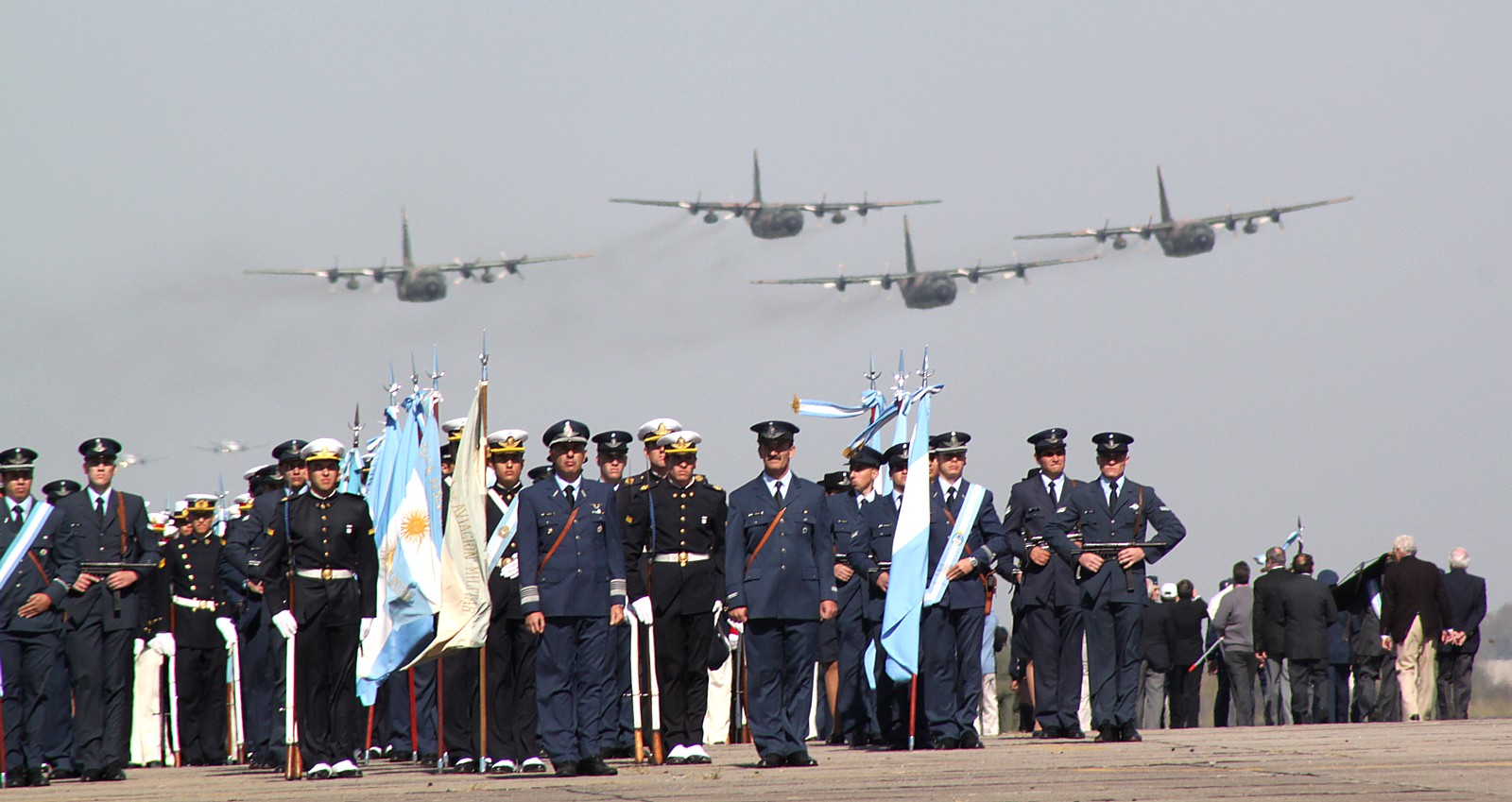
C-130s flypass, Air Fest 2010 show, Moron Air Base, Argentina

This is a list of all fixed-wing and rotary-wing aircraft operated by the Argentine Air Force since its formation in 1945, and by its predecessor (the Army Aviation Service) since 1912 to 1945. Prototypes and aircraft evaluated but not used operationally are excluded. Aircraft are listed under the main role in which they were used for most of their operational life. For the current inventory see the list of active aircraft of the Argentine Air Force.

== Fixed-wing aircraft ==
=== Combat aircraft ===
Aircraft	Origin	Type	Variant	Acquired	Notes
Ansaldo A.1 Balilla	Italy	fighter		2	
Bristol F.2 Fighter	United Kingdom	fighter		42	
Curtiss F11C Goshawk	United States	fighter		10	
Curtiss Hawk 75H	United States	fighter	Hawk 75O	50	one of which was a 75H
Mirage III	France	interceptor	IIIBE/BJ/CJ/EA/DA	41 (Note: Ten new single-seat IIIEAs and two two-seat IIIDAs delivered from 1972, seven IIIEA delivered 1980.)	17 EAs and 2 DAs
Dewoitine D.21	France	fighter		38	
Dassault Mirage 5	France	Fighter-bomber	5P Mara	10	
Dewoitine D.21	France	fighter		38	
Dewoitine D.25	France	fighter		11 (Note: According to Green & Swanborough (1994) The Complete Book of Fighters, five were built.)	
Fiat G.55	Italy	fighter		45	
Fiat G.59-2A	Italy	fighter		1	
Gloster G.41F Meteor	United Kingdom	fighter	F.4	100	
IAI Nesher	Israel	multirole	Dagger A/B Finger IIIb	39 (Note: 35 single-seat Dagger As and four two-seat Dagger Bs, delivered from 1978 to 1982.)	
Nieuport 28	France	fighter		2	
North American F-86 Sabre	United States	fighter	F-86F-30-NA	30	
SPAD S.VII	United States	fighter		1 (Note: According to "World Air Forces - Historical Listings", 2 were in service.)	
SPAD S.XIII	United States	fighter		2 (Note: According to "World Air Forces - Historical Listings", 2 were in service.)	

=== Bombers ===
Aircraft	Origin	Type	Variant	Acquired	Notes
Airco DH.9	United Kingdom	bomber		1	
Avro Lancaster	United Kingdom	bomber		15	
Avro Lincoln	United Kingdom	bomber		30	
Breguet 19	France	bomber		38	
Caproni Ca.33	Italy	heavy bomber		4	
English Electric Canberra	United Kingdom	bomber	B.62	10 (Note: Additional 1981 order of 1 each B.62 and T.64 not delivered.)	
Fiat B.R.2	Italy	bomber		2	
FMA AeMB.2	Argentina	heavy bomber		14	
I.Ae. 24 Calquin	Argentina	tactical bomber		108	It was also used as a fighter aircraft.
Martin Model 139WAA	United States	tactical bomber		22	

=== Attack aircraft ===
Aircraft	Origin	Type	Variant	Acquired	Notes
Douglas 8A-2	United States	Attack aircraft		30	
Douglas A-4 Skyhawk	United States	Attack aircraft	B/C/P/Q	75	
Lockheed Martin A-4AR Fightinghawk	United States	Attack Aircraft		36	
IA 58 Pucará	Argentina	attack / COIN		108	

=== Reconnaissance aircraft ===
Aircraft	Origin	Type	Variant	Acquired	Notes
Ansaldo SVA	Italy	reconnaissance	5/10	20 (Note: According to "Rumbos Aeronáuticos, Issue 28", 16 were in service.)	of which 3 were SVA 10s (Note: "Rumbos Aeronáuticos, Issue 28" mentions only 1 in service.)
Caudron G.3	France	reconnaissance		6	
Farman F.40	France	reconnaissance		2	
FMA AeMO.1	Argentina	reconnaissance		12	
FMA AeC.2	Argentina	reconnaissance	MO.1/.2	12 / 20	
Piper PA-18	United States	reconnaissance		7	
SPAD S.XVI	United States	reconnaissance		1	

=== Transport and utility aircraft ===
Aircraft	Origin	Type	Variant	Acquired	Notes
Aero Boero AB-115	Argentina	utility		3	
Aero Boero AB-150	Argentina	utility		1	
Aero Boero AB-180	Argentina	utility		2	
Airspeed Consul	United Kingdom	transport		6	
Aero Commander 500	United States	transport	B/U/680	1 / 24 / 1	
Avro Lancastrian	United Kingdom	transport		2	
Avro Lincoln	United Kingdom	transport		1 (Note: Lincoln bomber B-003/B-022 was converted to transport.)	
Beech C-45 Expeditor	United States	transport		4	
Beechcraft King Air	United States	transport		15	
Boeing 707	United States	VIP		7	
Bristol Freighter	United Kingdom	transport		15	
Bombardier Learjet LJ35A	Canada	VIP		6 (Note: two reconnaissance aircraft delivered each 1978 and 1980. Calibration aircraft delivered in 1981-2.)	
Cessna	United States	utility	150/170/180	1 / 1 / 10	
Cessna 182 Skylane	United States	utility		91	
Cessna 320 Skyknight	United States	utility		2	
Curtiss C-46 Commando	United States	transport		2	
de Havilland Dove	United Kingdom	transport		44	
de Havilland Canada DHC-2	Canada	transport		6	
De Havilland Canada DHC-3	Canada	transport		2	
De Havilland Canada DHC-6	Canada	transport		10	STOL capable aircraft
Dewoitine D.332	France	transport	D.332/D.338	2 / 2	
DINFIA IA 35	Argentina	transport		67	
DINFIA IA 46	Argentina	utility		7	
Douglas C-47	United States	transport		50	
Douglas C-54	United States	transport		9	
Douglas DC-6	United States	transport		5	
FMA AeC.1	Argentina	utility		13	
FMA IA 50 Guaraní II	Argentina	transport		29	
Fokker F27	Netherlands	transport		15	
Fokker F28	Netherlands	transport		7	
Grumman Albatross	United States	SAR / utility	6		amphibious aircraft
Hawker Siddeley HS 748	United Kingdom	transport		1	
Junkers W 34	Germany	transport		6	
Junkers F.13ge	Germany	transport		2	
Junkers Ju 52/3m	Germany	transport		15	
Junkers W 34	Germany	transport		1	
Lockheed Electra	United States	transport	10/12B	3	2 of which are 12B Electra Juniors
C-130 Hercules	United States	tactical airlifter	C-130H/L-100	3 / 1	
KC-130 Hercules	United States	aerial refueling / transport		2	
Max Holste Broussard	France	utility		12	
Mitsubishi MU-2	Japan	utility		3	
North American Sabreliner	United States	transport	75A	1	
Piper PA-23	United States	utility	Aztec C		6
Piper PA-25	United States	utility	235	2	
Piper PA-28	United States	utility	236/180	13	10 of which are Dakotas
Piper PA-31	United States	utility		3	
Piper PA-34	United States	utility		3	
Saab 340	Sweden	VIP	B	4	
Sud Aviation Caravelle	France	VIP		3	
Swearingen Merlin	United States	VIP		2	
Vickers Viking	United Kingdom	utility		30	amphibious aircraft

=== Trainer aircraft ===
Aircraft	Origin	Type	Variant	Acquired	Notes
Avro 504	United Kingdom	trainer	K/N/504R	113	of which 66 were 504R Gosports
Avro 626	United Kingdom	trainer		15	
English Electric Canberra	United Kingdom	conversion trainer	T.64	2	
Beechcraft 18	United States	trainer	AT-11	30	
Beechcraft T-34	United States	trainer	AT-11	90	60 were licensed built by FMA
T-6 Texan II	United States	trainer		12<	
Blériot XI	France	trainer		11	
Boeing-Stearman 75	United States	trainer		3	
Curtiss JN-4	United States	trainer		14	
Curtiss Fledgling	United States	trainer		2	
Deperdussin Monocoque	France	trainer		1	
EMB-312 Tucano	Brazil	trainer		35	turboprop trainer
Fairchild PT-19	United States	trainer		1	
Fiat G.46	Italy	trainer		48	
FMA AeC.2	Argentina	trainer		7	
FMA IA 63 Pampa	Argentina	trainer		32	of which 24 are AT-63s
Focke-Wulf Fw 44J	Germany	trainer		197	
Focke-Wulf Fw 58	Germany	trainer		41	also task as a transport
I.Ae. 22 DL	Argentina	trainer		200	
Miles Magister	United Kingdom	trainer		108	
Morane-Saulnier G	France	trainer		2	
Morane-Saulnier L	France	trainer		1	
MS.760 Paris	France	jet trainer		48	
Nieuport II	France	trainer	II.G/IV.G	2 / 2	
North American NA-16	United States	trainer		30	
North American T-28	United States	trainer		58	
Percival Prentice	United Kingdom	trainer		100	
Etrich Taube	Germany	trainer		1	
Sukhoi Su-29	Russia	aerobatics		8	used by the Cruz del Sur demo team
Voisin V	France	trainer		1	

=== Gliders ===
Aircraft	Origin	Type	Variant	Acquired	Notes
Bölkow Phoebus	Germany	trainer		1	
Schleicher ASW 20	Germany	trainer		1	
Eiri-Avion PIK-20	Finland	trainer		1	
Grob Twin Astir	Germany	trainer		3	
LET L-13 Blaník	Czech Republic	trainer		3	
Schleicher Ka-7 Rhönadler	Germany	trainer		1	
SZD-30 Pirat	Poland	trainer		4	

=== Gallery ===
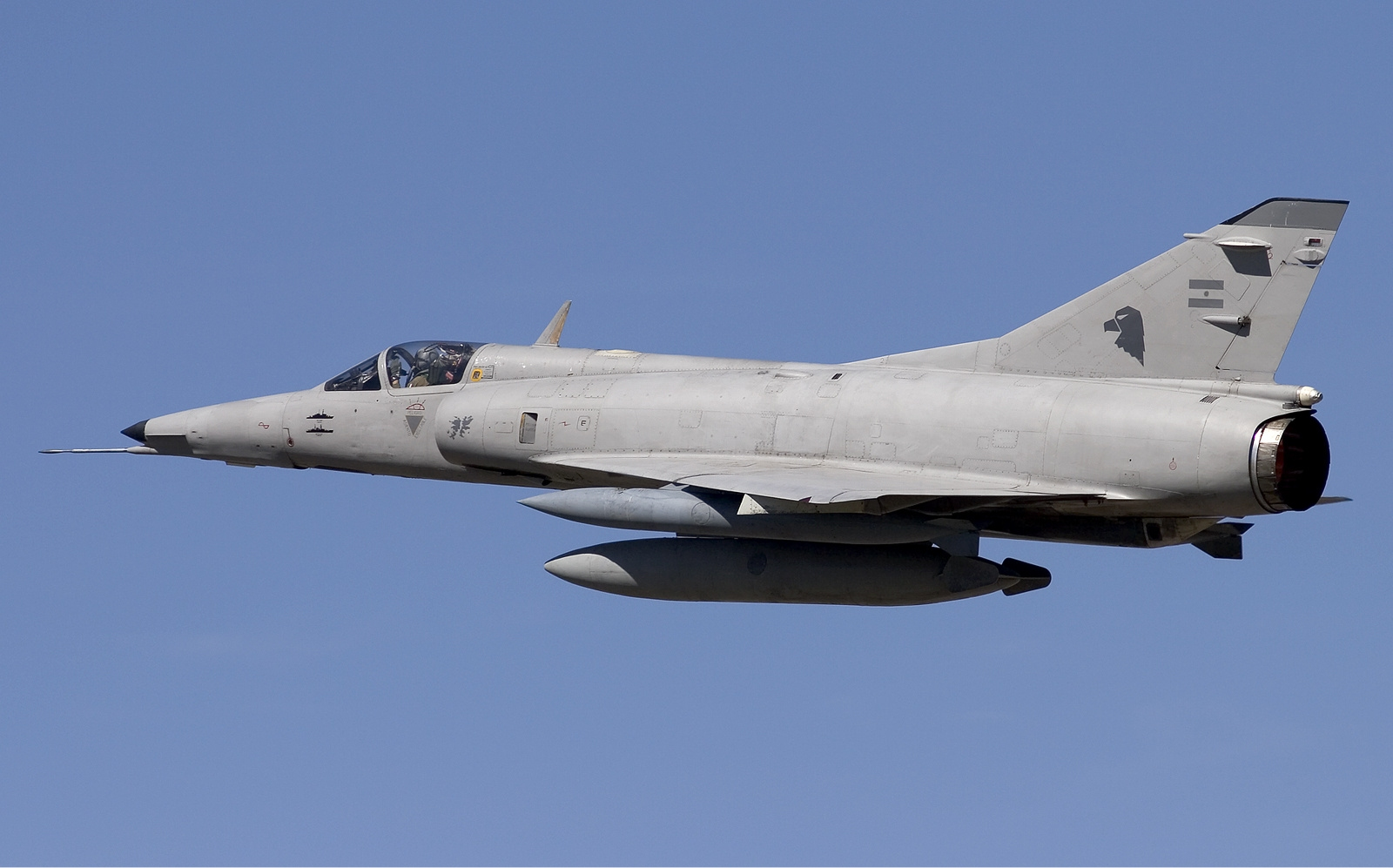
IAI Finger A

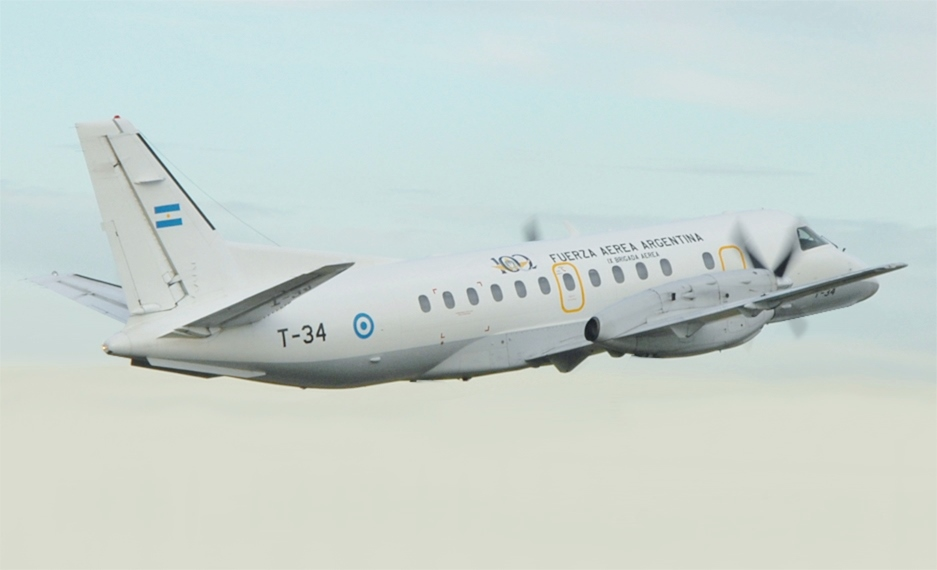
Saab 340

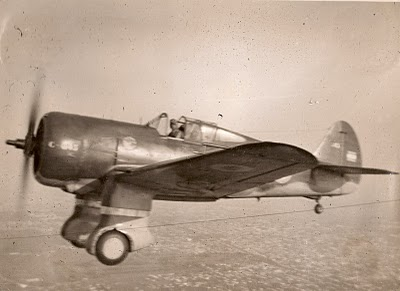
Curtiss Hawk 75O

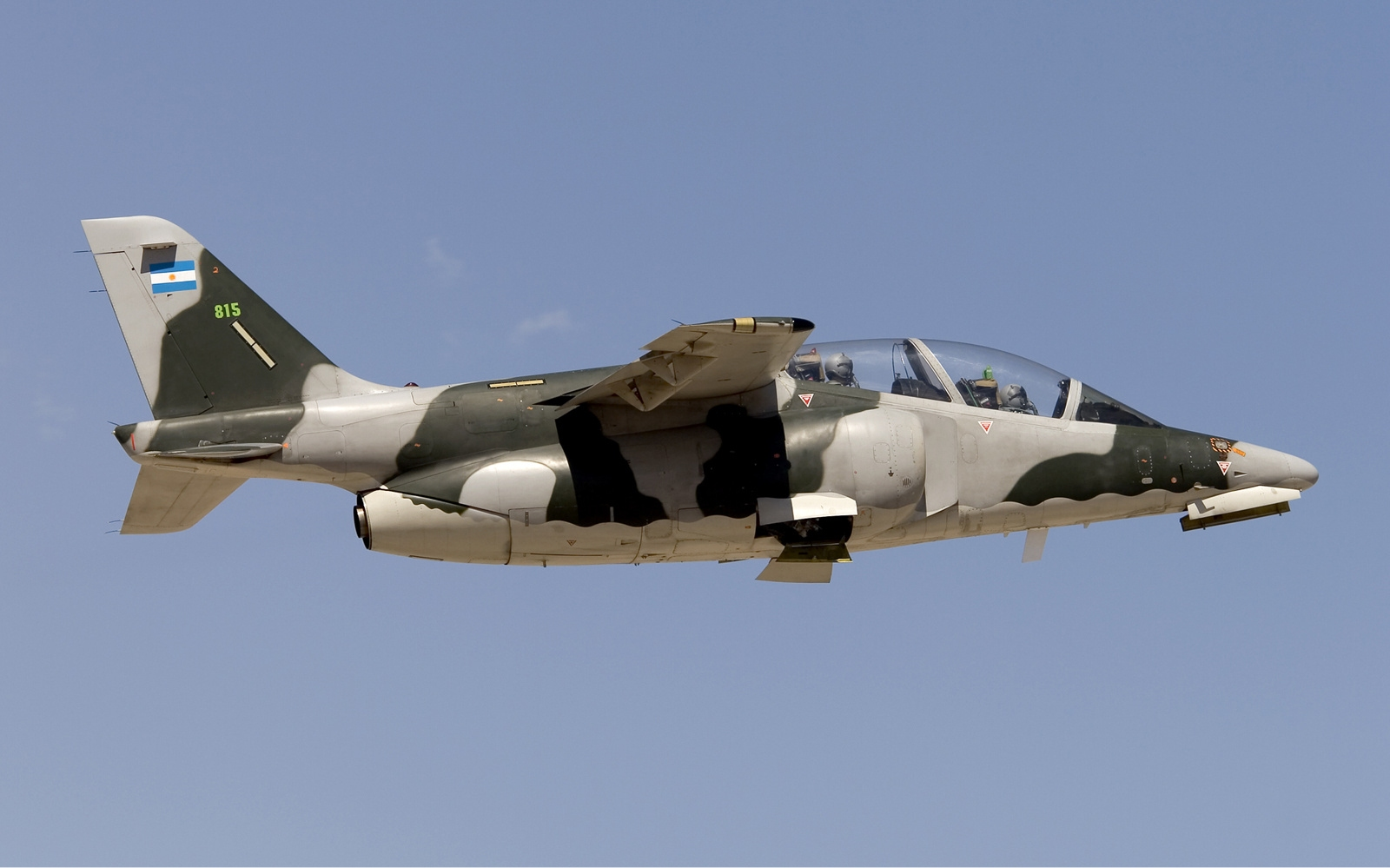
FMA IA-63 Pampa

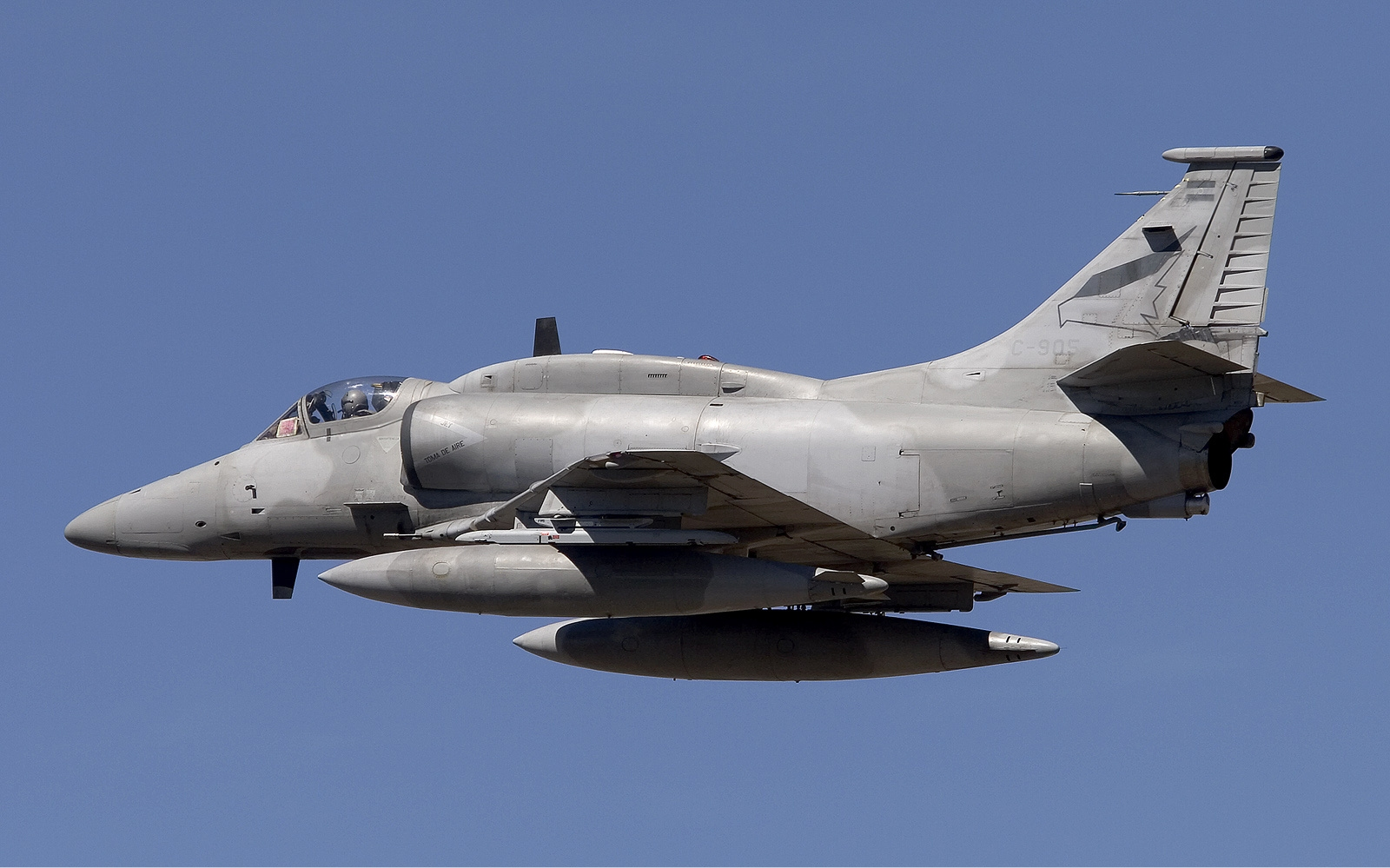
McDonnell Douglas A-4AR

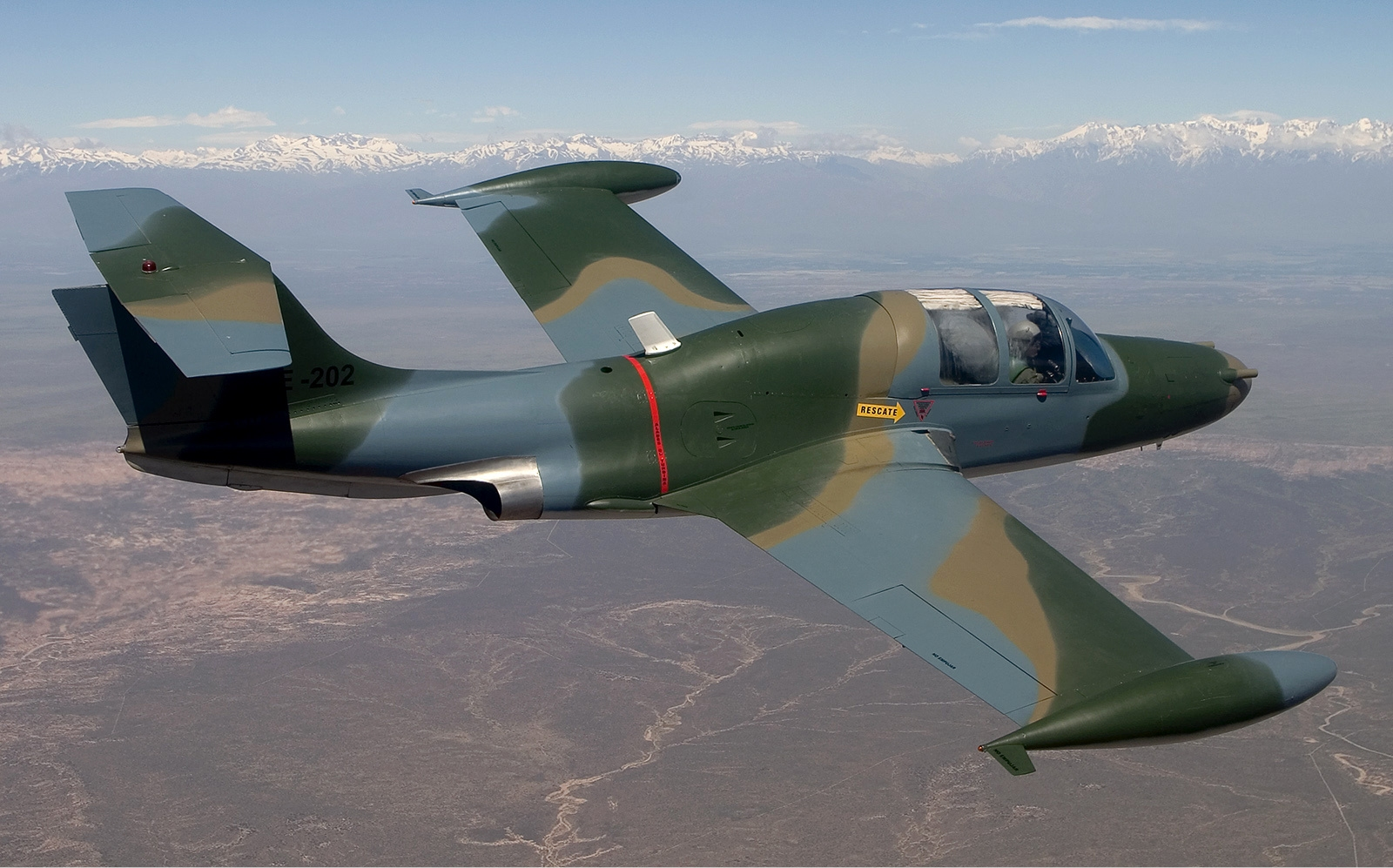
Morane-Saulnier 760

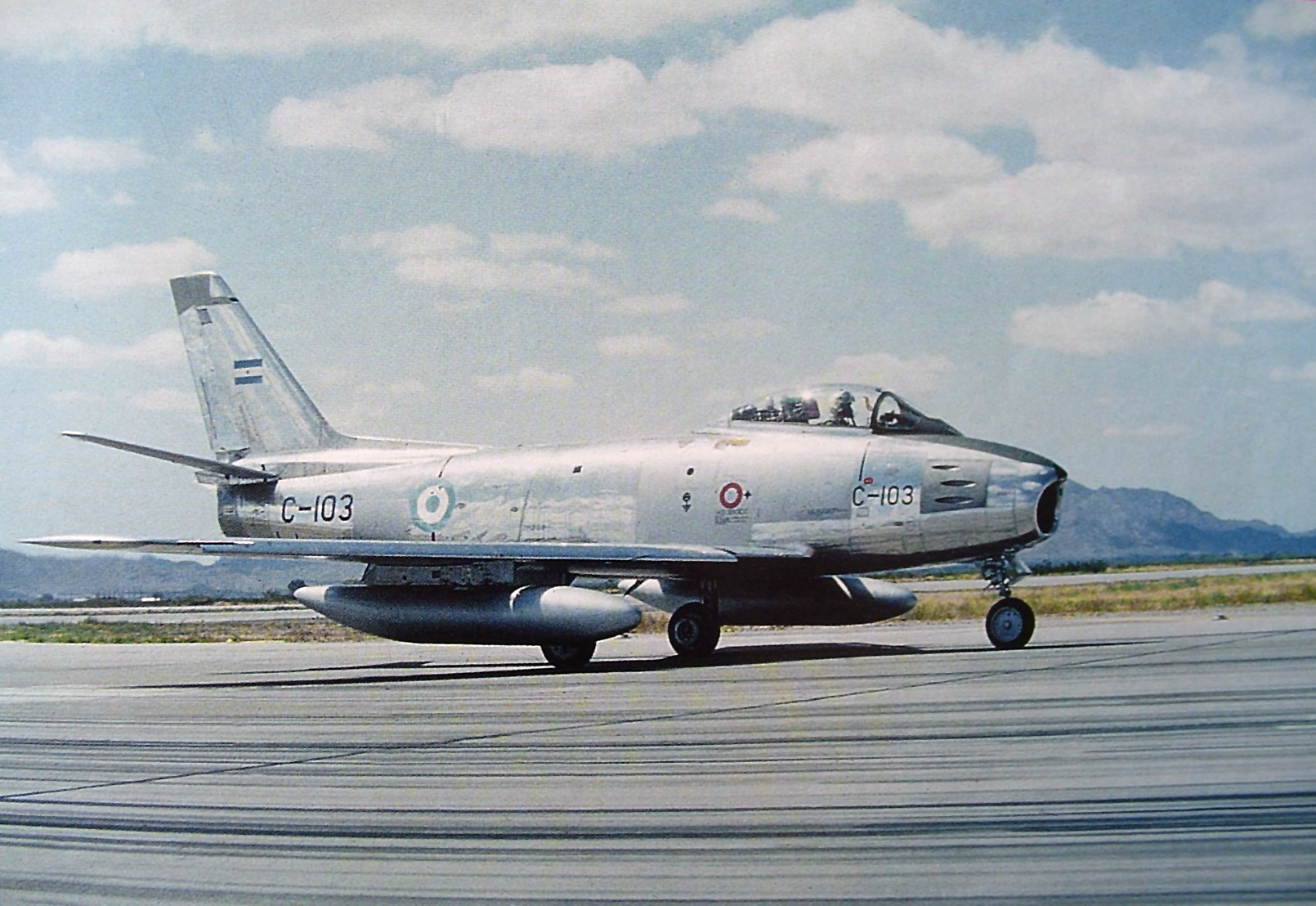
North American F-86F-30

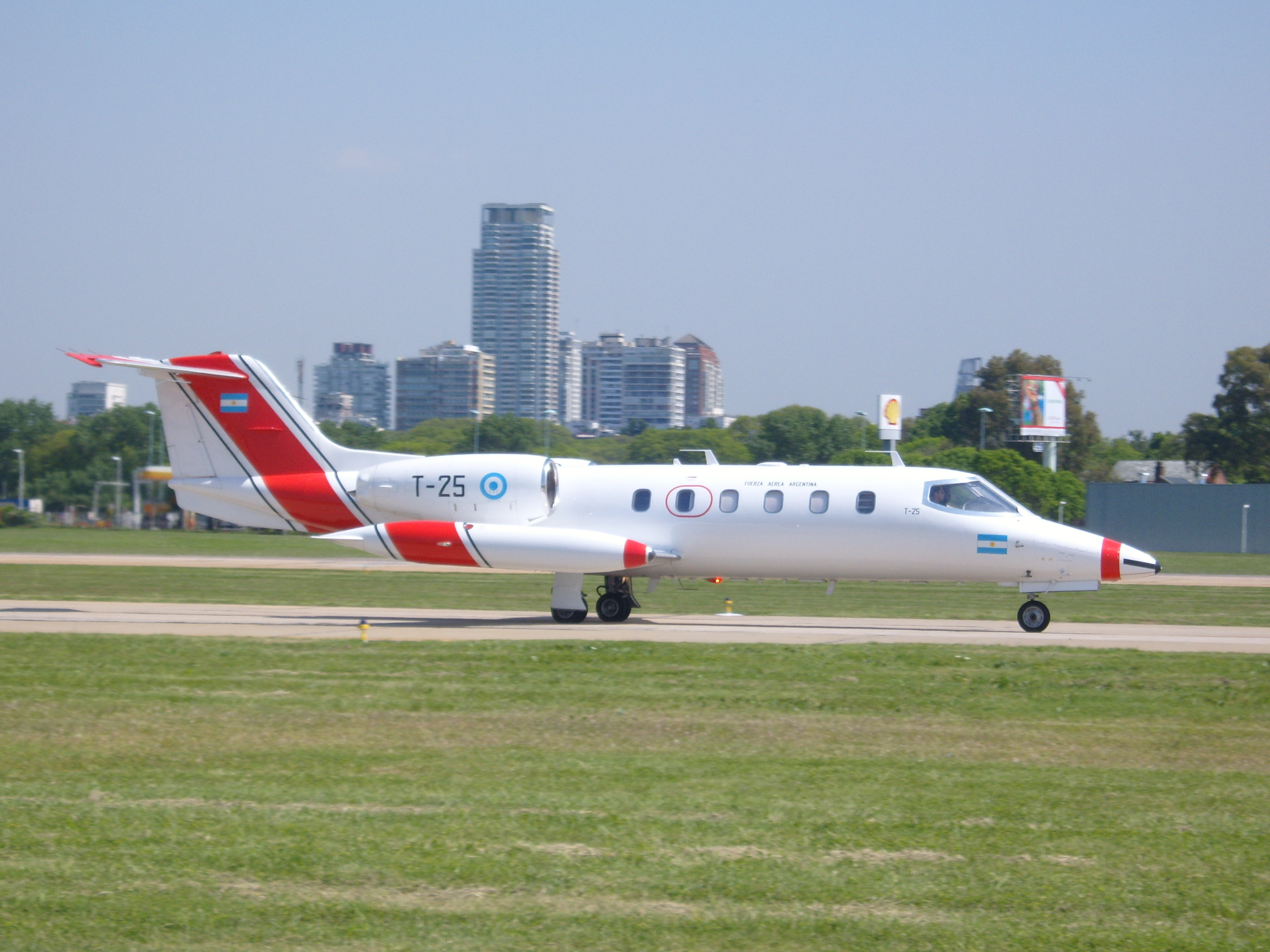
Learjet 35

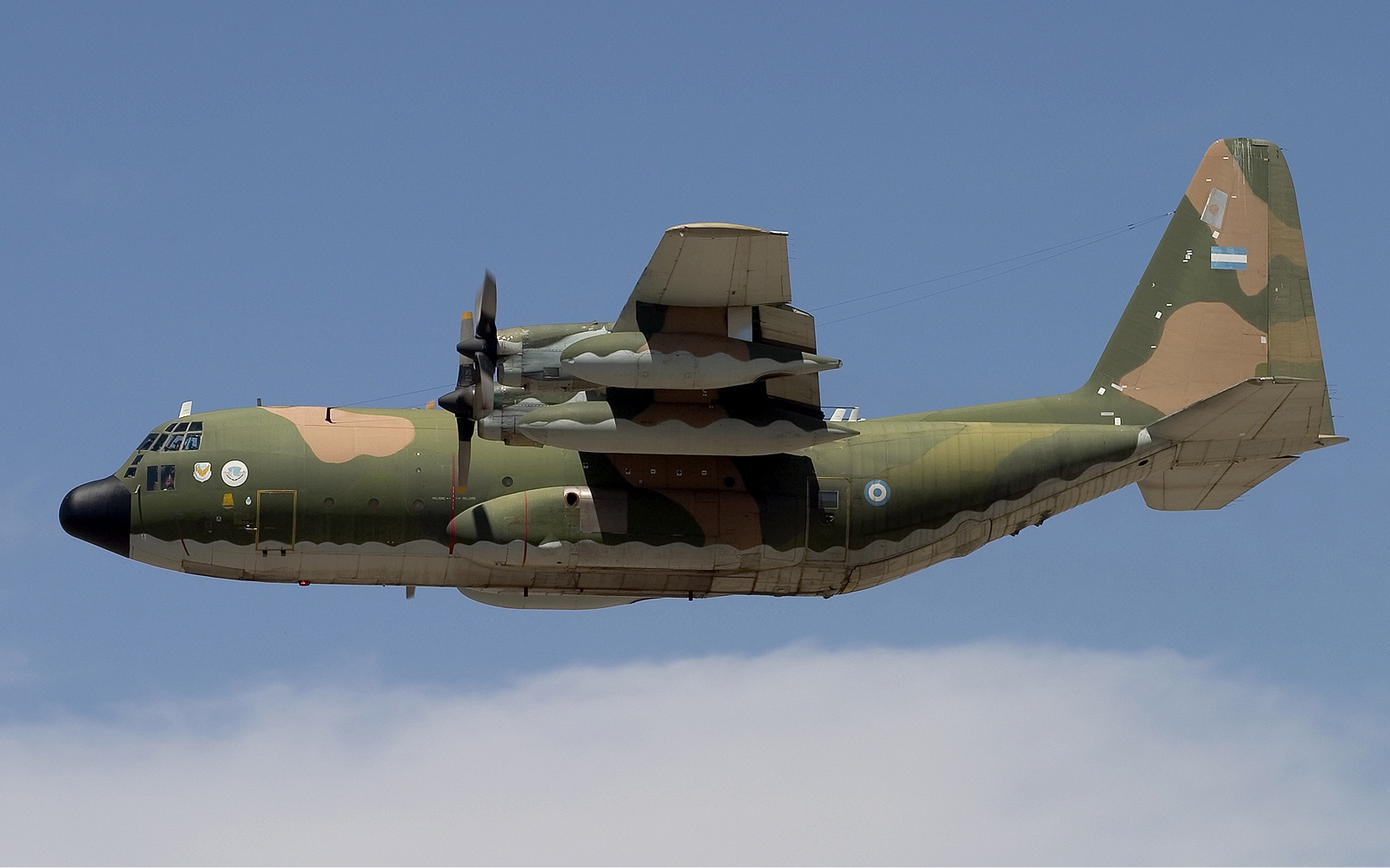
Lockheed KC-130H Hercules

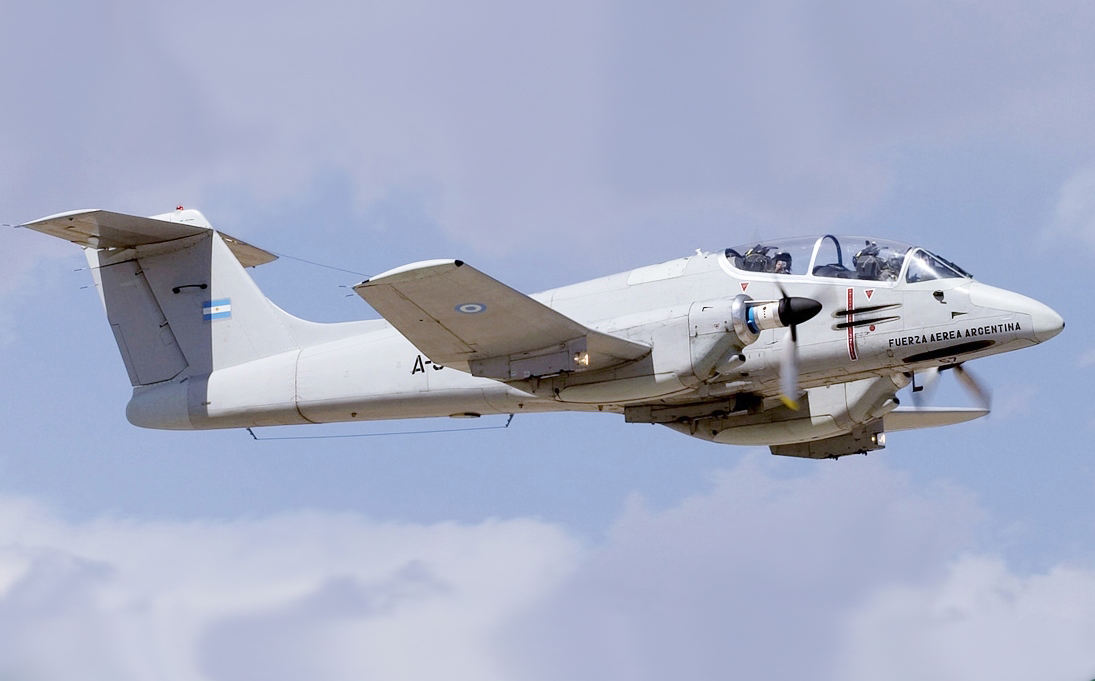
FMA IA-58A Pucara

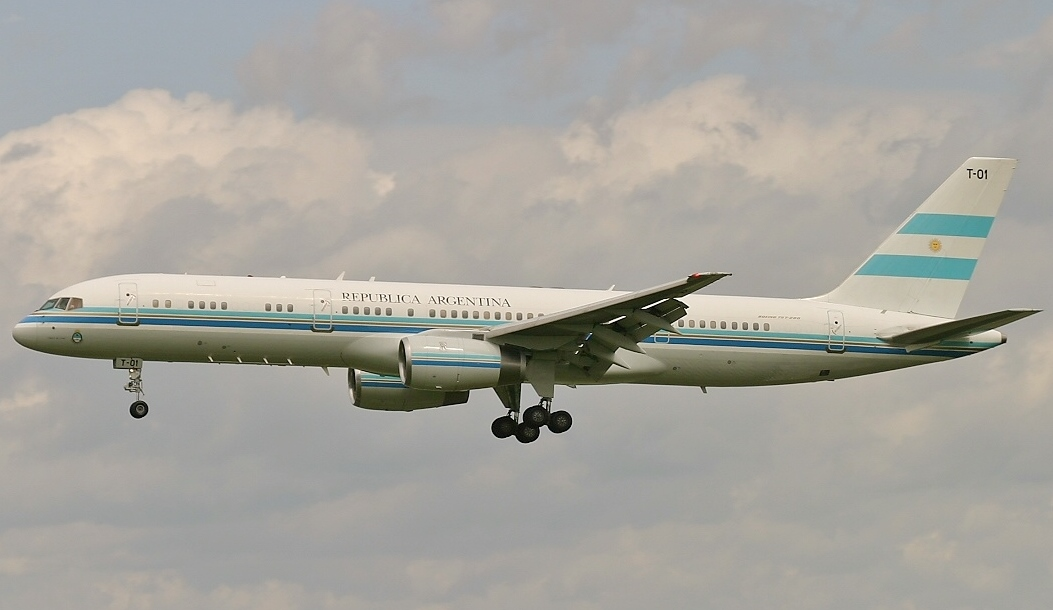
Tango 1 on approach to Václav Havel Airport, Prague

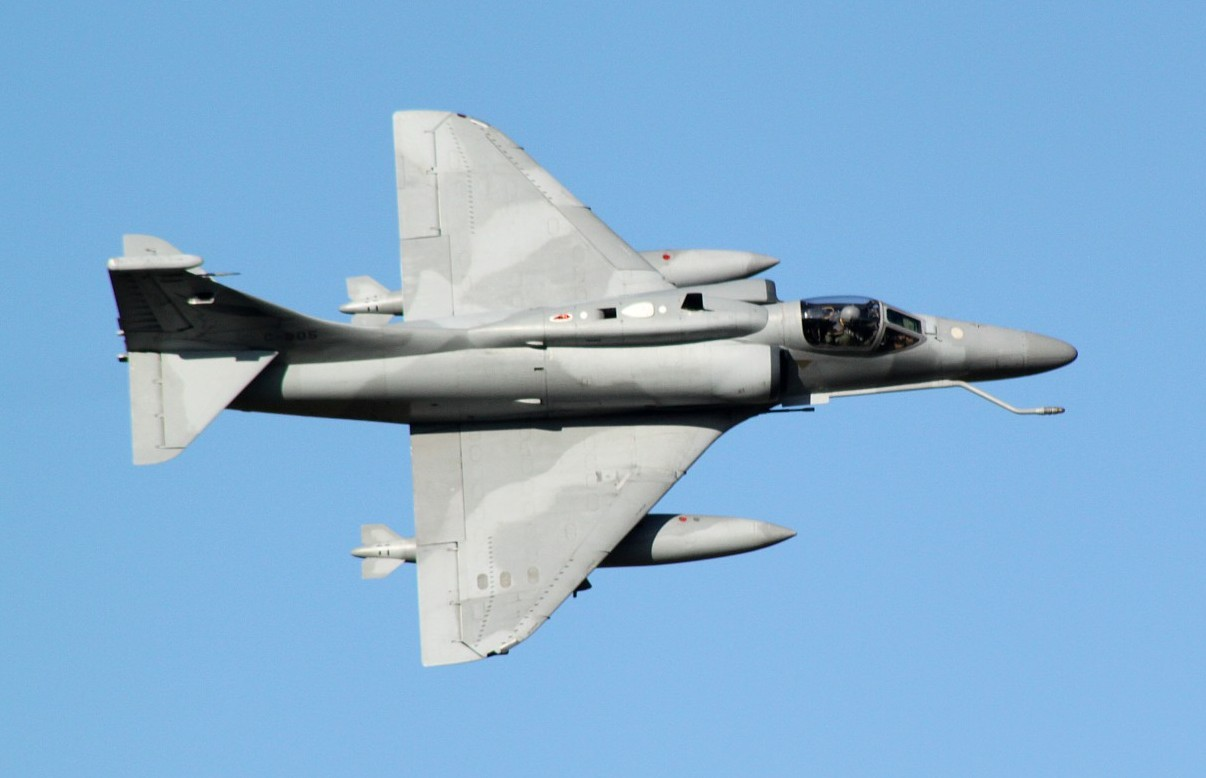
A-4AR (Fightinghawk) ground-attack aircraft

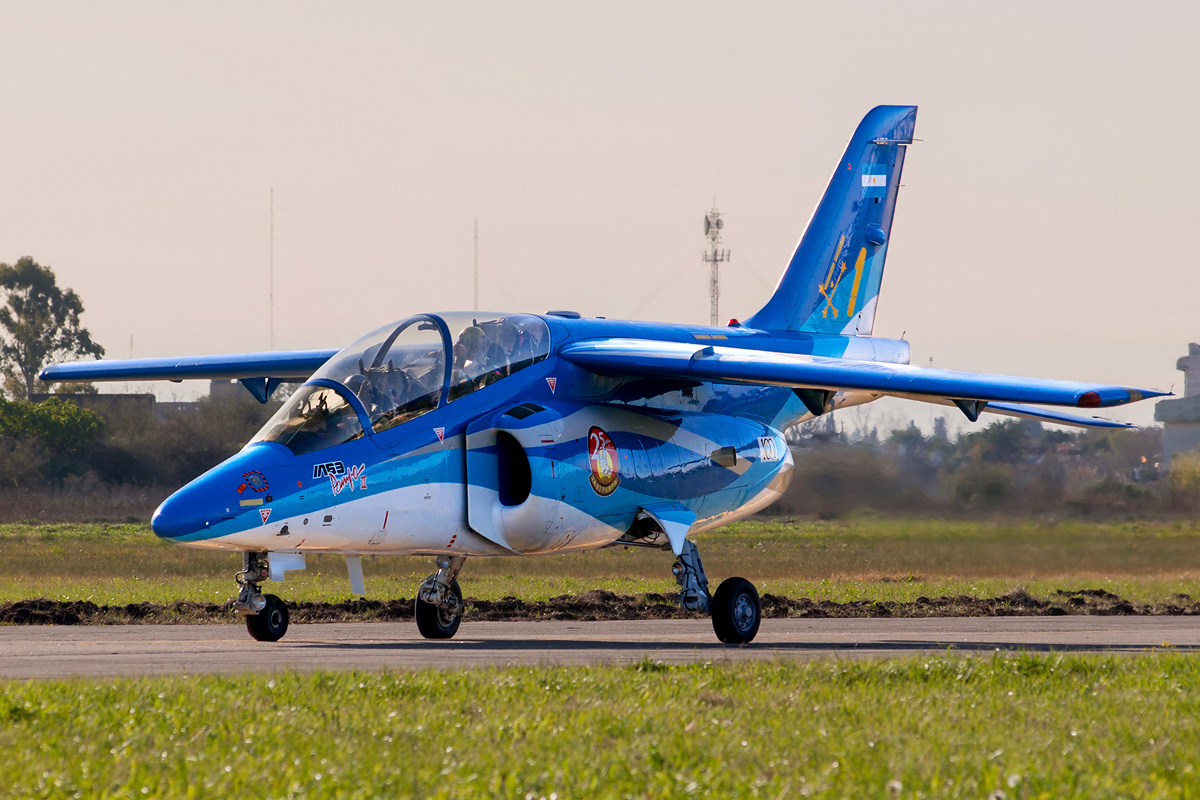
Pampa II from the Argentine’s aerobatic display team Cruz del Sur

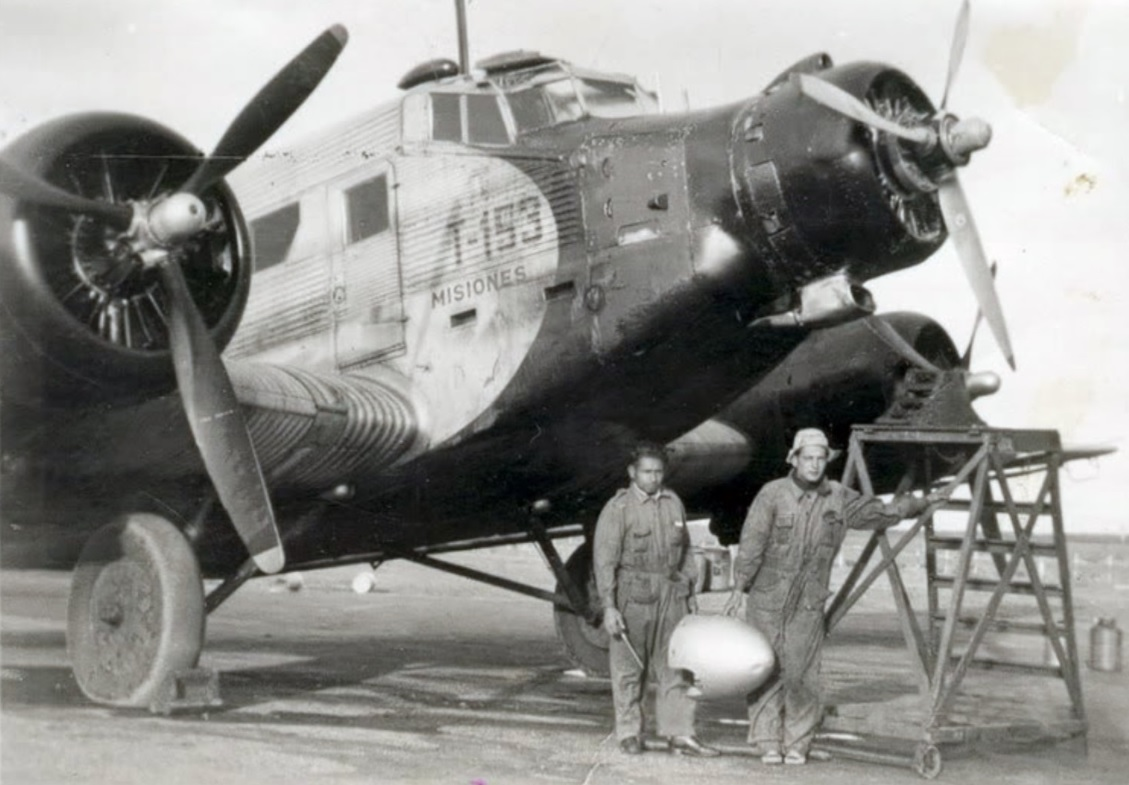
Ju 52 T-153, 1946

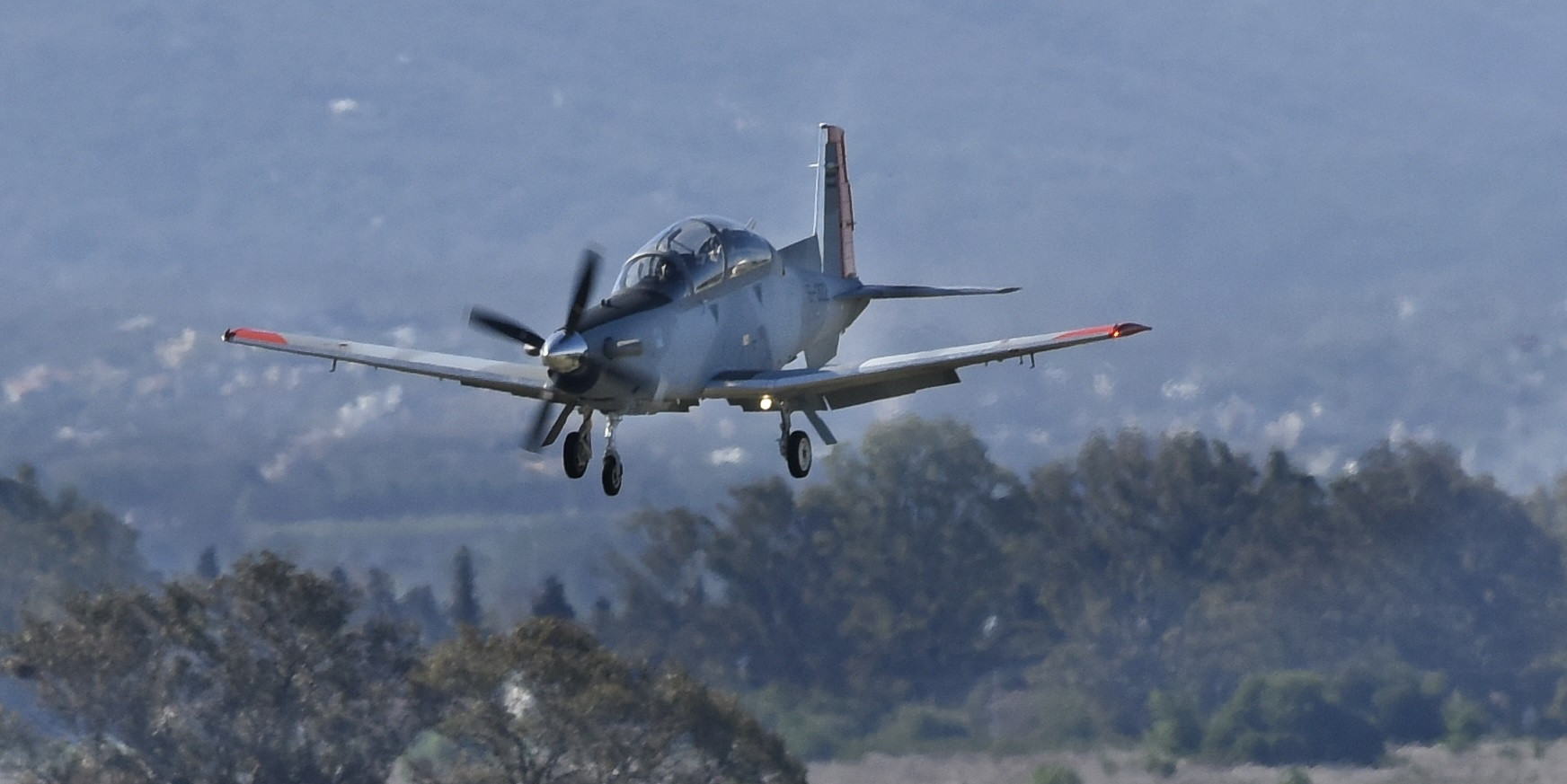
Texan II

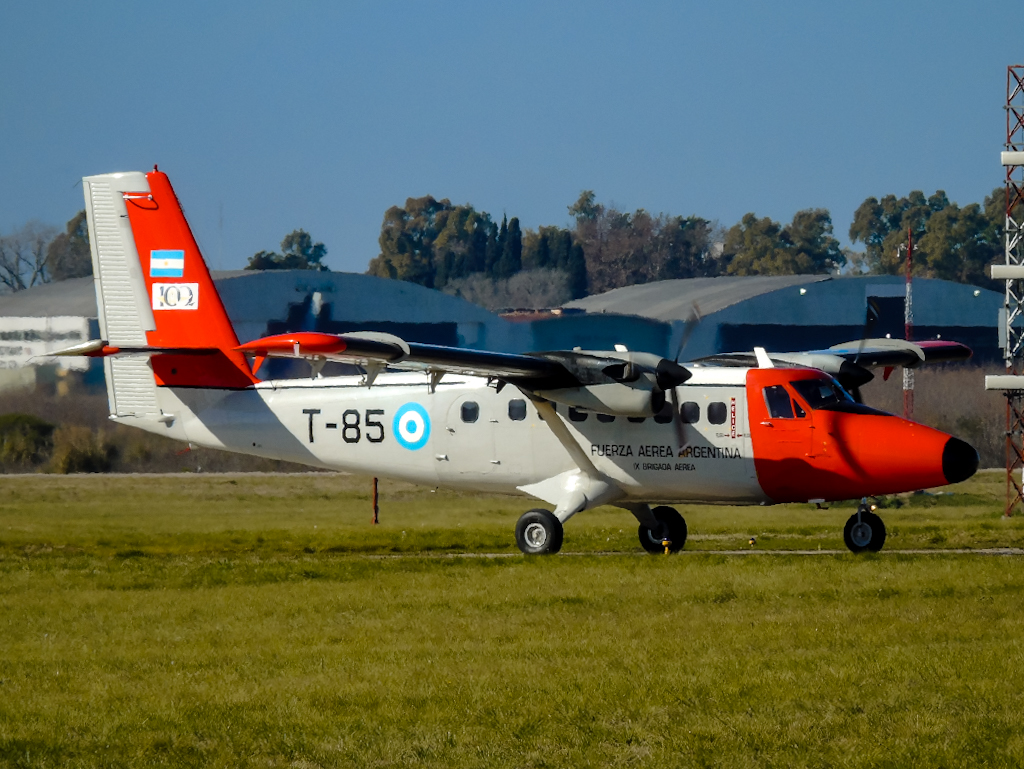
DHC-6-200 Twin Otter

== Rotary-wing aircraft ==
=== Autogyros ===
Aircraft	Origin	Type	Variant	Acquired	Notes
Cierva C.30	United Kingdom	observation		3	Retired; 1 preserved

=== Helicopters ===
Aircraft	Origin	Type	Variant	Acquired	Notes
Aérospatiale SA315	France	utility / SAR		9	
Bell 47	United States	utility / liaison	47G/J	3 / 1	Retired
Bell 212	United States	utility		6	
Bell 412	United States	utility		2	
Bell UH-1	United States	utility	D/H	4 / 1	
Boeing CH-47	United States	utility / transport	C	3	No longer in service
MD500 Defender	United States	observation	M	14	
Mi-171E	Russia	transport		2	For Antarctic use
Sikorsky S-58	United States	utility / transport	58T	2	Retired
Sikorsky S-61R	United States	VIP		1	Retired, preserved.
Sikorsky S-70	United States	VIP		1	

=== Gallery ===
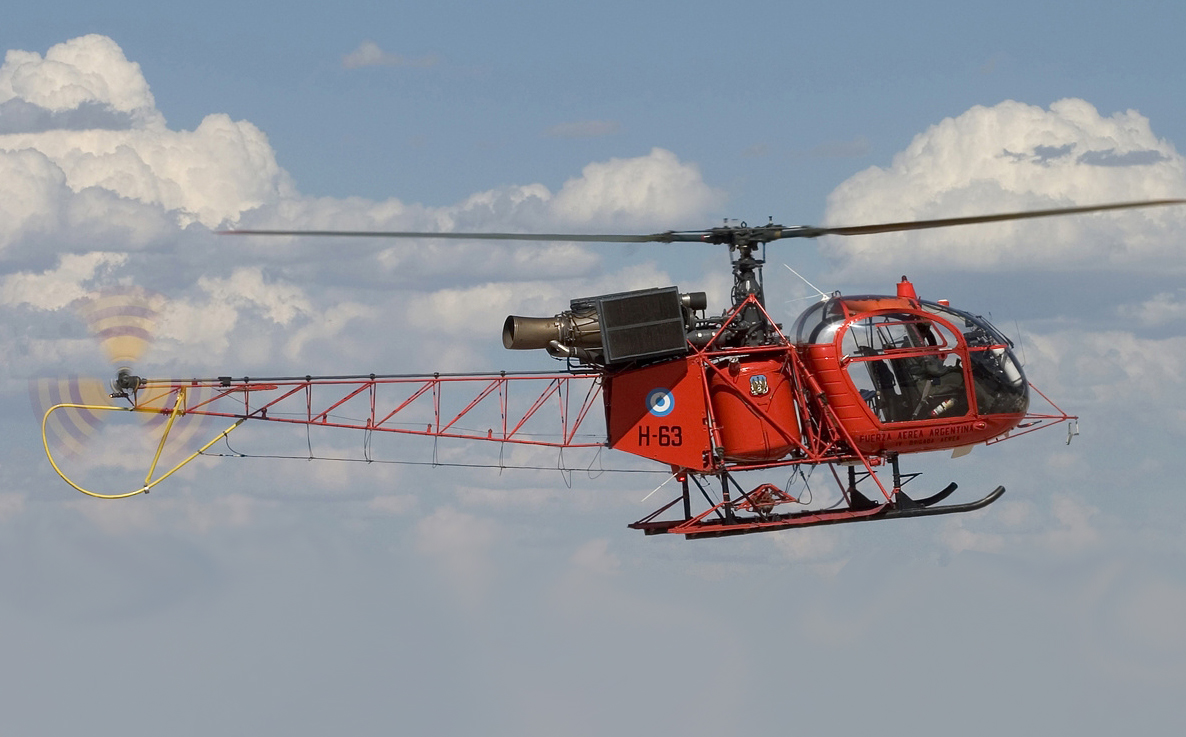
Aerospatiale SA-315B Lama

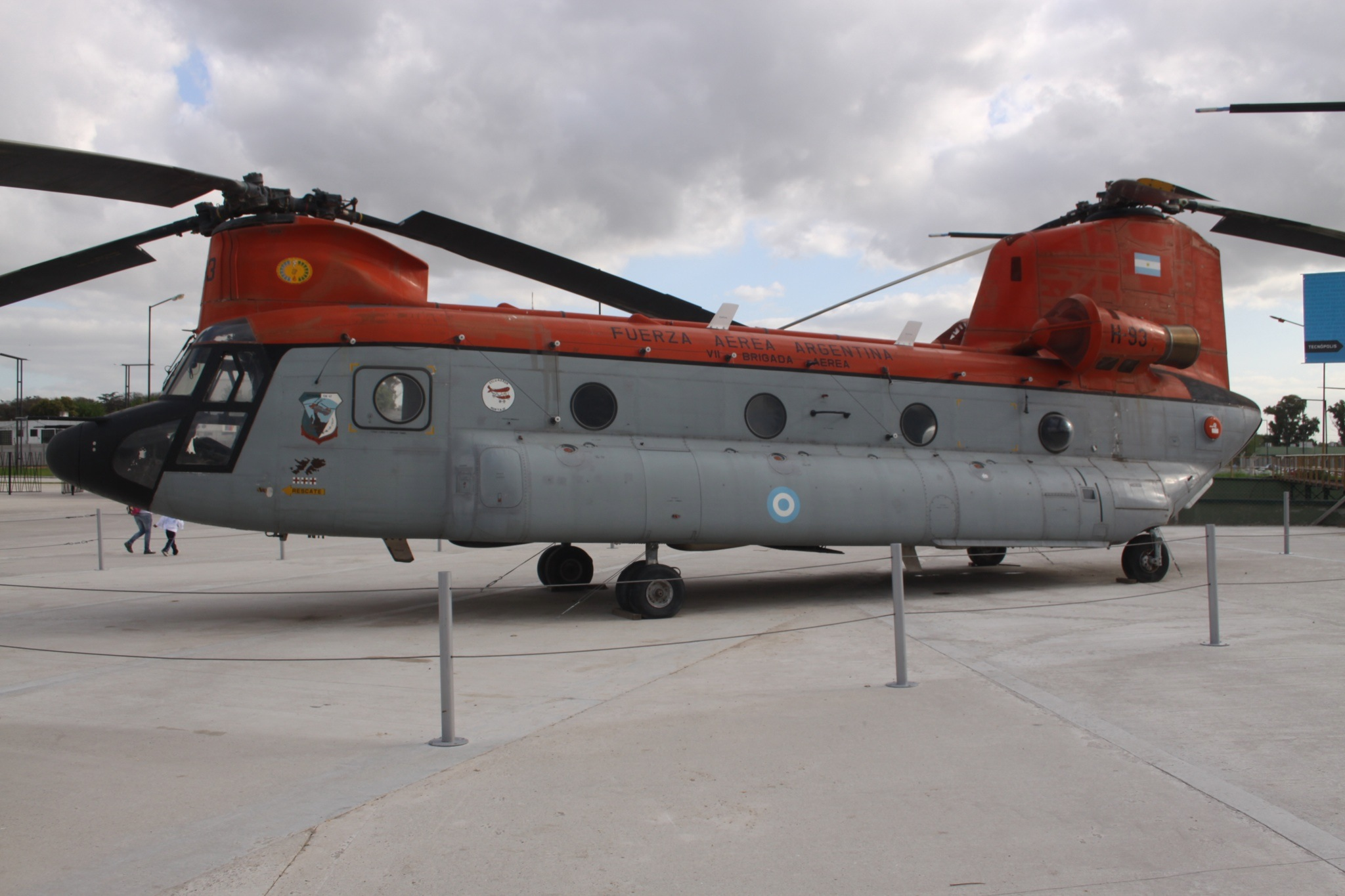
Boeing CH-47C

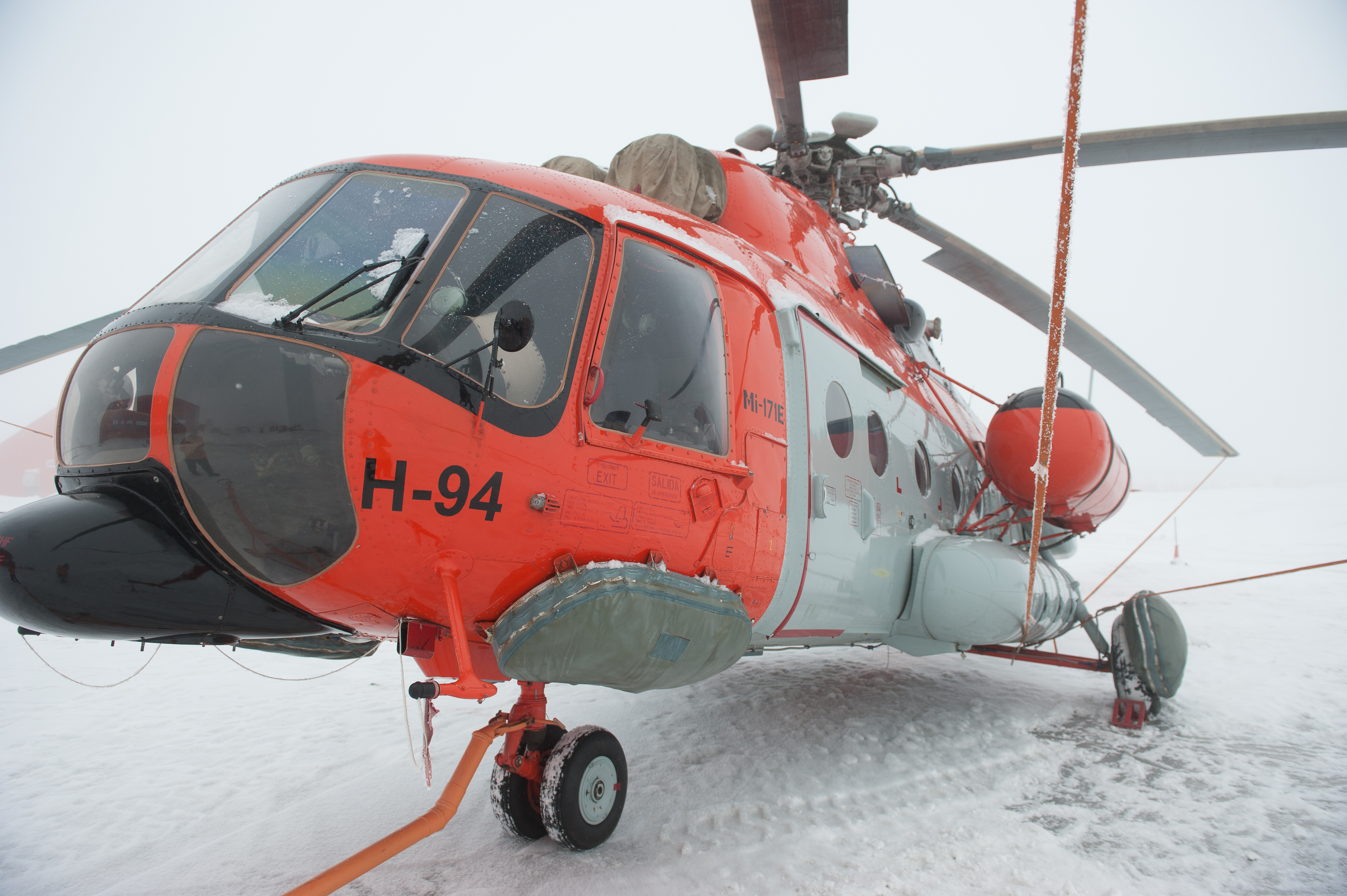
Mi-171E
