= Aero Boero AB-210 =

Argentine civil utility aircraft

AB-210

General information
- Type: Utility
- National origin: Argentine
- Manufacturer: Aero Boero
- Number built: 2

History
- First flight: 22 April 1971
- Developed from: Aero Boero AB-180

The Aero Boero AB-210 is an Argentine civil utility aircraft, a development of the AB-180 with improved performance delivered by a fuel-injected engine. Unlike previous aircraft by this manufacturer, it also featured tricycle undercarriage, but retained the same general high-wing configuration. Only a single prototype was built, first flying on 22 April 1971.

The aircraft was later re-engined with a more powerful Lycoming O-540 and redesignated the AB-260 (not to be confused with the unrelated Aero Boero 260AG). A second example was also built to this standard, but no serial production ensued.

== Variants ==
AB-210
The basic version developed from the AB-180, powered by a Continental IO-360 engine, one built.
AB-260
Further proposed development powered by a 260hp (194kW) Lycoming O-540 engine, one built.

== Specifications (AB-210) ==
Data from Jane's All The World's Aircraft 1971–72

General characteristics

- Crew: 1
- Capacity: 3 passengers
- Length: 7.40 m (24 ft 3 in)
- Wingspan: 10.42 m (34 ft 2 in)
- Height: 2.70 m (8 ft 10 in)
- Wing area: 16.40 m^{2} (176.5 sq ft)
- Aspect ratio: 6.7:1
- Airfoil: NACA 23012
- Empty weight: 670 kg (1,477 lb)
- Max takeoff weight: 1,100 kg (2,425 lb)
- Fuel capacity: 160 L (35.2 Imp Gallons)
- Powerplant: 1 × Continental IO-360 air-cooled flat-six, 160 kW (210 hp)

Performance

- Cruise speed: 225 km/h (140 mph, 121 kn) max cruise at 1,800 m (5,900ft)
- Stall speed: 64.5 km/h (40.1 mph, 34.8 kn) flaps down
- Range: 800 km (500 mi, 430 nmi) (max fuel)
- Service ceiling: 6,000 m (20,000 ft)
- Rate of climb: 6.0 m/s (1,180 ft/min)
