= Aero Boero 260AG =

General information
- Type: Agricultural aircraft
- National origin: Argentina
- Manufacturer: Aero Boero

History
- First flight: 23 December 1972

The Aero Boero 260AG is an Argentine agricultural aircraft that first flew in 1973. Despite the similarity in designation, it is completely different from and unrelated to the Aero Boero AB-260.

The 260AG is a low-wing monoplane with a single seat and fixed tailwheel undercarriage. Development commenced in 1971 as the AG.235/260, but various problems forced the project to stagnate and it was not revived until the 1990s.

== Specifications (AG.235/260) ==
Data from Jane's all the World's Aircraft 1988–89

General characteristics

- Crew: 1
- Capacity: 500 L (109.98 imp gal; 132.09 US gal) of liquid or 500 kg (1,102 lb) of powder.
- Length: 7.3 m (23 ft 11 in)
- Wingspan: 10.9 m (35 ft 9 in)
- Height: 2.04 m (6 ft 8 in)
- Wing area: 17.3 m^{2} (186 sq ft)
- Empty weight: 690 kg (1,521 lb)
- Max takeoff weight: 1,350 kg (2,976 lb)
- Powerplant: 1 × Textron Lycoming O-540-H2B5D 6-cyl horizontally-opposed air-cooled piston engine, 194 kW (260 hp)

Performance

- Never exceed speed: 250 km/h (160 mph, 130 kn)
- Range: 800 km (500 mi, 430 nmi)
- Service ceiling: 5,600 m (18,400 ft)

== See also ==
Aircraft of comparable role, configuration, and era

- Ayres Thrush
- CallAir A-9
- Cessna AgWagon
