= Aero Boero AB-180 =

Argentine civil utility aircraft

AB-180
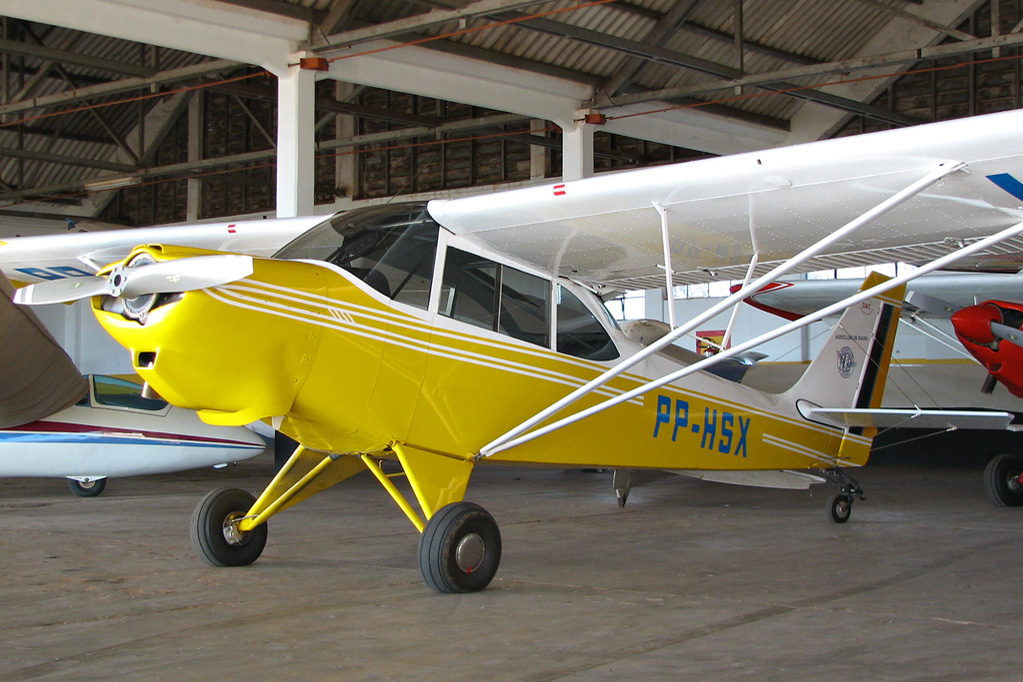

General information
- Type: Civil utility aircraft
- Manufacturer: Aero Boero

History
- Manufactured: 1969–2000
- Introduction date: 1969
- First flight: 1967
- Variant: Aero Boero AB-150

The Aero Boero AB-180 is an Argentine civil utility aircraft, a substantially improved development of the AB-95. It featured a more powerful engine and incorporated the aerodynamic changes made on the AB-115 and improved on them. The first example flew in 1967 and was in production until 2000.

== Variants ==
- AB-180RV – long-range version
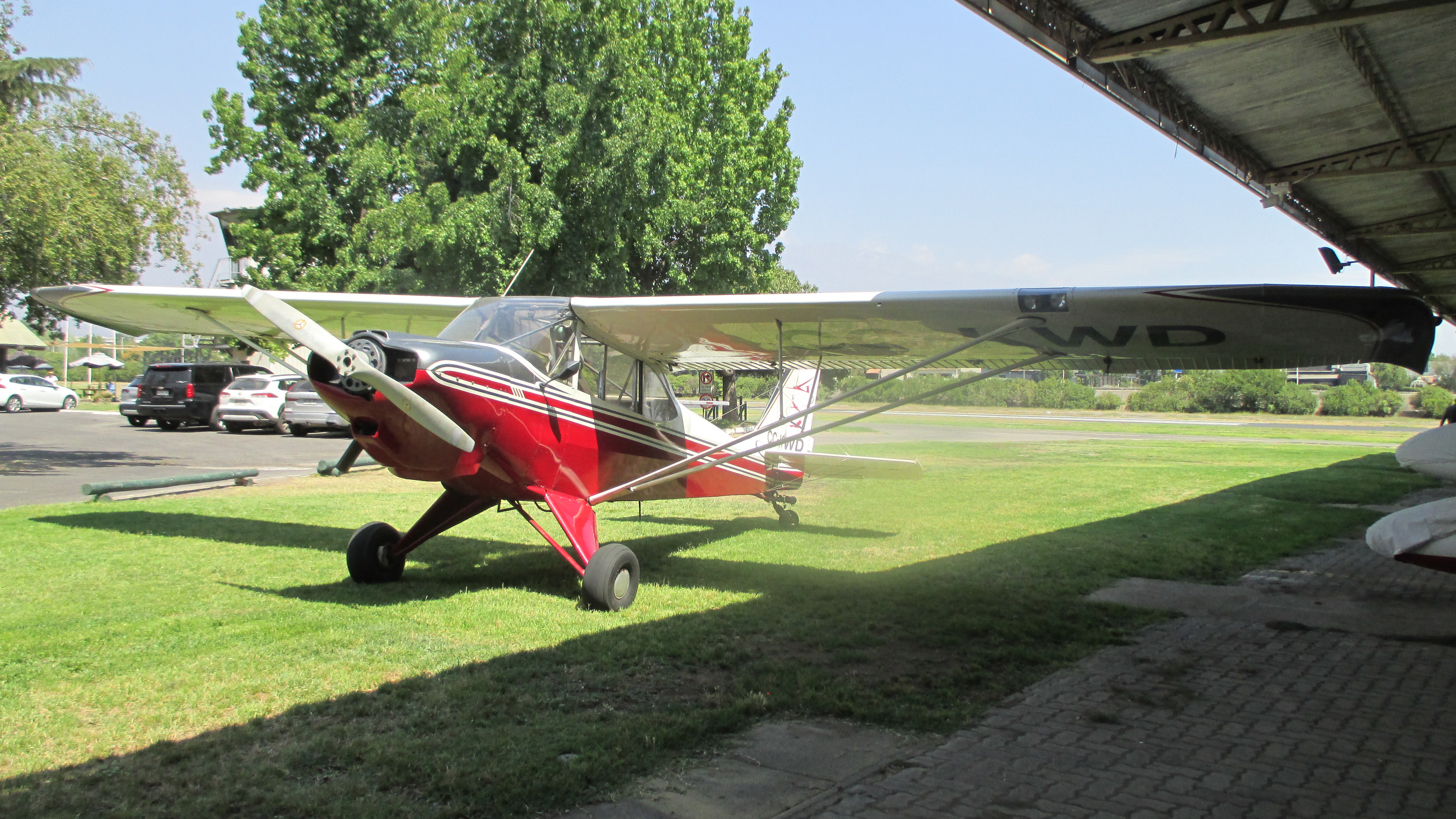
- a AeroBoero Ab180RVR
  AB-180RVR – glider tug
- AB-180 Condor – high-altitude version of 1971 with optional turbocharger (4 built)
- AB-180Ag – agricultural aircraft with 270 L (66 US gal) belly tank for chemicals
  - AB-180SP – 180Ag with an additional set of short wings to make a sesquiplane. In this variant, the agricultural application liquid is carried within the short wings, rather than in a belly tank. The added wings allow a fully loaded stall speed of 56 km/h (35 mph), compared to 89 km/h (55 mph) in the AB-180Ag.
- AB-180PSA – two-seat primary training aircraft

== Operators ==
Argentina

- Argentine Air Force
- Club de Planeadores Rosario
- Club de Planeadores Rafaela
- Club de Planeadores San Francisco
- Club de Planeadores Ceres
- Club de Planeadores Esperanza
- Club Argentino de Planeadores Albatros
- Club de Planeadores Córdoba
- Club de Planeadores Paraná
- Aeroclub Villa Dolores
- Club de Planeadores Otto Ballod

== Specifications (AB-180RVR) ==
Data from Jane's All The World's Aircraft 1993–94

General characteristics

- Crew: 1
- Capacity: 2 passengers
- Length: 7.08 m (23 ft 3 in)
- Wingspan: 10.78 m (35 ft 4 in)
- Height: 2.05 m (6 ft 9 in)
- Wing area: 17.41 m^{2} (187.4 sq ft)
- Aspect ratio: 6.67:1
- Airfoil: Modified NACA 23012
- Empty weight: 602 kg (1,327 lb)
- Max takeoff weight: 890 kg (1,962 lb)
- Fuel capacity: 200 L (53 US gal; 44 imp gal)
- Powerplant: 1 × Textron Lycoming O-360-A1A air-cooled flat-four, 130 kW (180 hp)

Performance

- Maximum speed: 225 km/h (140 mph, 121 kn) at sea level
- Cruise speed: 201 km/h (125 mph, 109 kn) at sea level
- Stall speed: 73 km/h (45 mph, 39 kn) (flaps down)
- Never exceed speed: 245 km/h (152 mph, 132 kn)
- Range: 1,180 km (730 mi, 640 nmi)
- Service ceiling: 7,000 m (23,000 ft) (at least)
- Rate of climb: 5.21 m/s (1,025 ft/min)
- Takeoff distance to 15m (50ft): 188 m (617 ft)
- Landing distance from 15m (50ft): 160 m (525 ft)

== See also ==
Related development

- Aero Boero 150
