= Aero Boero =

- Founded: 1956
- Headquarters: Morteros, Córdoba, Argentina
- Key people: Cesar Boero, Héctor Boero and Celestine Barale
- Products: Light aircraft
- Services: Repair and maintenance of light aircraft
- Owner: Héctor Boero

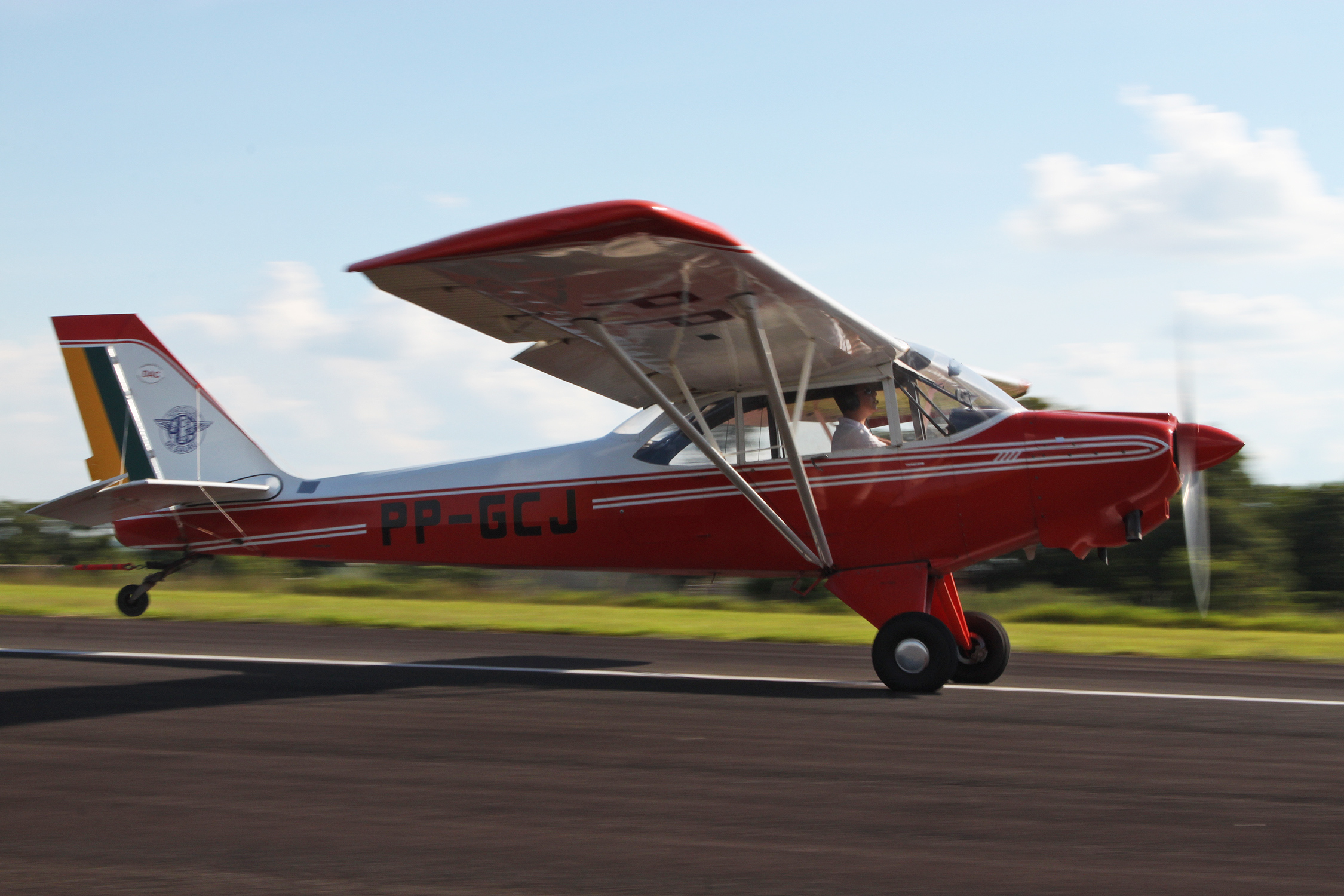
Aero Boero AB-180

Aero Boero S.A. is an Argentine aircraft manufacturer, established in 1956 by Héctor Boero in Morteros in Córdoba Province. It manufactured a range of light civil utility and agricultural aircraft.

== History ==
The company began as a repair and maintenance facility for light aircraft. Since the major civil aeronautical activity in the area in the 1950s was crop-dusting, most of the company's activities centered on agricultural aircraft. By 1958 the company principals felt they could build aircraft which could be used in such applications, and a trio of designers, brothers Cesar and Héctor Boero and Celestine Barale, began work on the -95. They continued upgrading and adding models until the middle of 2000, when a combination of political instability and economic downturn caused the company to cease aircraft production. Since that time the company has continued providing repair services and supplying spare parts for aircraft in the field.

== List of aircraft produced ==
Several of the models listed below are (or were) manufactured in several variants:

- Aero Boero AB-95 – Single-engine three-seat high-wing monoplane civil utility aircraft with 100 hp engine
- Aero Boero AB-115 – Development of AB-95 with 115 hp engine and improved aerodynamics
- Aero Boero AB-150 – Development of AB-115 with 150 hp engine
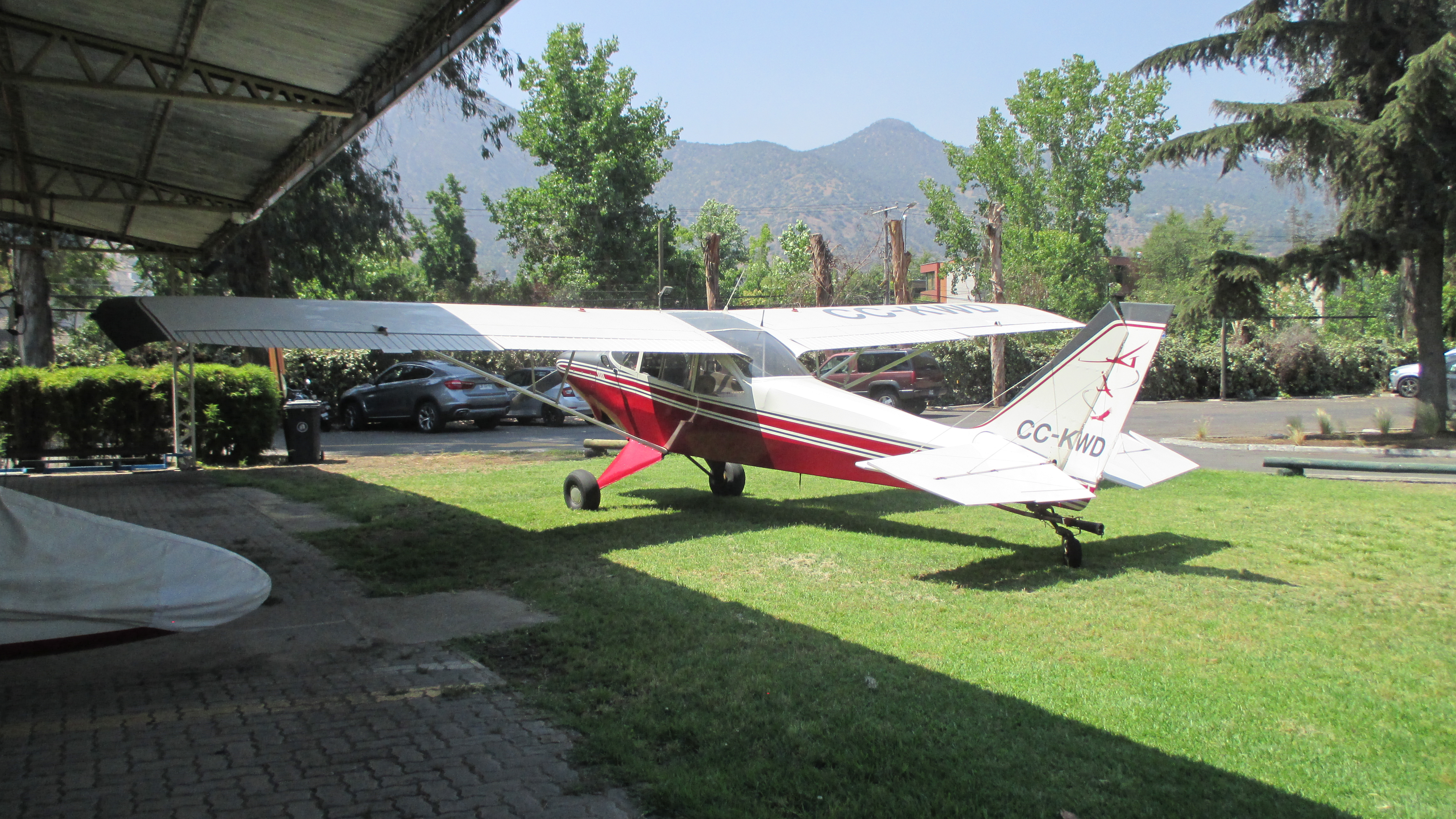
- A AeroBoero Ab180
  Aero Boero AB-180 – Development of AB-115 with 180 hp engine
- Aero Boero AB-210 – Development of AB-115 with 210 hp engine and tricycle undercarriage. One built
- Aero Boero AB-260 – Development of AB-115 with 260 hp engine and tricycle undercarriage. One built
- Aero Boero 260AG – Single-engine single-seat low-wing monoplane aerial application aircraft

== See also ==
- Chincul
- FAdeA
