= Aero Boero AB-150 =

Argentine civil utility aircraft

AB-150

General information
- Type: Utility
- National origin: Argentine
- Manufacturer: Aero Boero
- Number built: 5 (AB-150Ag only)

The Aero Boero AB-150 is an Argentine civil utility aircraft, developed in parallel with the AB-180 as a lower-cost, lower-powered version of that aircraft. Like the 180, it was produced by Aero Boero in long-range and agricultural variants.

== Variants ==
- AB-150 Ag :At least five built
- AB-150 RV :Orders for the AB-150RV were transferred to the Aero Boero AB-180RV

== Specifications (AB-150 Ag) ==
Data from Jane's All The World's Aircraft 1982–83

General characteristics

- Crew: 1
- Capacity: 2 passengers
- Length: 7.27 m (23 ft 10 in)
- Wingspan: 10.72 m (35 ft 2 in)
- Height: 2.10 m (6 ft 11 in)
- Wing area: 16.47 m^{2} (177.3 sq ft)
- Aspect ratio: 6.98:1
- Airfoil: NACA 23012 (modified)
- Empty weight: 590 kg (1,301 lb)
- Max takeoff weight: 1,001 kg (2,207 lb)
- Fuel capacity: 134 Litres
- Powerplant: 1 × Lycoming O-320-A2B air-cooled flat-four engine, 112 kW (150 hp)

Performance

- Maximum speed: 220 km/h (140 mph, 120 kn)
- Cruise speed: 152 km/h (94 mph, 82 kn) (econ cruise)
- Never exceed speed: 228 km/h (142 mph, 123 kn)

== See also ==
Related development:

- Aero Boero AB-180
