= Aero Boero AB-95 =

Small Argentine civil utility aircraft

AB-95
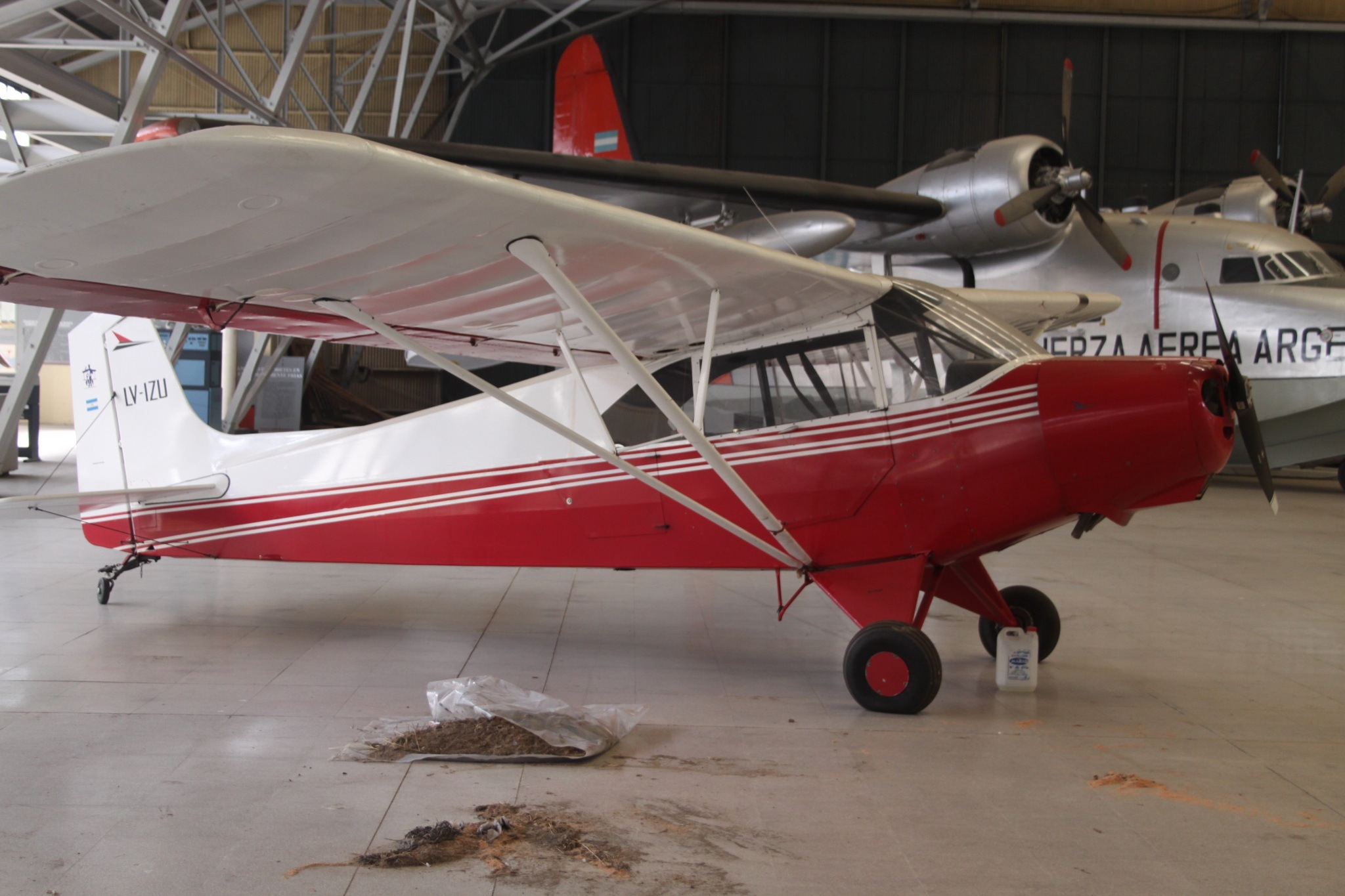
- Aero Boero 95 at Moron museum (Argentina)

General information
- Type: Light utility aircraft
- National origin: Argentina
- Manufacturer: Aero Boero S.A.
- Primary user: Aero Clubs

History
- Manufactured: 1961–1969
- Introduction date: 1961
- First flight: March 12, 1959
- Variant: Aero Boero AB-115

The Aero Boero AB-95 is a small Argentine civil utility aircraft that first flew on March 12, 1959. It was built by Aero Boero S.A. of Córdoba. The AB-95 is a conventional high-wing monoplane built of fabric-covered metal structure. It has fixed undercarriage.

== Variants ==
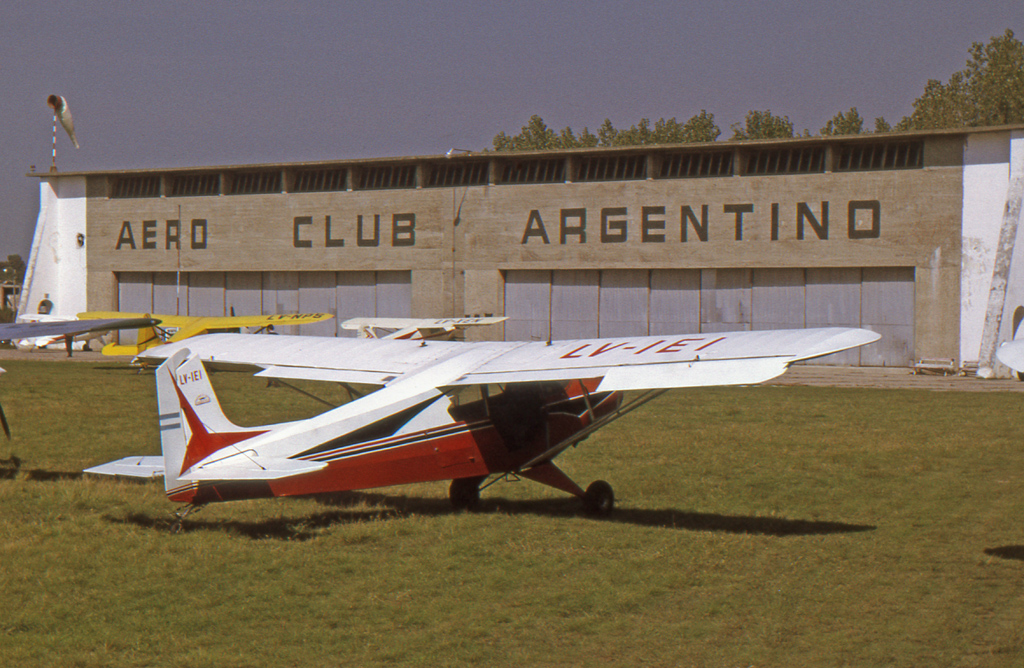
1961-built Aero Boero 95 at Buenos Aires - San Justo airfield in 1975

- AB-95 – basic production version. 95 h.p. Continental C-90-12F
  - AB-95A de Lujo – 75 kW (100 hp) Continental O-200-A engine.
  - AB-95A Fumigador – crop duster with O-200A engine, and a 55-Imp gallon (250 liters) chemical tank.
- AB-95B – 1963 version with 112 kW (150 hp) engine.
  - AB-115BS – air ambulance version fitted with a stretcher (25 built).
- AB-95-115 – 86 kW (115 hp) Textron Lycoming O-235 engine, more streamlined engine and main wheel fairings (45 built). Subsequently, this was developed into AB-115.

== Specifications (AB-95) ==
Data from Jane's All the World's Aircraft 1965-66

General characteristics

- Crew: One, pilot
- Capacity: 2 passengers
- Length: 6.90 m (22 ft 8 in)
- Wingspan: 10.42 m (34 ft 2 in)
- Height: 2.10 m (6 ft 11 in)
- Wing area: 16.36 m^{2} (176.1 sq ft)
- Aspect ratio: 6.5:1
- Airfoil: NACA 23012
- Empty weight: 422 kg (930 lb)
- Max takeoff weight: 700 kg (1,543 lb)
- Fuel capacity: 110 L (29 US gal; 24 imp gal)
- Powerplant: 1 × Continental C90-8F air-cooled 4-cylinder horizontally-opposed engine, 71 kW (95 hp)
- Propellers: 2-bladed Sensenich metal fixed-pitch propeller, 1.88 m (6 ft 2 in) diameter

Performance

- Maximum speed: 205 km/h (127 mph, 111 kn)
- Cruise speed: 160 km/h (99 mph, 86 kn) (econ cruise)
- Stall speed: 48 km/h (30 mph, 26 kn) flaps down
- Range: 960 km (600 mi, 520 nmi)
- Service ceiling: 5,200 m (17,100 ft)
- Rate of climb: 5.1 m/s (1,000 ft/min)
- Takeoff distance to 15 m (50 ft): 150 m (490 ft)
- Landing distance from 15 m (50 ft): 150 m (490 ft)

== See also ==
Related development

- Aero Boero AB-115

Aircraft of comparable role, configuration, and era

- Piper PA-12
