= Aero Boero AB-115 =

Argentine civil utility aircraft

AB-115 AB-115BS
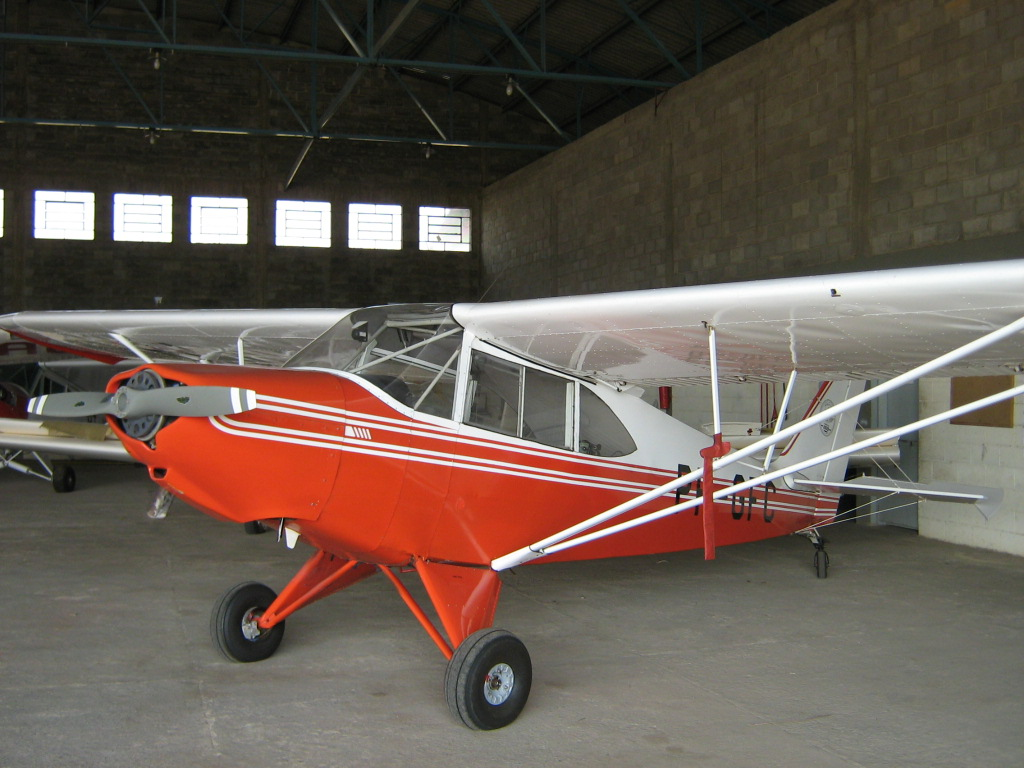

General information
- Type: Light training aircraft
- National origin: Argentina
- Manufacturer: Aero Boero
- Primary user: flying clubs
- Number built: 45+ (AB-115); 25 (AB-115BS)

History
- Manufactured: July 1969 – January 1973 (AB-115); February 1973–1975 (AB-115BS)
- Introduction date: 1970
- First flight: March 1969
- Developed from: Aero Boero AB-95

The Aero Boero AB-115 is an Argentine civil utility aircraft. It was developed from the AB-95-115, a refined AB-95 with a more powerful engine and improved aerodynamics. Specific differences included wheel spats, a redesigned engine cowling molded of fiberglass, and aluminum ailerons and flaps.

The type was successfully exported to Brazil, and used extensively as trainers by aero clubs.

Production of the AB-115 ended in January 1973. The following month a modified version, the -115BS, was flown. It featured greater wingspan, swept empennage members, and greater fuel capacity.

== Design ==
The AB-115 is a high-wing monoplane, with strut-braced rectangular wings (NACA 23012 profile). The wings are made of metal, the fuselage and empennage members are made of fabric-covered welded steel tubes. It is a development of Aero Boero's earlier AB-95.

The trainer version, the most common variant, contains two seats in tandem configuration, with the pilot-flying/student pilot in the front seat, and the instructor/pilot-not-flying seating in the rear. Behind the rear seat there is a cargo hold, with capacity of up to 25 kg (55 lb). The front seat has a three-point seatbelt, while the rear one has a simple, abdominal belt. Both occupants enter and exit the aircraft through one single, large door in the right side of the cockpit.

The flight commands are duplicated, with the front seat's center stick, throttle lever, rudder pedals and brake pedals mechanically connected to the rear seat's. The rear stick and the throttle lever can be disassembled when carrying passenger(s).

The primary flight commands are actuated by cables and pulleys. The ailerons and flaps are made of aluminum alloy, while the rudder and elevators are made of steel tubes and fabric. The flaps have four positions (neutral, 15°, 30° and 45°), and are actuated manually, by a lever in the upper left part of the cockpit. The pitch trim tab is located in the trailing edge of the left elevator, and is actuated by a handle in the left side of the cockpit. The rudder and the left aileron also have ground-adjustable trim tabs.

A Lycoming O-235-C2A air-cooled engine, rated at 115 hp (85.8 kW), drives a Sensenich Propeller model 72 CK-050, metallic fixed-pitch twin-bladed propeller. The fuel system uses a FACET MA 3PA carburetor, equipped with carburetor heat. Electrical power is supplied by a Prestolite alternator. The ignition system is driven by dual Bendix Scintilla S5LN magnetos; the starter motor is also by Prestolite. The engine incorporates a wet crankcase, and the lubricant is cooled by an oil radiator in the front of the engine's air intake, which is triggered by a bi-metallic thermostatic valve.

The maximum fuel capacity is 115 liters, with 110 liters usable. The engine can use gasoline of 80/87 to 100/130 octane. Each wing contains an aluminum fuel tank in the root. Fuel quantity is indicated by sight glasses in the wing roots. There are two separate fuel selectors, for each tank, which can be independently opened and closed.

The aircraft uses a conventional undercarriage. Each main gear is fixed to the fuselage at three points – two articulated joints, plus one shock absorber. The wheels are made of aluminum alloy and magnesium, and are equipped with independent hydraulic-actuated brakes. There is no parking brake; when parked, it must be secured by chocks. The tailwheel is connected to the rudder by bungee springs, and it can also rotate freely when "unlocked".

The instrument panel is, since the AB-115 is mostly used for basic flight training. The flight instruments are an airspeed indicator, altimeter, VSI a turn coordinator, and a magnetic compass. The engine instruments are a tachometer, oil pressure and oil temperature indicators, and an ammeter. The panel includes one Bendix/King VHF radio and one Bendix/King transponder. The cabin instruments are flood-lit; the light operates when the running lights are on. The right wing has two landing lights, which have a five-minute continuous operating limit.

== Variants ==
Aero Boero AB-115BS
Civil utility/Ambulance version.

Aero Boero AB-115 Trainer
Trainer version.

Aero Boero AB-115/150
Version with more powerful 150 hp Lycoming O-320 engine. Can be used for crop spraying.

== Specifications (AB-115BS) ==
Data from Jane's All the World's Aircraft 1976–77; Uberlandia Aeroclub's AB-115 Technical Manual

General characteristics

- Crew: 1
- Capacity: 2 passengers
- Length: 7.273 m (23 ft 10 in)
- Wingspan: 10.72 m (35 ft 2 in)
- Height: 2.1 m (6 ft 11 in)
- Wing area: 16.47 m^{2} (177.3 sq ft)
- Aspect ratio: 7.05:1
- Airfoil: NACA 23012
- Empty weight: 530 kg (1,168 lb)
- Max takeoff weight: 770 kg (1,698 lb)
- Fuel capacity: 130 L (34 US gal; 29 imp gal) in two wing tanks
- Powerplant: 1 × Textron Lycoming O-235-C2A 4-cylinder air-cooled horizontally-opposed piston engine, 86 kW (115 hp)
- Propellers: 2-bladed Sensenich 72CK-050 fixed-pitch propeller

Performance

- Maximum speed: 210 km/h (130 mph, 110 kn) at sea level
- Cruise speed: 188 km/h (117 mph, 102 kn) at sea level
- Stall speed: 72 km/h (45 mph, 39 kn)
- Rate of climb: 5.1 m/s (1,000 ft/min)
- Wing loading: 47.1 kg/m^{2} (9.6 lb/sq ft)
- Power/mass: 8.98 kg/kW (14.77 lb/hp)
- Take-off run: 115 m (377 ft) (full load)
- Landing run: 45 m (148 ft) heavy braking
- Take-off run to 15 m (49 ft): 185 m (607 ft)
- Landing run from 15 m (49 ft): 150 m (490 ft)

== See also ==
Related development

- Aero Boero AB-95
