= Twin-fuselage aircraft =

Aircraft configuration utilizing two main fuselages

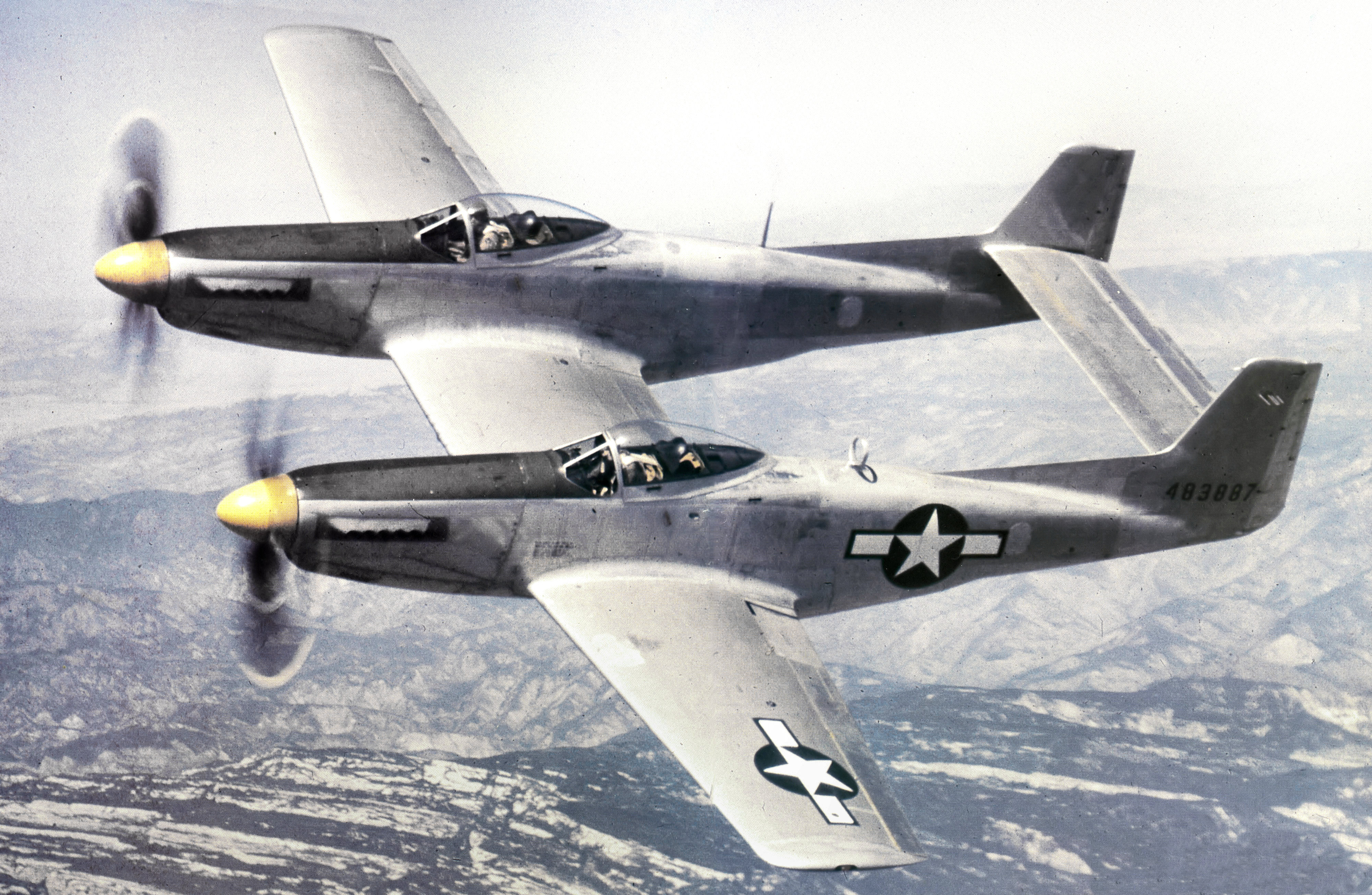
The North American XP-82 Twin Mustang

A twin-fuselage aircraft has two main fuselages. It is distinct from the twin-boom configuration which has a single main fuselage with two subsidiary boom structures.

Twin fuselages have been adopted for various reasons, and a few types have entered production.

== Early seaplanes ==
A twin-float arrangement offers stability on the water without the need for wing tip stabilising floats. Mounting the float immediately below, or integrally with, the fuselage provides a strong airframe with minimal additional weight. During and after World War I a number of such twin-fuselage floatplanes and twin-hulled flying boats were constructed, and a few entered production.

As early as 1913, the Radley-England Waterplane racing flying boat demonstrated the concept at the hands of pilot Gordon England.

The Twin Blackburn of 1915 was a long-range floatplane for anti-Zeppelin patrol. A handful of production examples were delivered but few were used operationally.

Savoia-Marchetti produced two twin-hulled flying boat types. The S.55 multirole flying boat first flew in 1924. It was built in large numbers, including both civil and military variants. The later S.66 airliner of 1931 sold less well.

== The heavy bomber ==
During WWI, Caproni introduced one of the first production landplanes to feature twin fuselages, in the Ca.4 heavy bomber, manufacturing around 50 aircraft in a range of variants.

== The heavy glider tug ==
During World War II the need arose for a heavy glider tug capable of towing the large Gotha Go 242 and even larger Messerschmitt Me 321 Gigant. The Heinkel He 111Z Zwilling (twin) was created by joining two He 111 fuselages with a new wing centre section and adding a fifth central engine. Although liked by its pilots when it first flew in 1941, even the 111Z could not tow a fully laden Gigant, and although a small batch became operational they saw little action.

A few variants were developed for roles such as long-range reconnaissance or air-launched anti-ship missile carrier, but none entered service.

== Heavy fighters ==
During World War II a need arose for a heavy fighter, which could not be met by a new design proposal in a reasonable time frame. Joining two examples of an existing light fighter aircraft was one way to achieve this.

The German Messerschmitt Bf 109Z twin (Zwilling) Bf 109 prototype was destroyed in an attack by the British in 1943 before it was completed, and the project subsequently abandoned. The later Me 609 twin Me 309 project was never built.

In 1944 Dornier proposed the Dornier Do 635 long-range reconnaissance variant of the Do 335 Pfeil heavy fighter, to have twin Do 335 fuselages and four engines. It was never built.

The Italian Savoia-Marchetti SM.92 prototype was unusual in being an adaptation of a twin-boom design but did not enter production.

The North American F-82 Twin Mustang arrived too late to enter service during the War but later saw service in the Korean War.

== Space launchers ==
More recently the idea of a dedicated re-usable large mothership, capable of carrying and launching a spacecraft, has gained interest. The twin fuselage configuration offers the advantage of a clean payload area underneath the wing centre section, without the need for exceptional ground clearance beneath the fuselages.

Early concepts included the Conroy Virtus and Twin-fuselage Lockheed C-5 Galaxy Shuttle transport aircraft of 1974.

Following the success of the Scaled Composites White Knight prototype the White Knight Two was developed and built, with the first example VMS Eve designed to carry the SpaceShipTwo suborbital passenger craft for Virgin Galactic.

The Scaled Composites Stratolaunch, informally known as the Roc, has the longest wingspan of any aircraft ever flown, at 385 feet (117 m). It is owned by Stratolaunch Systems, who are currently developing the air-launched spacecraft envisaged as its payload.

NASA have flown a scaled-down demonstrator of a rocket-assisted Towed glider air-launch system, in which the laden twin-fuselage mothership is towed to altitude as a glider and released. Its rocket engine then ignites, propelling it to a speed and altitude greater than those of the tow plane. The payload spacecraft is then released.

== Significant one-offs ==
The Fouga CM.88 Gemeaux is constructed from two Fouga CM.8 gliders. It was used as an engine testbed for many years, with either a single engine mounted centrally above the wing or twin engines above each fuselage.

The Boerboon & Coller Yak-110 is an aerobatic type conceived to be eyecatchingly different. Featuring twin Yak-55 fuselages with a third, centrally mounted jet engine, it is the only trimotor cleared for unlimited aerobatics and performs at events in the USA.

== List of twin-fuselage aircraft ==
Dates given are of first flight or, for those which never flew, of project announcement.

Type	Country	Class	Role	Date	Status	No.	Notes
Anadva Type V.H.	Russia	Propeller	Light bomber	1916	Prototype	3	aka Анадва тип В.Х. The first two prototypes were land-based, the third was fitted with floats.
Belyayev DB-LK	USSR	Propeller	Bomber	1940	Prototype	1	
Bestetti BN.1	Italy	Propeller	Private	1940			Sportplane.
Blackburn T.B.	UK	Propeller	Patrol	1915	Production	9	Floatplane.
Blériot 125	France	Propeller	Transport	1931	Prototype	1	12 seat airliner.
Boerboon & Coller Yak-110	USA	Mixed	Private	2018	Operational	1	Two joined Yakovlev Yak-55s. Trimotor with two tractor props and one jet engine.
Caproni Ca.4	Italy	Propeller	Bomber and transport	1915	Production	44+	Series of types.
Climate Impulse	Switzerland	Propeller	Experimental	2025	Prototype	1	Hydrogen powered twin-engined monoplane, intended to make a non-stop circumnavigation. Currently under construction.
Conroy Virtus	USA	Propeller	Transport	1974	Project	0	Shuttle transport
DARPA General Atomics Liberty Lifter	USA	Propeller	Transport	2022	Project	0	Design proposal, lost to competitor.
Dornier Do 635	Germany	Propeller	Fighter	1944	Project	0	Twin Dornier Do 335 Pfeil proposal.
Twin Ercoupe	USA	Propeller		1946		1	Twin ERCO Ercoupe one-off conversion.
Fauvel AV.28	France	Propeller	Fighter	1940	Project	0	Two-seater twin-engine fighter project.
Fokker K.I	Germany	Propeller		1915	Prototype	1	Kampfflugzeug (twin fuselage with nacelle)
Fouga CM.88 Gemeaux	France	Jet	Experimental	1951	Operational	1	Twin Cyclope, jet engine testbed, 2 built
General Aircraft Twin Hotspur	UK	Glider	Experimental	1942		1	Twin General Aircraft Hotspur
Goodhart Newbury Manflier	UK	Propeller	Experimental	1979	Prototype	1	A two-place human-powered aircraft, by Nicholas Goodhart. 138 ft wingspan, and each pilot sitting in fuselages 70 ft apart.
Heinkel He 111Z	Germany	Propeller	Utility	1941	Production	15	Glider tug. Variant of the He 111.
KZHBV ASC	USSR	Propeller	Utility	1935	Prototype	1	Amphibious flying boat.
Labourdette-Halbronn H.T.1	France	Propeller	Torpedo bomber	1918	Prototype	1	Flying boat. One H.T.1 (1918) flown.
Labourdette-Halbronn H.T.2	France	Propeller	Torpedo bomber	1919	Prototype	2	Flying boat. Two H.T.2 (1919) flown.
Twin fuselage Lockheed C-5 Galaxy	USA	Jet	Transport	1974	Project	0	Shuttle transport aircraft proposal.
Messerschmitt Bf 109Z	Germany	Propeller	Fighter	1943	Project	0	Twin Bf 109 prototype. Destroyed while under construction.
Messerschmitt Me 609	Germany	Propeller	Fighter	1941	Project	0	Twin Me 309 proposal.
North American F-82 Twin Mustang	USA	Propeller	Fighter	1945	Production	272	Long-range.
Pipistrel Taurus G4	Slovenia	Propeller	Experimental	2011	Prototype	1	Electric aircraft. Winner of the 2011 Green Flight Challenge.
Radley-England Waterplane	UK	Propeller	Racing Aircraft	1913	Prototype	1	Damaged, rebuilt in modified form as Waterplane 2.
Ricci R.1	Italy	Propeller		1917	Prototype		Flying-boat
Savoia-Marchetti S.55	Italy	Propeller	Multirole	1924	Production	243+	Flying boat.
Savoia-Marchetti S.66	Italy	Propeller	Transport	1931	Production	24	Flying boat.
Savoia-Marchetti SM.92	Italy	Propeller	Fighter	1943	Prototype	1	
Scaled Composites Model 348 White Knight Two	USA	Jet	Spacecraft launcher	2008	Prototype	1	
Scaled Composites Model 351 Roc	USA	Jet	Spacecraft launcher	2019	Prototype	1	Launcher for Stratolaunch spacecraft.
Snead LRH	USA	Glider	Experimental	1942	Prototype	1	Military twin-hull amphibious glider. Abandoned before completion.
SSAKTB SL-2P	Lithuania	Glider	Experimental	1987	Prototype	1	Flying laboratory, made from two LET L-13 Blaník gliders.
Thomas-Morse MB-4	USA	Propeller	Utility	1920	Prototype	2+	Mail plane
Towed glider air-launch system	USA		Spacecraft launcher	2013	Project	0	NASA Dryden
Tupolev ANT-22	USSR	Propeller		1934	Prototype	1	Flying boat.
Voisin Type O	France	Propeller		1914	Prototype	1	Made by merging two Voisin Type M aircraft.
Wagner Twin Cub	USA	Propeller		1952	Prototype	1	Twin Piper Cub one-off conversion.
Wight Twin Seaplane	UK	Propeller		1916	Prototype	4	Variant of the Wight Twin Landplane of twin boom configuration.

== See also ==
- Asymmetrical aircraft
- Composite aircraft
