= Blériot 125 =

French airliner

125
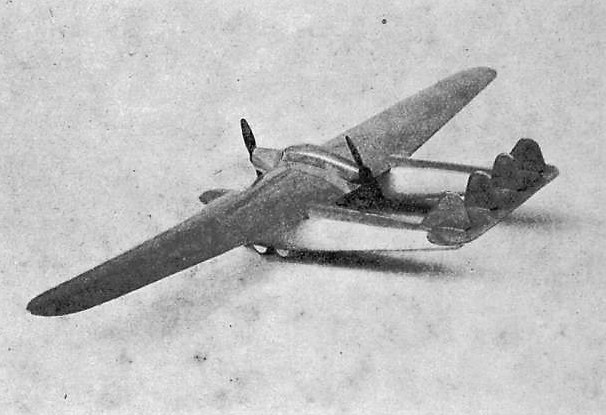
- Wind tunnel model

General information
- Type: Airliner
- Manufacturer: Blériot
- Designer: Leon Kirste
- Status: scrapped
- Number built: 1

History
- First flight: 9 March 1931

The Blériot 125 (or Bl-125) was a highly unusual French airliner of the early 1930s. Displayed at the 1930 Salon de l'Aéronautique in Paris, it featured accommodation for twelve passengers in separate twin fuselages. Between them, these pods shared a tailplane and a high wing. The centre section of wing joined the fuselage pods and also carried a nacelle that contained an engine at either end and the crew compartment in the middle. When flown the following year, it displayed very poor flight characteristics and although attempts to improve it continued on into 1933, certification could not be achieved and the sole prototype was scrapped the following year.

== Specifications ==
General characteristics

- Crew: two pilots and one navigator
- Capacity: 12 passengers
- Length: 13.83 m (45 ft 4 in)
- Wingspan: 29.4 m (96 ft 5 in)
- Height: 4.0 m (13 ft 1 in)
- Wing area: 100.0 m^{2} (1,076 sq ft)
- Empty weight: 4,440 kg (9,789 lb)
- Gross weight: 7,260 kg (16,006 lb)
- Powerplant: 2 × Hispano-Suiza 12Hbr , 410 kW (550 hp) each

Performance

- Maximum speed: 220 km/h (137 mph, 119 kn)
- Range: 1,000 km (621 mi, 540 nmi)
