= Wight Twin =

British large twin-engined aircraft

Twin
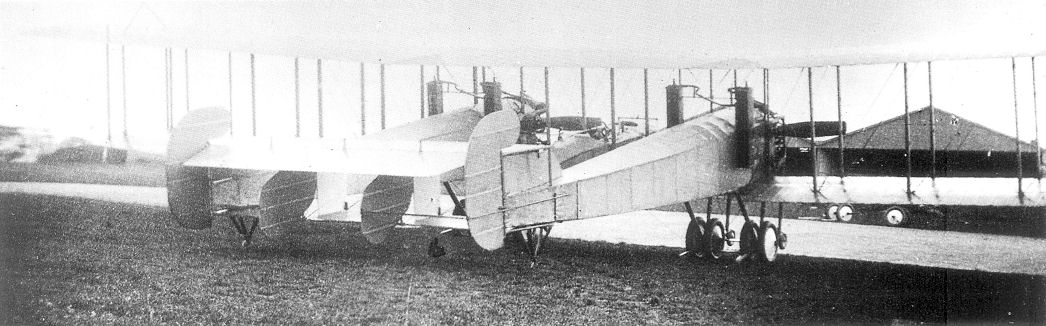

General information
- Type: Torpedo bomber
- Manufacturer: J. Samuel White
- Designer: Howard T Wright
- Number built: 4

History
- First flight: 1915 (Twin Landplane)

The Wight Twin was a British large twin-engined aircraft of the First World War. It was a twin-engined, twin boom biplane. One was built as a landplane for France, while three more similar aircraft were built as Seaplanes for the British Royal Naval Air Service. Both versions were unsuccessful and saw no service.

== Development and design ==
In summer 1914, just before the outbreak of the First World War, the French government ordered a single example of a twin-engined bomber from the Samuel White shipyard in Cowes, Isle of Wight. The result, designed by Howard T. Wright, chief designer of White's aircraft department (which operated as Wight Aircraft after its location), was a very large twin boom biplane with five-bay folding wings, powered by two 200 hp (149 kW) Salmson water-cooled radial engines fitted in the front of the fuselage booms. The crew of three was housed in a small central nacelle between the twin booms and situated on the lower wing.

The Twin Landplane was completed in July 1915, and was found to have adequate flying characteristics during testing at Eastchurch during August. In September 1915, however, a French test pilot crashed the Twin Landplane during acceptance testing, and the contract for the aircraft was cancelled.

At the same time, the British Admiralty required a long range aircraft capable of carrying the 18 inch torpedoes thought necessary to sink large warships. An order was therefore placed with Samuel White's for a large torpedo carrying aircraft. The resulting Twin Seaplane was based closely on the Twin Landplane, with the central nacelle removed and cockpits for the crew of two fitted in the two fuselages behind the wings. The first prototype, which was delayed by the unavailability of the engines, was completed in 1916, but proved during testing to be unable to carry both a torpedo and a full fuel load. Two modified aircraft followed, with longer float struts and new tail surfaces. These two aircraft also proved underpowered, and the type was abandoned, with the last Twin Seaplane written off in 1917.

== Specifications (Twin Seaplane) ==
Data from Wight Elephants

General characteristics

- Crew: Two
- Length: 43 ft 9 in (13.33 m)
- Wingspan: 84 ft 0 in (25.6 m) ^{[a]}
- Powerplant: 2 × Salmson water-cooled radial engine , 200 hp (149 kW) each

Performance

- Maximum speed: 80 mph (128 km/h, 70 kn)
- Endurance: 5 hours

Armament

- 1x .303 in Lewis gun
- One 18 in (45.7 cm) torpedo or two 500 lb (227 kg) bombs

== See also ==
Aircraft of comparable role, configuration, and era

- AD Seaplane Type 1000
- Blackburn Twin Blackburn
