= North American F-82 Twin Mustang =

Post-War USAAF/USAF all-weather interceptor

P-82/F-82 Twin Mustang
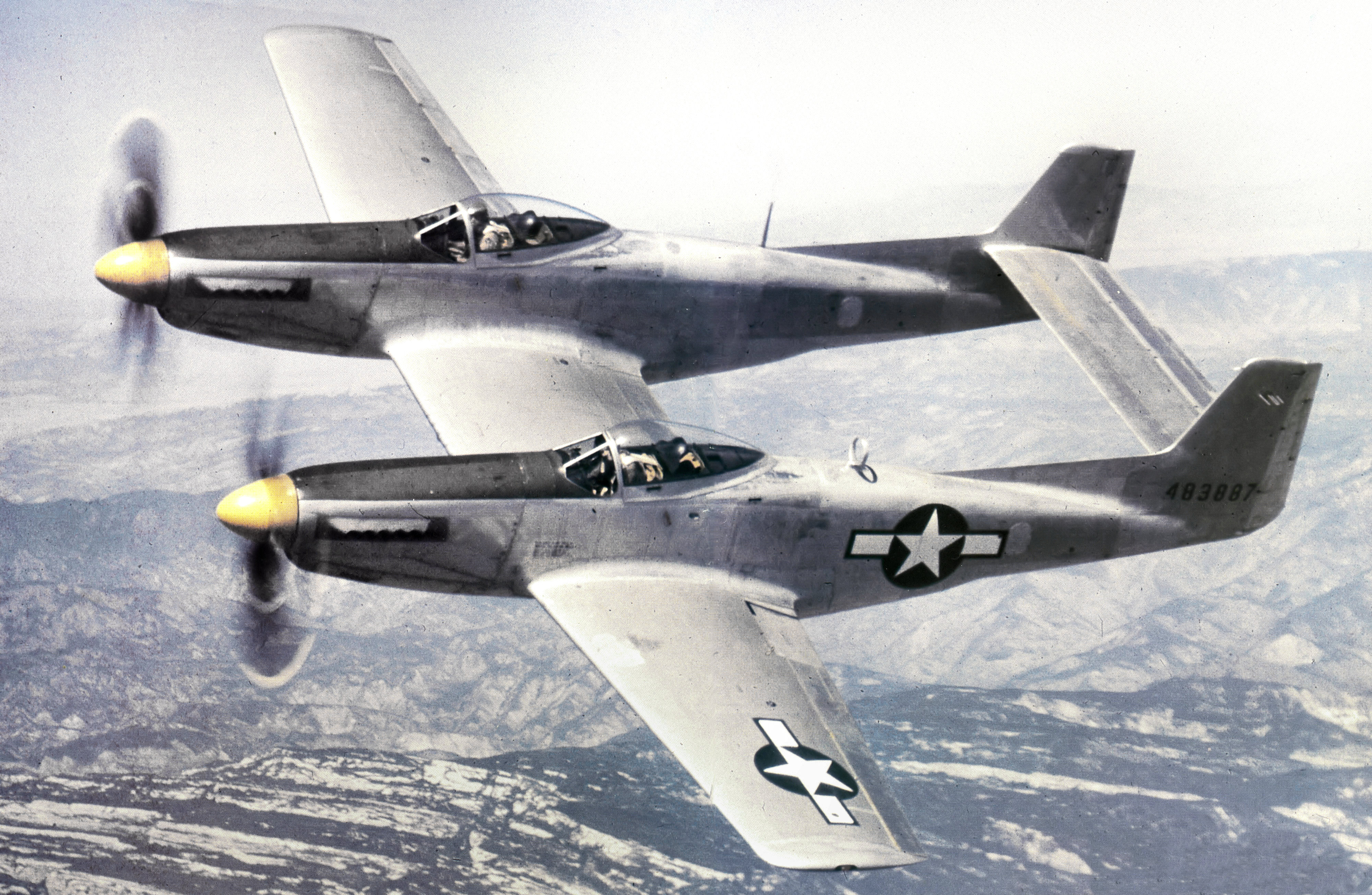
- XP-82

General information
- Type: Long-range escort fighter; Night fighter; All-weather interceptor
- National origin: United States
- Manufacturer: North American Aviation
- Status: Retired
- Primary user: United States Air Force
- Number built: 272 or 273

History
- Introduction date: 1946
- Retired: 1953

The North American F-82 Twin Mustang was a long-range twin-fuselage escort fighter, designed and produced by the American aircraft manufacturer North American Aviation. It shared limited commonality with the preceding North American P-51 Mustang.

The F-82 was designed during World War II as an escort for the Boeing B-29 Superfortress strategic bombers flying long range missions against Imperial Japan; however, the conflict ended before development could be completed. Despite the name, there was little in common between the Twin Mustang and the more conventional North American P-51 Mustang, the former being a clean sheet design that shared a minority of components with the latter. The XP-82 prototype performed its maiden flight on 15 June 1945, and the type was introduced to United States Army Air Force (USAAF) service one year later. While the end of WW2 had slowed production, the emergence of the Cold War gave renewed importance to the project as the Twin Mustang was procured as an interim solution to the fighter escort mission for the USAAF's strategic bomber force; it was also suitable for use as an all-weather air defense interceptor. On 27 February 1947, a P-82B flown by Colonel Robert E. Thacker made the longest non-stop flight ever conducted by a piston-engined aircraft, flying nonstop from Hawaii to New York without refueling and covering a distance of 5,051 mi (8,129 km) in 14 hours and 32 minutes.

Upon the creation of the United States Air Force (USAF) in 1948, the new service inherited the P-82 fleet (redesignating it F-82) and placed it under the Strategic Air Command (SAC), which used the type as a long-range escort fighter. Furthermore, radar-equipped F-82s were flown extensively by the Air Defense Command (ADC) as replacement all-weather day/night interceptors for the wartime Northrop P-61 Black Widow. During the Korean War, Japanese-based F-82s were among the first USAF aircraft to operate over Korea; the first three North Korean aircraft destroyed by U.S. forces were shot down by F-82s, the first being a North Korean Yak-11 downed over Gimpo Airfield by the USAF 68th Fighter Squadron. However, the appearance of the jet-powered Mikoyan-Gurevich MiG-15 over North Korea in late 1950 quickly demonstrated its ability to outmatch many USAF combat aircraft; accordingly, the type was removed from ADC service during the early 1950s, having been superseded by the Lockheed F-94 Starfire jet fighter. Following the introduction of the jet-powered Boeing B-52 Stratofortress strategic bomber, the escort fighter role was considered to have become obsolete and SAC stood down its last strategic fighter escort wings in 1957.

== Design and development ==
Development of the F-82 Twin Mustang can be traced back to 1942 and the issuing of an Advanced Development Objective that sought the development of new escort fighters. To effectively fight World War II, Allied military planners recognised that they needed to undermine the Axis powers by heavily damaging their industrial economies across both Europe and Japan prior to conducting conclusive operations such as the planned U.S. invasion of the Japanese home islands. While the United States Army Air Force's (USAAF) were in the set to introduce the Boeing B-29 Superfortress, a new bomber capable of flying missions exceeding 2,000 mi (3,200 km), such as from either the Solomon Islands to Tokyo, this was beyond the range of the Lockheed P-38 Lightning and the conventional North American P-51 Mustang. Accordingly, there was a recognised need for a very long-range (VLR) escort fighter that would be able to guard the B-29 throughout its lengthy flight to Japan, rather than leaving them unprotected against interception by enemy fighters. Accordingly, a design team at North American, led by Aviation Assistant Chief Designer Edgar Schmued, started work on designing a suitable long-range escort aircraft in late 1943.

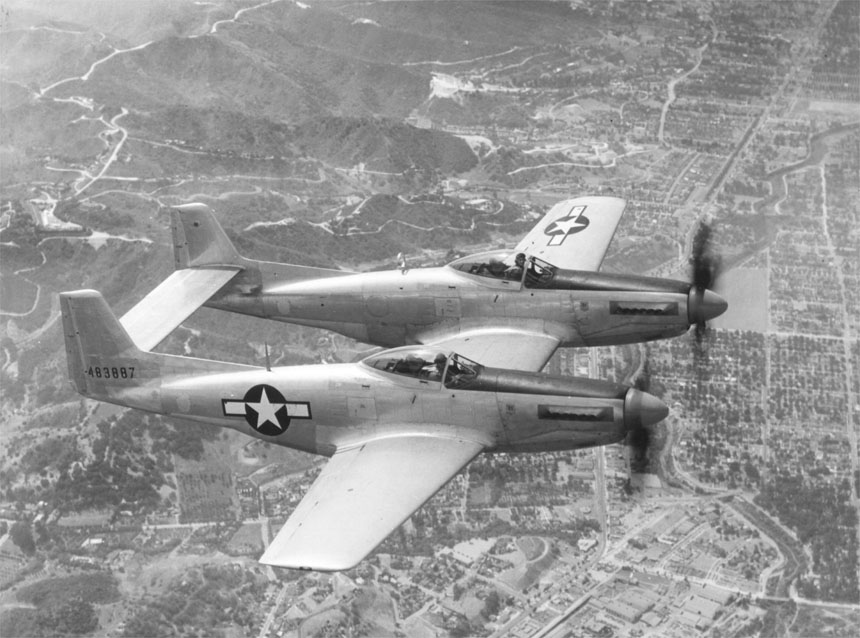
The second prototype North American XP-82 Twin Mustang being flight-tested at Muroc Army Airfield, California

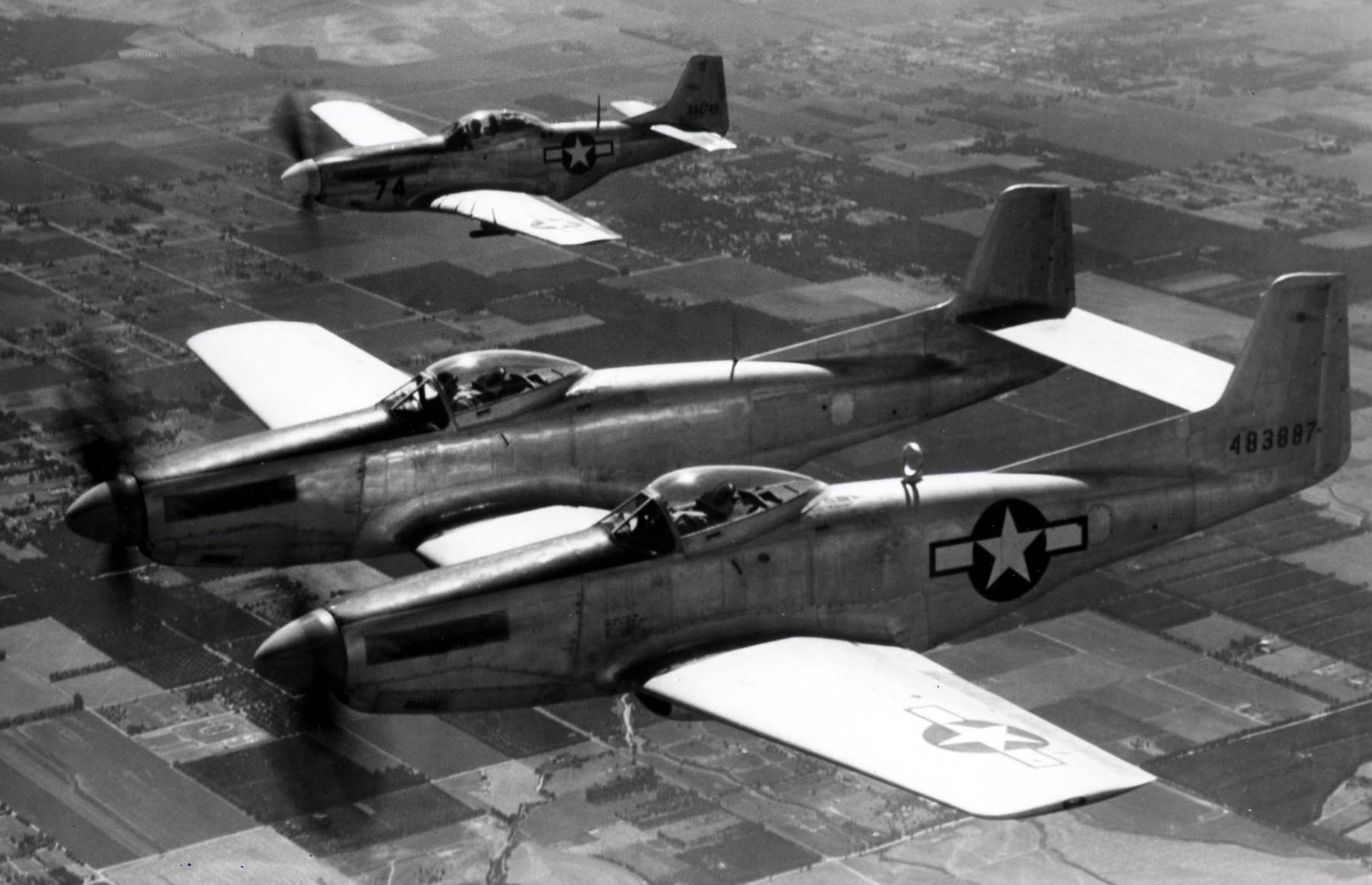
F-82 and P-51 in formation

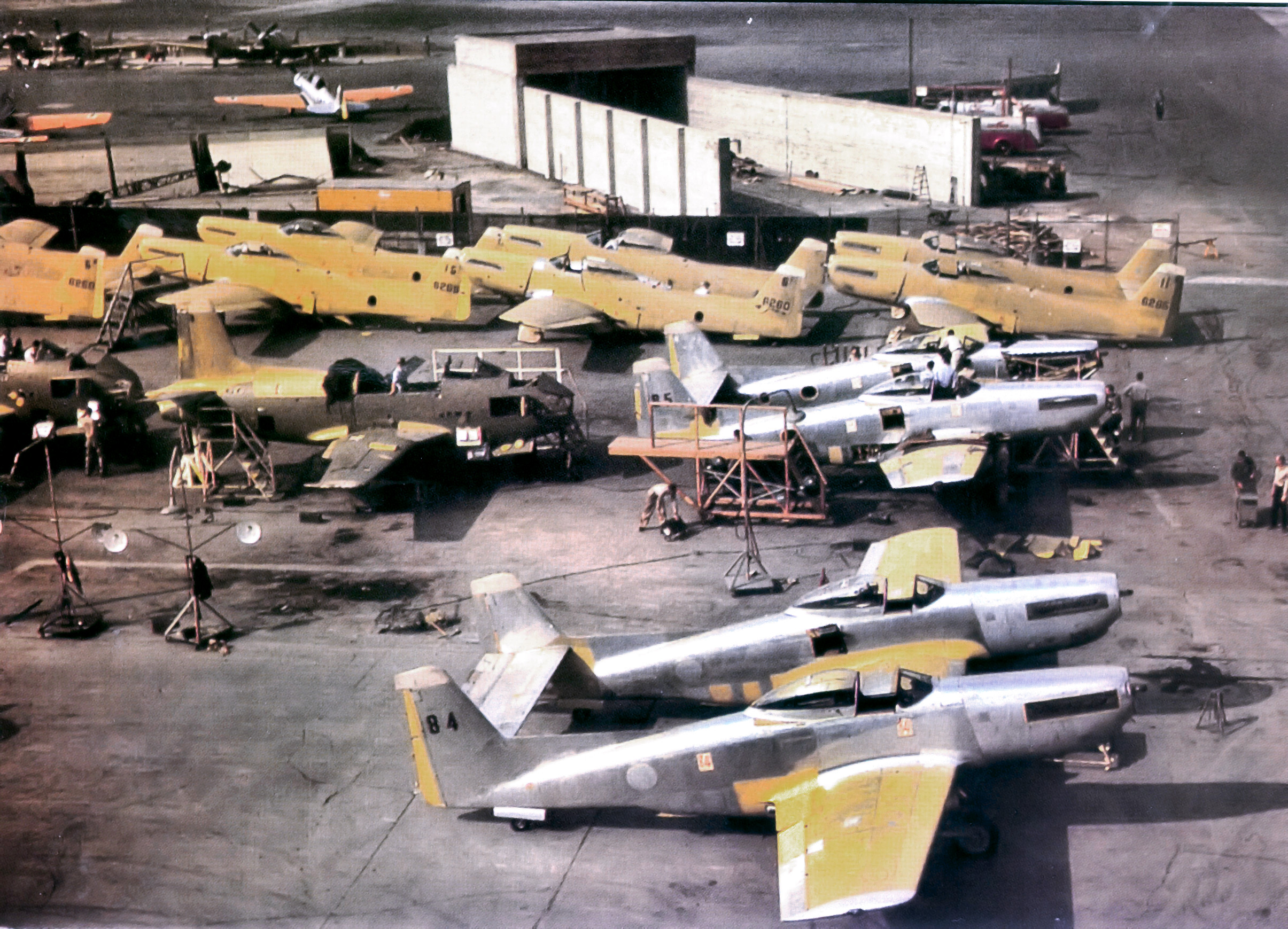
Twin Mustangs and two jet-engined FJ-1 Furys in production at North American, 1948

Early work centred around two different proposals, one being a more conventional twin-engine single-seat fighter while the second proposition was more unconventional, comprising a pair of fuselages that each housed a pilot and were attached to one another via a central wing. The latter was favoured and became the Twin Mustang. In spite of this name implying that the aircraft was derived from the P-51 Mustang, or that it was formed from two Mustangs having been fixed together, it was actually a largely clean-sheet design; the name was instead intended to be a reference to the increased range and payload capacity of the aircraft. Only 20 percent of the Twin Mustang’s components were interchangeable with the Mustang. In February 1944, North American presented their design proposal, which immediately received the support of multiple USAAF officials; that same month, the company received an instruction to build three XP-82 prototypes along with an initial production order for 500 aircraft.

In terms of its design configuration, the Twin Mustang comprised a pair of fuselages that were joined together via a center wing section. The landing gear was of conventional type; the main wheels retracted into the fuselage center sections. The aircraft was provisioned with various armaments, including a total of six .50 caliber (12.7mm) M3 Browning machine guns were mounted on the centre wing section. The prototype XP-82 carried an eight-gun pod beneath the aircraft's centre wing; this position could be used to accommodate bombs, radar, an external fuel tank, or weather observation apparatus. An alternative gun pod that was fitted with a 40 mm (1.6 in) cannon was also proposed. The outer wings were fitted with four hardpoints, which were rated to carry up to 1,000 lb (450 kg) of ordnance each.

While possessing substantial range, the resulting aircraft was not particularly agile and thus considered to be ill-suited to dogfighting. The flight controls used on the models were particularly heavy and were unboosted, although later production aircraft did feature hydraulically-boosted controls (provisioned from three separate hydraulic systems) for the aileron, elevator, and rudder. It could maintain level flight on a single engine provided effective use of the rudder and the propeller of the idle engine was feathered.

The XP-82 prototypes, as well as production P-82Bs and P-82Es, retained both fully-equipped cockpits that permitted pilots to fly the aircraft from either position, alternating control during long flights and thereby enabling the aircraft to be safely continuously flown to the full extent of its lengthy endurance. However, the later night fighter versions of the aircraft opted to retain the cockpit on the left side only, having placed the radar operator in the right position. An internal heater was present, although this was typically operated only for anti-icing purposes during flight.

The maiden flight of the first prototype took place on 26 June 1945; two months later, the USAAF accepted delivery of this prototype, as well as two more prototypes by October of that year. However, by the time that the second prototype had been completed, the USAAF's need for long escort fighters had been resolved via the capture of several islands sufficiently close to the Japanese mainland. Accordingly, in December 1945, it was decided to scale back the production numbers from 500 aircraft to 270 aircraft. While several P-82B airframes were completed before the end of WW2, most of these remained at the North American factory in California waiting for engines until 1946. As a result, none saw service during the conflict; delivery of the first P-82Bs occurred during January 1946.

Like most versions of the P-51 Mustang, the first two prototype XP-82s as well as the next 20 P-82B models were powered by British-designed Rolls-Royce V-1650 Merlin engines, re-engineered for increased durability and mass-production, and built under license by Packard. These engines provided the fighter with excellent range and performance; however, officials within the USAAF sought to power the Twin Mustang using an indigenous and stronger engine than the foreign-designed P-51's V-1650. In addition, the licensing fees paid to Rolls-Royce for each V-1650 were being increased by Britain after the war. To this end, the service negotiated in August 1945 with the Allison Division of the General Motors Corporation for a new version of the Allison V-1710-100 engine. This measure compelled North American to switch subsequent production P-82C and later models to the lower-powered engines. It was found that Allison-powered P-82 models demonstrated a lower top speed and poorer high-altitude performance than the earlier Merlin-powered versions. The earlier P-82B models were designated as trainers, while the "C" and later models were employed as fighters, making the P-82 one of the few aircraft in U.S. military history to be faster in its trainer version than the fighter version.

While work had slowed on the P-82's development following the end of WW2, circumstances had changed by 1947. Increasing tensions between the rising superpowers of the era, the United States and the Soviet Union, which would cumulate in the lengthy Cold War, led to an increased prioritisation of numerous military programmes on both sides. While separate efforted proceeded towards developing a new generation of jet aircraft, full-rate production of the P-82 was authorised as a replacement for the wartime Northrop P-61 Black Widow as an all-weather night fighter to defend the American mainland against a potential attack by nuclear-armed Soviet bombers.

In 1948, the 3200th Proof Test Group at Eglin AFB, Florida, fitted the 4th F-82B Twin Mustang with retractable pylons under the outer wings capable of mounting ten High-Velocity Air Rockets (HVAR) each, which folded into the wing undersurface when not in use. This installation was not adopted on later models, the standard "tree" being used instead. The thirteenth aircraft was experimentally fitted with a center wing mounted pod housing an array of recon cameras, and was assigned to the 3200th Photo Test Squadron, being designated, unofficially, the RF-82B.

=== Record-setting ===
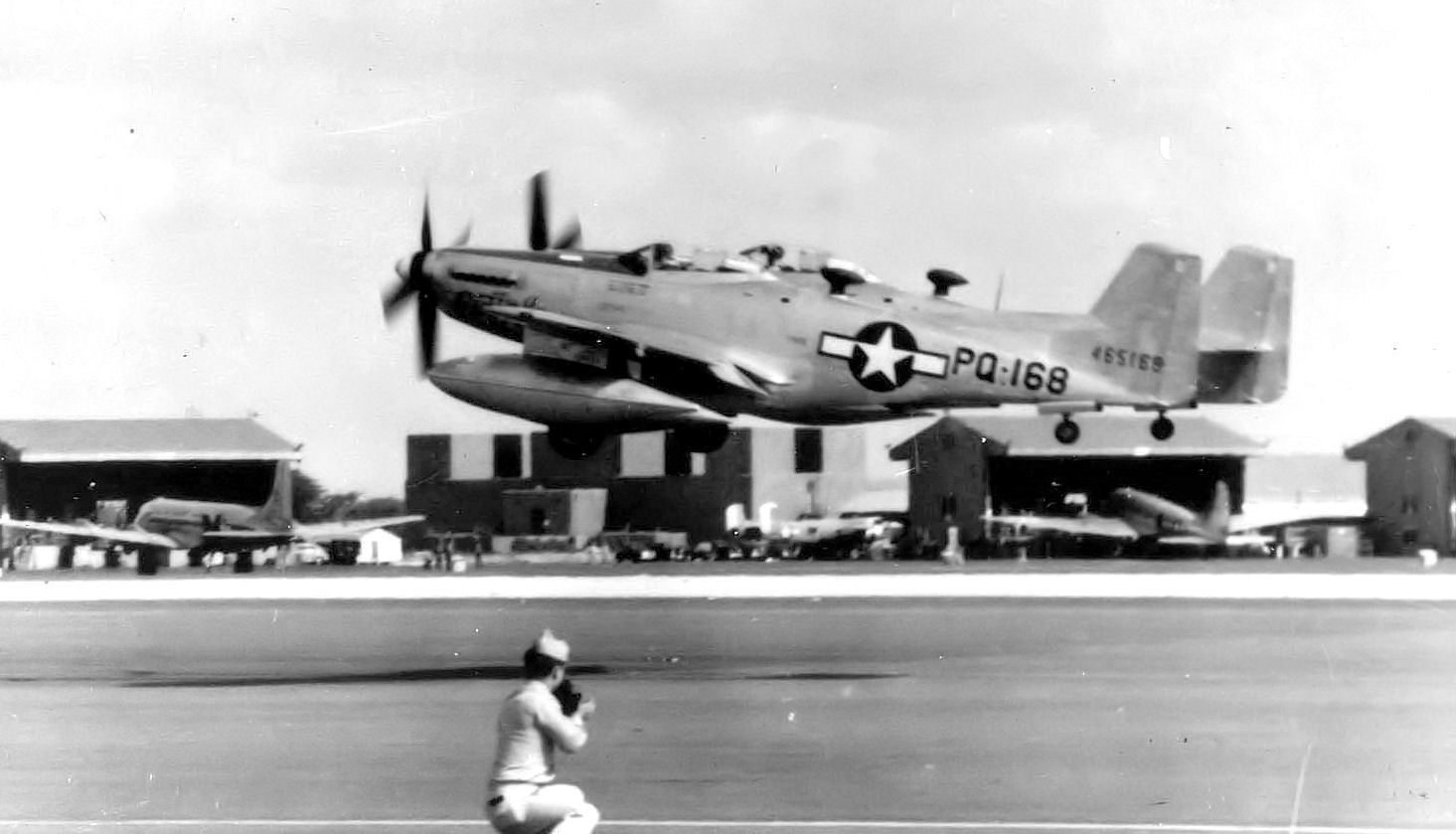
P-82B-NA "Betty Jo" taking off from Hickam Field, Hawaii, 27 February 1947

On 27 February 1947, P-82B, named Betty Jo and flown by Colonel Robert E. Thacker, made history when it flew non-stop from Hawaii to New York without refueling, a distance of 5,051 mi (8,129 km) in 14 hours and 32 minutes, during which the aircraft averaged 347.5 mph (559.2 km/h). During this flight, it carried a full internal fuel tank of 576 US gal (2,180 L; 480 imp gal), augmented by four 310 US gal (1,200 L; 260 imp gal) tanks for a total of 1,816 US gal (6,870 L; 1,512 imp gal). Colonel Thacker did not drop three external tanks when their fuel was expended, either because of an oversight, or because they were stuck due to a mechanical glitch. This remains the longest nonstop flight ever made by a propeller-driven fighter, and the fastest time in which such a distance has ever been covered in a piston-engine aircraft. The aircraft chosen was an earlier "B" model powered by Rolls-Royce Merlin engines (see "Surviving aircraft" below).

== Operational history ==
The Twin Mustang was developed at the end of the prop-driven fighter era and at the dawn of the jet age. Its designed role as a long-range fighter escort was eliminated by the end of World War II. With the rapid draw-down of the armed forces after the conflict, the newly established USAF had little money for new propeller-driven aircraft, especially since jet aircraft, such as the Messerschmitt Me 262, had proved to be faster than the P-51 Mustang over the skies of Germany in late 1944. The completed airframes (minus engines) of the P-82 pre-production aircraft already manufactured went into storage, with an uncertain future.

Early attempts to develop jet-powered all-weather fighters ran into a series of delays. The Curtiss-Wright XF-87 Blackhawk was ordered in December 1945, but it ran into development difficulties and the project was abandoned in October 1948. The Northrop P-89 Scorpion had greater promise, but it too had teething troubles and was not expected to enter service until 1952 at the earliest. Due to the lack of a suitable jet-powered replacement, the wartime Northrop P-61 Black Widow night fighter was forced into this role, and in order to fill in the gap until the Scorpion became available, night fighter adaptations of the Twin Mustang were developed and deployed.

On 11 June 1948, the newly formed United States Air Force (USAF) replaced the P-for-pursuit category with F-for-fighter. Accordingly, the P-82 was re-designated F-82.

=== Strategic Air Command ===
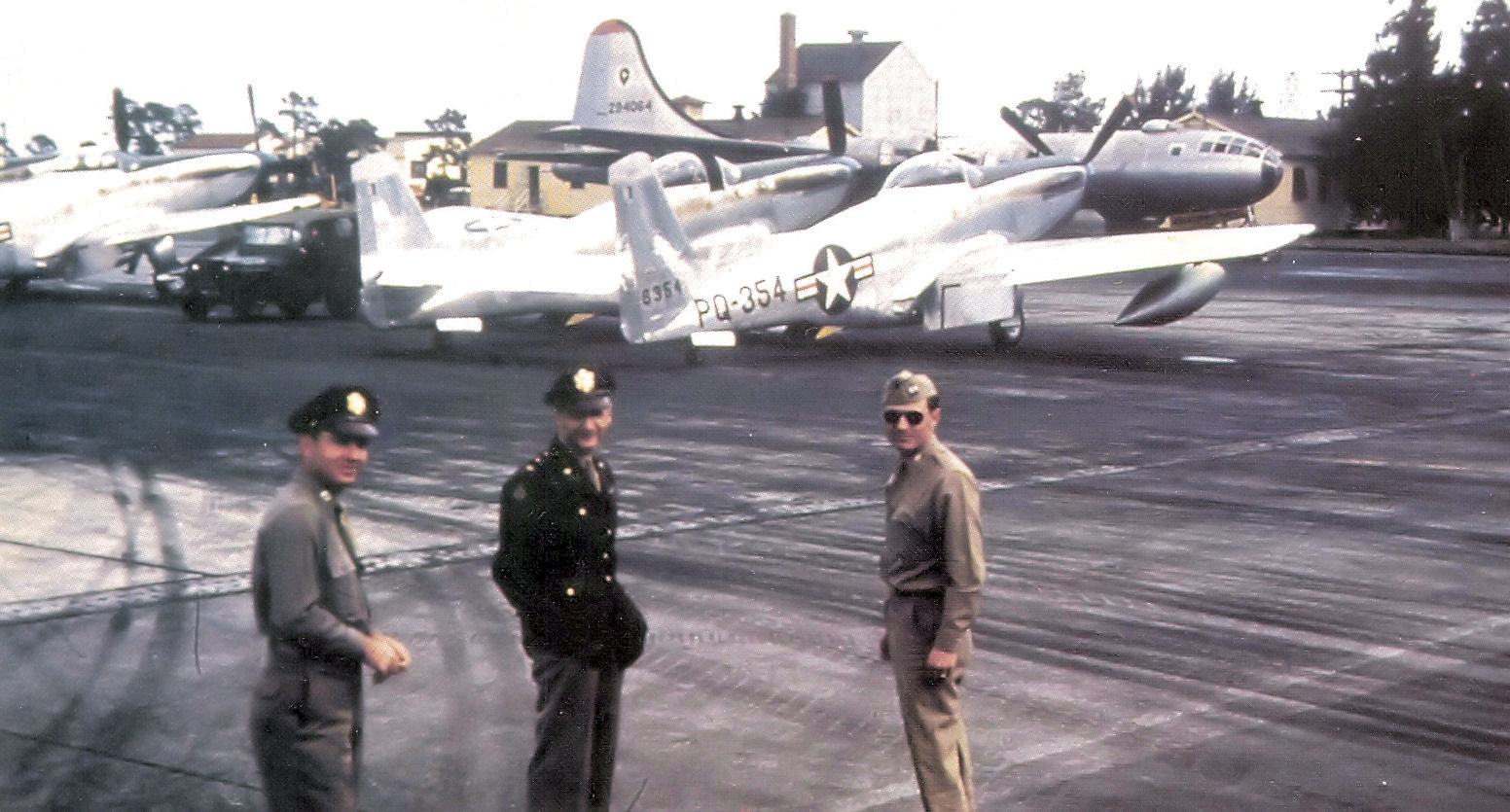
27th FW North American F-82E Twin Mustangs along with a Boeing B-29 Superfortress at Kearney Air Force Base, Nebraska.

The F-82E was the first operational model and its initial operational assignment was to the Strategic Air Command 27th Fighter (later Fighter-Escort) Wing at Kearney Air Force Base, Nebraska in May 1948. During World War II, the P-51 Mustang had escorted Boeing B-17 Flying Fortress and Consolidated B-24 Liberator bombers from bases in England and Southern Italy to targets in Nazi-occupied Europe. However, the Cold War brought on the challenge of B-29, Boeing B-50 or Convair B-36 missions into the Soviet Union. The size of the Soviet Union dictated long bombing missions there and back from bases in Europe or Alaska, most of it over Soviet territory. Also the weather, which was bad enough in Western Europe, would make bombing missions exceptionally difficult between October and May. With no long-range jet fighters to escort the strategic bomber force, the 27th FEW was to fly these missions in F-82Es.

The F-82E had a range of over 1,400 mi (2,300 km), which meant that with external fuel tanks it could fly from London to Moscow, loiter for 30 minutes over the target, and return, the only American fighter which could do so. It also had an operational ceiling of 40,000 ft (12,000 m), where it could stay close to the bombers it was designed to protect. The first production F-82Es reached the 27th in early 1948, and almost immediately the group was deployed to McChord AFB, Washington, in June, where its squadrons stood on alert on a secondary air defense mission due to heightened tensions over the Berlin Airlift. It was also believed that the 27th would launch an escort mission, presumably to the Soviet Union, if conflict broke out in Europe. From McChord, the group flew its Twin Mustangs on weather reconnaissance missions over the northwest Pacific, but problems were encountered with their fuel tanks. Decommissioned F-61 Black Widow external tanks were found at Hamilton AFB, California, which could be modified for the F-82; fitted on the pylons of the Twin Mustang, these solved the problem. With a reduction in tension, the 27th returned to its home base in Nebraska during September.

Four F-82s were deployed from McChord to Alaska, where the pilots provided transition training to the 449th Fighter (All Weather) Squadron, which used Twin Mustangs in the air defense mission. They remained in Alaska for about 45 days, returning to rejoin the rest of the group at the beginning of November 1948.

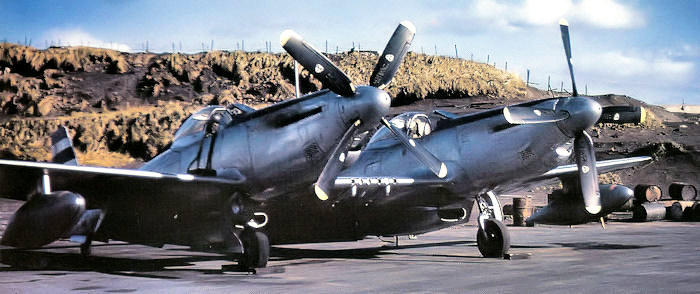
One of four 27th Fighter Escort Wing F-82Es deployed to Davis AFB, Aleutians in December 1948 for the transition of the 449th Fighter (All-Weather) Squadron from P-61 Black Widows to the Twin Mustang.

In January 1949, the Eighth Air Force planned a large celebration at Carswell Air Force Base. All of its assigned units were to participate in a coordinated flyover. Most of the Strategic Air Command's bombers were to participate, along with its only "Long Range" fighter group, the 27th. The weather in Nebraska was horrible, with most airports in the Midwest forced to close on the day of the display. Kearney Air Force Base was hit with a blizzard, and paths were cut through the snow allowing the F-82s to take off and rendezvous with the bombers. This was seen as proof of the F-82's capabilities in bad weather.

In early 1949, the 27th began carrying out long-range escort profile missions. Flights to Puerto Rico, Mexico, the Bahamas and nonstop to Washington, D.C. were carried out. For President Truman's 1949 inauguration, the 27th FEW launched 48 aircraft to fly in review, along with several other fighter units, in formation down Pennsylvania Avenue. Another flyover of the newly dedicated Idlewild Airport in New York City soon followed, with the aircraft flying non-stop from Kearney AFB.

In March 1949, Kearney AFB was closed and the 27th FEW was reassigned to Bergstrom Air Force Base, Texas. Other long-range missions were flown cross-country, including simulated dogfights with Lockheed F-80 Shooting Stars. The 27th FEW began transitioning to the Republic F-84 Thunderjet in March 1950, and the F-82Es were largely surplus, with the last examples being phased out by September. A few were sent to Far East Air Forces for combat in Korea and some were sent to Alaska for bomber escort missions over the Arctic from Ladd AFB until 1953. The majority went to reclamation and were gone by 1952.

With the appearance of the Mikoyan-Gurevich MiG-15 over North Korea in late 1950, the B-29, as well as all of the propeller-driven bombers in the USAF inventory, were rendered obsolete as strategic offensive weapons. The straight-winged F-84Gs were ineffective against the MiG, and it took the swept-wing North American F-86 Sabre to counter them. It would take a new generation of swept-wing jet bombers, able to fly higher and faster, to survive the MiG-15 and subsequent Soviet interceptors. The era of large formations of bombers flying to a strategic target ended after the Korean War. Strategic bombing became a one-plane, one target mission, with the jet-powered Boeing B-52 Stratofortress flying higher and faster than most enemy interceptors. The escort fighter became redundant, and by 1957 SAC had inactivated the last of its strategic fighter escort wings.

=== Air Defense Command ===
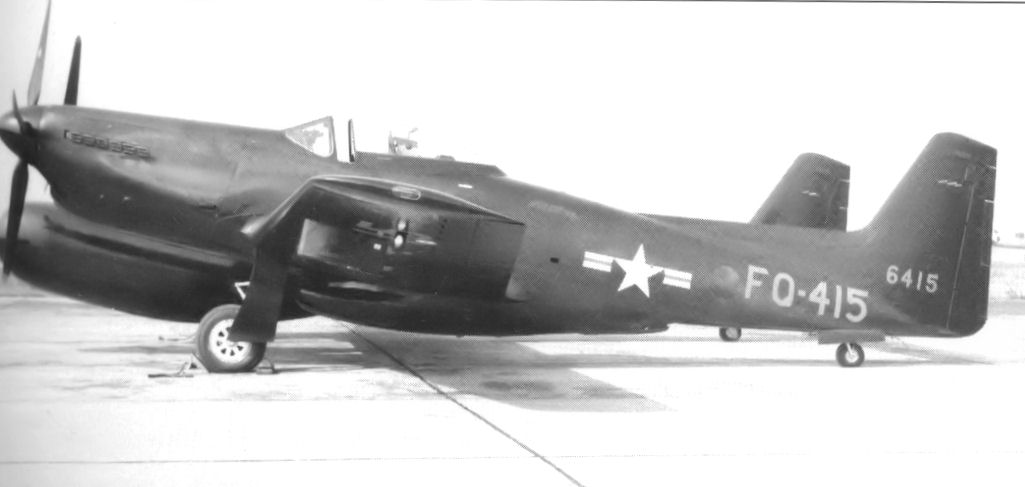
317th Fighter-All Weather Squadron North American F-82F Twin Mustang, the first F-82F Twin Mustang delivered to Air Defense Command.

The appearance of the Soviet Tupolev Tu-4 in 1947 posed a new threat to post-war USAAC planners, and following the start of the Cold War in 1948, officials chose to establish the Air Defense Command (ADC) in the USAF.

In 1947, the embryonic ADC was not particularly effective. During a number of simulated raids on the United States carried out by Strategic Air Command during the period 1947–1949, defending F-51 Mustangs and F-47 Thunderbolts repeatedly failed to find the incoming bombers, and were seldom in a position to shoot them down. Furthermore, when they did so, the bombers had already made their runs over intended targets.

The radar-equipped wartime Northrop P-61 Black Widow night fighter was found to be effective in locating and attacking the incoming SAC bombers, and also had the range to attack the bombers far from their intended targets. With no suitable jet interceptors, the P-61 transitioned to the ADC interceptor mission. Available F-61s were war-weary and night fighter F-82C/D models were modified into all-weather interceptors to replace them.

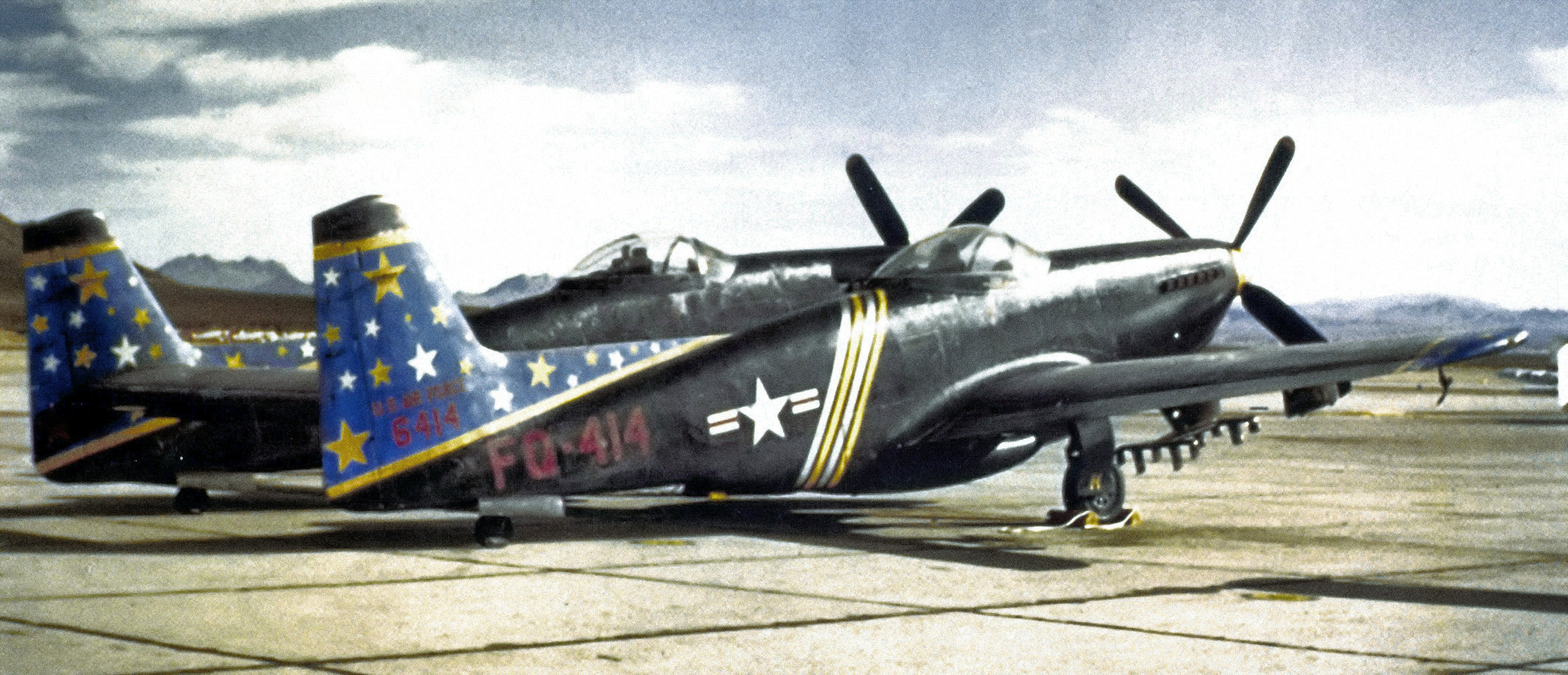
Group Commander's F-82F Twin Mustang of the 52d Fighter Group (All Weather) at the 1950 World Wide gunnery meet, Nellis AFB, Nevada in March 1950.

The production interceptor versions of the Twin Mustang were designated the F-82F and F-82G; the distinguishing feature between the F and G models was largely the nacelle beneath the center-wing that housed radar equipment (F-82F's AN/APG-28 and F-82G's SCR-720C18). In addition, the interceptor required numerous modifications. The right side cockpit was replaced with a radar operator's position without flight controls. A long radar pod, resembling a sausage and irreverently known as a "long dong", was attached to the underside of the wing center section, below the six .50 cal (12.7mm) machine guns and with its dish in front of the propellers to prevent interference. This unconventional arrangement did not affect the aircraft's performance seriously. Additionally the unit could be jettisoned in an emergency or for belly landings, and was sometimes even lost during high-G maneuvers. F-82F models were designated for ADC units in the United States, while the F-82G models were deployed to Far East Air Forces for air defense of Japan and Okinawa. The F-82 was never deployed to Europe.

The first F-82Fs began reaching ADC squadrons in September 1948. By the end of September, ADC had 29 F-82Fs. By the middle of 1949 the F-82 was replacing Black Widows in service with Air Defense Command along the west coast at Hamilton AFB, California (317th FIS) and McChord AFB, Washington (318th FIS, 319th FIS). East coast defense was the mission of the Twin Mustangs assigned to McGuire AFB, New Jersey (2d FIS, 5th FIS).

In addition to the forces in the Continental United States, the Caribbean Air Command 319th FIS at France Field in the Panama Canal Zone received 15 F-82Fs in December 1948 to replace Black Widows for defending the Panama Canal but remained there only briefly before being reassigned to McChord AFB in May 1949.

The Twin Mustang was replaced in ADC service during 1950–1951 by the Lockheed F-94 Starfire, the last being with the 318th FIS at McChord AFB in late 1951. Some went to Alaska, where they were modified into F-82H, while most airframe were simply scrapped.

=== Far East Air Forces ===
Farewell from family as 68th All-Weather Fighter Interceptor Squadron at Itazuke AB Japan leave for a combat mission over Korea.

After World War II, the Northrop P-61 Black Widow was the Far East Air Forces (FEAF) main interceptor. However, a lack of spare parts and maintenance issues made it difficult to keep the war-weary aircraft in the air. Until an all-weather jet interceptor became available, the F-82G Twin Mustang was seen as the interim solution. The last operational P-61s were sent by the 68th and 339th Fighter (All Weather) Squadrons to the reclamation yard at Tachikawa Air Base in February 1950, with Twin Mustangs arriving as replacement aircraft.

In Far East Air Forces, there were three squadrons operating the Twin Mustang, consisting of 45 aircraft. The 4th Fighter (All Weather) Squadron was attached to the 51st Fighter-Interceptor Wing at Naha Air Base, Okinawa, tasked with providing air defense within the Twentieth Air Force's area of responsibility during darkness and inclement weather. The 68th F(AW)S area would cover southern Japan from their base at Itazuke and the 8th Fighter Bomber Wing, with the 339th F(AW)S covering Tokyo and northern Japan from Johnson Air Base. FEAF had about 40 Twin Mustangs assigned to the command.

With the outbreak of the Korean War in June 1950, the F-82 was pressed into combat duty. On 25 June 1950, 68th Fighter Squadron F-82 aircrews on alert at Itazuke Air Base were told that North Korea had crossed the 38th Parallel. They were ordered to fly to the area and report any activity on the main roads and railroads. They arrived to find overcast conditions, with cloud tops at 8,000 ft (2,400 m). The Twin Mustangs flew through the clouds using radar and broke out at 2,000 ft (610 m), heading for Kimpo Airfield near Seoul. The pilots observed huge convoys of North Korean trucks and other vehicles, including 58 tanks, which had crossed into South Korea. The crews flew back through the clouds to Itazuke Air Base, where they were debriefed by a U.S. Army colonel from General Douglas MacArthur's staff. This reconnaissance flight is considered to be the first United States air combat mission of the Korean War.

With this information, along with other intelligence reports available to them, FEAF confirmed that the Korean People's Army had, indeed, launched a full-scale invasion of South Korea. FEAF's first priority, however, was to evacuate United States citizens. On the morning of 26 June, the nearby Norwegian freighter Reinholte was sent to Inchon harbor to evacuate non-military personnel from Seoul, which lay directly in the invasion route. A flight of Twin Mustangs from the 68th F(AW)S was dispatched to the area, arriving at dawn to provide air protection for the evacuation. Two of the F-82s were dispatched to fly over the road from Seoul, while others flew top cover over the Inchon docks. The patrol went without incident until about 1300, when a pair of Soviet-built aircraft (the exact aircraft type has never been determined) came out of the clouds. Orders given to the F-82 pilots prohibited any aggressive action; however, gun switches were activated when the enemy leader tightened up his turn and peeled off at the F-82s with his wing man in close tail. The F-82s dropped their external tanks, turned on combat power and started a climbing turn towards the North Korean aircraft. For some reason, the North Korean leader fired while too far away, with his bullets falling short of the F-82s which then pulled up into the clouds and above the overcast, putting them in a position to return fire if the North Koreans followed them. However, they did not, and no further contact was made for the rest of the day. The evacuation at Inchon was successfully carried out with a total of 682 civilians being transported to Sasebo, Japan.

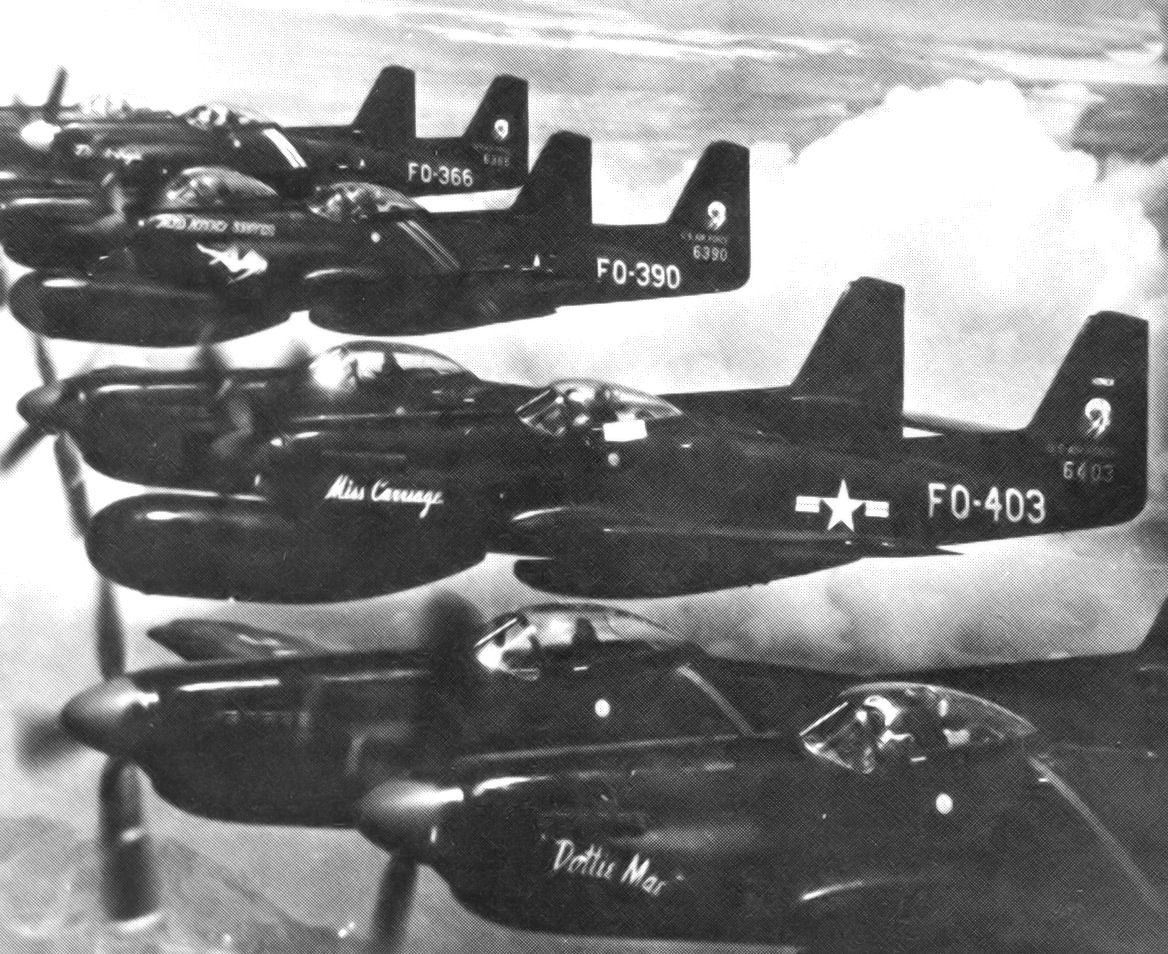
Flight of 339th FS F-82Gs heading to Korea in June 1950.

Once the bulk of U.S. civilians had been evacuated out of South Korea by ship, the priority of FEAF changed to a military nature. The 339th F(AW)S received orders from Fifth Air Force to move all available aircraft, along with crews and equipment, to Itazuke Air Base to assist the 68th in providing air cover for the evacuation of Seoul. However, the 339th's complement of aircraft were scattered over several bases at the time. Seven F-82s at Yokota AB were flyable and two were in the hangar undergoing maintenance for major repairs. Four other F-82s were at Misawa AB on TDY. The three at Yokota were dispatched immediately to Itazuke, as well as the four at Misawa, making a total of seven combat ready F-82Gs present for duty on 27 June. The 68th F(AW)S had a total of twelve operational F-82Gs. This, combined with what the 339th could contribute, was insufficient to meet the combat needs thrust upon FEAF. The F-80 Shooting Star was available, but its thirsty jet engine meant it could only remain over the airfield for a few minutes before having to return to base and it could not reach the forward combat area from Japan. No USAF P-51 Mustangs were available. FEAF ordered Twentieth Air Force to send eight F-82s from its 4th F(AW)S from Okinawa to Itazuke, making a total of 27 F-82s available for combat duty. This was commendable, considering that on 31 May 1950, a total of 32 F-82s existed within FEAF. With these combined squadrons, the 347th Provisional Fighter Group (AW) was formed.

Before dawn on 27 June, the 347th Provisional Group was up in the air over Korea, with a mission to provide cover for the Douglas C-54 Skymaster transports flying in and out of Kimpo Airfield as they moved the last civilians out. Fearing that the North Korean Air Force might try to shoot down the transport (a C-54 had been destroyed on the ground at Kimpo by North Korean fighters on 15 June), the Air Force requested air cover to protect the aircraft during takeoff. Fortunately, 339th Fighter All Weather Squadron (F(AW)S) with their F-82Gs were based at Yokota AB and the 68th F(AW)S was based at Itazuke AB Japan. With Lieutenant Colonel John F. Sharp in command, 27 F-82Gs of the 35 in Japan answered the call. Arriving in the early morning, they orbited Kimpo Airfield in three flights, each above the other. Suddenly, at 1150 hours, a mixed group of five North Korean fighters (Soviet-built Yak-9s, Yak-11s and La-7s) appeared, heading for the airfield. One of the Yak-11s immediately scored several hits on 68th F(AW)S pilot Lt. Charles Moran's vertical stabilizer. Moments later, Lt. William G. "Skeeter" Hudson, also of the 68th F(AW)S, initiated a high-G turn to engage the Yak, and soon was closing in on the Yak's tail. He then fired a short burst at close range, scoring hits with his six .50 inch machine guns. The Yak banked hard to the right, with the F-82G in close pursuit. A second burst hit the Yak's right wing, setting the gas tank on fire and knocking off the right flap and aileron. The North Korean pilot bailed out, but his observer, who was either dead or badly wounded, remained in the doomed aircraft. Parachuting down to Kimpo Airfield, the North Korean pilot was immediately surrounded by South Korean soldiers. Surprisingly, he pulled out a pistol and began firing at them. The South Korean soldiers returned fire, killing him. Moments later, Lt. Moran shot down an La-7 over the airfield, while a few miles away, Major James W. Little, commanding officer of the 339th F(AW)S, shot down another La-7. The C-54 was able to escape safely. Three of the five North Korean aircraft had been shot down, with pilot Lt. William G. "Skeeter" Hudson and radar operator Lt. Carl Fraiser scoring the first United States aerial "kill" of the Korean War.

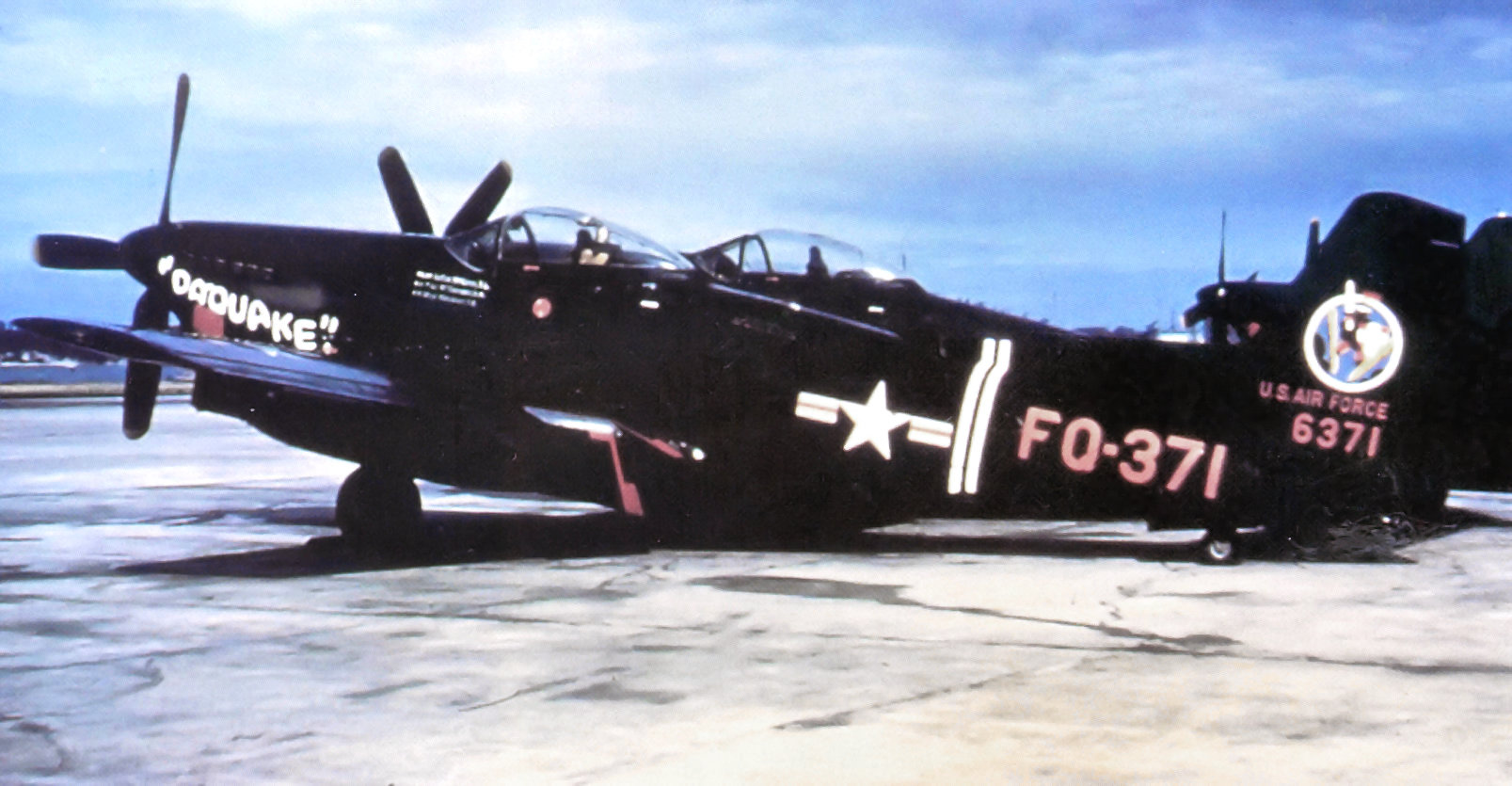
68th FS F-82G at Itazuke AB.

In the following weeks, the F-82 pilots would exceed all expectations in aerial combat. On 28 June, orders came down for all F-82s to be used in heavy ground support against any North Korean activity found between the front lines and the 38th Parallel. Every F-82 which could be made ready for flight was pressed into combat service. Although Fifth Air Force needed every available aircraft to slow down the North Korean invasion force, it was hard to justify the release of all F-82s from their defensive responsibilities for the many key bases in Japan. It was decided to release all F-82s for combat except for a flight which was deployed from the 4th F(AW)S in Okinawa to Japan and a full squadron of F-80s for air defense. On 30 June, FEAF requested HQ USAF for an additional 21 F-82 aircraft, which was denied. In addition, the projected level of support which could be provided at the level of combat usage FEAF was experiencing was no more than 60 days due to a shortage of parts. The fact was that, when F-82 production ended in April 1948, no provision had been made for an adequate supply of spare parts, as the aircraft was not expected to remain in operational service once jet-powered aircraft were available. Further, the Air Force simply did not have that many F-82s in the first place (182 total operational aircraft), and did not want to weaken the F-82 units committed to the Pacific Northwest or Atlantic coast, or to draw from the fourteen F-82Hs in Alaska.

This was a heavy blow to FEAF planners, as they wanted to use the F-82 for escorting B-26 Invaders deep into North Korea and for searching out ground targets along the Han River. Making do with what they had was the order of the day, and maintenance crews were cannibalizing everything in sight in order to keep the maximum number of F-82s airborne. During the period 26–30 June, the 68th squadron flew 35 combat sorties, averaging five hours per sortie, with the 339th flying similar numbers of missions.

During those early days, the stress and strain of combat put on the crews was intense. However, by early July the chances of F-82s engaging in air-to-air combat was significantly reduced, as the F-80 Shooting Stars had effectively stopped North Korea's air force from coming below the 38th parallel. The F-82s began flying strike and escort missions, along with night intruder sorties. Several F-82s took hits in their radar radomes, which were difficult to replace, and the radomes were removed, turning the aircraft into day fighters. In the ground support role, the F-82s could reach any part of the Korean battlefield with a total ordnance load of over 4,000 lb (1,800 kg). Each of the six .50-inch machine guns carried 400 rounds. This firepower was well-used against numerous ground targets. The escort missions flown with the B-26s took F-82s deep into North Korea. Flying with external fuel tanks, it was necessary on many occasions for the Twin Mustangs to drop tanks, owing to the risk of fire or explosion if enemy fire hit one of the empty tanks. On 10 July, F-82s from the 4th and 68th squadrons participated in one of the biggest strikes of the war against ground targets. Joined by B-26s and F-80s, the aircraft hit massive amounts of North Korean road traffic. An estimated 117 trucks, 38 tanks and seven personnel carriers were destroyed, along with a large number of enemy troops killed when the B-26s destroyed a bridge at Pyongtaek, causing a massive jam.

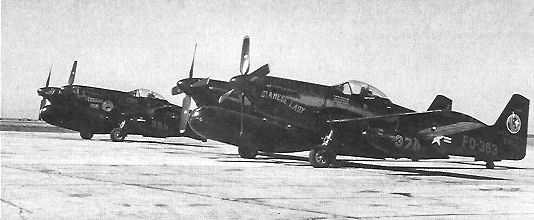
68th FS F-82Gs on the alert ramp at Kimpo AB, South Korea.

On 5 July, the 339th Squadron was pulled out of combat and returned to Johnson AB. Shortly afterwards, the 4th Squadron returned to Okinawa, with the 347th Provisional Group being inactivated and control of the 68th Squadron being turned over to the 8th Fighter Group. The 339th had been in combat a total of 10 days (26 June – 5 July), flying a total of 44 combat sorties for which they had been given no training. The 68th Squadron was left to carry on the battle. Throughout July and August 1950, F-82s from the 68th Squadron attacked enemy trains, vehicles, and numerous buildings, and constantly strafed North Korean troops on the roads. On the night of 27 August, an element of F-82s was patrolling over South Korea over a thick overcast when they received an urgent request for air support from some hard-pressed ground troops. Darkness was approaching when they reached the area and found UN ground troops pinned down by a concentration of mortars. The F-82 pilots made several passes to get set up with the ground controller, and as soon as the enemy target was pinpointed, the heavily armed aircraft commenced an attack that would last 45 minutes and use up all their ordnance. When the aircraft pulled up for the last time, the mortar positions were silent and ground forces later showed over 300 enemy dead.

Beginning in October 1950, F-82s would start flying weather reconnaissance pre-dawn missions over North Korea. At the same time, the squadron would also be responsible for keeping at least three aircraft on alert on airfields in the Seoul area (K-13 (Suwon) and K-14 (Kimpo)) during the hours of darkness and bad weather. This would become the main mission for the F-82s for the balance of 1950, as the F-51s, F-80s and F-84s took on most of the combat ground attack missions which the F-82s had been pressed into at the beginning of the war. With the entry of the Chinese Communist forces into the war, the situation on the ground began to deteriorate rapidly. By late December, the 68th had begun flying two-aircraft missions during daylight and single-aircraft missions at night from Kimpo AB. On 7 January, FEAF ordered the 68th to start flying armed reconnaissance missions to check roads over southern North Korea as UN forces were rapidly withdrawing south before the Chinese onslaught. This was a nightmare as the Chinese were pouring south, and it appeared that the situation was becoming as it had been the previous June. On 26 January, the armed reconnaissance missions were discontinued and the F-82s were placed on continuous combat air patrols over Kandong Airfield near Pyongyang and over both of Pyongyang's main airfields, (K-23, Pyongyang and K-24, Pyongyang East) to monitor enemy air activity. This was essential as any Chinese aircraft operating out of these bases would be in easy range of the UN front lines. The 68th's efforts claimed 35 trucks destroyed, with damage to many others.

As 1951 progressed, the F-82s of the 68th Squadron continued its mission of air defense over Seoul and flying weather reconnaissance flights; however, its combat duties became more and more limited. The end of the line was rapidly approaching for the F-82 in Korea. By the end of August 1951, there were only eight operational F-82s with the 68th, with its replacement, the Lockheed F-94 Starfire arriving in Japan, taking over missions previously flown by the Twin Mustangs. In March 1952, the Starfire-equipped 319th Fighter-Interceptor Squadron arrived from Moses Lake AFB, Washington and took up residence at K-13. On 28 March 1952, the last F-82G was sent for cold-weather modification, and then deployed to Alaska. By mid-April 1952, the F-82s in Okinawa were also sent to Japan for modification and were also sent to Alaska. All-weather responsibilities in FEAF were now in the hands of the F-94 and the jet era.

F-82G operational losses during the Korean War

- 46-357 (6160th ABW, 68th FAWS) MIA 28 May 1951, 20 mi (32 km) N of 38th parallel.
- 46-364 (6160th ABW, 68th FAWS) destroyed on ground at Suwon, Korea, 29 June 1950, by enemy aircraft.
- 46-373 (6160th ABW, 68th FAWS) crashed 5 mi (8.0 km) NW of Brady AB, Japan, 12 February 1951.
- 46-375 (6160th ABW, 68th FAWS) crashed 16 December 1950.
- 46-378 (6160th ABW, 68th FAWS) shot down by AAA 3 July 1951.
- 46-391 (51st FIG, 4th FAWS) in midair collision with F-80C 49-704 between Fukuoka and Ashiya AB, Japan, 29 September 1950.
- 46-394 (6160th ABW, 68th FAWS) MIA 14 March 1951.
- 46-399 (6160th ABW, 68th FAWS) MIA 27 January 1951.
- 46-400 (6160th ABW, 68th FAWS) crashed near K-14 7 December 1950.
- 46-402 (51st FIG, 68th FAWS) MIA 6 July. 1950.

1951 was the last full year of F-82 operations in Korea, as they were gradually replaced by the jet-powered F-94 Starfire. USAF claimed the Twin Mustangs destroyed 20 enemy aircraft, four in the air and 16 on the ground during the conflict.

During the Korean war, 22 F-82s were lost, including 11 in combat missions and 11 non-combat losses.

=== Alaskan Air Command ===
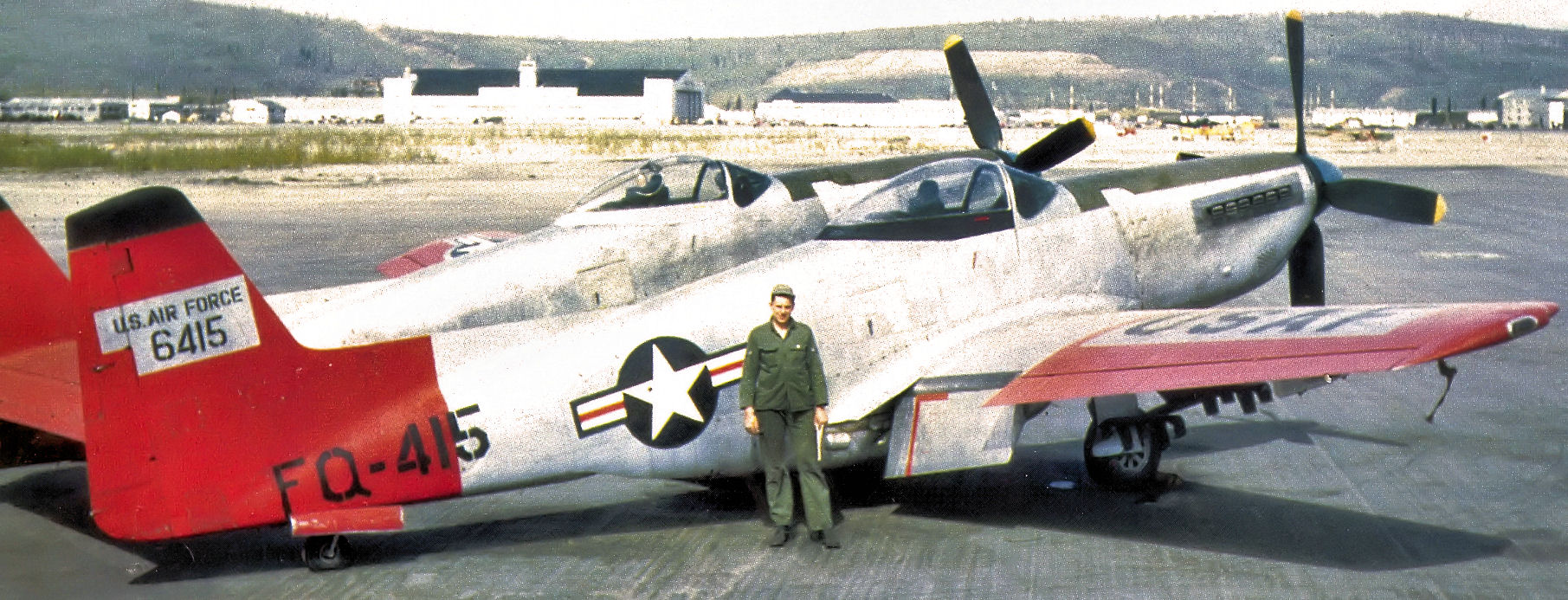
USAF operational F-82 Twin Mustang, F-82F on the ramp at Ladd AFB, just before going to salvage at Elmendorf AFB, May 1953.

Modified F-82F/Gs for cold weather were designated as F-82H. Six were assigned initially to the 449th F(AW)S at Adak Island in December 1948 to replace their P-61 Black Widows in the Alaska Air Defense mission. The Twin Mustang was well-suited for the air defense mission in Alaska due to its long-range flying ability. In March 1949, the squadron was reassigned to Ladd AFB, near Fairbanks, where an additional eight (14 total) arrived.

In Alaska, the squadron would patrol over wide areas of Alaska as the Soviets flying from airfields in Siberia would often test the air defenses. Beginning in August 1950, the 449th began receiving the F-94 Starfire jet interceptor, and the F-82s were assigned to a separate detachment within the squadron. With the outbreak of the Korean War, tensions were high in Alaska, as it was feared that it would become a "back door" to Soviet aircraft striking North America. The Soviets were repeatedly testing the Alaskan air defenses, with the F-94s responding when radar stations alerted them to incoming aircraft. Intercepts were rare, with only a few instances of eye-to-eye contact with Soviet aircraft. The slower F-82s had a longer range than the F-94s, and the Twin Mustangs constantly patrolled over many Alaskan villages and towns. Periodically, the F-82s were used for long-range visual reconnaissance near several known rough airstrips on the Chukchi Peninsula that the Soviets had used during World War II as landing fields for lend-lease aircraft and checking for any activity. In addition, flights around the Nome area and along the western Alaskan coastline were made. Squadron records show the Twin Mustangs were flown over some of the most remote areas of the Territory, along what today is known as the "North Slope" and over very rugged interior regions.

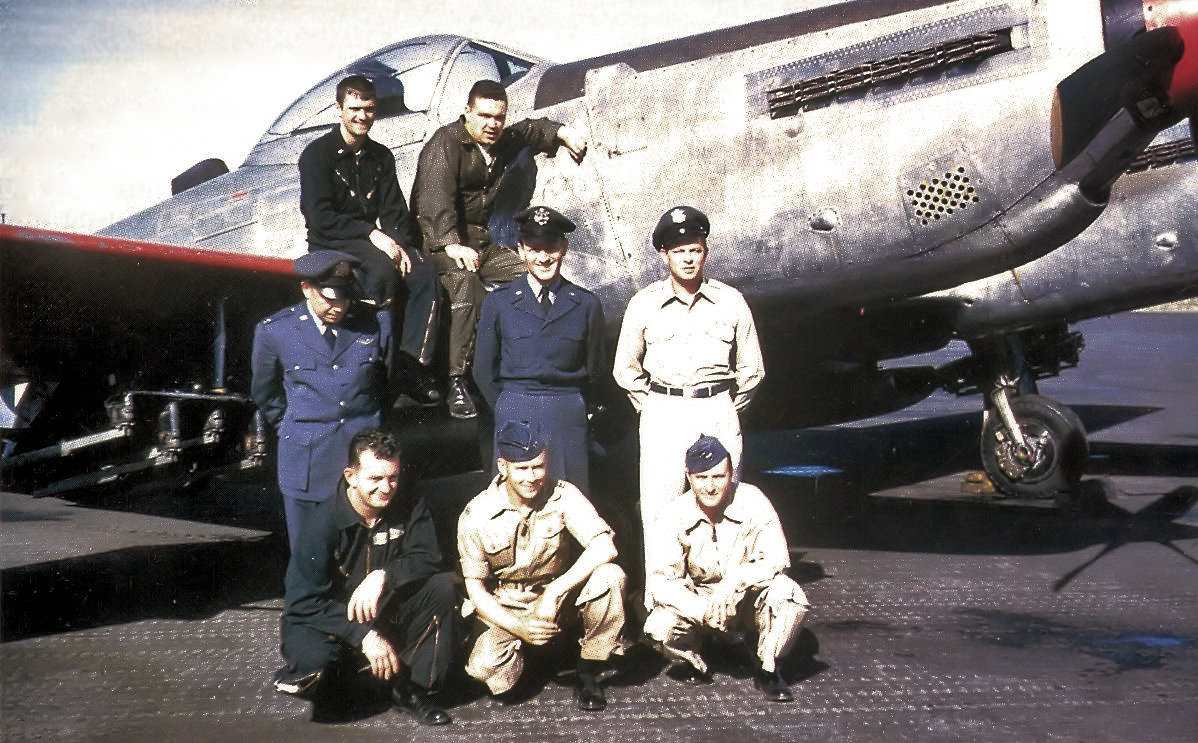
The final flight crew and maintenance support personnel of an F-82, May 1953.

The Twin Mustangs in Alaska operated further north than any other USAF aircraft at the time. In April 1952, they were flying escort duty for SAC B-36 Peacemaker bombers near Barter Island in the Beaufort Sea, near the most northerly tip of Alaska, about 1,000 mi (1,600 km) south of the North Pole. The F-82H made a brief but memorable appearance in the movie "Top of the World" (1955).

Another mission of the 449th was to act as a simulated invasion force during U.S. Army combat maneuvers during the summer months. Army ground units in Alaska were very limited in their movements due to the geography of the land. Most movements were up and down roads and paths and railroad rights-of-way. The F-82s would fly low along the terrain then pop up and initiate simulated strafing runs against them, causing the troops to take cover by hitting the muddy tundra. On occasions, the Twin Mustangs would also drop tear gas canisters, simulating gas attacks on the units.

The 449th would also assist the local government by bombing ice jams on the Tanana, Kuskokwim and Yukon Rivers. This helped avert disastrous floods in the region, by dropping 500 lb (230 kg) bombs and firing 5 in (127 mm) rockets at the ice, thus allowing the rivers to keep flowing and not get clogged up.

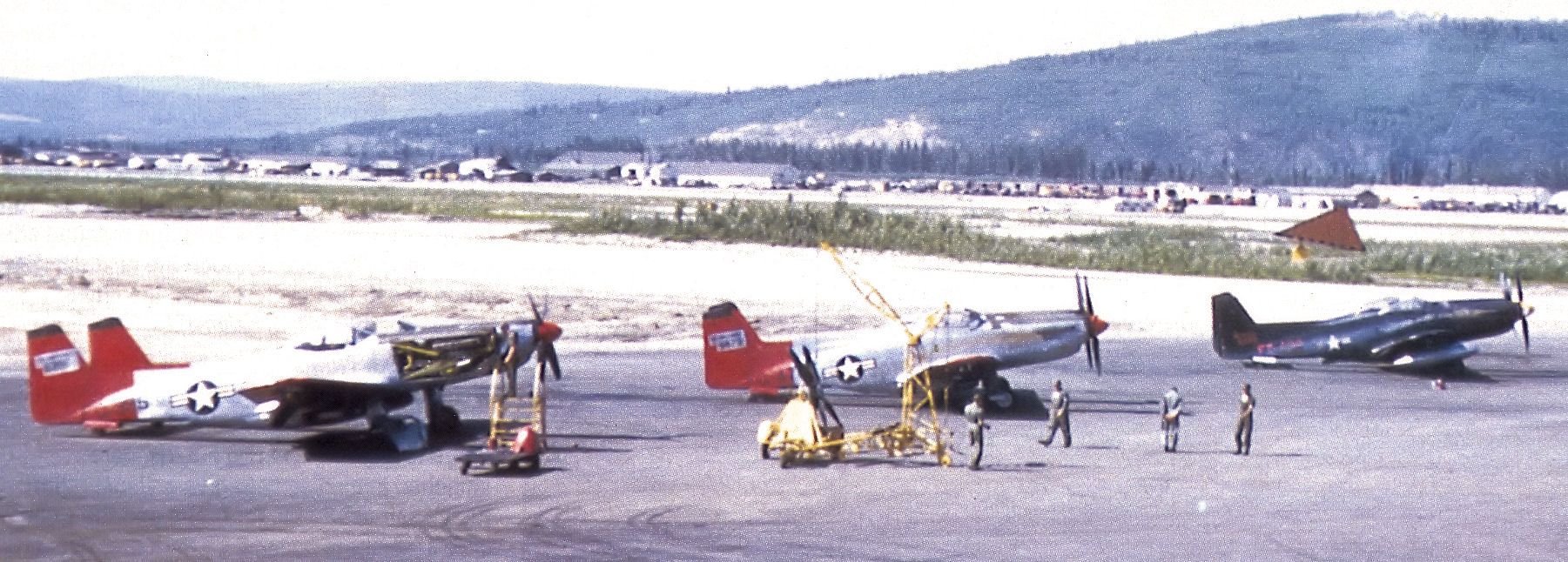
Two F-82Hs and one F-82G on the ramp at Ladd AFB, late summer 1952

Beginning in spring 1950, Strategic Air Command began replacing their F-82E bomber escorts and throughout the year, several were transferred to the 449th in Alaska. In February 1951, the Air Force ordered Alaskan Air Command that all the remaining F-82s in the Air Force inventory would all be transferred to Alaska. The Twin Mustangs would be used to support Army units in air-to-ground operations, and to use the F-94 Starfires for interceptor duty.

During 1951 and 1952, F-82Fs from the Air Defense Command 52d Fighter Group at McGuire AFB and 325th Fighter Group at McChord AFB were winterized and flown to Ladd AFB as replacements when those units transitioned to the F-94.

F-82Gs from Far East Air Force were also sent to Alaska, as jets took over combat duties over the skies of Korea. The FEAF F-82s, however, arrived in a badly corroded condition. Also, many of these aircraft which were sent to the 449th had high time on their airframes from long bomber escort and air defense flights, as well as the stress from combat duty in Korea causing many of them to be difficult to maintain. After four months at the 39th Air Depot Wing at Elmendorf, most were scrapped.

All in all, this provided AAC with a total of 36 various E, F, G and H model F-82s. By 1952, attrition had claimed many of the Twin Mustangs which were assigned to the squadron. The occasional long-range reconnaissance flight over the Bering Sea was still flown, given that the range of the Twin Mustang was much greater than that of the F-94. The right seat of the aircraft was usually occupied by an experienced flight mechanic. With the long patrol flights with high-hour aircraft, pilots began having more and more mechanical problems that forced them to land on crude flight strips. The mechanic usually could repair the aircraft well enough to get airborne and head straight back to Ladd AFB.

=== Retirement ===
The Twin Mustang had a very short operational life. About two years after its introduction to SAC, the F-82E was phased out of service in favor of the jet-powered Republic F-84E Thunderjet for bomber escort duties beginning in February 1950; the F-82Es were declared surplus by the end of the summer. Some were modified into F-82Gs and sent to Korea for combat as replacement aircraft, others were converted to F-82Hs and sent to Alaska, but most were sent to storage at Robins AFB, Georgia and ultimately reclamation.

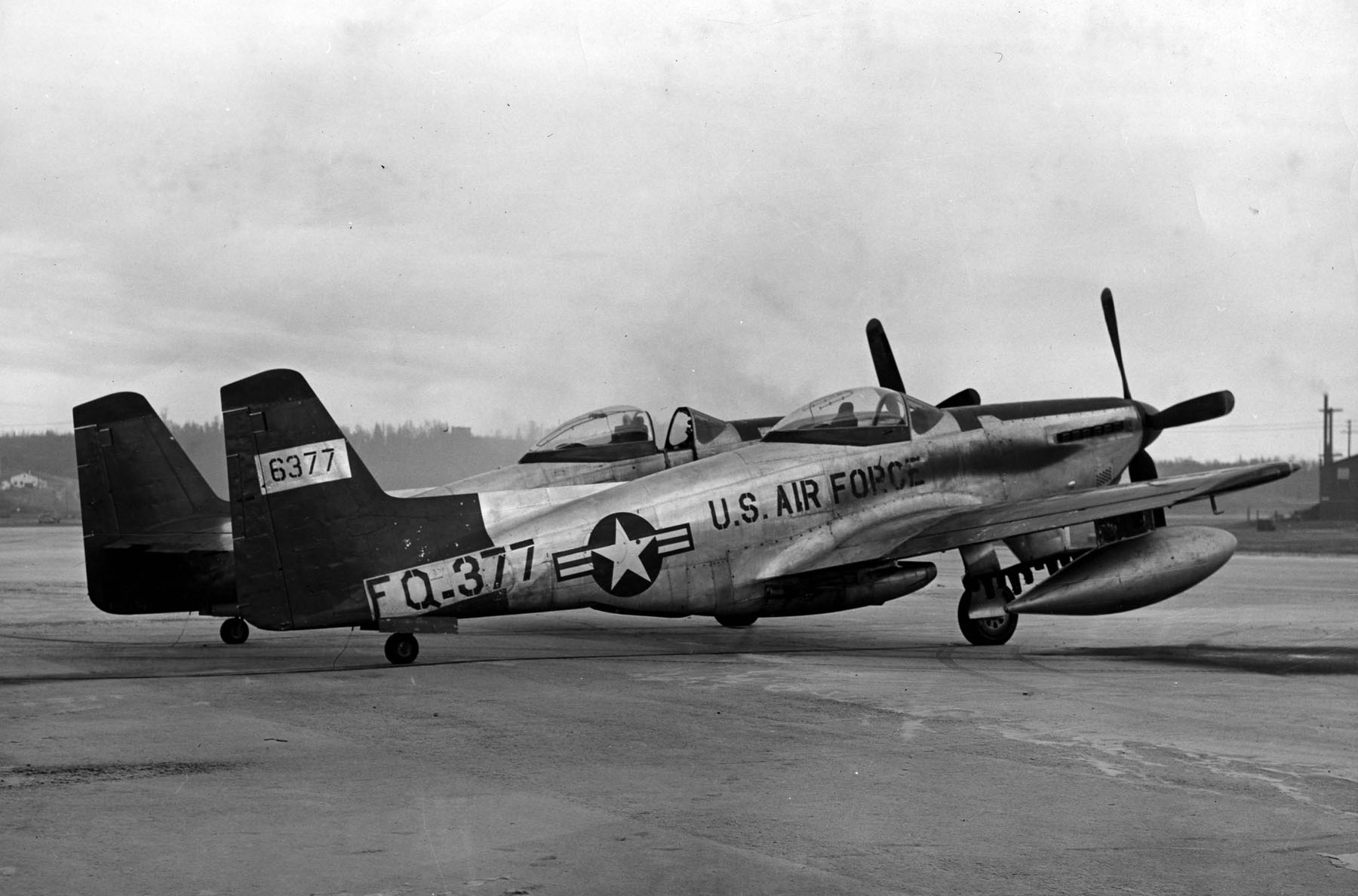
F-82H Twin Mustang at the end of the line, Elmendorf AFB, fall 1953

In the Pacific, the F-82Gs flown in combat over Korea were replaced by the Lockheed F-94A Starfire starting in April 1951 with the last being sent to the Tachikawa Air Depot in early 1952. There, they were either scrapped or sent to Alaska after being modified to the F-82H configuration in Japan for cold-weather use. Air Defense Command's F-82Fs began to be replaced by F-94As in June 1951, with most being declared excess by the end of the year and sent to storage and ultimately reclamation at McChord AFB, Washington, although a few Twin Mustangs remained in ADC service towing aerial targets.

In Alaska, attrition and a lack of spare parts led to the withdrawal of the F-82 from the USAF inventory. Initially, 16 of the 36 aircraft became hangar queens and were the main source for spare parts to keep the others operational. By the spring of 1953, the number of aircraft available had dwindled to a handful, with two or three operational aircraft kept flying by cannibalizing others which were incapable of being repaired. Each aircraft was flown about 48 hours per month until it was impossible to keep them in the air on a reliable basis.

Ultimately, all were withdrawn from service. The last remaining F-82Hs were sent to Elmendorf AFB, Alaska, for disposal in June 1953. The last Twin Mustang that remained in the operational inventory (46–377) was originally configured as an F-82G model that had served with two different squadrons in Okinawa and Japan. It was flown to Ladd AFB in 1952 and modified as a winterized F-82H. It was sent to Elmendorf AFB, being officially retired on 12 November 1953.

Some of the planes in storage at Robins and McChord were turned over to museums as static displays. Also after the end of their USAF service, the National Advisory Committee for Aeronautics (NACA) acquired four F-82s for research.

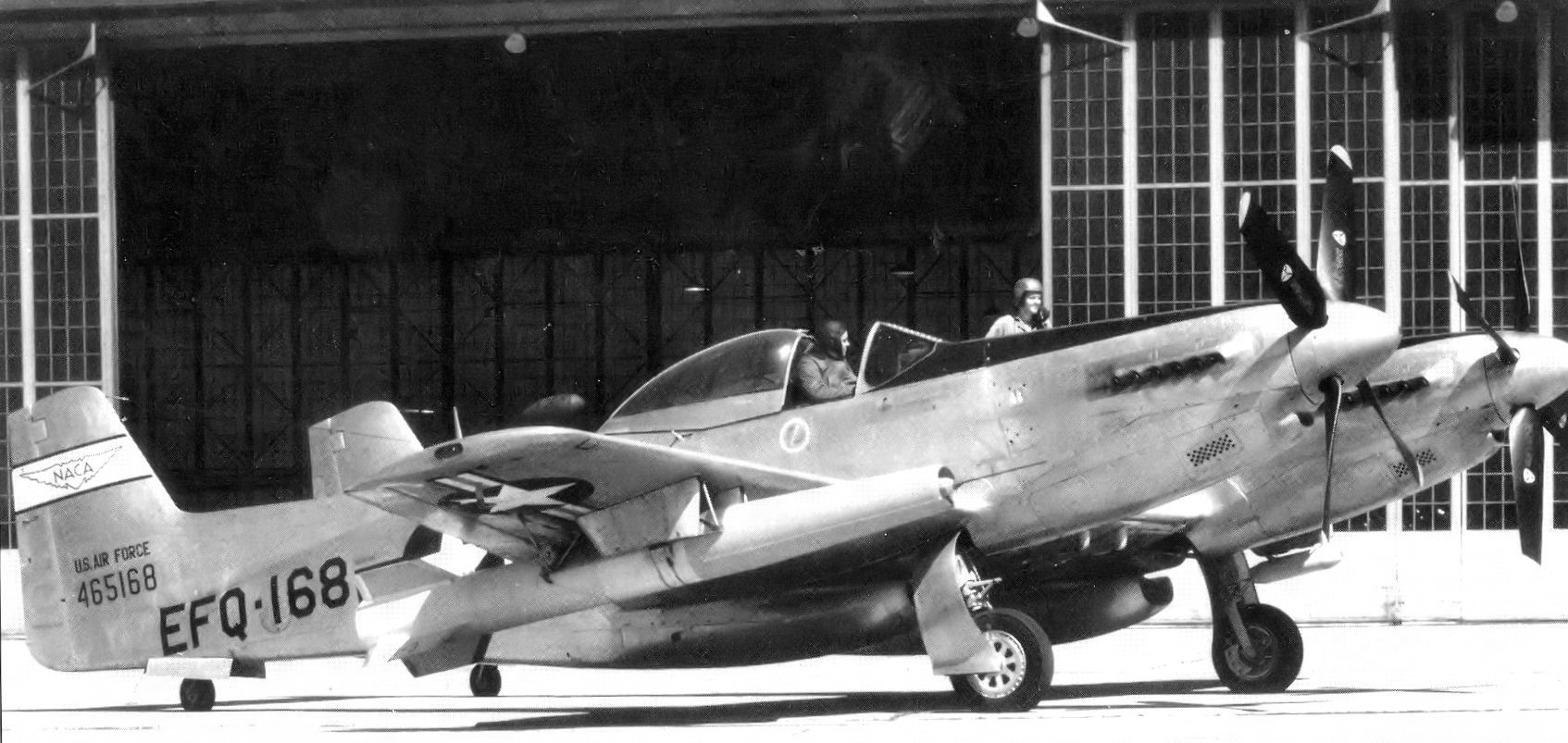
EF-82B "Betty Jo" with the NACA in 1952 with ramjet under the wing. When retired in 1957, this F-82 was the last flyable Twin Mustang under USAF ownership.

- XP-82-NA (NACA-14) Operated by NACA from 6 June 1948, to 5 October 1955. This aircraft was scrapped.
- XP-82-NA operated from October 1947 for ram jet tests until damaged in July 1950. Currently being restored in Douglas, Georgia.
- P-82B-NA (NACA-132) Operated from September 1950 to June 1957. This was the Betty Jo distance record aircraft and was used for ram jet tests. Was turned over to the USAF Museum.
- F-82E-NA (NACA-133) Used for high-altitude icing tests from January 1950, re-designated EF-82E. Sold for $1,600 in March 1954. Now being restored to flying condition in Anoka, Minnesota.

References for NACA F-82s:

== Variants ==
Production numbers
Variant	Produced	Conversions
XP-82	2	
XP-82A	1	
P-82B	20	
P-82C	0	1
P-82D	0	1
F-82E	100	
F-82F	100	
F-82G	50	9
F-82H	0	15
TOTAL	273	

NA-123
Basic Development design. The NA-123 design was presented by North American Aircraft to the USAAF in February 1944. The design for the new aircraft was for a long-range fighter to penetrate deep into enemy territory. Its immediate role would be to escort the B-29 Superfortress bombers used in the Pacific Theater of Operations against Japan. The USAAF endorsed it at once. A letter contract to construct and test four experimental XP-82 aircraft (P-82 designation) gave way in the same month to an order for 500 production models.
XP-82 / XP-82A
Prototype. The USAAF accepted the first XP-82 in August 1945 and a second one in September. Both were equipped with Packard Merlin V-1650-23 and −25 engines. The third experimental aircraft, designated XP-82A, had two Allison V-1710-119 engines. It was accepted in October 1945. There is no evidence that the XP-82A was ever actually flown, due to problems with the Allison engines. The fourth XP-82A prototype (44-83889) was canceled.
P-82B
Planned production version. With the end of World War II, production plans were cut back significantly. Against the 500 P-82Bs initially planned, overall procurement was finalized on 7 December 1945 at 270 P-82s. Included were 20 P-82Bs already on firm order and later allocated to testing as P-82Z. The USAAF accepted all P-82Zs in fiscal year 1947. Two aircraft were accepted in January 1946, four in February 1947, and 13 in March 1947. By December 1949, no P-82Bs (by then redesignated F-82Bs) remained in the Air Force inventory. These P-82Bs were basically similar to the XP-82, but differed in having provisions for underwing racks.

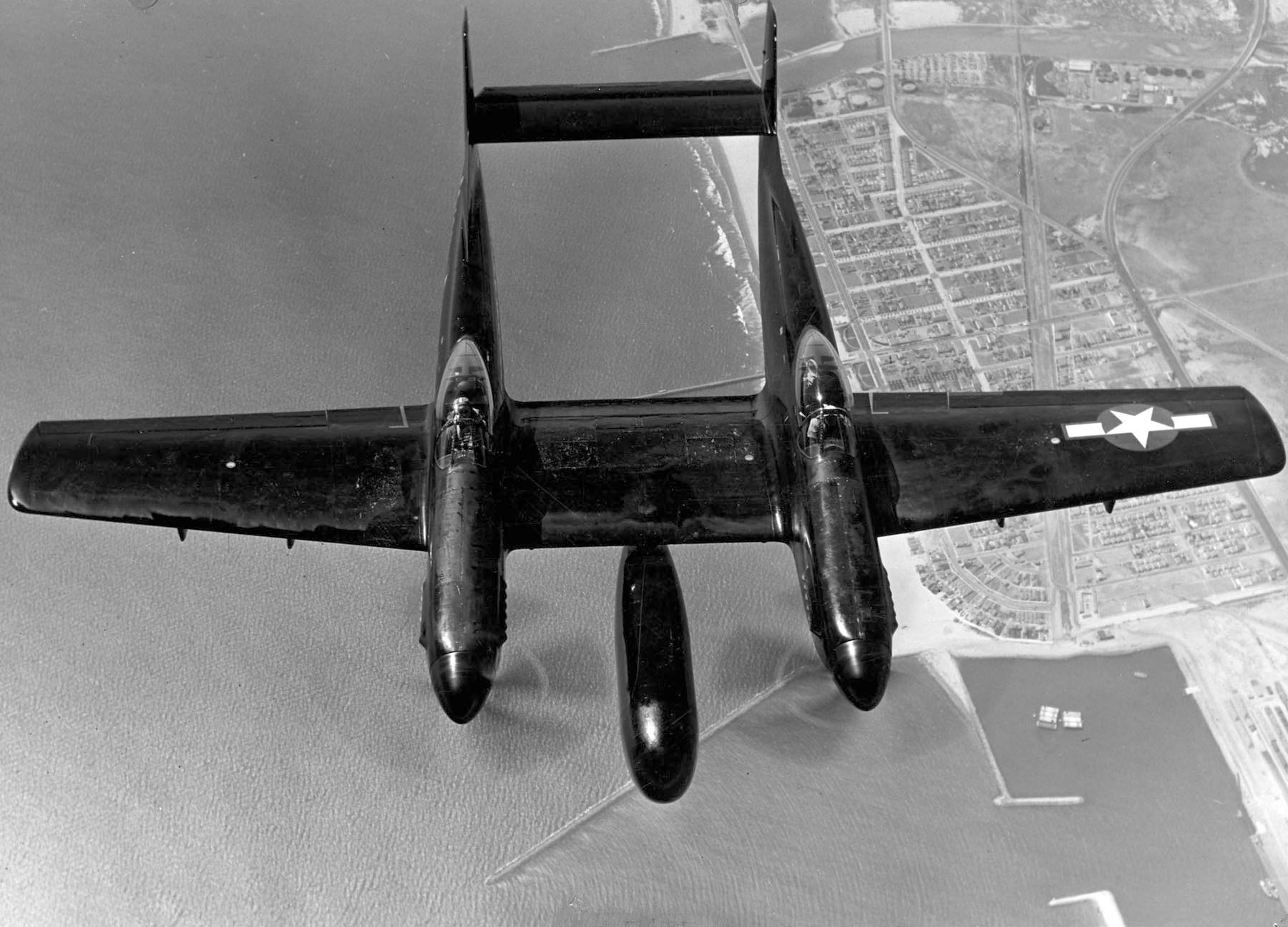
P-82C in black night fighter motif. Note the large pod that carries the radar array under the wing

P-82C
Night fighter version. A P-82B, (44-65169) modified in late 1946, for testing as a night interceptor. The P-82C featured a new nacelle (under the center wing section) housing an SCR-720 radar. The SCR-720 was the same radar installation which was carried aboard the Northrop P-61 Black Widow, a considerably larger aircraft. The right-hand cockpit became the radar operator's position. The production version was designated P-82G.
P-82D
Night fighter version. Another P-82B (44-65170) modified with a different radar, the APS-4. The APS-4 was a much smaller set than the SCR-720, and operated in the 1.18 in (30 mm) waveband. As like the P-82C, the right-hand cockpit became the radar operator's position. The production version was designated P-82F.
F-82E
Escort fighter version. The F-82E followed the F-82B, which it so closely resembled. They were equipped with two counter-rotating Allison liquid-cooled engines, V-1710-143 and V-1710-145. The first four F-82Es were redesignated as F-82As and were allocated for engine testing. After production delays by engine problems and additional testing, F-82Es entered operational service in May 1948. The Air Force accepted 72 F-82Es in fiscal year 1948 (between January and June 1948), and 24 in fiscal year 1949 (22 in July 1948, one in October, and one in December).

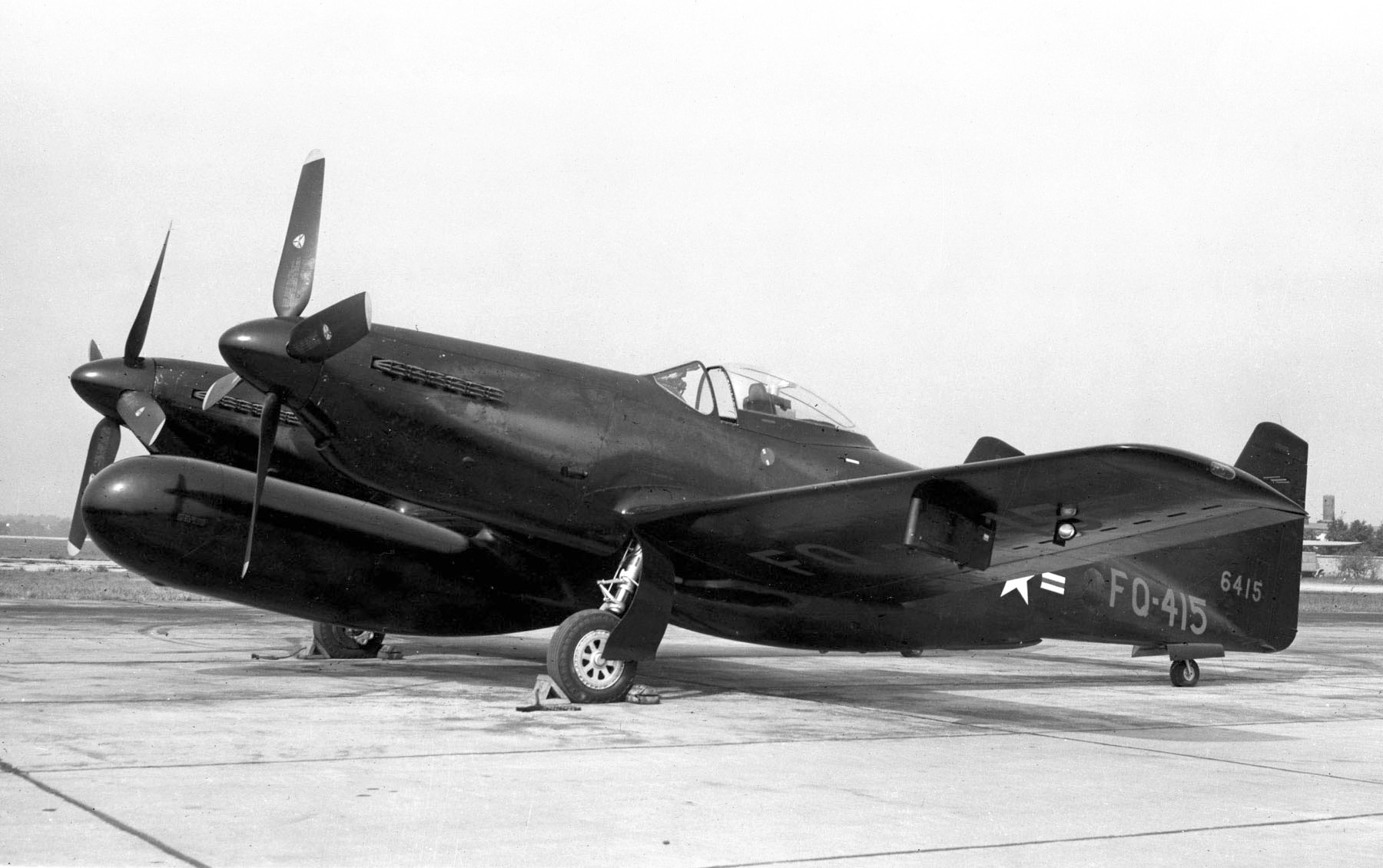
North American F-82F Twin Mustang night fighter

F-82F/G/H
Night fighter versions. A nacelle beneath the center-wing that housed radar equipment (F-82F's AN/APG28 and F-82G's SCR-720C18); automatic pilot; and a radar operator replacing the second pilot. When winterization was added to the F or G, it became an F-82H. Entered operational service in September 1948. One F-82G was accepted in fiscal year 1948 (February 1948), all other F-82s (F, G, and H models) in fiscal year 1949. The last F-82G and six winterized F-82Hs were received in March 1949.

=== Production totals ===
The Air Force accepted a total of 272 F-82s (including 22 prototype, test and early production aircraft). All examples were redesignated as F-82 in 1948. Specifically, the F-82 program consisted of two XF-82s, one XF-82A, 10 F-82Bs (known for a while as P-82Zs and all allocated to testing), four F-82As, 96 F-82Es, 91 F-82Fs, 45 F-82Gs and 14 F-82Hs. All models and variants of the P-82 were produced at North American's Inglewood, California manufacturing plant.

== Operators ==
United States

- United States Air Force

Air Defense Command

- 52d Fighter-All Weather Group (F-82F, 1948–1951)

2d Fighter-All Weather Squadron
5th Fighter-All Weather Squadron

- 325th Fighter-All Weather Group (F-82F, 1948–1951)

317th Fighter-All Weather Squadron
318th Fighter-All Weather Squadron
319th Fighter-All Weather Squadron

Strategic Air Command

- 27th Fighter-Escort Group (F-82E, 1948–1950)

522d Fighter-Escort Squadron
523d Fighter-Escort Squadron
524th Fighter-Escort Squadron

Far East Air Forces

- 347th Fighter-All Weather Group (F-82G, 1948–1952)

4th Fighter-All Weather Squadron (Note: The 4th FAWS was reassigned to Twentieth Air Force and attached to the 51st Fighter-Interceptor Wing on 24 June 1950. It was subsequently attached to the provisional 6302d Air Base Group until the F-82s were replaced in 1951 with F-94 Starfires.)

Attached to 51st Fighter-Interceptor Wing

68th Fighter-All Weather Squadron (Note: The 68th FAWS was reassigned to Fifth Air Force and attached to the 347th Provisional Fighter Group (All Weather) on 27 June 1950 and then to the 8th Fighter-Bomber Wing on 5 July. It was lastly attached to the provisional 6160th Air Base Wing on 1 December 1950 until the F-82s were withdrawn in 1952.)

Attached to 8th Fighter-Interceptor Wing

339th Fighter-All Weather Squadron (Note: The 339th FAWS was reassigned to Fifth Air Force with five aircraft attached to the 347th Provisional Fighter Group (All Weather) on 27 June 1950. It was lastly attached to the provisional 6162d Air Base Wing on 1 December 1950 until the F-82s were withdrawn in 1951.)

Attached to 35th Fighter-Interceptor Wing

Alaskan Air Command

- 5001st Composite Wing (F-82H, 1948–1953)

449th Fighter-All Weather Squadron

Air Force Reserve

- 84th Fighter All-Weather Group (F-82F, 1949–1951)

Associate unit of 52d Fighter All-Weather Group

496th Fighter-All Weather Squadron

Notes for Korean War Service

== Accidents and incidents ==
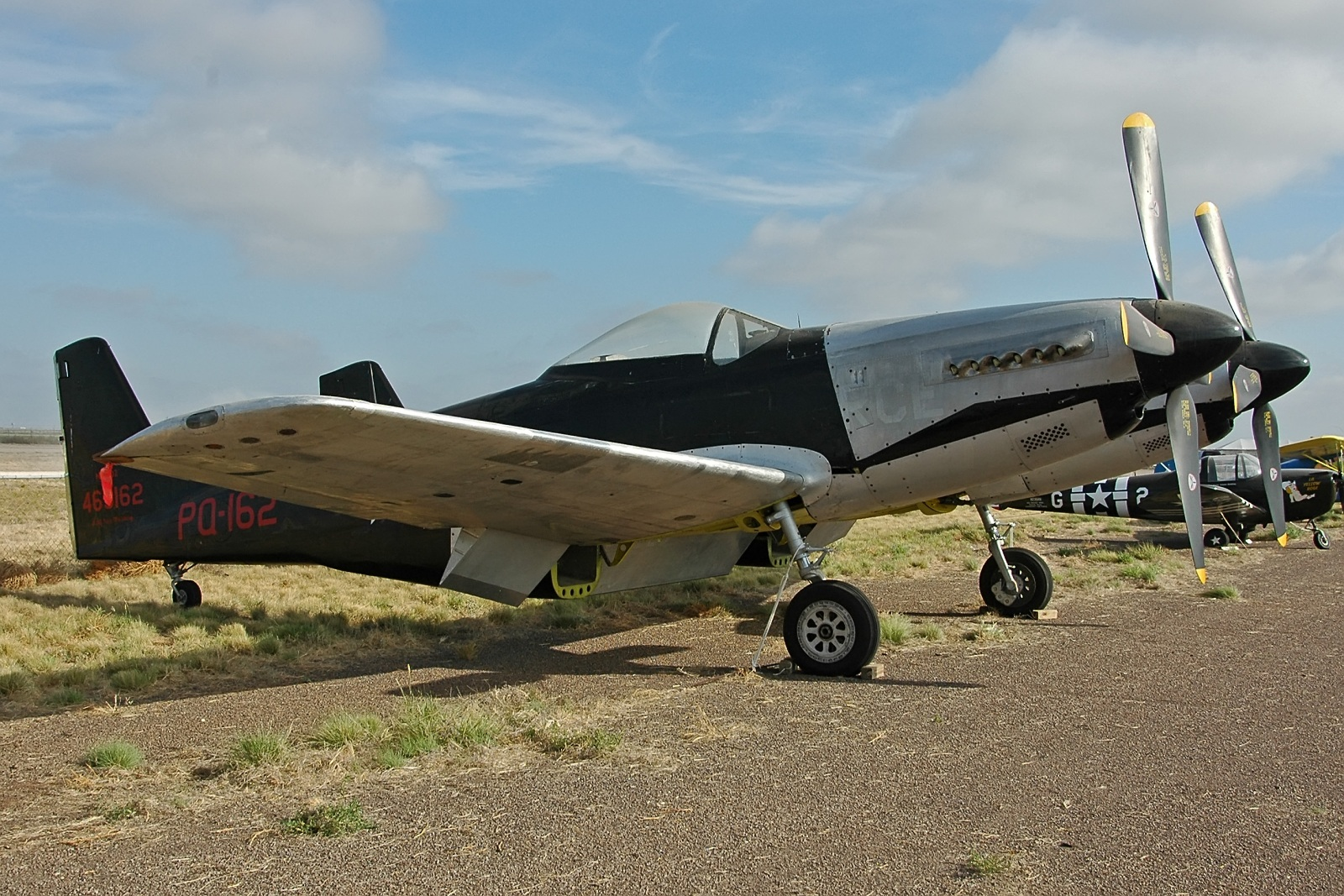
N12102 (ex-44-65162), the aircraft involved in 10 October 1987 accident, seen here under restoration in 2007

25 July 1947
The first North American XP-82, 44-83886, crash landed at Eglin Field, Florida.
1 April 1949
A North American F-82F, 46-413, of the 317th Fighter Squadron/325th Fighter Group, Moses Lake(WA) AFB, crashed 5 miles northeast of Beverly WA, after experiencing a high speed stall. The pilot, Capt. Owen M Wolf of Lewiston ME, died in the crash.
4 May 1949
A North American F-82F, 46-468, piloted by 2nd Lt. Andrew Wallace with 1st Lt. Bryan Jolley as his radar observer, crashed into an unfinished house in Hempstead, New York. The aircraft burst into flames, but Wallace escaped and rescued Jolley by smashing the latter's canopy with a brick.
29 September 1950
A North American F-82G, 46-391, collided with a Lockheed F-80C Shooting Star, 49-704, between Fukuoka and Ashiya, Japan.
10 October 1987
A North American F-82B, N12102 (ex-44-65162), stalled on landing, collapsing the right landing gear. In September 2002, the Commemorative Air Force, the operator of N12102, traded the mostly restored aircraft and a damaged Lockheed P-38 Lightning for an airworthy P-38 from NPA Holdings. The National Museum of the United States Air Force, which had loaned the F-82B to the CAF, demanded that the aircraft be turned over to them per the loan agreement, in which the CAF would return the F-82B to the museum once they no longer wanted it. The aircraft was finally handed over to the museum in 2008 following a lawsuit filed by the United States Air Force against the CAF, and is currently on display, painted to represent an F-82G.

== Surviving aircraft ==
Five F-82s are known to still exist.

Airworthy

XP-82

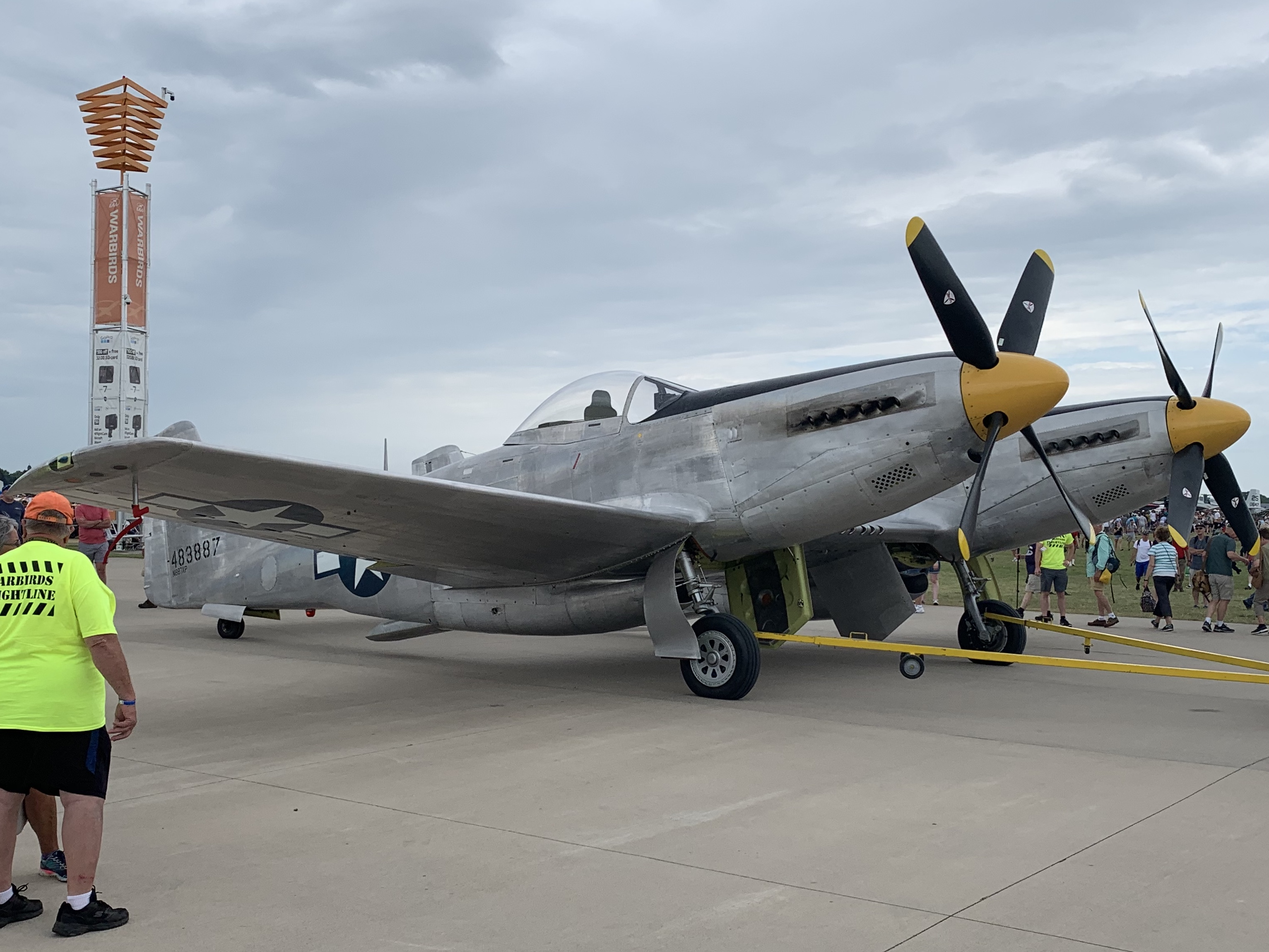
North American XP-82 Twin Mustang EAA AirVenture Oshkosh in 2019

- 44-83887 – restored to flying status in Douglas, Georgia and first flown on 31 December 2018. During the restoration process, a number of written notes and graffiti by the original factory workers were found on internal surfaces. These were preserved and later reapplied to the interior of the finished aircraft. Registered as FAA tail number N887XP, as of January 2022, this aircraft is currently on loan in flying condition to the Valiant Air Command Warbird Museum at Space Coast Regional Airport in Titusville, Florida.

On display

F-82B

- 44-65162 – Displayed at the National Museum of the United States Air Force at Wright-Patterson AFB in Dayton, Ohio.

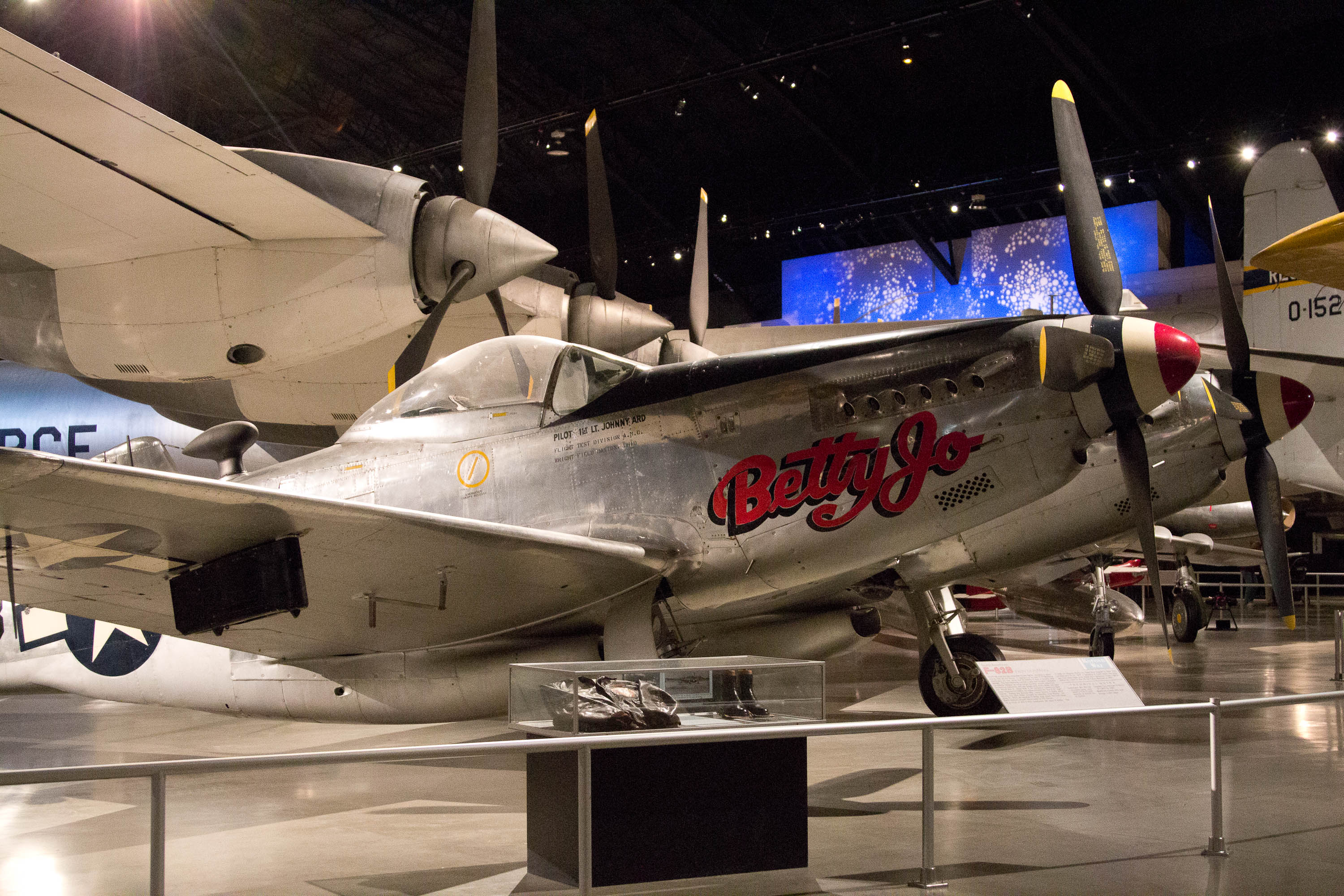
Betty Jo is one of two F-82Bs in the NMUSAF collection at Wright-Patterson Air Force Base.

- 44-65168 Betty Jo – Displayed at the National Museum of the United States Air Force at Wright-Patterson AFB in Dayton, Ohio in its Cold War gallery.

F-82E

- 46-0262 – Displayed as a gate guard at Lackland AFB in Texas as part of the USAF Airman Heritage Museum in San Antonio, Texas.

Under Restoration

F-82E

- 46-0256 – currently under restoration to flying status. It was at the Walter Soplata farm. Previously with the NACA and registered as FAA tail number.

== Specifications (F-82G) ==
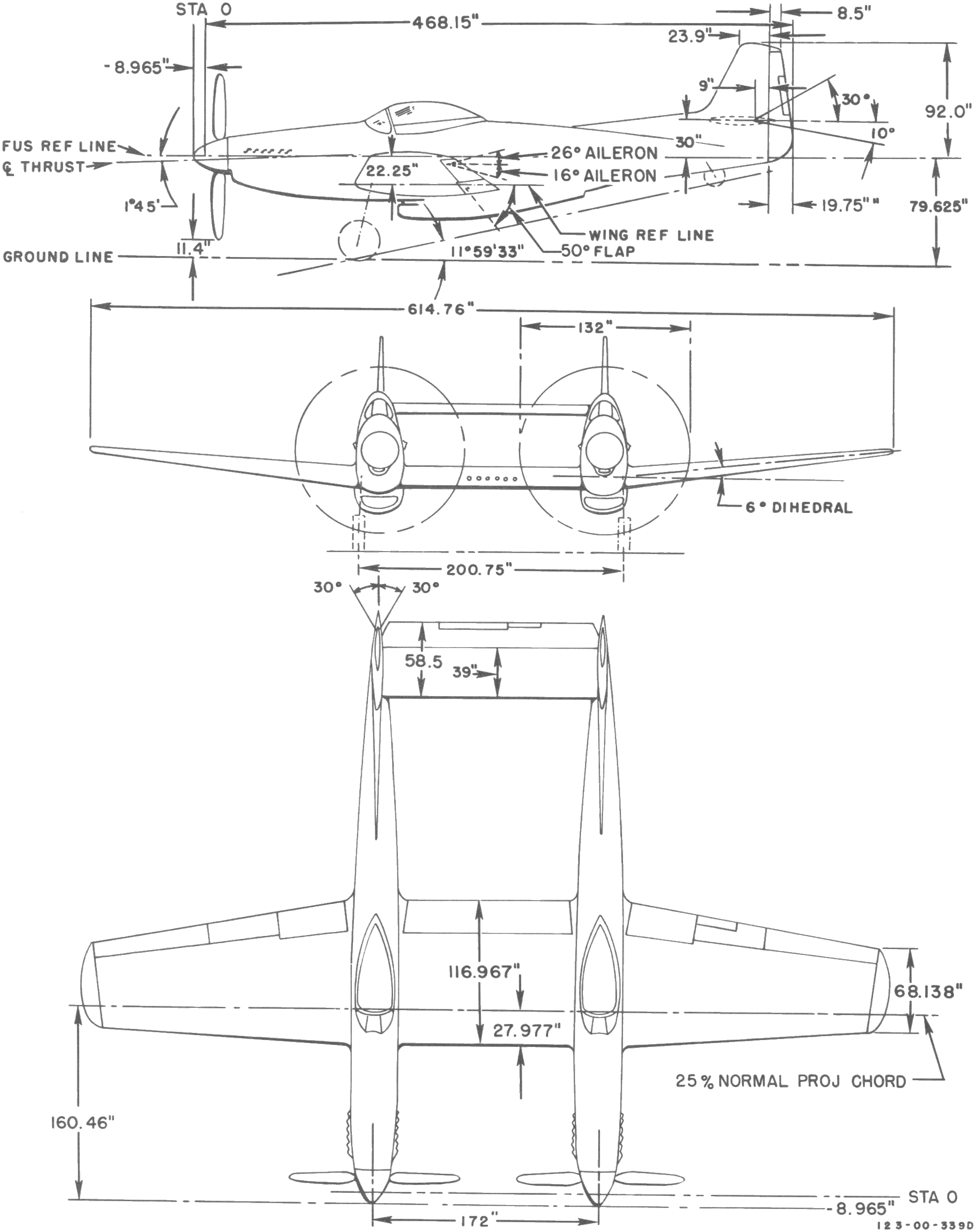
3-view line drawing of the North American P-82E Twin Mustang

Data from The Concise Guide to American Aircraft of World War II, Pilot's Handbook for Army models P-82F, and G Airplanes 10 September 1947 AN 01-60JJB-1

General characteristics

- Crew: 2
- Length: 39 ft 5 in (12.01 m)
- Wingspan: 51 ft 3 in (15.62 m)
- Height: 11 ft 10 in (3.61 m)
- Wing area: 408 sq ft (37.9 m^{2})
- Empty weight: 15,997 lb (7,256 kg)
- Max takeoff weight: 25,591 lb (11,608 kg)
- Powerplant: 1 × V-12 liquid-cooled piston engine Allison V-1710-143, 2,250 hp (1,680 kW) in War emergency rating, RH rotation fitted to port
- Powerplant: 1 × V-12 liquid-cooled piston engine Allison V-1710-145, 2,250 hp (1,680 kW) in War emergency rating, LH rotation fitted to starboard
- Propellers: 4-bladed Aeroproducts A-542F-D1 constant-speed fully-feathering propeller (LHS)

Aeroproducts AL-542F-D1 constant-speed fully-feathering propeller (RHS), 10 ft 11 in (3.33 m) diameter

Performance

- Maximum speed: 461 mph (742 km/h, 401 kn) at 21,000 ft (6,400 m)
- Cruise speed: 286 mph (460 km/h, 249 kn)
- Range: 2,240 mi (3,600 km, 1,950 nmi)
- Service ceiling: 38,900 ft (11,900 m)

Armament

- Guns: 6 .5 in (12.7 mm) M3 Browning machine guns
- Rockets: 25 5 in (130 mm) rockets
- Bombs: 4 1,000 lb (450 kg) bombs

== See also ==
- Heavy fighter

Related development

- North American P-51 Mustang

Aircraft of comparable role, configuration, and era

- de Havilland Hornet
- Grumman F7F Tigercat
- Heinkel He 219
- Lockheed XP-58 Chain Lightning
- Messerschmitt Bf 109Z "Zwilling"
- Messerschmitt Me 609
- Mitsubishi Ki-83
- Northrop P-61 Black Widow
- Savoia-Marchetti SM.92

Related lists

- List of fighter aircraft
- List of twin fuselage aircraft
