= Towed glider air-launch system =

NASA designed system to launch vehicles into space orbit

TGALS
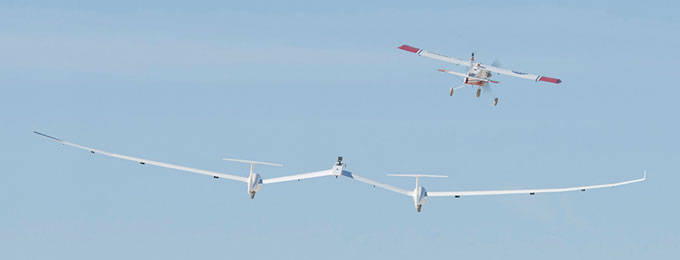
- Scale model demonstration flight of TGALS
- Function: Autonomous air launch to orbit multivehicle system
- Manufacturer: NASA Armstrong Flight Research Center

Size
- Stages: Three, two reusable

First stage
- Burn time: 20 seconds

Towed glider air-launch system (abbv. TGALS) is a NASA-designed two-stage air-launched reusable launch system currently in development at NASA's Armstrong Flight Research Center. The system uses a glider, tow plane, and rocket and is designed to carry small satellites to orbit. Both the glider and tow plane are reusable.

The system, compared to other designs such as Swiss Space Systems' SOAR spaceplane and Virgin Galactic's SpaceShipTwo vehicle, is launched from a glider. This design emulates an air-launched multistage rocket with two recoverable stages: the tow plane and the glider itself.

== Design ==
The system comprises three large components: a tow plane, a glider, and a rocket. The tow plane, a conventional small aircraft, carries the glider up to about 40,000 feet (12,000 m) before releasing the towline and flying back. The glider, carrying its own hybrid or solid rocket motor, will ignite its engine to glide higher than the tow plane's maximum altitude. Following burnout of its rocket, the glider will jettison the third (exclusively rocket powered) stage of the system. This rocket stage will then carry its satellite payload into low Earth orbit.

NASA's concept aims to create a platform that can launch 15 times the mass of the glider, compared to 0.7 times for other air-launch reusable spaceflight systems. According to Aero News, the advantage of the system is that gliders don't carry engines with them and have longer, lighter wings, resulting in lower total mass. NASA discussed the advantages of this system in a report:

The TGALS demonstration's goal is to provide proof-of-concept of a towed, airborne launch platform. Distinct advantages are believed possible in cost, logistic efficiency, and performance when utilizing a towed, high lift-to-drag launch platform as opposed to utilizing a traditional powered 'mothership' launch platform. The project goal is to examine the performance advantage, as well as the operational aspects, of a towed, airborne launch system.

According to Gerrard Budd, the development manager of NASA Armstrong Center's air launch program, "[NASA] thinks that [the glider] is the optimization for air launch", comparing the design of the system to other air launch systems in development.

=== Tow plane ===
Original testing of the glider was performed using NASA Armstrong DROID Aircraft. Due to a combination of the projected mass, and thus drag of the glider with a rocket aboard, as well as the operating altitude required for testing, a larger tow aircraft was built. Dubbed the "Micro Cub", it is a heavily modified Hempel 60% Super Cub using a JetCat SPT 15 turbo prop.

=== Glider ===
The glider design is based on a twin fuselage. NASA engineers plan to suspend the rocket stage below the center section of the glider wing. The glider will carry its own small rocket motor which will light for about 20 seconds after release from the tow plane to maintain velocity while climbing. The glider will then glide at a 70-degree angle.

== Test flights ==
On 21 October 2014, NASA conducted the maiden test flight of a one-third scale model of the twin fuselage glider using NASA Armstrong's DROID aircraft, an autonomous airplane. The flight was successful.

== Future ==
NASA plans to test the feasibility of releasing a small unpowered rocket from the one-third scale glider, followed by mounting a small rocket motor on the glider to test the feasibility of a rocket-assisted glider design. Further plans involve the construction of a full-scale platform. The project has obtained funding for NASA's 2015 financial year through the Game Changing Development program following the first successful test flight of the one-third scale glider.
