= Blackburn Twin Blackburn =

1915 British Anti-Zeppelin fighter aircraft

Twin Blackburn

General information
- Type: Anti-Zeppelin fighter
- Manufacturer: Blackburn
- Primary user: Royal Naval Air Service
- Number built: 9

History
- Introduction date: 1916
- First flight: August 1915
- Retired: 1917

The Blackburn TB (for "Twin Blackburn") was a long-range twin-engined anti-Zeppelin seaplane. It was Blackburn's first multi-engine aircraft to fly.

== Design and development ==
The first attacks by German bombing airships on the United Kingdom in the winter of 1914–15 resulted in the British Admiralty issuing a requirement for a two-seat aircraft with long endurance to attack Zeppelins by dropping incendiary Ranken darts onto the airships in the hope of igniting their gas envelopes, with an order for nine Blackburn TBs being placed in March 1915.

The TB was a seaplane with twin fuselages, situated 10 ft (3.35 m) apart, with the pilot in one fuselage and the observer in the other, having no means of communication other than hand signals. Each of the twin fuselages was a wooden structure with fabric covering, with a tractor engine in front of each fuselage. It had fabric-covered, wooden unstaggered, unswept and unequal-span wings. The upper wing extension was wire braced to steel pylons above the wing. The Blackburn had ailerons on the upper wings only.

Although it was intended that the TB would be powered by two 150 hp (112 kW) Smith Static radial engines, which promised low weight and good fuel consumption, these proved to be unsatisfactory, and 100 hp (75 kW) Gnome Monosoupape 9 Type B-2 had to be substituted, this allowing the first aircraft to fly in August 1915.

Testing showed that the two Gnome engines gave insufficient power, with the aircraft being unable to climb above 8,000 ft (2,438 m) carrying the required three canisters of 24 1 lb (.5 kg) Ranken darts. The weapon load was therefore reduced to two canisters.

The ninth (and final) TB was fitted with 110 hp (80 kW) Clerget engines with the hope of improving performance. This modification was found to have little effect.

== Operational history ==
Seven TBs were delivered to the Royal Naval Air Service. They did not see much action, four serving for a short time at RNAS Killingholme in 1917. All seven, together with the remaining two that were held in store, were broken up in 1917.

== Operators ==
United Kingdom

- Royal Naval Air Service

== Specifications (TB) ==
Data from The British Bomber since 1914

General characteristics

- Crew: 2
- Length: 36 ft 6 in (11.13 m)
- Wingspan: 60 ft 6 in (18.44 m)
- Height: 13 ft 6 in (4.11 m)
- Wing area: 585 sq ft (54.3 m^{2})
- Empty weight: 2,310 lb (1,048 kg)
- Gross weight: 3,500 lb (1,588 kg)
- Powerplant: 2 × Gnome Monosoupape 9 Type B-2 9-cylinder air-cooled rotary piston engines, 100 hp (75 kW) each
- Propellers: 2-bladed fixed-pitch propellers

Performance

- Maximum speed: 86 mph (138 km/h, 75 kn)
- Endurance: 4 hours
- Time to altitude: 5,000 ft (1,524 m) in 12 minutes

Armament

- Bombs: 3 × canisters, each with 24 × 1 lb (.5 kg) Ranken incendiary darts (intended)

== Sources ==
- Jackson, A.J. (1968). Blackburn Aircraft since 1909. London: Putnam. ISBN 0-370-00053-6.
- Mason, Francis K (1994). The British Bomber since 1914. Putnam Aeronautical Books. ISBN 0-85177-861-5.
