= Messerschmitt Me 609 =

German heavy fighter project

Me 609
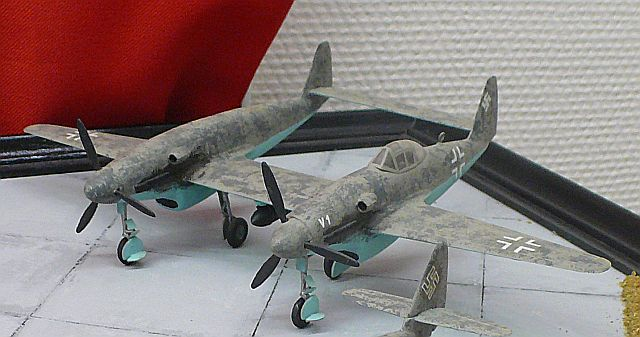
- A model of the Me 609.

General information
- Type: Heavy fighter
- Manufacturer: Messerschmitt
- Status: design study only

History
- Developed from: Messerschmitt Me 309

The Messerschmitt Me 609 (alternatively Me 309 Zwilling) was a World War II German project which joined two fuselages of the Me 309 fighter prototype together to form a heavy fighter.

== Design and development ==
The project was initiated in response to a 1941 Reich Air Ministry requirement for a new Zerstörer (destroyer) to replace the Bf 110 in a minimum time and with a minimum of new parts. Messerschmitt's response was the Me 609, which would use the failed Me 309 project to form the basis of the new fighter. The Me 609 would have joined the two Me 309 fuselages with a new centre wing section. Only the two inner wheels of the joined Me 309's main landing gears would have been used and would retract into the centre section. This resulted in an unusual four-wheel arrangement. The pilot would have sat in a cockpit located in the port fuselage, with the starboard being smoothed over.

Two versions were planned: a heavy fighter with four or six 30 mm MK 108 cannons, and a Schnellbomber (fast bomber) variant with two 30 mm MK 108 cannons and a bomb load of 1,000 kg (2,200 lb) carried beneath the fuselages. However, by late December 1942, Messerschmitt Me 609 project was cancelled at the drawing board.

== Designation ==
One source claims that the Me 609 was actually a cover designation for test-ready, late-war Me 262s, not the twin-fuselage Me 309. However, this claim contradicts most other sources.

== Specifications (Me 609, as designed) ==
Data from

General characteristics

- Crew: 1
- Length: 9.72 m (31 ft 11 in)
- Wingspan: 15.75 m (51 ft 8 in)
- Height: 3.43 m (11 ft 3 in)
- Empty weight: 5,247 kg (11,568 lb)
- Gross weight: 6,534 kg (14,405 lb)
- Powerplant: 2 × Daimler-Benz DB 603
- Propellers: 3-bladed constant-speed propellers

Performance

- Maximum speed: 760 km/h (470 mph, 410 kn)

Armament

- Guns: 2 × 30 mm (1.18 in) MK 108 cannons
- 4 × 30 mm (1.18 in) MK 108 cannons
- Bombs: 1000 kg (2,204 lb) of bombs

== See also ==
Related development

- Bf 109
- Me 209
- Me 209-II
- Me 309
- Me 509

Aircraft of comparable role, configuration, and era

- P-82 Twin Mustang
- Heinkel He 111Z Zwilling ("Twins")

Related lists

- List of military aircraft of Germany
- List of World War II military aircraft of Germany

== Sources ==
- Green, William. War Planes of the Second World War, Fighters, vol. I. London: Hanover House, 1960.
- Lepage, Jean-Denis G.G. Aircraft of the Luftwaffe, 1935–1945: An Illustrated Guide. Jefferson, North Carolina: McFarland & Company, 2009. ISBN 978-0-7864-3937-9
