= BFW M.26 =

M.26

General information
- Type: Light airliner
- National origin: Germany
- Manufacturer: Bayerische Flugzeugwerke (BFW)
- Designer: Willy Messerschmitt
- Number built: 1

History
- First flight: 1930

The BFW M.26 was a single-engined cantilever-winged monoplane light airliner built in Germany in 1930. There were no sales and only one was built.

== Design and development ==
The BFW M.26 was a light civil aircraft, designed to carry two to three passengers in an enclosed cabin. The pilot's position was also enclosed. It was a high cantilever-winged monoplane in the style of Messerschmitt's earlier three-cabin aircraft, the successful BFW M.18 and BFW M.20, and the commercially unsuccessful BFW M.24, though smaller than any of them. A typical Messerschmitt square section fuselage narrowed steadily to the tail with its very angular fin and rudder. The latter was cut away at the base to allow for the movement of the single-piece elevator. The main undercarriage was of the split-axle type.

The M.26 was powered by a 100 hp (45 kW) Siemens Sh 11 radial engine, mounted uncowled with the seven cylinder heads protruding for cooling. It drove a two-bladed propeller.

The aircraft first flew in 1930, but no production ensued and only one M.26 was built. A version with a 175 hp (130 kW) Wright Whirlwind was considered under the designation M.30, but not built.

== Specifications ==
Data from Smith 1971, p. 28

General characteristics

- Crew: one
- Capacity: two/six passengers
- Length: 7.15 m (23 ft 5.5 in)
- Wingspan: 1.40 m (40 ft 8.25 in)
- Height: 2.30 m (7 ft 6.5 in)
- Empty weight: 460 kg (1,014 lb)
- Gross weight: 700 kg (1,543 lb)
- Powerplant: 1 × Siemens Sh 11 7-cylinder radial engine , 75 kW (100 hp)
