= BFW M.22 =

Prototype, 1928 German bomber

M.22
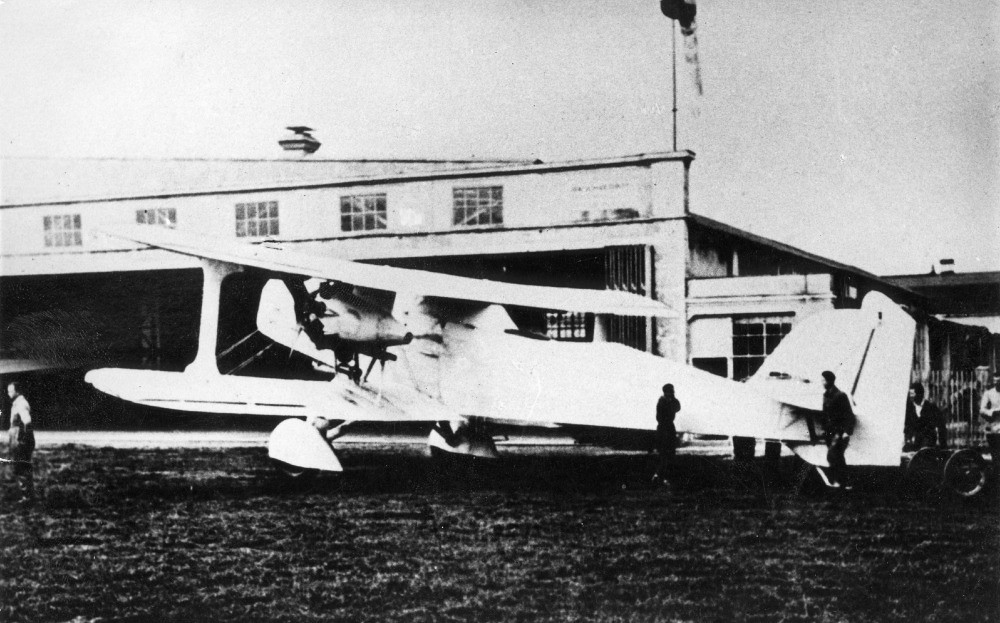
- BFW M.22

General information
- Type: Medium bomber
- National origin: Germany
- Manufacturer: Bayerische Flugzeugwerke (BFW)
- Designer: Willy Messerschmitt
- Number built: 1

History
- First flight: 1928

The BFW M.22 was a twin-engined medium bomber, designed by Willy Messerschmitt for the German Ministry of Transport. It was one of only two biplanes Messerschmitt designed, both unsuccessful.

== Development ==
During 1927, following the success of his M.18 airliner, Messerschmitt tried to gain funding from the Baverian government; because the latter was already subsidising BFW (Bayerische Flugzeug-Werke), they pressed for an arrangement whereby Willy Messerschmitt joined BFW on the understanding that the company produce only his designs. During these negotiations, completed on 8 September 1927, the Ministry of Transport put pressure on Messerschmitt to produce military aircraft. This led to the only two biplanes Messerschmitt ever designed, the second of which was the BFW M.22 medium bomber, otherwise known as the Messerschmitt M 22.

It was a twin-engined biplane, with broad chord I-form interplane struts and ailerons on both wings. It had a conventional tail with an externally-braced tailplane. The upper wing was raised above the fuselage by a long faired pylon, which separated the forward pilot's cockpit and the nose gunner's position from a dorsal gunner's position. The main undercarriage was a wide-track, split-axle design, with the mainwheels in spats, and a tailskid.

The M.22 was powered by two 500 hp (373 kW) Siemens licence-built Bristol Jupiter radials, designated Siemens-Halske Sh-20 or Sh-21. These were mounted midway between the wings in long faired housings, with the cylinder heads protruding for cooling. It flew for the first time in 1928. The M.22 was very different from Messerschmitt's trademark high-wing cantilever monoplanes, like the M.19 and M.20, and unsurprisingly failed to receive a production order. Only one was built.

== Specifications ==
Data from Smith 1971, p. 22

General characteristics

- Crew: three
- Length: 13.60 m (44 ft 7.5 in)
- Wingspan: 17.00 m (55 ft 9.25 in)
- Height: 4.80 m (15 ft 9 in)
- Empty weight: 2,900 kg (6,395 lb)
- Gross weight: 3,800 kg (8,380 lb)
- Powerplant: 2 × Siemens-Halske Sh-20 7-cylinder radials , 373 kW (500 hp) each

Performance

- Maximum speed: 220 km/h (137 mph, 119 kn)
- Range: 500 km (311 mi, 270 nmi)

Armament

- front and dorsal machine gun positions
