= Messerschmitt M 24 =

M 24

General information
- Type: Airliner
- National origin: Germany
- Manufacturer: Bayerische Flugzeugwerke (BFW)
- Designer: Willy Messerschmitt
- Number built: 4

History
- First flight: 1929
- Developed from: Messerschmitt M 18, Messerschmitt M 20

The Messerschmitt M 24, otherwise known as the BFW M.24, was an airliner developed in Germany in the late 1920s as a further development in the series of designs produced by Messerschmitt, based on the M 18. Like the M 18 and its follow-on, the M 20, it was a high-wing cantilever monoplane with a fully enclosed cabin and fixed tailwheel undercarriage. It was slightly smaller than the M 20, seating only eight passengers instead of the ten that could be carried by the previous aircraft.

Two prototypes were initially built with BMW and Junkers inline engines, followed by two more with BMW-built Pratt & Whitney radials. However, Messerschmitt proved unable to sell the design, possibly due at least in part to the enmity of Deutsche Luft Hansa director Erhard Milch towards Messerschmitt.

The first M 24a (Junkers-engined, registered D-1767) was used commercially from 1930 by Nordbayerische Verkersflug on the Dresden-Chemnitz-Plauen-Nuremberg route, until it was lost in 1934.

== Variants ==
- M 24a - prototypes with BMW Va and Junkers L5G engines (two built)
- M 24b - prototypes with BMW-built Pratt & Whitney Hornet engines (two built)

== Specifications (M 24b) ==
General characteristics

- Crew: two
- Capacity: eight passengers
- Length: 12.80 m (42 ft 0 in)
- Wingspan: 20.60 m (27 ft 7 in)
- Height: 4.20 m (13 ft 9 in)
- Wing area: 43 m^{2} (462 sq ft)
- Empty weight: 1,480 kg (3,260 lb)
- Gross weight: 3,000 kg (6,600 lb)
- Powerplant: 1 × BMW-built Pratt & Whitney Hornet , 447 kW (600 hp)

Performance

- Maximum speed: 220 km/h (140 mph, 120 kn)
- Range: 800 km (500 mi, 430 nmi)
- Service ceiling: 5,500 m (18,000 ft)
