= ICAR Comercial =

1930s German aircraft

I.C.A.R. 36 Comercial
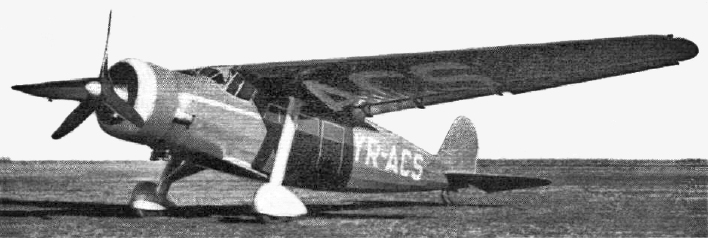

General information
- Type: Passenger aircraft
- National origin: Germany & Romania
- Manufacturer: Întreprinderea de Construcții Aeronautice Românești (ICAR)
- Designer: Willy Messerschmitt
- Primary user: LARES
- Number built: 1

History
- Introduction date: 1936
- First flight: 1934

The ICAR 36 / ICAR Comercial (sic), variously also known as the ICAR M 36, Messerschmitt M 36 or BFW M.36, was a Messerschmitt design built and tested by the Romanian company ICAR in the mid-1930s. It was a small, single-engine high-wing airliner, the first civil transport aircraft built in Romania.

== Design & development ==
In April 1933, Erhard Milch, previously head of Deutsche Luft Hansa, was appointed Secretary of State for Air. Relations between Milch and Willy Messerschmitt had been bad ever since the cancellation and later re-ordering of the BFW M.20 by Luft Hansa, and the future of orders for BFW looked bleak. That summer, a visit was made to Romania, where an order was placed by Întreprinderea de Construcții Aeronautice Românești (ICAR) for the design of a small airliner, to be built by them in Romania. ICAR designated it the ICAR 36; Messerschmitt, working at BFW referred to it as the M 36.

== Description ==
The ICAR 36 was a high-wing cantilever monoplane of mixed construction, with a closed cockpit, single engine, and fixed landing gear. It had a welded steel tube fuselage, covered with plywood, and tapered single-spar, plywood-covered wings. The crew of two sat in the cockpit, forward of the wing, which was equipped with a radio and could be fitted with twin controls. The cabin for six passengers, with wide rectangular windows and access doors at the rear, was aft and below the cockpit / wings. There were also two baggage compartments.

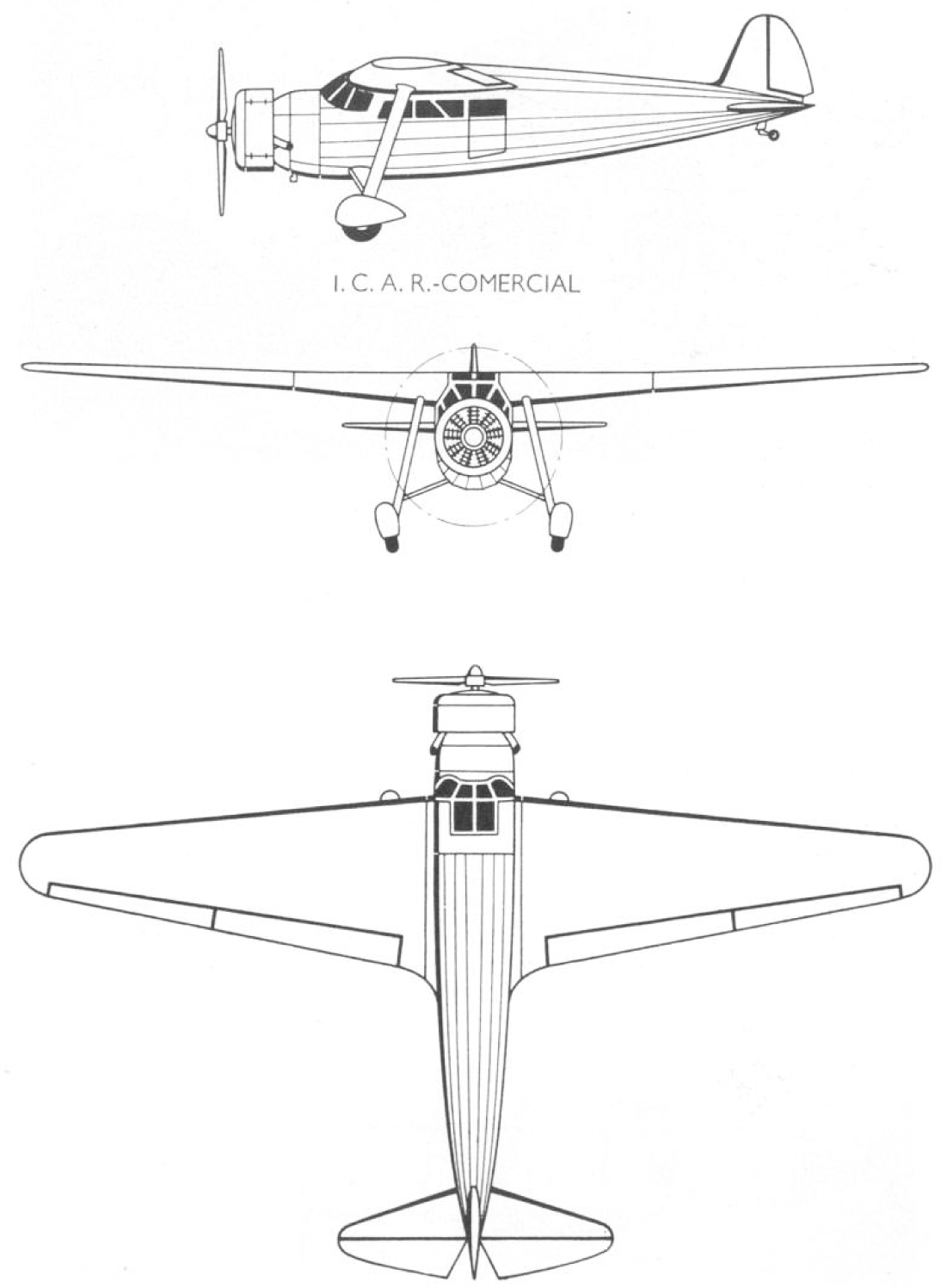

One aircraft (YR-ACS) was built, later modified with a cabin for five passengers and two luggage compartments. Initially intended to be powered by a licence-built 340 kW (450 hp) Gnome & Rhône 7K radial engine, the aircraft was eventually fitted with a 280 kW (380 hp) Armstrong Siddeley Serval I ten-cylinder radial engine in a NACA cowling., which was, in turn, replaced with a 220 kW (300 hp) Lorraine 7M Mizar 47, driving a three-bladed propeller. The fixed landing gear was supported by long faired vertical struts to the wings, with teardrop spats over the mainwheels and a tailwheel at the end of the fuselage.

A tri-motor development was planned, but not realized.

== Operational history ==
Only one aircraft was built, operated by LARES on several internal routes including the Bucharest to Cernauti route.

== Operators ==
Romania

- LARES

== Specifications (I.C.A.R. 36 Comercial) ==
Data from

General characteristics

- Crew: two
- Capacity: six / 960 kg (2,120 lb) payload
- Length: 9.8 m (32 ft 2 in)
- Wingspan: 15.4 m (50 ft 6 in)
- Height: 2.8 m (9 ft 2 in)
- Wing area: 155 m^{2} (1,670 sq ft)
- Empty weight: 1,320 kg (2,910 lb)
- Gross weight: 2,250 kg (4,960 lb)
- Powerplant: 1 × Armstrong Siddeley Serval I 10-cyl. double-row air-cooled radial piston engine, 250 kW (340 hp)

Performance

- Maximum speed: 235 km/h (146 mph, 127 kn)
- Cruise speed: 220 km/h (140 mph, 120 kn)
- Stall speed: 89 km/h (55 mph, 48 kn)
- Range: 700 km (430 mi, 380 nmi)
- Service ceiling: 4,500 m (14,800 ft)

== See also ==
Related development

- Messerschmitt M.18

Aircraft of comparable role, configuration, and era

- PWS-24bis – Lockheed Vega
