= Friedrich Harth =

German glider pioneer

Friedrich Harth (Born 1880 in Zentbechhofen, - died 1936) was a German glider pioneer. Between 1908 and 1923, Harth built twelve different types of gliders and laid the foundations for the development of gliding.

== Life ==
Harth was the son of a head forester and attended elementary school in Bamberg, high school in Landshut, and graduated from high school in Munich. In addition to his subsequent architecture studies, he dealt with the knowledge of the first German glider pilot Otto Lilienthal and began to build a glider after his return to Bamberg. He built wings, buckled them around his body with a belt, and tested them. In 1909 while working as a government builder, he began building gliders.

In 1910, Harth's first attempt to fly started on the Ludwager Kulm, near Bamberg. The summit's plateau and steep western slope favored gliding. His gliders consisted of an open or closed hull with a fixed fin. The angle of attack of the wings could be changed in the same direction or in opposite directions in order to serve as an elevator or aileron. In November, this first aircraft was severely damaged in a crash on frozen ground. Unwaveringly, Harth used knowledge from the failed attempts to build improve his gliders. The rotary wing control remained an essential feature of his gliders.

Serving as a senior construction city council member, Harth spent his free time designing and testing his flying machines. Enlisting helper Willy Messerschmitt, the 15-year-old son of a Bamberg wine merchant, who later became Harth's student. After the outbreak of the First World War, Harth was drafted into military service interrupting his flight attempts. During this time, Messerschmitt built the S5 glider according to Harth's plans. During Harth's home leave, he flew to an altitude of 20m and traveled 300m from the Heidelstein starting point. In 1916 he was transferred to Schleißheim, where he taught aircraft construction. Harth built the S6 glider and flew it to a landing site 15m higher than his starting point on an almost three-minute flight. His post war glider, the S7, was built in the early summer of 1919 while working at the Bayerische Flugzeugwerke (BFW – Bavarian Aircraft Works).

On September 13, 1921, Harth accomplished a record 21 minute and 27 second glider flight from the Heidelstein in the Rhön Mountains with his monoplane glider, the Harth-Messerschmitt S8. This record flight ended abruptly with a crash, and Harth was severely injured with a severe concussion and a fractured skull and pelvis, from which he never recovered fully. In 1924 impoverished by his job loss, he lived on welfare. Harth was a supporter of the National Socialists and a party member of the NSDAP (Nazi party) until his death in 1936.

=== Friedrich Harth and Willy Messerschmitt aircraft ===
- Harth S-1 (Friedrich Harth)
- Harth-Messerschmitt S-03
- Harth-Messerschmitt S-04
- Harth-Messerschmitt S-05
- Harth-Messerschmitt S-06
- Harth-Messerschmitt S-07
- Harth-Messerschmitt S-08
- Harth-Messerschmitt S-09

(from 1922–1925)

- Harth-Messerschmitt S-10
- Harth-Messerschmitt S-11
- Harth-Messerschmitt S-12

== Sources ==
- Eva-Maria Bast, Annina Baur: What shaped Bamberg. 52 large and small encounters with the city's history. Bast Medien in cooperation with the Franconian Day, Überlingen 2017, ISBN 978-3-946581-21-5.
- Gerhard Wissmann: Adventure in the wind and clouds. The history of gliding. Transpress, Berlin 1988, ISBN 3-344-00275-9.
- Günter Brinkmann, Hans Zacher: The evolution of gliders. In: German aviation. Bernard & Graefe, Bonn 1992, ISBN 3-7637-6104-7.
