= BFW M.27 =

Two-seated sport plane developed by Messerschmitt

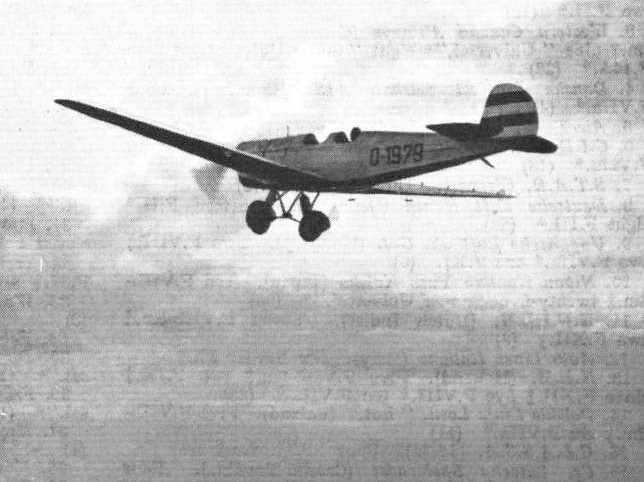

General information
- Type: two seat sports plane
- National origin: Germany
- Manufacturer: Bayerische Flugzeugwerke (BFW)
- Designer: Willy Messerschmitt
- Number built: 12

History
- First flight: 1930
- Developed from: BFW M.23

The BFW M.27, sometimes known as the Messerschmitt M.27, was a German two-seat sports plane with a low, cantilever wing, open cockpits and a fixed undercarriage sold in small numbers at the start of the 1930s.

== Development ==
In the late 1920s and early 1930s, Willy Messerschmitt, working at Bayerische Flugzeugwerke (BFW) produced a series of low-wing sports monoplanes with either one or two seats. These were the M.19, M.23, M.27, M.31 and M.35 with the M.23, the only one with sales of much over double figures. The M stood for Messerschmitt.

The M.27 was a two-seater, very similar to the M.23b but with a more rounded fin and rudder assembly, a fuselage stretched by about 1,400 mm (55 in) to accommodate luggage and a new, spatted undercarriage. Pilot and passenger sat in tandem in separate open cockpits.

It was successfully raced, winning the Deutschland Competition in 1932 and coming second in the Zugspitz Circuit in 1933. Nonetheless, it was not sold in large numbers.

== Variants ==
M.27a
82 kW (110 hp) Siemens Sh 12 radial engine or Argus As 8B four-cylinder air-cooled inverted inline engine delivering 86 kW (115 hp) (continuous).
M.27b
Argus As 8R four-cylinder high-compression air-cooled inverted inline sport engine delivering 95 kW (127 hp) (continuous).

== Specifications (M.27b) ==
Data from

General characteristics

- Crew: 2
- Length: 7.90 m (25 ft 11 in)
- Wingspan: 12.00 m (39 ft 8.5 in)
- Height: 2.40 m (7 ft 10.5 in)
- Empty weight: 420 kg (926 lb)
- Gross weight: 720 kg (1,588 lb)
- Powerplant: 1 × Argus As 8R four-cylinder inverted inline air-cooled , 90 kW (120 hp)

Performance

- Maximum speed: 200 km/h (124 mph, 108 kn)
- Range: 700 km (435 mi, 378 nmi)
