= BFW M.31 =

M.31
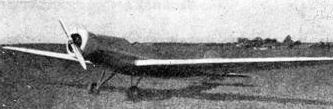

General information
- Type: Two-seat sports plane
- National origin: Germany
- Manufacturer: Bayerische Flugzeugwerke (BFW)
- Designer: Willy Messerschmitt
- Number built: 1

History
- First flight: 1932

The BFW M.31, sometimes known as the Messerschmitt M.31, was a radial-engined German two-seat sports plane from 1932, with a low, cantilever wing, open cockpits and fixed undercarriage. Only one was built.

== Development ==
In the late 1920s and early 1930s, Willy Messerschmitt, working at Bayerische Flugzeugwerke (BFW) produced a series of low-wing sports monoplanes with either one or two seats. These were the M.19, M.23, M.27, M.31 and M.35 with the M.23 the only one with sales of much over double figures. The M, of course, stood for Messerschmitt.

Like the M.27, the M.31 had the same wingspan as the M.23c. Like the M.23b and M.27, it was a tandem two-seat open cockpit monoplane machine, with a low cantilever wing and braced tailplane. The fuselage below the decking was more rounded than on the earlier aircraft, being built out of two longitudinal panels per side rather than one, with the lower one angled inwards. The fixed undercarriage was without the spats of the M.27. It was powered by a neatly cowled radial engine driving the usual two-blade airscrew. Some considered it to be the most elegant of the series.

The first flight was in 1932, and it was on display at the German Aerosport exhibition of 1933. No orders were placed and only the prototype was built.

== Specifications ==
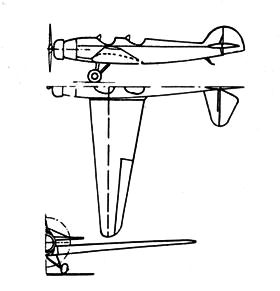
Messerschmitt M.31 3-view drawing from L'Aerophile December 1933

Data from Smith 1971, p. 32

General characteristics

- Crew: two
- Length: 7.85 m (25 ft 9 in)
- Wingspan: 12.00 m (39 ft 4.25 in)
- Height: 1.90 m (6 ft 2.25 in)
- Wing area: 17 m^{2} (183 sq ft)
- Empty weight: 335 kg (739 lb)
- Gross weight: 650 kg (1,433 lb)
- Powerplant: 1 × BMW Xa five cylinder radial , 45 kW (60 hp)

Performance

- Maximum speed: 170 km/h (106 mph, 92 kn)
- Range: 700 km (435 mi, 378 nmi)
- Service ceiling: 4,500 m (14,760 ft)
