= Messerschmitt M 28 =

M 28

General information
- Type: Mail plane
- National origin: Germany
- Manufacturer: Messerschmitt
- Number built: 1

History
- First flight: January 1931

The Messerschmitt M 28 was a mail plane developed in Germany in the early 1930s to meet a requirement by Deutsche Luft Hansa. It was a single-engine, low-wing cantilever monoplane of conventional design with an enclosed cockpit and fixed, tailskid undercarriage.

Despite successful trials, Luft Hansa changed its requirement and did not purchase the design, due possibly at least partly to the enmity of Luft Hansa director Erhard Milch towards Messerschmitt. This would be Messerschmitt's final attempt to market a commercial aircraft in Germany (the Messerschmitt M 36 was designed specifically for Romania), with the company subsequently returning to the production of sport aircraft instead.

== Specifications ==
General characteristics

- Crew: two
- Length: 10.00 m (32 ft 10 in)
- Wingspan: 15.50 m (50 ft 10 in)
- Height: 3.00 m (9 ft 10 in)
- Wing area: 25.6 m^{2} (275 sq ft)
- Empty weight: 1,480 kg (3,260 lb)
- Gross weight: 3,000 kg (6,600 lb)
- Powerplant: 1 × BMW-built Pratt & Whitney Hornet , 390 kW (525 hp)

Performance

- Maximum speed: 260 km/h (160 mph, 140 kn)
- Range: 2,450 km (1,530 mi, 1,330 nmi)
- Service ceiling: 5,200 m (17,000 ft)
