= BFW M.21 =

M.21
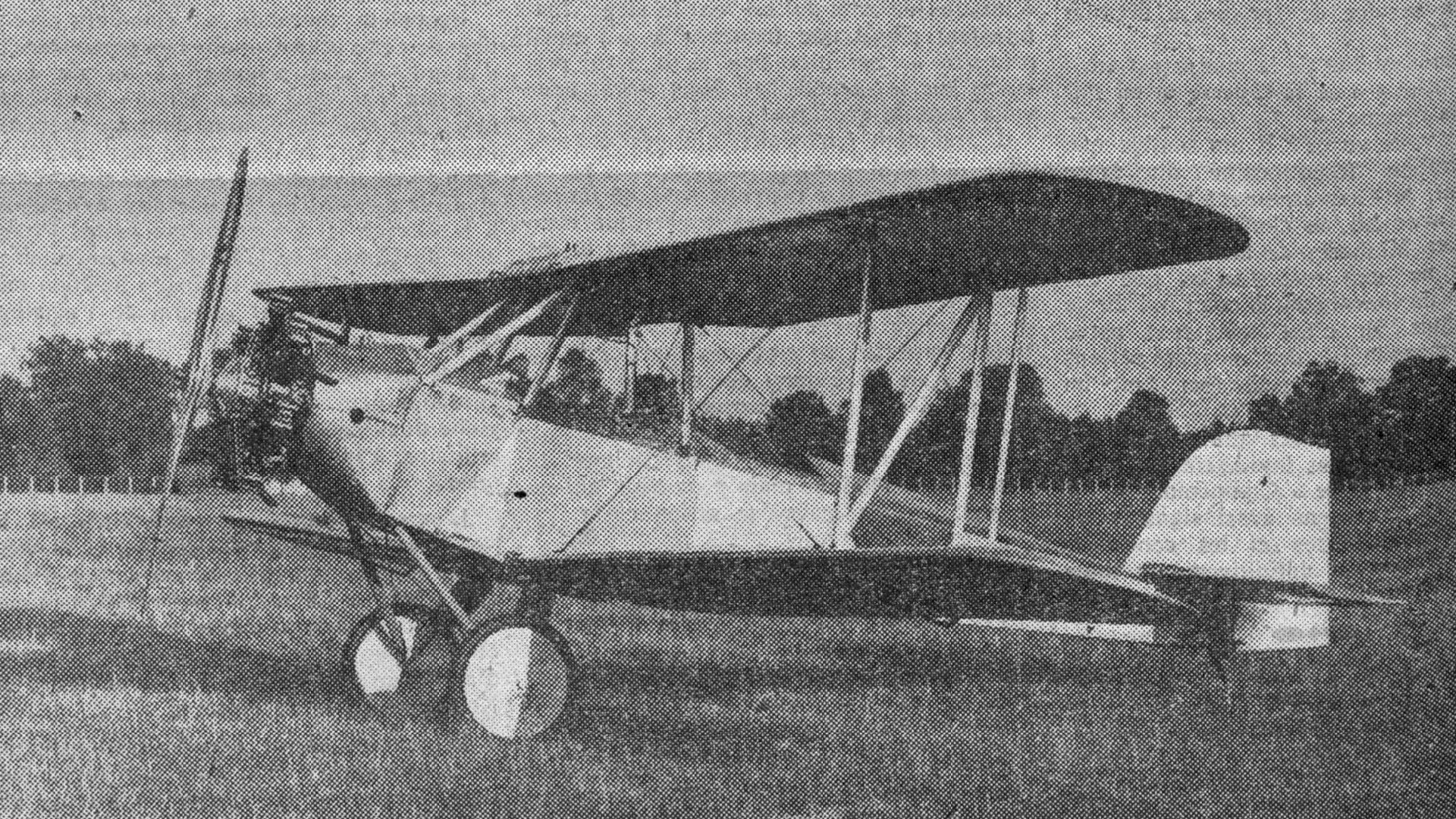

General information
- Type: Two-seat biplane trainer
- National origin: Germany
- Manufacturer: Bayerische Flugzeugwerke (BFW)
- Designer: Willy Messerschmitt
- Number built: 1

History
- First flight: 1928
- Retired: 1933

The BFW M.21 was a single-engined biplane trainer designed by Willy Messerschmitt for the German Ministry of Transport. It was one of only two biplanes Messerschmitt designed, neither reaching production.

== Design and development ==
During 1927, following the success of his M 18 airliner tried to gain funding from the Baverian government; because the latter were already subsiding BFW (Bayerische Flugzeug-Werke) they pressed for an arrangement whereby Willy Messerschmitt joined BFW on the understanding the company produced only his designs. During these negotiations, completed on 8 September 1927, the Ministry of Transport put pressure on Messerschmitt to produce military aircraft. This led to the only two biplanes Messerschmitt ever designed, the first of which was the BFW M.21, otherwise known as the Messerschmitt M 21.

It was a two-seat single-engined trainer of single bay biplane layout. The wings, which folded for transport had parallel chord, no sweep and very little stagger and there were ailerons on both planes. The upper wing had a rounded cut out for improved visibility from the rear cockpit; the forward cockpit was under the wing. The fuselage was square sided with triangular upper decking behind the open cockpits and it tapered to the rear, making the generous fin and rudder appear even more prominent. A conventional single axle plus tail skid undercarriage was fitted.

The M.21 was powered by an uncowled radial engine, either the 96 hp (72 kW) Siemens Sh 11 (M.21a) or the 125 hp (93 kW) Sh 12 (M.21b) driving a two-bladed propeller. It first flew in 1928 but was not accepted for production, so only one was built. This example, civil registered as D-1566 flew until 1933 with DVS GmbH, the German sport flying association.

== Specifications (M.21b) ==
Data from Smith 1971, p. 22

General characteristics

- Crew: 2
- Length: 7.30 m (23 ft 11.5 in)
- Wingspan: 10.00 m (32 ft 9.75 in)
- Height: 2.80 m (9 ft 2.25 in)
- Empty weight: 480 kg (1,058 lb)
- Gross weight: 740 kg (1,631 lb)
- Powerplant: 1 × Siemens-Halske Sh 12 7-cylinder air cooled radial , 93 kW (125 hp)

Performance

- Maximum speed: 156 km/h (97 mph, 84 kn)
- Range: 600 km (373 mi, 324 nmi)
