= Udet U 12 Flamingo =

1920s German aircraft

U 12 Flamingo
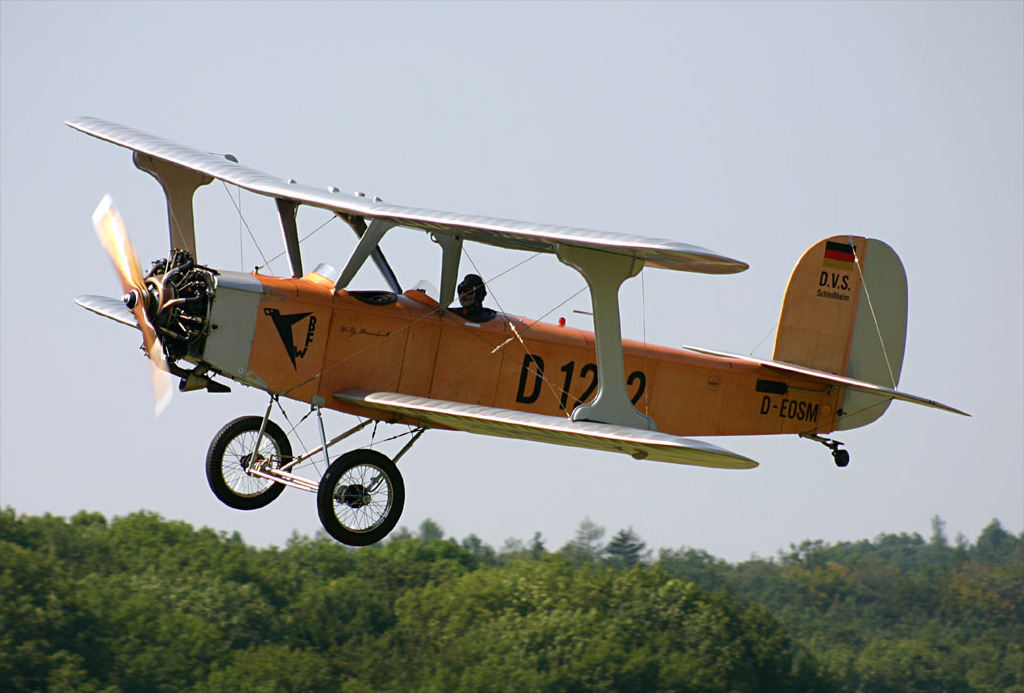
- D-EOSM of the Deutsches Museum, Munich, Germany. This replica has a Sh 14 engine, a later, more powerful version of the Siemens-Halske engines fitted to original U 12s.

General information
- Type: Civil trainer aircraft
- Manufacturer: Udet Flugzeugbau, BFW and others under licence
- Designer: Hans Herrmann
- Number built: ca. 300

History
- First flight: 1925

The Udet U 12 Flamingo was an aerobatic sports plane and trainer aircraft developed in Germany in the mid-1920s.

== Design and development ==
The U 12 was a conventional, single-bay biplane of wooden construction with the wings braced by large I-struts. The pilot and instructor or passenger sat in tandem, open cockpits. The U 12 proved extremely popular and sold well, due in no small part to Ernst Udet's spectacular aerobatics routines while flying the aircraft. One particularly acclaimed part of his act included swooping down towards the airfield and picking up a handkerchief with the tip of one wing. The popularity of this aircraft was insufficient to rescue Udet Flugzeugbau from its dire financial position, but when the company's assets were taken over by the state of Bavaria to form BFW, production of the U 12 soon resumed in earnest. BFW-built U 12s were exported to Austria, Hungary and Latvia, and later built under licence in these countries as well.

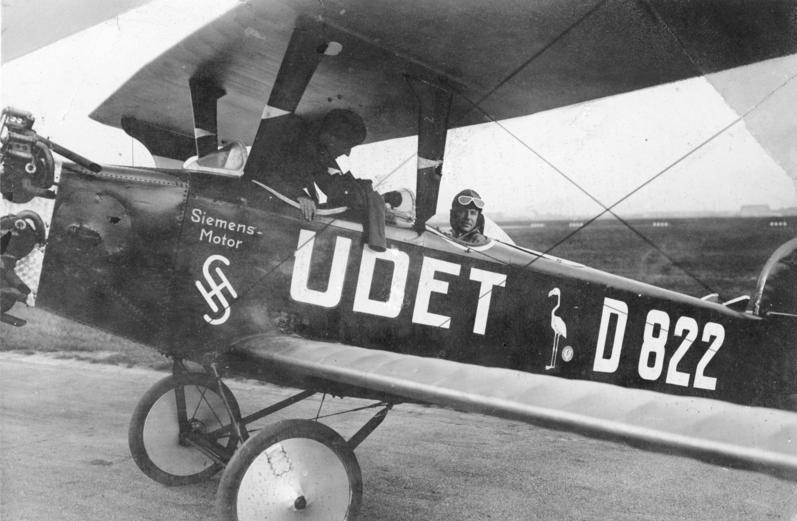
Udet in rear seat

== Variants ==
=== Germany ===
- U 12a: main production version with Siemens-Halske Sh 11 engine
  - U 12W: float-equipped U 12a (Wasser—"water")
- U 12b: version strengthened for aerobatics and with improved wing design
- U 12c: advanced trainer with reduced wing area
- U 12d: U 12b with Siemens-Halske Sh 12 engine
- U 12e: U 12c with Siemens-Halske Sh 12 engine

=== Austria ===
20 aircraft produced by Fliegerwerft Thalerhof

- U 12H: standard U 12a (Holz—"wood")
- U 12S: U 12a with redesigned fuselage of fabric-covered steel tube construction (Stahl—"steel").
  - U 12Ö: alternative designation for U 12S (Österreich—"Austria")

=== Hungary ===
Forty aircraft produced by KRG and another 40 by Manfred Weiss Works. Some examples armed and used for fighter or bomber training

- Hungária I: similar to U 12a with N-type interplane struts
- Hungária II: similar to U 12a with N-type interplane struts
- Hungária III: similar to U 12a with N-type interplane struts, propeller spinner and Townend ring
- Hungária IV: similar to U 12a. Only Hungarian-built version with I-type interplane struts
- Hungária V: similar to U 12a with N-type interplane struts

== Operators ==
Austria

- Austrian Air Force (1927–1938)

Hungary

- Royal Hungarian Air Force

Latvia

- Latvian Air Force

Turkey

- Turkish Air Force

== Surviving aircraft ==
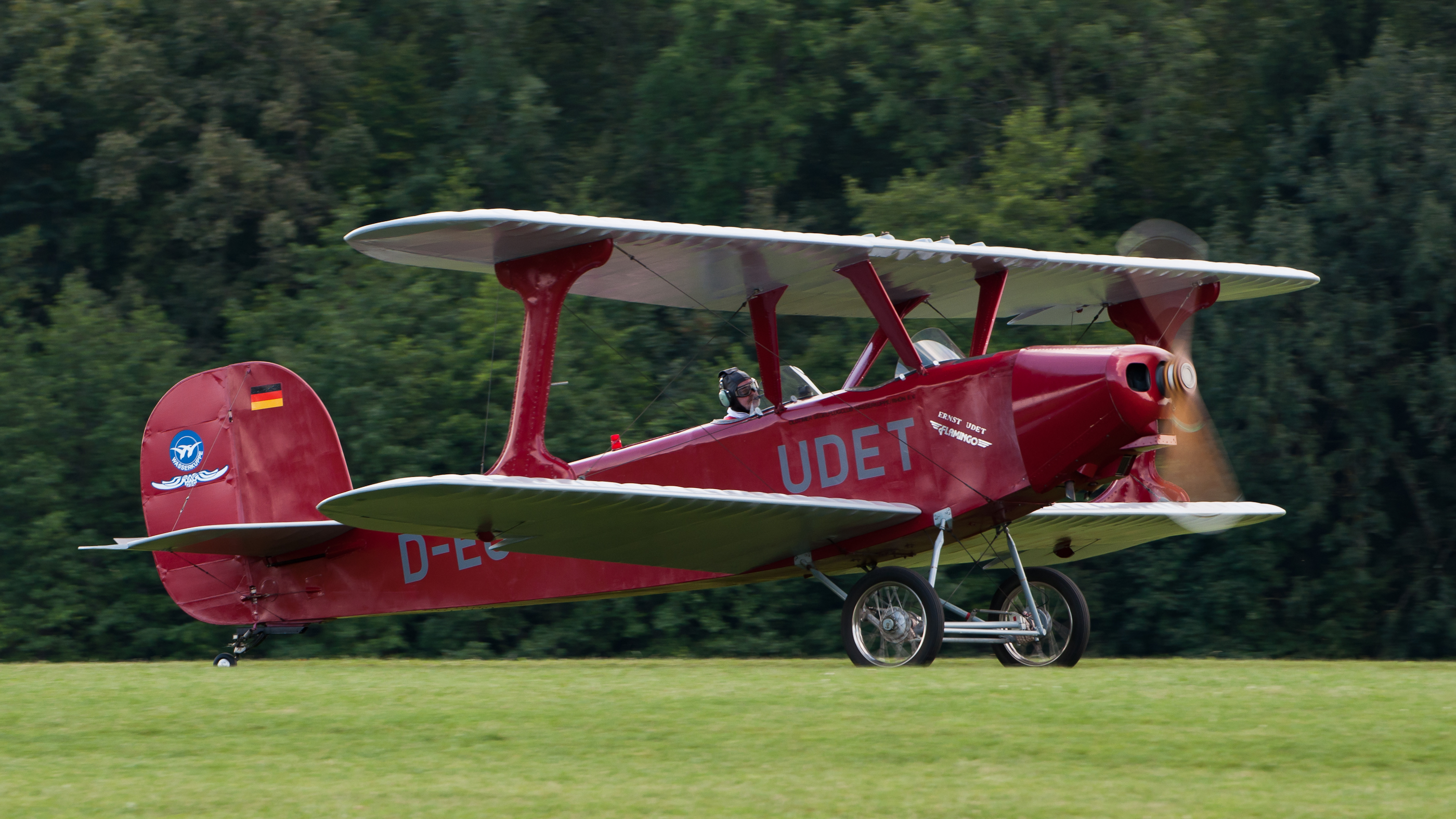
Udet Flamingo replica built in 1993

No original aircraft are known to exist. An airworthy replica was kept at the Deutsches Museum but crashed at the 2013 Tannkosh event.

== Specifications (U 12a) ==
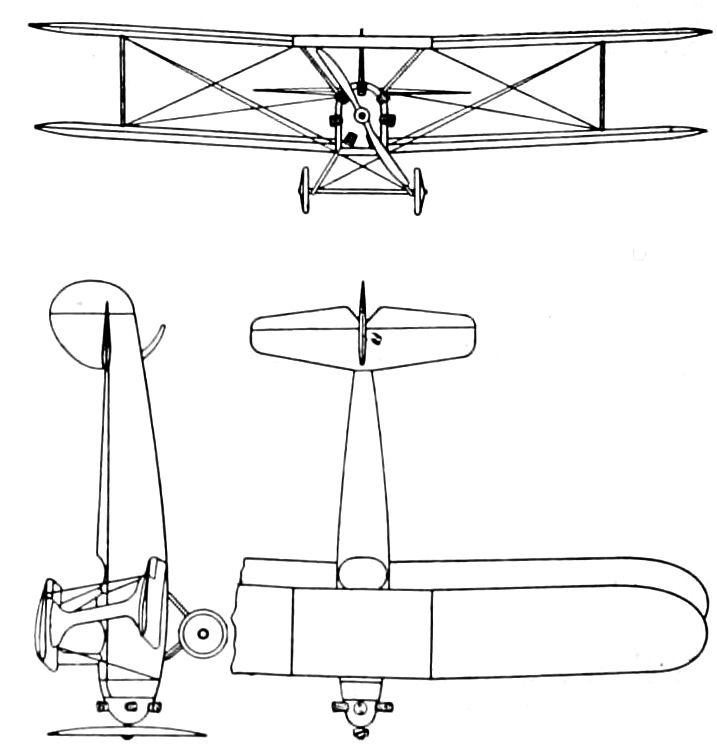
Udet U-12 Flamingo 3-view drawing from Aero Digest November 1927

General characteristics

- Crew: two, pilot and instructor
- Length: 7.4 m (24 ft 6 in)
- Wingspan: 10.0 m (32 ft 8 in)
- Height: 2.8 m (9 ft 2 in)
- Wing area: 24 m^{2} (258 sq ft)
- Empty weight: 525 kg (1,157 lb)
- Gross weight: 800 kg (1,764 lb)
- Powerplant: 1 × Siemens-Halske Sh 11 , 60 kW (80 hp)

Performance

- Maximum speed: 140 km/h (87 mph, 76 kn)
- Range: 450 km (280 mi, 240 nmi)
- Service ceiling: 3,700 m (12,100 ft)
- Rate of climb: 2.3 m/s (450 ft/min)
