= Messerschmitt P.1095 =

German multirole aircraft project

Me P.1095

General information
- Type: Planned fighter/ground-attacker/light bomber/reconnaissance aircraft
- National origin: Germany
- Manufacturer: Messerschmitt
- Status: Project
- Primary user: Luftwaffe

The Messerschmitt P.1095 was a German military aircraft designed by Rudolf Seitz (not the SS Officer) at the end of 1943. The aircraft used the wings, cockpit, and controls of the Me 262 and the tail surfaces and landing gear of the Me 309. The design was to have been powered by a turbojet engine located under the fuselage, and it was to have been armed with two nose-mounted MK 108 cannon.

== Variants ==
Two variants were proposed in early 1943. The former had wooden wings, while the latter had metal ones. Both had the same fuselage.

- First variant, using the tail section of the Me 262.
- Second variant, using the tail section of the Me 328 and a slightly smaller metal wing.

There was a third variant drawn in October 1943 with swept wings and other major design differences of which no reliable drawings have survived.

== Specifications (Messerschmitt P.1095) ==
Data from

General characteristics

- Length: 9.71 m (31 ft 10 in)
- Wingspan: 9.74 m (31 ft 11 in)
- Height: 3.38 m (11 ft 1 in)
- Powerplant: 1 × Junkers Jumo 004 turbojet, 10 kN (2,200 lbf) thrust

Performance

- Maximum speed: 860 km/h (530 mph, 460 kn)

Armament

- 2 × MK 108 cannons
