= Vera von Bissing =

German aviator (1906–2002)

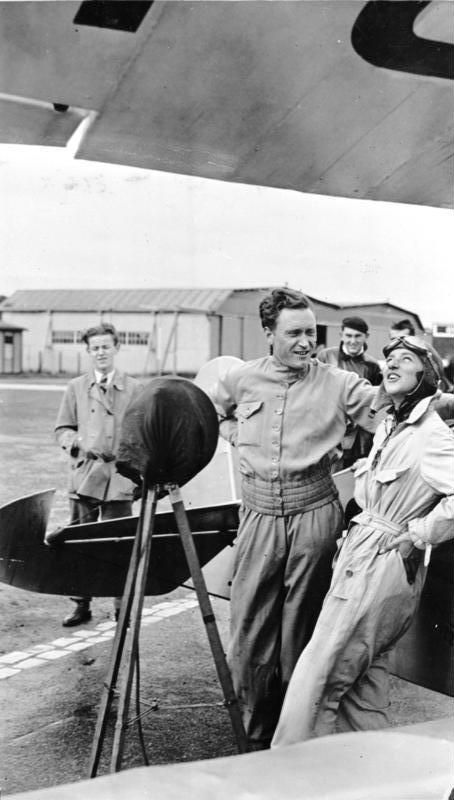
- Gerhard Fieseler and Vera von Bissing in Berlin-Tempelhof, 1931
- Born: October 23, 1906
- Died: June 15, 2002 (aged 95)
- Known for: Aerobatic pilot
- Awards: War Merit Cross
- Aviation career
- Flight license: 1930

Racing career
- Aircraft: Messerschmitt M35

Vera von Bissing (October 23, 1906 – June 15, 2002) was a German aerobatic pilot.

She earned her pilots license in 1930, and subsequently trained in aerobatics with Gerhard Fieseler. She began competing in aerobatic competitions - in 1932, von Bissing competed in an international aerobatics meeting in Zurich, Switzerland, where she was placed sixth. In 1936, she flew a Messerschmitt M35 at the World Aerobatic Championships' Olympic Celebration Competition, held alongside the 1936 Olympic Games in Berlin. She also participated in the women's event of the competition, held for the opening of the Rangsdorf airfield, and won. The following year, von Bissing competed in an international aviation event in Zürich. In 1939, she performed at an airshow in Eastbourne, England, where her execution of loops and half-rolls were described as "gems of precision".

During World War II, von Bissing was employed as the head of a regional repair yard of the National Socialist Flyers Corps Group 6, at Eschwege, with approximately 100 planes. After the war, von Bissing described her work as including test-flying all planes once repaired, arranging engineering supplies for the yard, distributing and checking parachutes, and managing a ferrying centre which ferried small aircraft from factories to the Luftwaffe supply parks. She commanded about 100 ferry pilots, all men, and ferried over 1,000 planes without an accident. In 1944 von Bissing was awarded the War Merit Cross for her services. In 1945, at the end of the war, she was arrested by the Allied forces, but released after a few days.

In 2010, a biography of von Bissing by Ernest Probst was published by GRIN Publishing.
