= Messerschmitt Bf 165 =

German bomber project

Bf 165

General information
- Type: Long-range bomber
- Manufacturer: Messerschmitt
- Status: project only
- Number built: 0 (one mockup)

The Messerschmitt Bf 165 was a German long-range bomber project. There is very little published about the Bf 165, but it is known that wind tunnel testing of the aircraft began in 1937. A full-scale mockup of the aircraft was constructed for display to the Reichsführer in 1937. The Bf 165 was designed to have a top speed of 600 km/h, a range of 6000 km, and a bombload of 1000kg.
