= BMW X (engine) =

1920s German aircraft piston engine

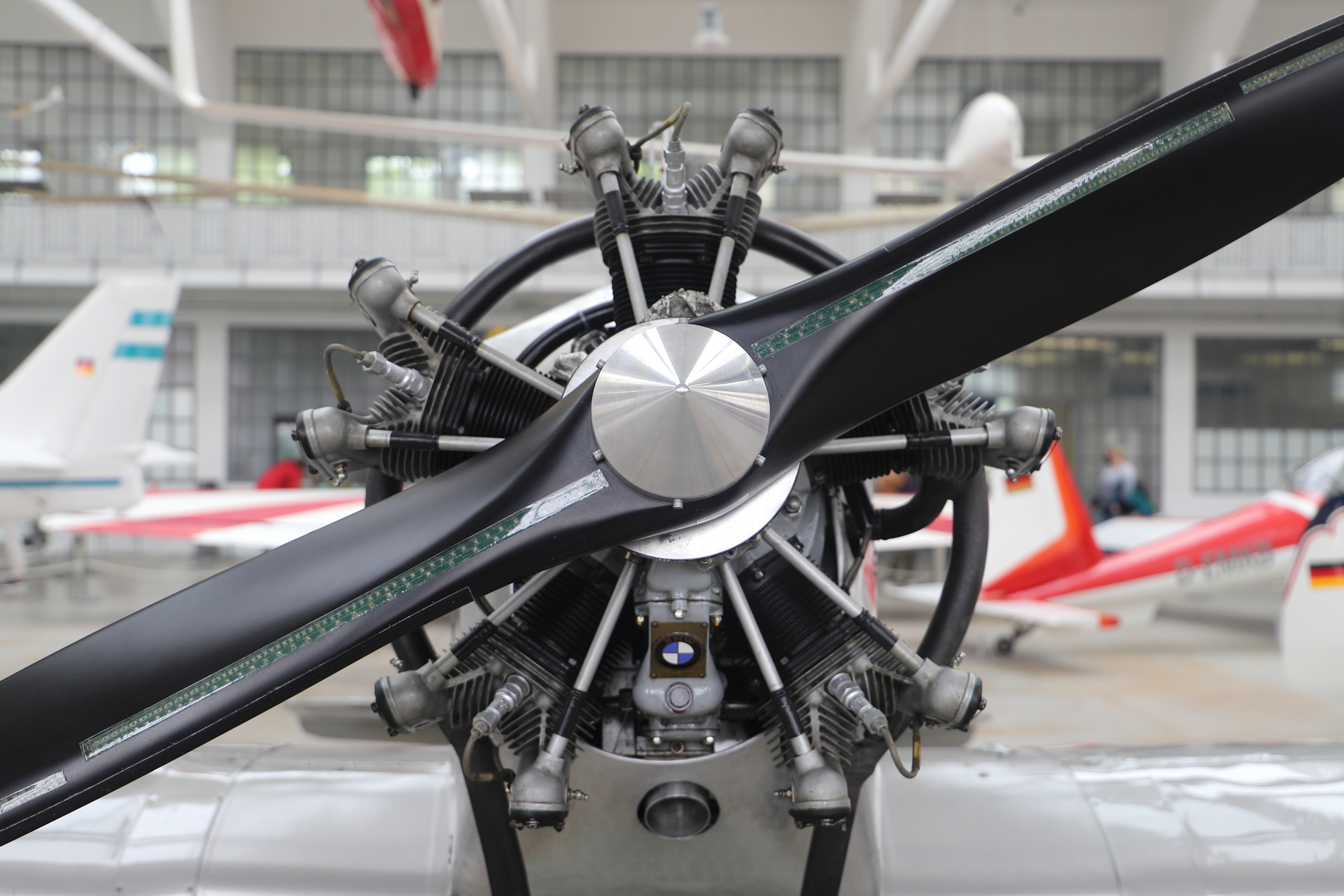
- BMW X at the Deutsches Museum Flugwerft Schleissheim
- Type: Radial engine
- Manufacturer: BMW
- First run: 1927

The BMW X is a small five-cylinder radial engine for sport and training aircraft. Although this engine proved successful at several large-scale events in 1930, including that year's round-Europe flight, only a few were built.

The successor model to the BMW X five-cylinder radial engine, the BMW Xa, was introduced in 1931, with the swept volume increased from 2.2 L (130 cu in) to 2.9 L (180 cu in). Power output went up from 37 to 51 kW (50 to 68 hp). The Xa was also not built in any quantity and was mainly installed in training and sport aircraft.

== Variants ==
X
Bore:83 mm (3.3 in), Stroke:80 mm (3.1 in)
Xa
Bore:90 mm (3.5 in), Stroke:92.5 mm (3.64 in)

== Applications ==
- BFW M.23
- BFW M.31
- Gerner G.IIR
- Klemm L25

== Specifications (BMW Xa) ==
Data from Flugzeug-Typenbuch. Handbuch der deutschen Luftfahrt- und Zubehör-Industrie 1944, and Jane's all the World's Aircraft 1931

=== General characteristics ===
- Type: 5 cylinder radial engine
- Bore: 90 mm (3.54 in)
- Stroke: 90 mm (3.5 in) / 92.5 mm (3.64 in) (slave rods / master rod)
- Displacement: 2.93 L (178.8 cu in) (assumes equal stroke for each cylinder)
- Length: 664 mm (26.1 in)
- Diameter: 738 mm (29.1 in)
- Dry weight: 73 kg (161 lb)

=== Components ===
- Valvetrain: 1x inlet and exhaust overhead valves per cylinder operated by pushrods and rockers
- Fuel system: Sum CFV 36 carburettor
- Fuel type: 73 Octane / 80 Octane
- Cooling system: Air cooled

=== Performance ===
- Power output:

- 68 PS (67 hp; 50 kW) at 2,300 rpm (15 minutes) at sea level
- 60 PS (59 hp; 44 kW) at 1,590 rpm (30 minutes) at sea level
- 54 PS (53 hp; 40 kW) at 1,980 rpm (max continuous) at sea level
- 40 PS (39 hp; 29 kW) at 1,980 rpm (max continuous) at 3,500 m (11,483 ft)

- Specific power: 23.2 PS/L (0.375 hp/cu in; 17.1 kW/L)
- Compression ratio: 5.7:1
- Specific fuel consumption: 0.24 kg/PSh (0.54 lb/(hp⋅h); 0.33 kg/kWh) at max continuous
- Oil consumption: 0.005 kg/PSh (0.011 lb/(hp⋅h); 0.0068 kg/kWh) at max continuous
- Power-to-weight ratio: 0.74 PS/kg (0.33 hp/lb; 0.54 kW/kg)
- B.M.E.P.: 8.4 atm (8.5 bar; 123 psi)

== See also ==
Comparable engines

- Armstrong Siddeley Genet
- Warner Scarab Junior

Related lists

- List of aircraft engines
