= Messerschmitt P.1092 =

German experimental aircraft project

Me P.1092
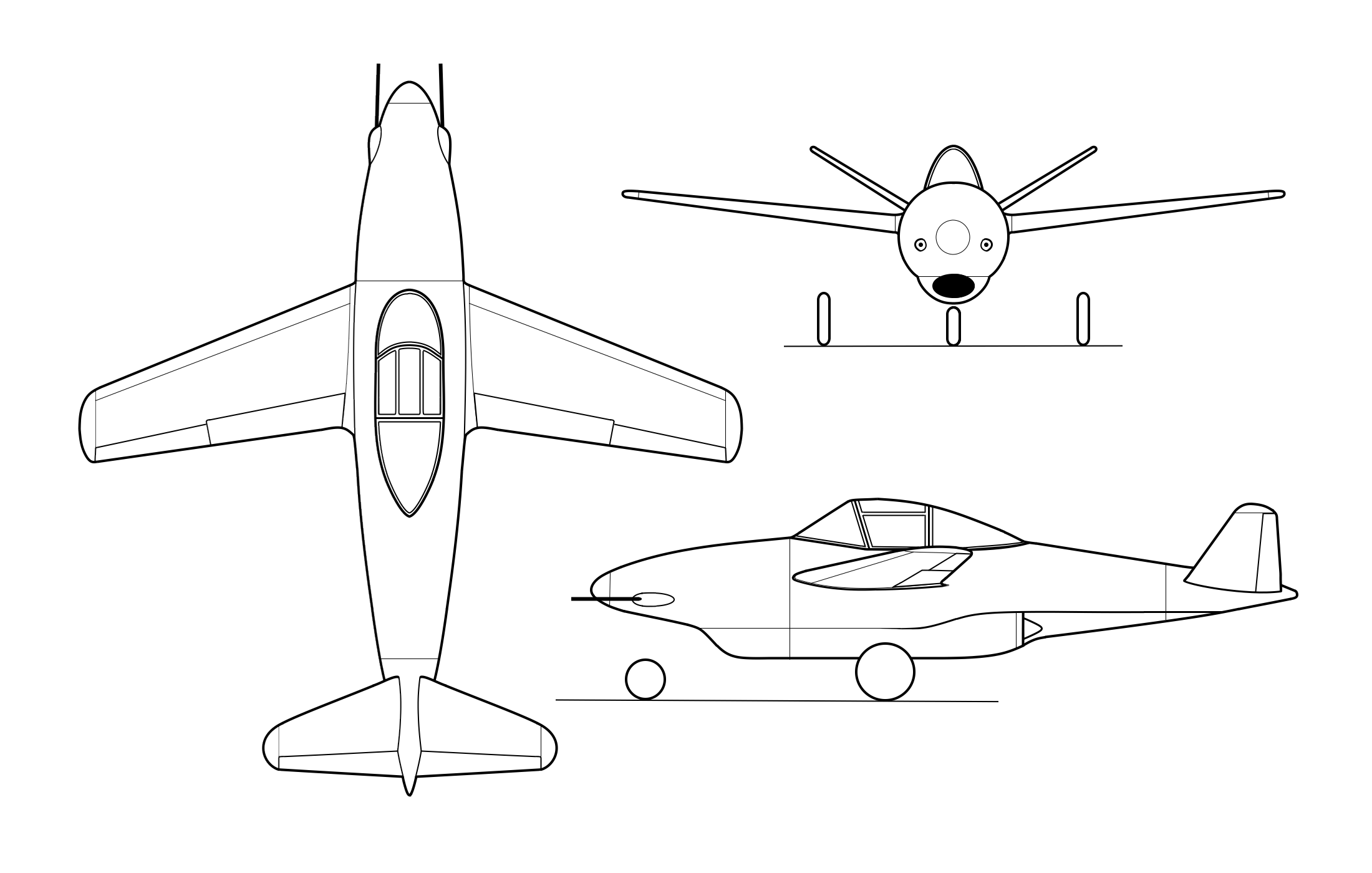
- P.1092 A

General information
- Type: Experimental aircraft
- Manufacturer: Messerschmitt
- Status: Project terminated owing to end of war
- Primary user: Luftwaffe
- Number built: None completed

The Messerschmitt P.1092 was a series of Messerschmitt experimental aircraft for the Luftwaffe during the Second World War. Several designs for single- and twin-engined aircraft were drafted under the same designation.

The different aircraft were all-metal monoplanes with retractable tricycle landing gear, swept wings, and a jet engine. A number of variants were drawn. The P.1092 remained a project, with no aircraft built.

== Variants ==
- Messerschmitt P.1092A
- Messerschmitt P.1092B-1
- Messerschmitt P.1092B-2
- Messerschmitt P.1092A-B
- Messerschmitt P.1092/2
- Messerschmitt P.1092/3
- Messerschmitt P.1092/4
- Messerschmitt P.1092/5

== Specifications (Messerschmitt P.1092 A) ==
General characteristics

- Length: 8.31 m (27 ft 3 in)
- Wingspan: 7.75 m (25 ft 5 in)
- Wing area: 12.7 m^{2} (137 sq ft)
- Empty weight: 2,027 kg (4,469 lb)
- Max takeoff weight: 3,664 kg (8,078 lb)
- Powerplant: 1 × Junkers Jumo 004 C turbojet, 10 kN (2,200 lbf) thrust

Performance

- Maximum speed: 890 km/h (550 mph, 480 kn)
- Range: 390 km (240 mi, 210 nmi)
- Service ceiling: 11,200 m (36,700 ft)

Armament

- 2 × MK 103 cannons, 2 × MG 151/15 cannons
