= Theodor Croneiss =

German flying ace

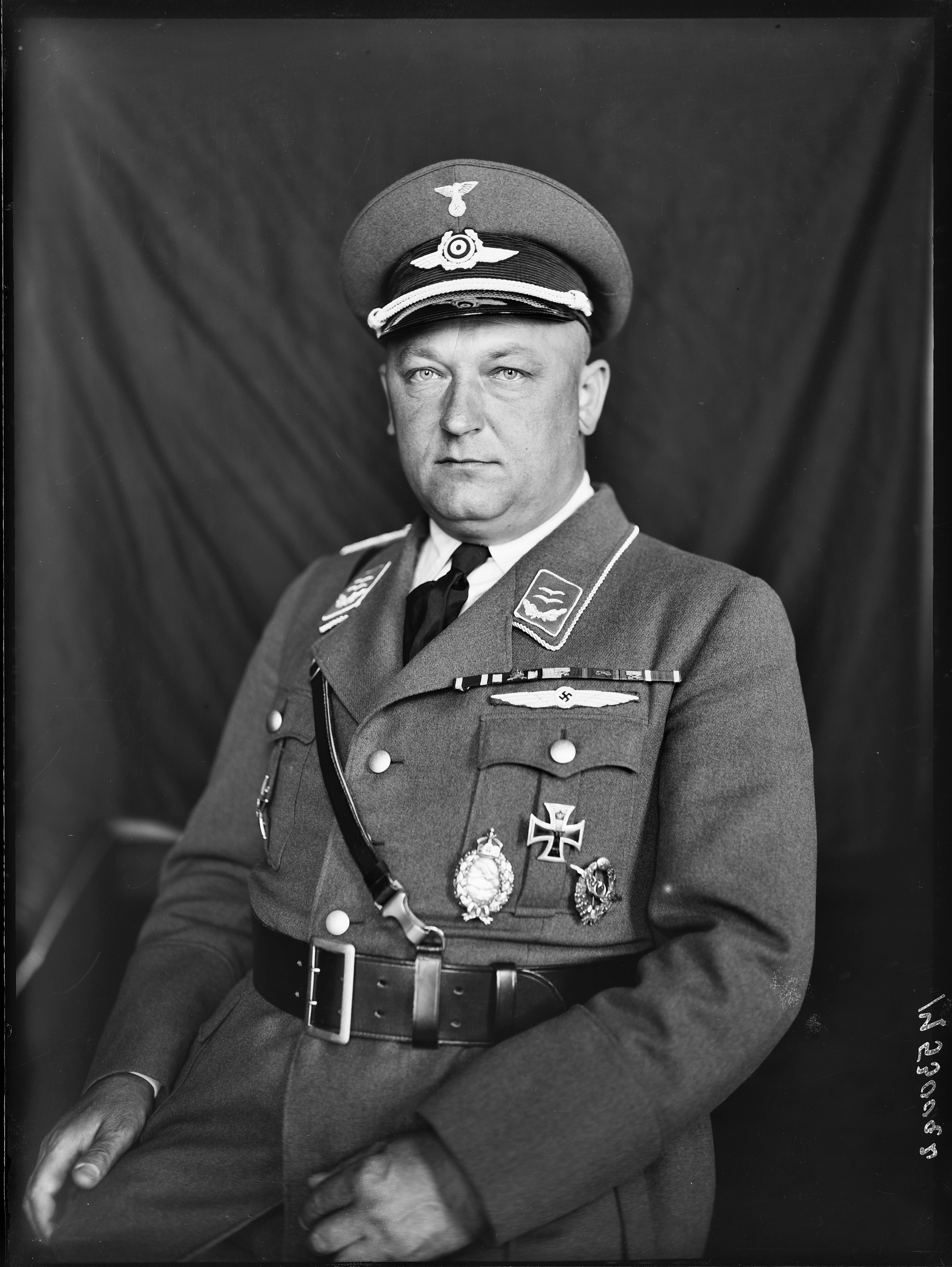
- Theodor Croneiss in Deutscher Luftsportverband Uniform ca. 1934
- Born: 18 December 1894
- Died: 7 November 1942 (aged 47)
- Military career
- Allegiance: Germany
- Branch: Flying service
- Service years: ca 1915 - 1918
- Rank: Oberleutnant
- Nickname: Theo
- Unit: Feldflieger Abteilung 6
- Awards: Iron Cross, House Order of Hohenzollern
- Other work: Test pilot for Messerschmitt

Oberleutnant Theodor Croneiss (18 December 1894 – 7 November 1942) was a World War I fighter pilot credited with five aerial victories.

== World War I service ==
Croneiss was one of the German pilots assigned to duty with Germany's allies, the Ottoman Empire. As such, he was assigned to Feldflieger Abteilung 6, which was also known as the Jasta Chanak Kale—Turkei as early as late 1915 or early 1916. His first aerial victory came on 7 January 1916, when he downed a Farman bomber over El Sedd-ul-Bahr. The next day, he downed a Royal Naval Air Service Voisin III LAS in the vicinity of Cape Helles. On 4 February 1916, his victory was over a reconnaissance two-seater at Baba-Tepe, off Imbros.

On 24 January 1918, Croneiss shot down a Sopwith over the Gulf of Saros. His fifth victory came on 23 May 1918, when he destroyed a Sopwith fighter. He was subsequently decorated with the Iron Cross First Class and the Knight's Cross of the House Order of Hohenzollern in August 1918.

== Post World War I ==
Having survived the war as an Oberleutnant, Croneiss became a sporting aviator. He became director of a flying club that sponsored Willy Messerschmitt. Croneiss piloted one of Messerschmitt's early designs, the M-21, to win the designer a 60,000 Reichsmark prize. In 1928–1929, Croneiss won the East Prussia Flying Trophy with the M-23 model. He later evolved into a test pilot for the Messerschmitt Company.

Theodor Jacob Croneiss died on 7 November 1942.

== Awards and decorations ==
- Iron Cross of 1914, 2nd class (2 January 1915) and 1st class (26 September 1916)
- Knight's Cross of the Royal House Order of Hohenzollern with Swords (6 August 1918)
- War Merit Cross, 2nd class (1942)
- Liyakat Medal
- Imtiyaz Medal
- Order of the Medjidieh
- Ottoman War Medal (Turkish: Harp Madalyası), "Gallipoli Star" or "Iron Crescent"
