= Messerschmitt =

German aircraft manufacturer, 1938 to 1968

Messerschmitt AG
- Company type: AG, subsequently GmbH
- Industry: Aerospace
- Founded: 1938
- Defunct: 1968
- Fate: Merged
- Successor: Messerschmitt-Bölkow GmbH (1968); Messerschmitt-Bölkow-Blohm (1969)
- Headquarters: Augsburg, Germany
- Key people: Willy Messerschmitt; Woldemar Voigt
- Products: Commercial airliners; Military aircraft

Messerschmitt AG (German pronunciation: [ˈmɛsɐʃmɪt]) was a German share-ownership limited, aircraft manufacturing corporation named after its chief designer Willy Messerschmitt from mid-July 1938 onwards, and known primarily for its World War II fighter aircraft, in particular the Bf 109 and Me 262. The company survived in the post-war era, undergoing a number of mergers and changing its name from Messerschmitt to Messerschmitt-Bölkow-Blohm before being bought by Deutsche Aerospace (DASA, now part of Airbus) in 1989.

== History ==
=== Background ===
In February 1916, the south German engineering company MAN AG and several banks purchased the unprofitable aircraft builder Otto-Flugzeugwerke, starting a new company, Bayerische Flugzeugwerke AG (abbreviated B.F.W., and meaning approximately "Bavarian Aircraft Factory"). The articles of association were drawn up on 19 and 20 February, and completed on 2 March 1916. Details of the company were recorded in the Commercial Register with an equity capital of RM 1,000,000 on 7 March 1916. 36% of the capital was provided by the Bank für Handel und Industrie, Berlin, 30% by MAN AG and 34% by Hermann Bachstein, Berlin. The first chairman of the Board of Management was Peter Eberwein, who had previously been employed at Albatros Flugzeugwerke.

Due to the need for immediate aircraft production for the ongoing war, there was no time for development work and BFW manufactured aircraft under licence from Albatros Flugzeugwerke. Within a month of being set up, the company was able to supply aircraft to the war ministries of Prussia and Bavaria. However, major quality problems were encountered at the start. The German air crews frequently complained about the serious defects that appeared in the first machines from BFW. The same thing had happened with the aircraft from the predecessor company run by Gustav Otto. It was only organizational changes and more intensive supervision of the assembly line that succeeded in resolving these problems by the end of 1916. BFW then started turning out over 200 aircraft a month, with their workforce growing to 3,000 and becoming one of the largest aircraft manufacturers in Bavaria.

The end of the war hit BFW hard, since military demand for aircraft collapsed. The company's management were forced to look for new products with which to maintain their position in the market. Since World War I aircraft were largely built from wood to keep their weight down, BFW was equipped with the very latest joinery plant. The company still held stocks of materials sufficient for about 200 aircraft, and worth 4.7 million reichsmarks. The machinery and the materials were then used for the production of furniture and fitted kitchens. In addition, from 1921 onwards, the company manufactured motorcycles of its own design under the names of Flink and Helios.

In the autumn of 1921, Austrian financier Camillo Castiglioni first announced his interest in purchasing BFW. While most of the shareholders accepted his offer, MAN AG initially held on to its shareholding in BFW, but Castiglioni wanted to acquire all the shares. He was supported in this by BMW's Managing Director Franz Josef Popp who, in a letter to the chairman of MAN, described BFW as a "dead factory, which possesses no plant worth mentioning, and consists very largely of dilapidated and unsuitable wooden sheds situated in a town that is extremely unfavorable for industrial activities and whose status continues to give little cause for enthusiasm". Apparently Popp was still in close contact with Castiglioni and was perhaps even privy to the latter's plans for merging BMW with BFW. It was probably in the spring of 1922 that Castiglioni and Popp persuaded MAN to give up its shares in BFW, so that now the company belonged exclusively to Castiglioni. Then, in May of the same year, when the Italian-born investor was able to acquire BMW's engine business from Knorr-Bremse AG, nothing more stood in the way of a merger between the aircraft company BFW and the engine builders BMW.

=== Reestablishment ===
Bayerische Flugzeugwerke (BFW/Bavarian Aircraft Works) was reformed in 1926, in Augsburg, Bavaria, when Udet Flugzeugbau GmbH was changed into a joint-stock company. In the early stages, BMW AG held a stake in this company and was represented by Josef Popp, who held a place on the supervisory board.

Willy Messerschmitt joined the company in 1927 as chief designer and engineer and formed a design team.

One of the first designs, the Messerschmitt M20, was a near-catastrophe for the designer and the company. Many of the prototypes crashed, one of them killing Hans Hackmack, a close friend of Erhard Milch, the head of Deutsche Luft Hansa and the German civil aviation authorities. Milch was upset by the lack of response from Messerschmitt and this led to a lifelong hatred towards him. Milch eventually cancelled all contracts with Messerschmitt and forced BFW into bankruptcy in 1931. However, Messerschmitt's friendship with Hugo Junkers prevented a stagnation of the careers of him and BFW, which was started again in 1933. Milch still prevented Messerschmitt's takeover of the BFW until 1938, hence the designation "Bf" of early Messerschmitt designs.

Messerschmitt promoted a concept he called "light weight construction" in which many typically separate load-bearing parts were merged into a single reinforced firewall, thereby saving weight and improving performance. The first true test of the concept was in the Bf 108 Taifun sports aircraft, which would soon be setting all sorts of records. Based on this performance the company was invited to submit a design for the Luftwaffe's 1935 fighter contest, winning it with the Bf 109, based on the same construction methods.

From this point on Messerschmitt became a favorite of the Nazi party, as much for his designs as his political abilities and the factory location in southern Germany away from the "clumping" of aviation firms on the northern coast. BFW was reconstituted as "Messerschmitt AG" on 11 July 1938, with Willy Messerschmitt as chairman and managing director. The renaming of BFW resulted in the company's RLM designation prefix changing from "Bf" to "Me" for all newer designs that were accepted by the RLM after the acquisition date. Existing types, such as the Bf 109 and 110, retained their earlier designation in official documents, although sometimes the newer designations were used as well, most often by subcontractors, such as Erla Maschinenwerk of Leipzig. In practice, all BFW/Messerschmitt aircraft from the Bf 108 four-seat touring monoplane, to the Bf 163 light observation aircraft (which competed unsuccessfully for the government contract won by the rival Fieseler Fi 156 design) were prefixed "Bf", all later types with "Me".

=== World War II ===
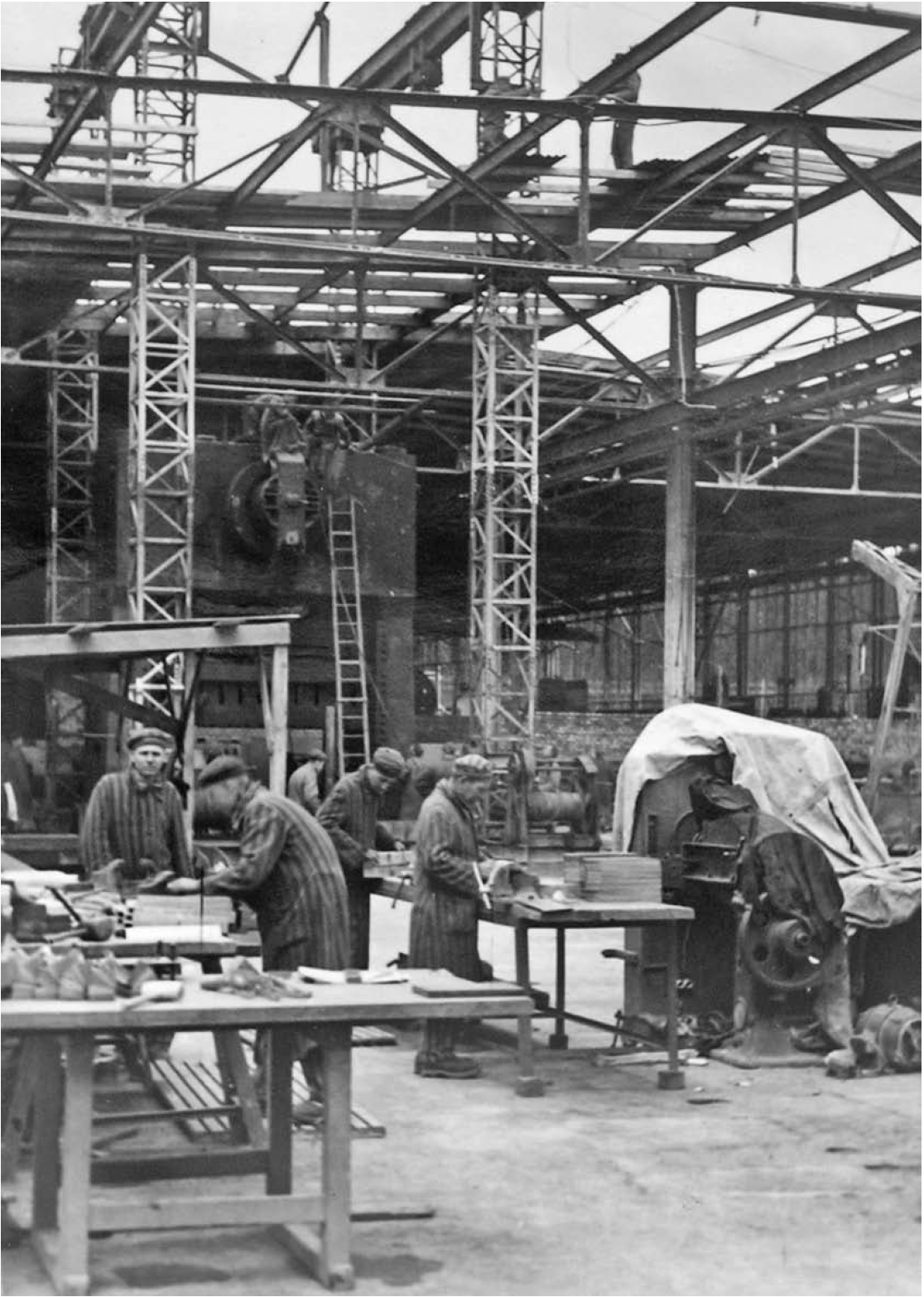
Concentration camp prisoners at Messerschmitt factory, c. 1943

During the war Messerschmitt became a major design supplier, their Bf 109 and Bf 110 forming the vast majority of fighter strength for the first half of the war. Several other designs were also ordered, including the enormous Me 321 Gigant transport glider, and its six-engined follow on, the Me 323. However, for the second half of the war, Messerschmitt turned almost entirely to jet-powered designs, producing the world's first operational jet fighter, the Me 262 Schwalbe ("Swallow"). They also produced the DFS-designed Me 163 Komet, the first rocket-powered design to enter service. Messerschmitt relied heavily on slave labour to produce much of the parts needed for these aircraft during the second half of World War II; these parts were assembled in an enormous tunnel system in Sankt Georgen an der Gusen, Austria. Slave labour was provided by inmates of the brutal KZ Gusen I and Gusen II camps, and by inmates from nearby Mauthausen concentration camp, all located near the St. Georgen quarries. 40,000 inmates from Spain, Italy, Poland, Slovenia, France, Russia, Hungarian Jews and twenty other nationalities were murdered during the production of these aircraft at KZ Gusen. Messerschmitt officials maintained barracks at the concentration camp to oversee the work being done by the inmates. Messerschmitt, and its executive Willy Messerschmitt also occupied the famed Villa Tugendhat in Brno, Czech Republic, designed by Mies van der Rohe and Lilly Reich in the 1920s; the Messerschmitt aircraft factory office and the Gestapo occupied the property during the war.

Messerschmitt had its share of poor designs as well; the Me 210, designed as a follow-on to the 110, was an aerodynamic disaster that almost led to the forced dissolution of the company. The design problems were eventually addressed in the Me 410 Hornisse, but only small numbers were built before all attention turned to the 262. Later in the war, in competition with the Junkers Ju 390 and the unbuilt, February 1943-initiated Heinkel He 277, Messerschmitt also worked on a heavy Amerika Bomber design, the Me 264, which flew in prototype form — with three prototype airframes built, the first of which flew in December 1942 — but was too late to see combat.

=== Post-war ===
For ten years after World War II, the company was not allowed to produce aircraft. One alternative the company came up with was the three-wheeled motorcycle/bubble car or Kabinenroller (cabinscooter) KR175 / KR200, designed by an aircraft engineer, Fritz Fend.

The cars were actually made by Fend's own company in the Messerschmitt works at Regensburg, and Willy Messerschmitt had very little to do with the vehicles other than ruling that they carried his name. Production of the KR200 ceased in 1964.

The Messerschmitt factory also produced prefabricated houses, which were designed as "self-building-kits" mainly based on an alloy framework.

==== Return to aviation ====
On 6 June 1968, Messerschmitt AG merged with the small civil engineering and civil aviation firm Bölkow, becoming Messerschmitt-Bölkow. The following May, the firm acquired Hamburger Flugzeugbau (HFB). The company then changed its name to Messerschmitt-Bölkow-Blohm (MBB). In 1989 MBB was taken over by DASA. DASA later operated as "EADS Germany", which is now Airbus.

== Aircraft ==
Model	Name	First flight	Remarks
M17		January 1925	sports aircraft
M18		1926	passenger transport
M19		1927	sports aircraft
M20		1928	passenger transport
M21		1928	prototype biplane trainer
M22		1928	prototype biplane medium bomber
M23		early 1928	sports aircraft
M24		1929	passenger transport
M25		not built	sports aircraft
M26		1930	prototype light aircraft
M27		1930	sports aircraft
M28		January 1931	prototype mail-plane
M29		1932	sports/racing aircraft
M31		1932	sports aircraft
M33		not built	ultra-light parasol-wing single-seat monoplane
M35		1933	sports aircraft developed from M23
M36		1934	passenger transport
Bf 108	Taifun (Typhoon)	1934	trainer & transport
Bf 109		September 1935	fighter, bomber interceptor; later versions sometimes mistakenly marked as "Me 109" on subcontractor's dataplates
Bf 110		12 May 1936	twin-engine heavy fighter, night fighter
Me 155		not built	high-altitude fighter, developed from Bf 109; not built, project transferred to Blohm + Voss as the Bv 155
Bf 161		1938	reconnaissance aircraft; prototype
Bf 162	Jaguar	1937	schnellbomber (fast bomber) based on Bf 110
Bf 163		19 February 1938	STOL reconnaissance aircraft; prototype built by Weserflug AG, lost military contract to Fieseler Fi 156 Storch
Me 163	Komet (Comet)	early 1941	rocket-powered interceptor
Bf 165		1937	long-range bomber project
Me 208			improved and enlarged version of Bf 108
Me 209		1 August 1938	designed to break world air speed record; attempted fighter conversion failed
Me 209-II		1943	fighter; update to Bf 109, never produced
Me 210		September 1939	twin-engine heavy fighter; also used for reconnaissance
Me 261	Adolfine	1941	designed as long-range record-setter; three built and used for reconnaissance
Me 262	Schwalbe (Swallow)	18 July 1942	twin-engine fighter & attack aircraft; first operational jet-powered fighter
Me 263		never flown	rocket-powered interceptor; advanced development of Me 163
Me 264	Amerikabomber (America Bomber)	23 October 1942	strategic bomber, developed under Amerika Bomber program in competition against Ju 390 and unbuilt He 277
Me 265		not built	attack aircraft, proposed
Me 309		July 1942	fighter; advanced but underperforming design meant to replace Bf 109
Me 310			1 built, pressurized Me 210 development, proposed
Me 321		7 March 1941	large transport glider
Me 323	Gigant (Giant)	Fall 1941	large transport aircraft; powered development of Me 321
Me 328		Fall 1943	pulsejet-powered selbstopfer or parasite fighter
Me 329		not built	heavy fighter-bomber; unpowered glider only
Me 334			tailless fighter, similar to Me 163 (development abandoned)
Me 362			3-turbojet passenger aircraft (development abandoned)
Me 409			High-altitude fighter project; evolved into Bv 155
Me 410	Hornisse (Hornet)	1943	twin-engine heavy fighter and fast bomber; development of Me 210
Me 509		not built	fighter, based on Me 309, with engine located behind cockpit as in P-39 Airacobra
Me 510			twin-engine fighter-bomber (not built)
Me 609			heavy fighter; combined two Me 309 fuselages into one airframe, as with Bf 109Z and Me 409 (development abandoned)
P.08-01		not flown	1941 flying wing strategic bomber project
P.1079		not flown	1939 long-range pusher bomber design
P.1092		not flown	prototype
P.1095		not flown	prototype multi-role aircraft
P.1099		not flown	prototype multi-role aircraft, intended improvement of Me 262
P.1100		not flown	tactical bomber design
P.1101		not flown	prototype swing-wing jet interceptor; later inspired Bell X-5
P.1102		not flown	swing wing bomber/heavy fighter
P.1103		not flown	rocket-powered interceptor
P.1104		not flown	rocket-powered interceptor
P.1106		not flown	intended improvement of P.1101
P.1107		not flown	jet bomber design
P.1109		not flown	oblique wing fighter design
P.1110		not flown	high altitude interceptor prototype
P.1111		not flown	fighter/interceptor prototype
P.1112		not flown	prototype tailless jet fighter; later inspired Vought F7U Cutlass

=== Other types of aircraft ===
- Messerschmitt Me 109TL

== Missiles ==
- Enzian

== Microcars ==
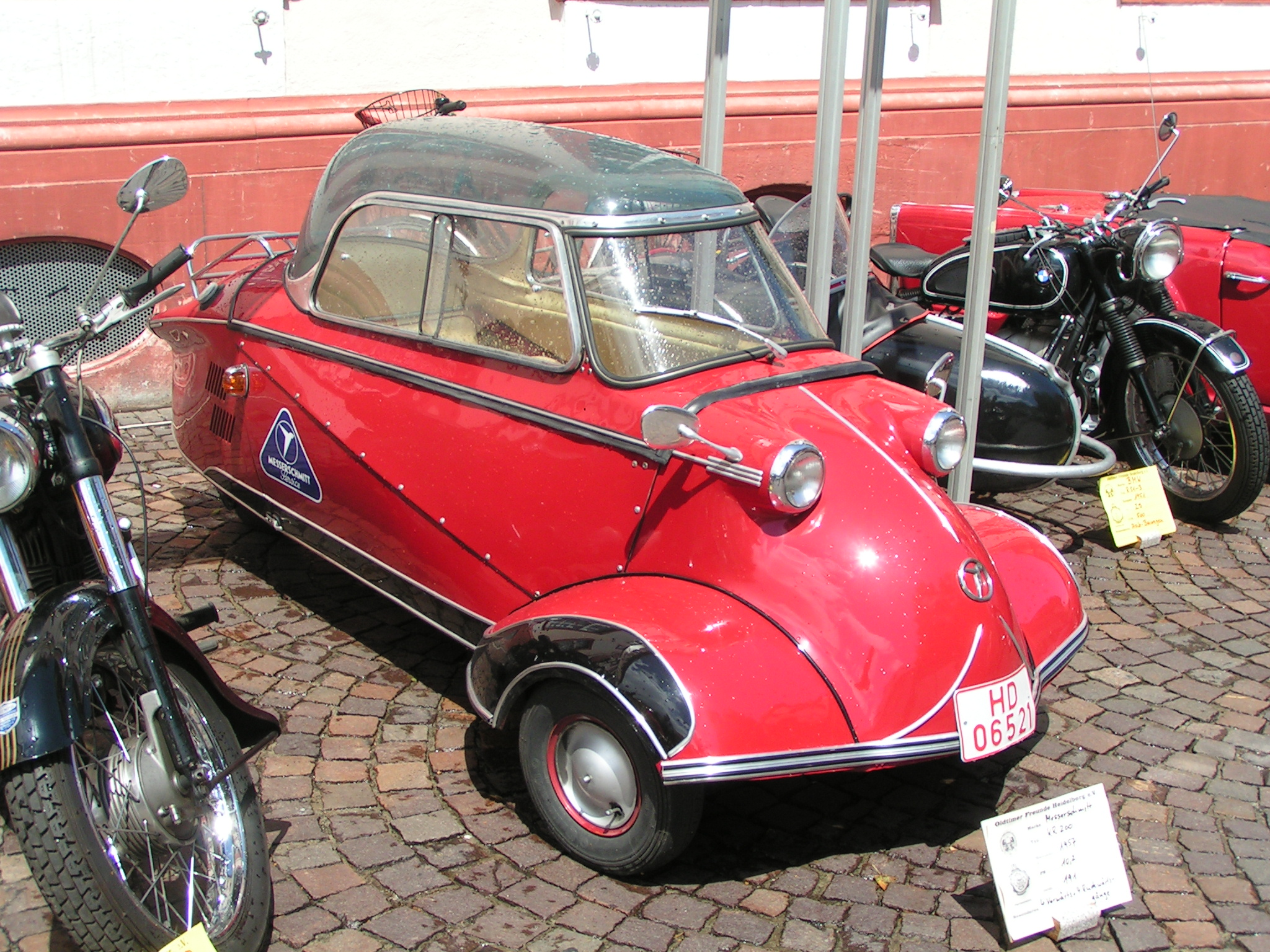
Messerschmitt KR200

- KR175
- KR200

== See also ==
- FMR Tg500
- List of RLM aircraft designations
- Messerschmitt-Bölkow-Blohm
