= BFW M.35 =

Sportplane by Willy Messerschmitt

M 35
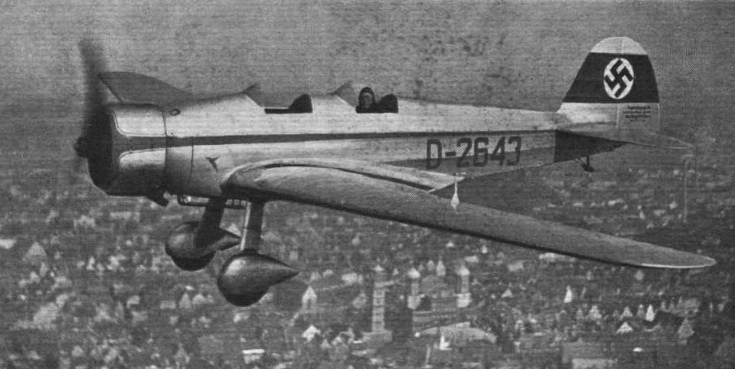

General information
- Type: Two-seat sports plane
- National origin: Germany
- Manufacturer: Bayerische Flugzeugwerke (BFW)
- Designer: Willy Messerschmitt
- Number built: 15

History
- Introduction date: 1934
- First flight: 1933
- Developed from: M.23

The BFW M.35, sometimes known as the Messerschmitt M 35, was a German sports plane of the early 1930s. It was the last of a line designed by Willy Messerschmitt.

== Development ==
During the period of 1927–33, Messerschmitt designed a series of six sport planes, the single-seat M.17 and M.19, and the two-seat M.23, M.27 M.31, and finally the M.35. With the exception of the M.23, none sold in large numbers. They were all single-engine low-wing cantilever monoplanes with open cockpits and fixed undercarriage. The M.35 kept the extended fuselage of the M.27 and combined it with an undercarriage of single leg, spatted form.

Two different engines were used. The M35a had a 112 kW (150 hp), seven-cylinder radial Siemens Sh 14a, and the M.35b a 100 kW (135 hp) four-cylinder inline inverted air-cooled Argus As 8b. The former was the shorter and faster of the two. The aircraft first flew in 1933.

== Operational history ==
The aircraft was first shown to the public and potential buyers at the 1934 Aerosalon in Geneva. In that year, Rudolf Hess won the Zugspitz trophy in a M.35. In 1934–1935, Wilhelm Stör won the German Aerobatic Championship in a M.35b, and in 1935 the women's prize was taken by Vera von Bissing in a similar machine. Stör can be seen flying an M.35 in daring acrobatic maneuvers during the 1935 German film Wunder des Fliegens (Miracle of Flight).

Despite these successes and strong performances at other venues in the late 1930s, only 15 M.35s were built, 13 registered in Germany, one in Spain and reputedly one in Romania. Though the M.35a was faster, the M.35b was commoner; only two M.35as are definitely identified.

== Operators ==
Spain

- Spanish Republican Air Force

== Specifications (M.35a) ==
Data from Smith 1971, p. 34

General characteristics

- Crew: two
- Length: 7.48 m (24 ft 6 in)
- Wingspan: 11.57 m (37 ft 11.33 in)
- Height: 2.75 m (9 ft 0 in)
- Wing area: 17.0 m^{2} (183 sq ft)
- Empty weight: 500 kg (1,102 lb)
- Gross weight: 800 kg (1,764 lb)
- Powerplant: 1 × Siemens Sh 14a 7-cylinder radial , 110 kW (150 hp)

Performance

- Maximum speed: 230 km/h (143 mph, 124 kn)
- Cruise speed: 195 km/h (122 mph, 106 kn)
- Range: 700 km (435 mi, 378 nmi)
- Service ceiling: 5,800 m (19,000 ft)
- Rate of climb: 5.05 m/s (994 ft/min) to 1,000 m (3,200 ft)

== See also ==
Related lists

- List of aircraft of the Spanish Republican Air Force
