= Siemens-Halske Sh 11 =

Type of engine

Sh 11
- Type: Radial engine
- Manufacturer: Siemens-Halske
- First run: 1925

The Siemens-Halske Sh 11 was a seven-cylinder, air-cooled, radial engine for aircraft built in Germany in the 1920s. First run in 1925, it was rated at 75 kW (100 hp).

== Applications ==
- Albatros L 68
- Bach 3-CT-2 Air Yacht
- Bach 3-CT-3 Air Yacht
- Bach 3-CT-4 Air Yacht
- BFW M.26
- LFG V 40
- Messerschmitt M 21
- Messerschmitt M 26
- Raab-Katzenstein Kl. 1 Schwalbe
- Udet U 12
