= BFW M.19 =

Aeroplane

General information
- Type: single seat sports
- National origin: Germany
- Manufacturer: Bayerische Flugzeugwerke (BFW)
- Designer: Willy Messerschmitt
- Number built: 2

History
- First flight: 1927

The BFW M.19, sometimes known as the Messerschmitt M 19, was the first in a line of German low-wing single-engine sports planes, designed by Willy Messerschmitt while he worked for Bayerische Flugzeugwerke (BFW).

== Development ==
The M.19 was developed to compete in the Sachsenflug competition for single-seat lightplanes, to requirements set down by the Deutsche Versuchsanstalt für Luftfahrt (DVL). It was Messerschmitt's first low-wing cantilever monoplane, though the fuselage and empennage were clearly related to that of the high-wing two-seat M.17 of 1925. This fuselage had five main longitudinal members, four defining the lower rectangular part and a raised, central dorsal member that made the upper cross-section triangular. These members tapered strongly together towards the tail unit, where the fuselage was very slim. The rudder and fin assembly wae noticeable for being extremely rectangular, higher than wide and dominated by the rudder; the fin chord was very narrow and amounted to little more than a streamlined rudder post. It had a single-axle undercarriage with a tailskid.

It was powered by an 18 kW (24 hp) ABC Scorpion engine.

== Operational history ==
The M.19 was entered into the Sachsenflug competition, flown by Theo Cronweiss and won both the technical prize and the overall award, winning Messerschmitt 60,000 RM which he invested in BFW.

Only two were built, but the low-wing, aerodynamically clean M.19 lead to a series of two-seat developments: the successful M.23, the M.27, the M.31 and the M.35.

== Specifications ==
Data from Smith 1971, p. 18

General characteristics

- Length: 5.40 m (17 ft 8.75 in)
- Wingspan: 9.60 m (31 ft 6 in)
- Empty weight: 138 kg (304 lb)
- Gross weight: 336 kg (741 lb)
- Powerplant: 1 × ABC Scorpion , 18 kW (24 hp)

Performance

- Maximum speed: 114 km/h (71 mph, 62 kn)
