= Messerschmitt M 18 =

M 18
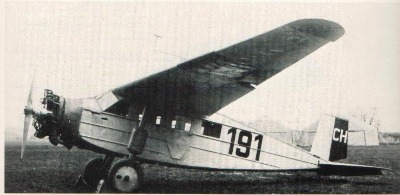
- An Armstrong-Siddeley Lynx-powered M-18d of Ad Astra Aero in Switzerland

General information
- Type: Airliner
- National origin: Germany
- Manufacturer: Messerschmitt / Bayerische Flugzeugwerke (BFW)
- Designer: Willy Messerschmitt
- Primary user: Nordbayerische Verkehrsflug
- Number built: ca 24

History
- First flight: 1926

The Bayerische Flugzeugwerke M 18 (BFW M 18), (later known as Messerschmitt M 18) was an airliner, produced in Germany in the late 1920s.

== Design and development ==
Designed at the request of Theodor Croneiss to supply his new airline venture which was to become Nordbayerische Verkehrsflug (NOBA), it was a conventional high-wing cantilever monoplane with fixed tailskid undercarriage. The prototype was built of wood, although production examples would have a metal structure. The design was praised in its day for the cleanness of its aerodynamics, lightness of construction, and economy of operation

== Operational history ==
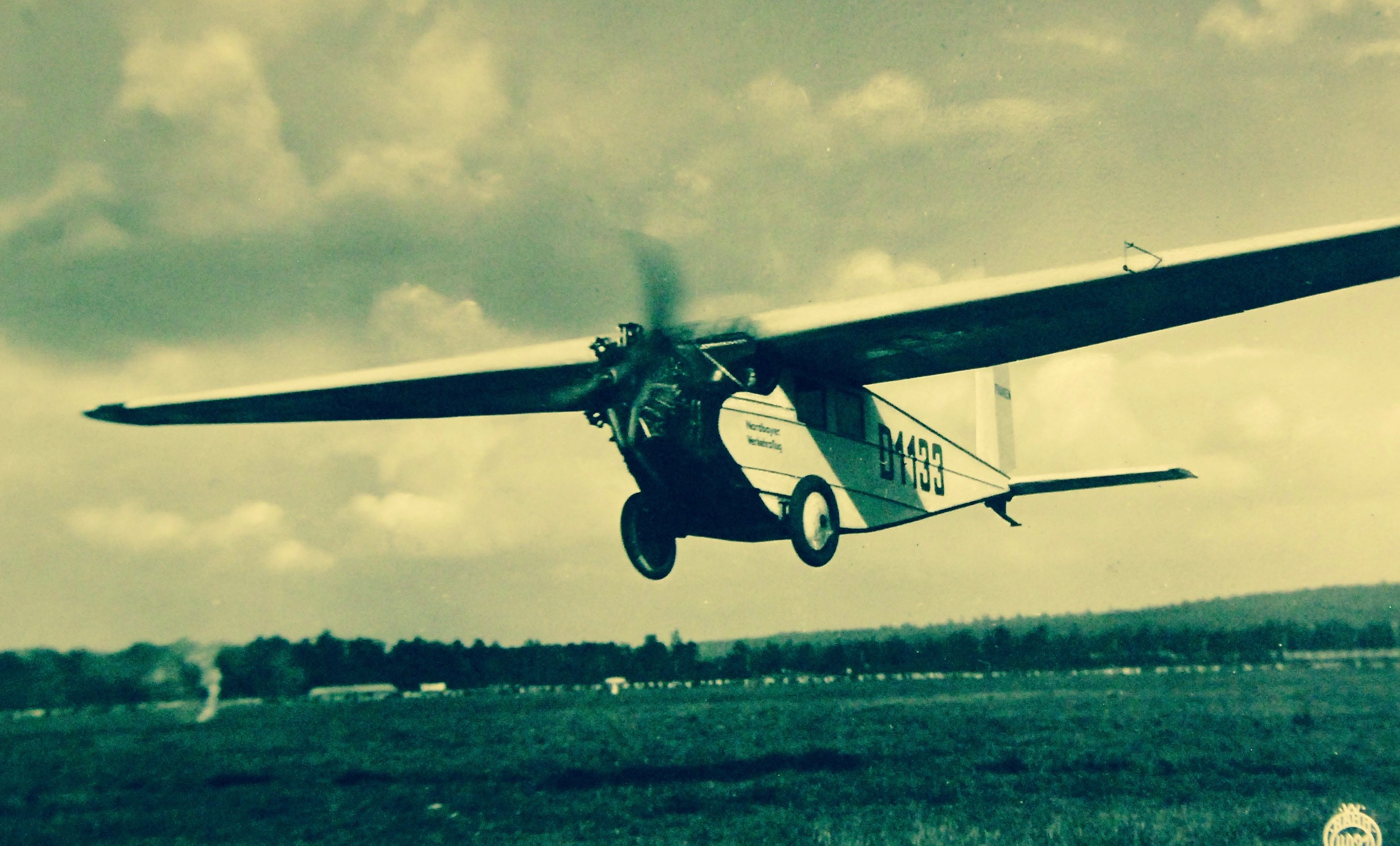
An M 18 in flight

The first M 18 to enter service with NOBA was provided by Messerschmitt in exchange for a 49% share of the new company, and on 26 July it began commercial flights. NOBA's early successes enabled the company to place orders for additional examples of an improved model, the M 18b. It would eventually purchase twelve of these, but manufacturing them would exceed the capacity of Messerschmitt's own small firm, leading to a merger with Bayerische Flugzeugwerke (BFW) in 1927. Following NOBA's reorganisation into DEVAG in 1931, a small number of a further-improved version, designated M 18d, were ordered, but the type was soon superseded by the similar but larger Messerschmitt M 20.

== Variants ==
M 18a
three-seat production version with 60 kW (80 hp) Siemens-Halske Sh 11 engine (two built)
M 18b

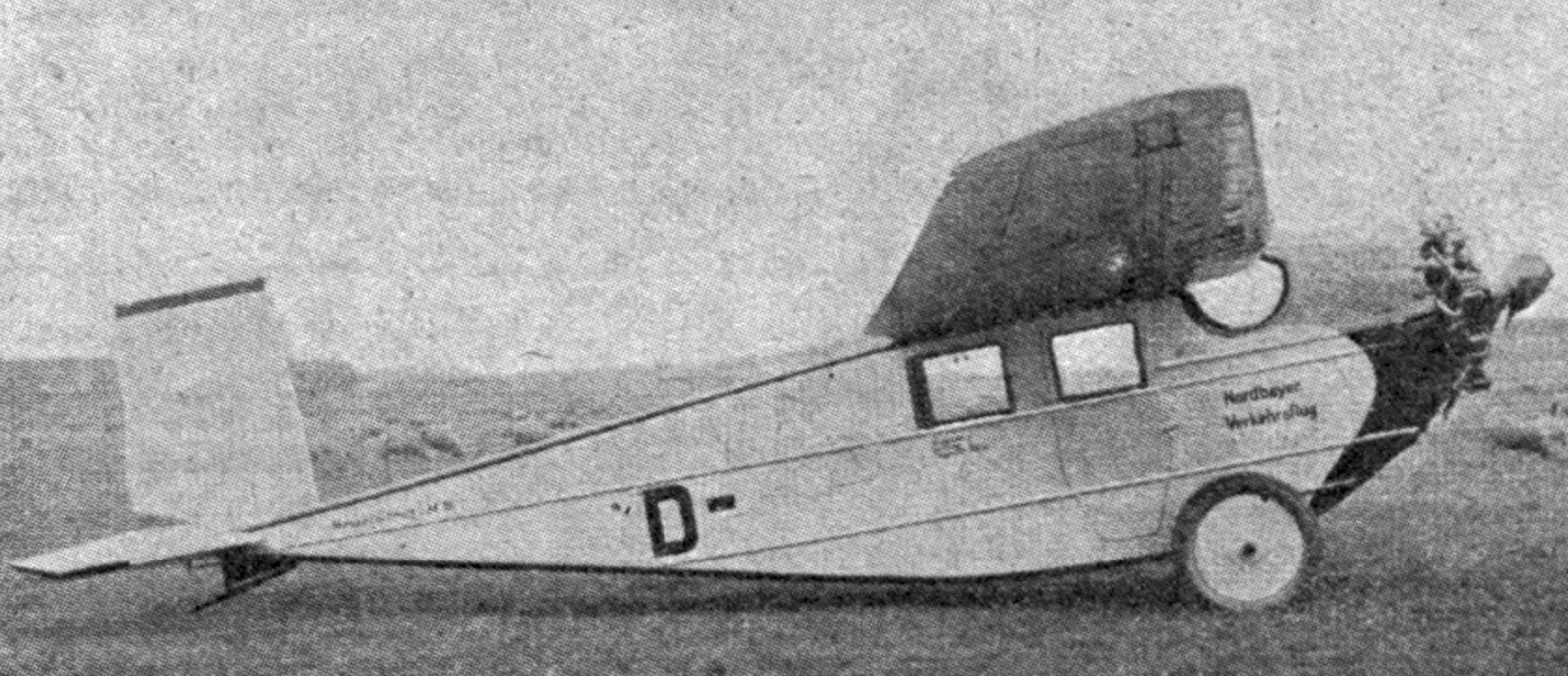
Messerschmitt M.18b photo from Les Ailes December 15, 1927

three/four-seat production version with 82 kW (110 hp) Siemens-Halske Sh 12 engine (12 built)
M 18c
photographic survey version with 164 kW (220 hp) Armstrong Siddeley Lynx engine (two or three built)
M 18d
enlarged six/seven/eight-passenger version, produced with a variety of engines, including the 164 kW (220 hp) Armstrong Siddely Lynx, 112 kW (150 hp) Walter Mars and 240 kW (320 hp) Wright Whirlwind. (eight built)

== Operators ==
Switzerland

- Swiss Air Force

== Specifications (M 18d) ==
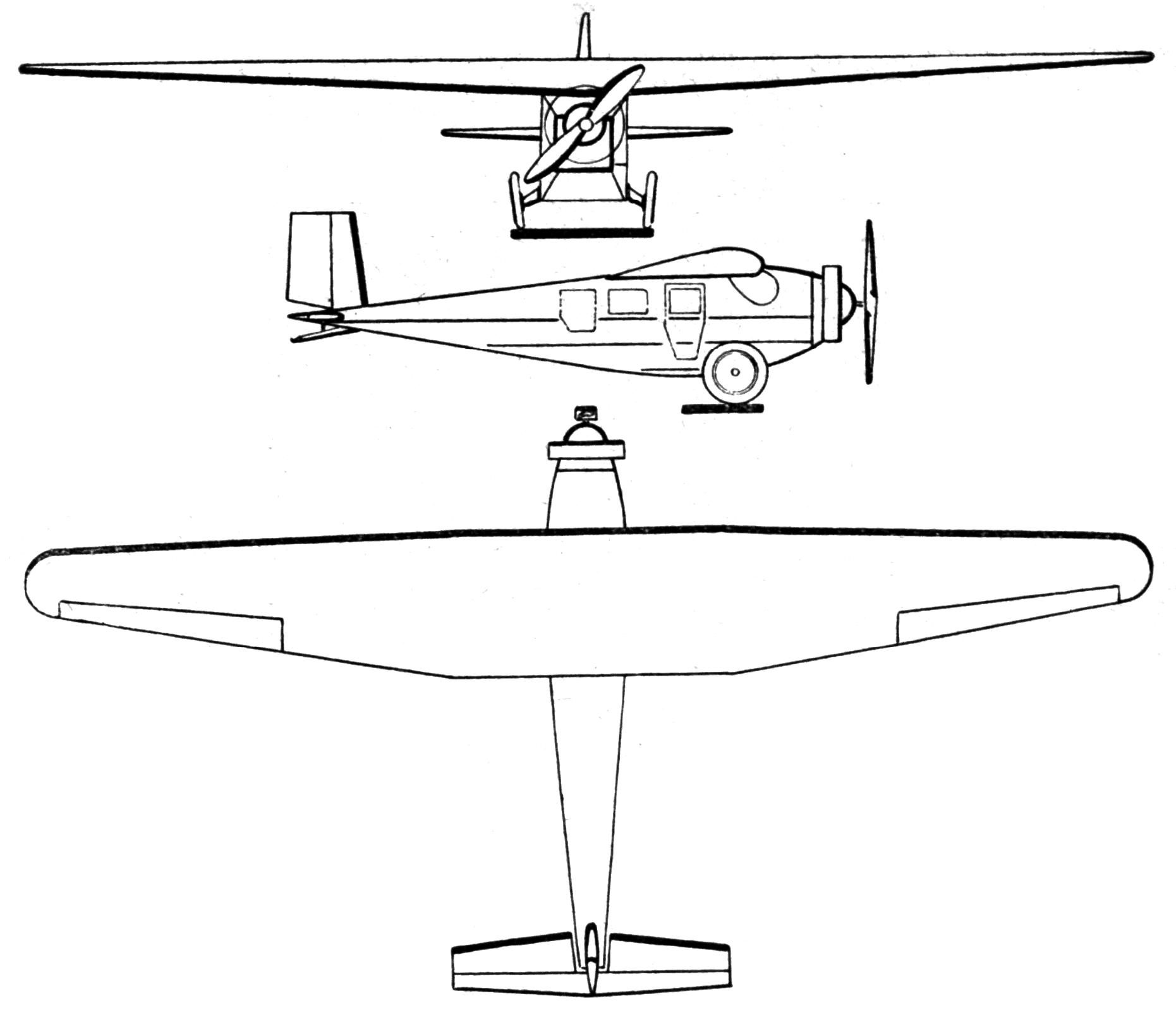
Messerschmitt M.18b 3-view drawing from Les Ailes December 15, 1927

Data from Messerschmitt: an aircraft album, Flugzeug-Typenbuch 1936

General characteristics

- Crew: 1
- Capacity: 7 passengers
- Length: 9.4 m (30 ft 10 in)
- Wingspan: 15.8 m (51 ft 10 in)
- Height: 2.8 m (9 ft 2 in)
- Wing area: 24.8 m^{2} (267 sq ft)
- Empty weight: 890 kg (1,962 lb)
- Gross weight: 1,760 kg (3,880 lb)
- Fuel capacity: main tank:240 L (63 US gal; 53 imp gal); oil tank:20 L (5.3 US gal; 4.4 imp gal)
- Powerplant: 1 × Wright R-975 Whirlwind 9-cyl. air-cooled radial piston engine, 240 kW (320 hp)

Performance

- Maximum speed: 212 km/h (132 mph, 114 kn)
- Cruise speed: 180 km/h (110 mph, 97 kn) * Landing Speed: 90 km/h (56 mph; 49 kn)
- Range: 630 km (390 mi, 340 nmi)
- Endurance: 3.8 hours
- Service ceiling: 5,300 m (17,400 ft)
- Rate of climb: 3.1 m/s (610 ft/min)
- Time to altitude: 1,000 m (3,300 ft) in 7 minutes
- Wing loading: 75 kg/m^{2} (15 lb/sq ft)
- Power/mass: 0.126 kW/kg (0.077 hp/lb)
