= BFW M.20 =

Type of aircraft

M.20
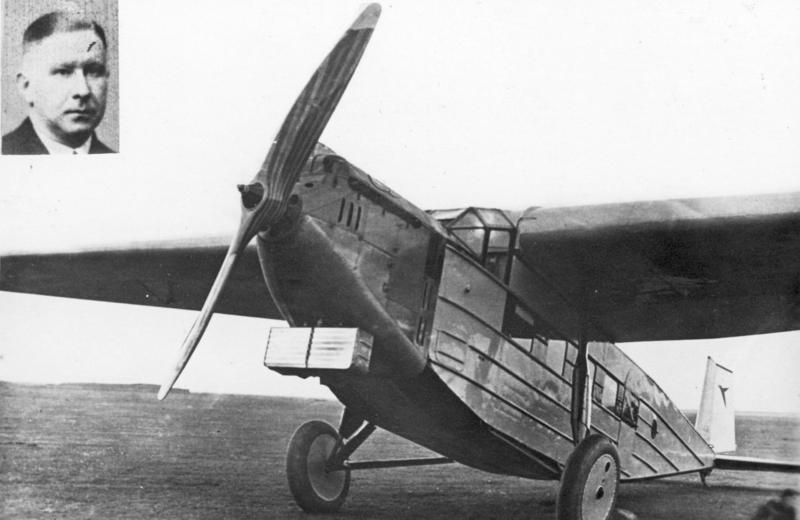
- M 20, with a picture of pilot Erich Pust, who was killed with eight passengers on another M.20 (D-1930) near Dresden, on the Berlin-Vienna run.

General information
- Type: Passenger transport
- Manufacturer: Bayerische Flugzeugwerke
- Designer: Willy Messerschmitt
- Primary user: Deutsche Luft Hansa
- Number built: 15

History
- Introduction date: 1929
- First flight: 26 February 1928
- Retired: 1948

The BFW M.20 (also known as the Messerschmitt M.20 after the designer's surname) was a German single-engine, high-wing monoplane ten-seat passenger transport aircraft, developed in the late 1920s and early 1930s. Deutsche Luft Hansa used it throughout the 1930s on a variety of routes.

== Design and development ==
The M 20 was designed by Willy Messerschmitt at Bayerische Flugzeugwerke, primarily for use with Luft Hansa which had ordered two in advance of the first flight. It was a development of the BFW M.18d eight-seater, equipped with a single 375 kW (500 hp) upright inline water-cooled BMW VIa engine. It had a high, cantilever wing based around a robust D-section box formed from a single dural spar and dural skin, forward to the leading edge. The fuselage was all-metal, with a mostly dural frame, covered with metal sheeting providing rectangular cross-section accommodation, with four square windows each side, for eight passengers. The single-axle main undercarriage was strutted vertically to the wing.

The aircraft made its maiden flight on 26 February 1928, but was lost when pilot Hans Hackmack bailed out at low altitude and was killed, after the surface stripped from part of the wing. A second M.20 was flown on 3 August 1928, and became the first of two M.20a series to fly with Luft Hansa.

Encouraged by their performance, Luft Hansa ordered 12 more, enlarged, M.20b aircraft. These carried ten passengers in a fuselage with five windows each side. It had dihedral on the wing and a more rounded vertical tail.

== Operational history ==
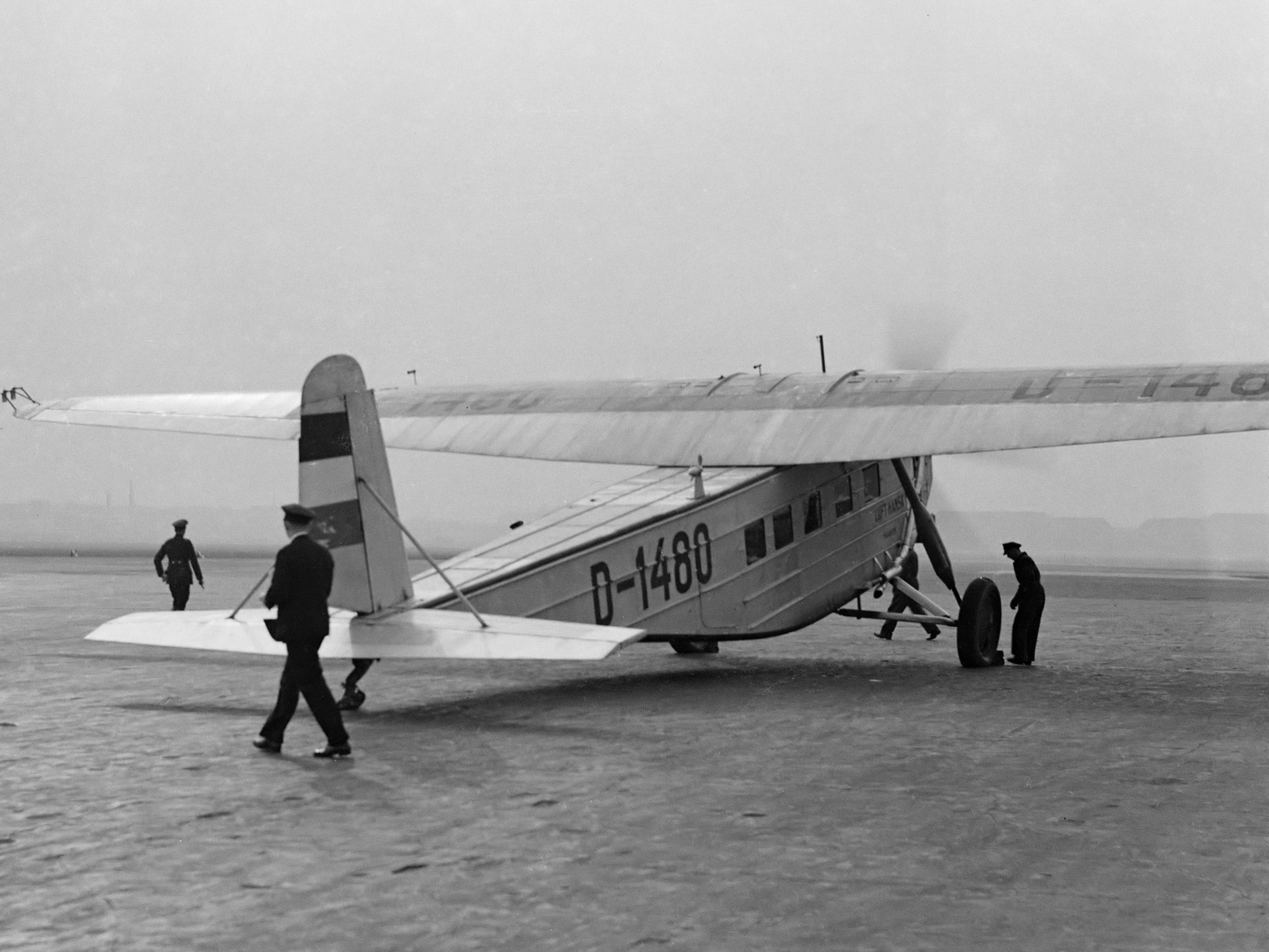
M.20b (1934)

The Luft Hansa M.20s entered service in 1929 on routes that went from Switzerland via Germany to the Netherlands and from Stuttgart via Marseille to Barcelona. From the mid-1930s, they were operating German internal and holiday routes. Two were still flying such routes in 1942.

One former Luft Hansa airframe went to Brazil in 1937, flying with Varig as PP-VAK, until it crashed on 7 March 1948, the only M.20 to survive the war

=== The Messerschmitt-Milch relationship ===
Hans Hackmack, who died in the first flight of the M 20, was a close friend of Erhard Milch, the head of Luft Hansa and the German civil aviation authorities. Milch was upset by the lack of response from Messerschmitt and this led to a lifelong hatred towards him. Milch eventually cancelled all contracts with Messerschmitt and forced BFW into bankruptcy in 1931. However, the German rearmament programs and Messerschmitt's friendship with Hugo Junkers prevented a stagnation of the careers of himself and BFW, which was started again in 1933. Milch still prevented Messerschmitt's takeover of BFW until 1938, hence the designation "Bf" of early Messerschmitt designs.

== Variants ==
M.20a
The first two eight-seater aircraft for Luft Hansa.
M.20b
Twelve ten-seaters built for Luft Hansa.
M.20b-2
Upgraded with a 480 kW (640 hp) BMW VIu engine.

== Operators ==
Germany

- Luft Hansa

Brazil

- Varig

== Specifications (M.20b) ==
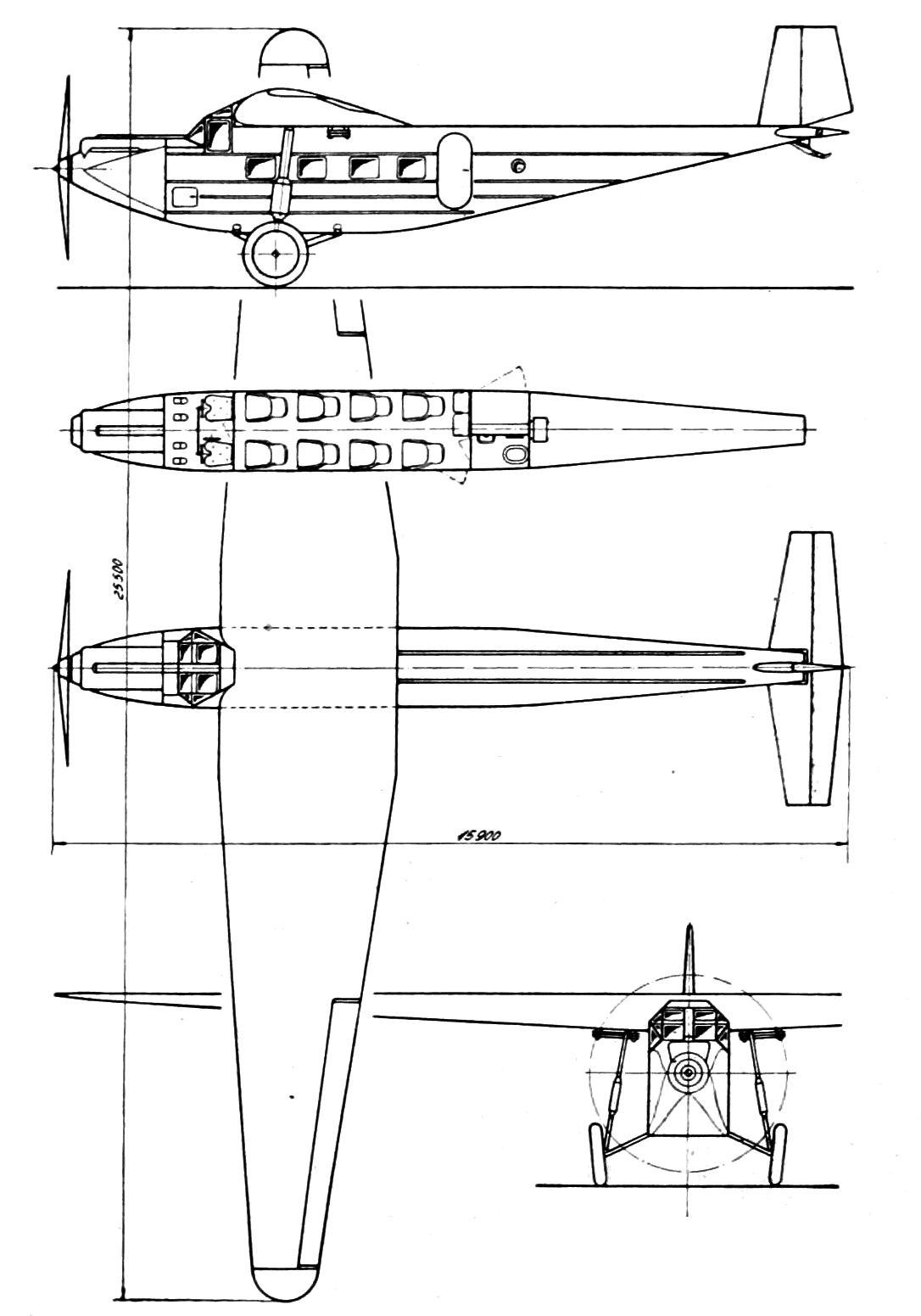
BFW M 20 3-view drawing from Aero Digest February 1929

Data from Messerschmitt: an aircraft album, Flugzeug-Typenbuch 1936, Flight 281028

General characteristics

- Crew: 2
- Capacity: 10 passengers
- Length: 15.8 m (51 ft 10 in)
- Wingspan: 25.5 m (83 ft 8 in)
- Height: 4.8 m (15 ft 9 in)
- Wing area: 65 m^{2} (700 sq ft)
- Aspect ratio: 10
- Empty weight: 2,990 kg (6,592 lb) passengers; 2,590 kg (5,710 lb) freight
- Gross weight: 3,990 kg (8,796 lb) passengers; 4,010 kg (8,840 lb) freight
- Fuel capacity: main tank:750 L (200 US gal; 160 imp gal); oil tank:40 L (11 US gal; 8.8 imp gal)
- Powerplant: 1 × BMW VI V-12 water-cooled piston engine, 480 kW (640 hp) For take-off (1 minute), 500 hp (370 kW) continuous
- Propellers: 2-bladed wooden fixed pitch propeller

Performance

- Maximum speed: 205 km/h (127 mph, 111 kn)
- Cruise speed: 170 km/h (110 mph, 92 kn)
- Range: 1,050 km (650 mi, 570 nmi)
- Endurance: 6.1 hours
- Service ceiling: 4,600 m (15,100 ft)
- Rate of climb: 3.5 m/s (690 ft/min)
- Time to altitude: 1,000 m (3,281 ft) in 5 minutes
- Wing loading: 73.8 kg/m^{2} (15.1 lb/sq ft)
- Landing Speed: 90 km/h (56 mph; 49 kn)

== See also ==
Related development

- Messerschmitt M 18

Aircraft of comparable role, configuration, and era

- Focke-Wulf A 17
- Fokker F.XIV
- Kalinin K-5
- Latécoère 28
- Nieuport-Delage NiD 540
- Stout 2-AT Pullman
