= Willy Messerschmitt =

German aircraft designer and manufacturer (1898–1978)

Wilhelm Emil Messerschmitt
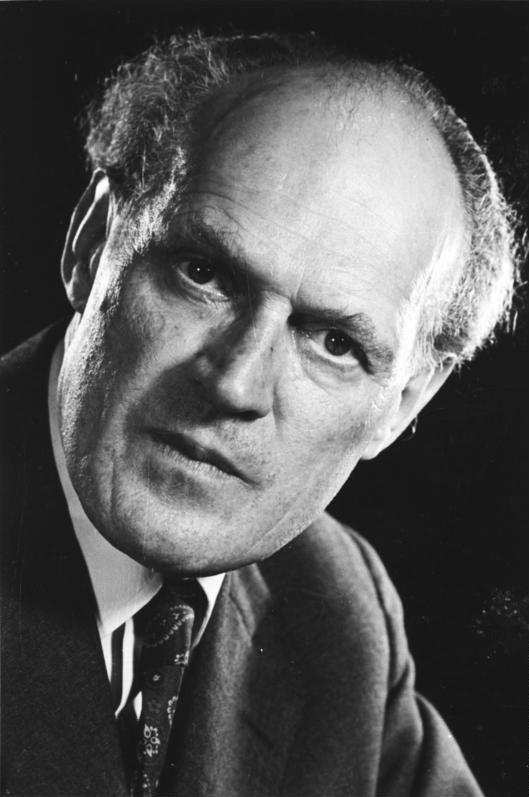
- Messerschmitt in 1958
- Born: 26 June 1898; Frankfurt am Main, German Empire
- Died: 17 September 1978 (aged 80); Munich, West Germany
- Education: Munich Institute of Technology
- Occupation: Aerospace engineer

Wilhelm Emil "Willy" Messerschmitt (German pronunciation: [ˈmɛsɐʃmɪt]; 26 June 1898 – 17 September 1978) was a German aircraft designer and manufacturer who designed a number of prominent aircraft for the Luftwaffe and civil aviation.

Messerschmitt designed a number of successful motor gliders and airliners in the early 1920s until the BFW M.20 damaged his reputation, put his company into bankruptcy, and earned the hate of future Reich Aviation Ministry chief Erhard Milch. Messerschmitt rebuilt his company and produced a number of successful military aircraft for the Luftwaffe during World War II, until he was blacklisted from government contracts by Milch in 1941 and the Me 210 damaged his reputation again in 1942, forcing him to resign as director and into a research and development role. Messerschmitt was accused of using forced labor for aircraft production and convicted of collaborating with the Nazi regime in 1948. Messerschmitt worked in Spain until returning to Germany in 1955, serving as director of Messerschmitt AG until his retirement in 1970.

Messerschmitt designed the Messerschmitt Bf 109 in collaboration with Walter Rethel, which became the most important fighter aircraft in the Luftwaffe and remains the second most-produced warplane in history, with some 34,000 built. Messerschmitt's Bf 109R, later redesignated Messerschmitt Me 209, broke the absolute world airspeed record and held the world speed record for propeller-driven aircraft until 1969. Messerschmitt's firm also produced the first jet-powered fighter to enter service – the Messerschmitt Me 262.

== Early life ==
Wilhelm Emil Messerschmitt was born on 26 June 1898 in Frankfurt am Main, the son of Ferdinand Messerschmitt (1858–1916) and his second wife, Anna Maria Schaller (1867–1942). He was raised in Bamberg where his parents ran a large wine shop and wine bar. Messerschmitt had an interest in aviation from a young age, building his own model airplanes and his own gliders which he would test with his friends.

As a 13-year-old school boy, Messerschmitt befriended sailplane pioneer Friedrich Harth, who would become an important influence in his life. Harth joined the Imperial German Army after the outbreak of World War I in 1914, and while he was away at war, Messerschmitt continued work on one of Harth's designs, the S5 glider, until himself signing up for military service in 1917. Following the war, the two were reunited and continued to work together while Messerschmitt commenced study at the Munich Technical College and Harth built aircraft at the Bayerische Flugzeugwerke (BFW – Bavarian Aircraft Works). The S8 glider they designed and built together in 1921 broke a world duration record (albeit unofficially) and they went into partnership for a while running a flying school. The same year, the first plane entirely designed by Messerschmitt flew – the S9 glider.

== Beginning of his career ==
In 1923, Messerschmitt graduated from university, but he and Harth had a falling out and went their separate ways. Messerschmitt founded his own aircraft company at Augsburg which at first built sailplanes, but within two years had progressed via motor gliders to small powered aircraft - sports and touring types. These culminated in the Messerschmitt M 17 and Messerschmitt M 18 designs, which Messerschmitt sold to BFW in 1927, when the Bavarian state government encouraged a merger between the two companies. These were followed by the Messerschmitt M20 light transport in 1928, which proved a disaster for BFW and Messerschmitt himself. Two Deutsche Luft Hansa M20s were involved in serious crashes very soon after purchase, and this led the airline to cancel their order for the type. This caused a serious cashflow problem for the company and led to its bankruptcy in 1931. The M20 crashes also created a powerful enemy for Messerschmitt in that of Erhard Milch, the future deputy head of the Reich Aviation Ministry (RLM) and chief of development for the Luftwaffe, who had lost a close friend Hans Hackmack in one of the crashes.

== Nazi Germany and World War II ==
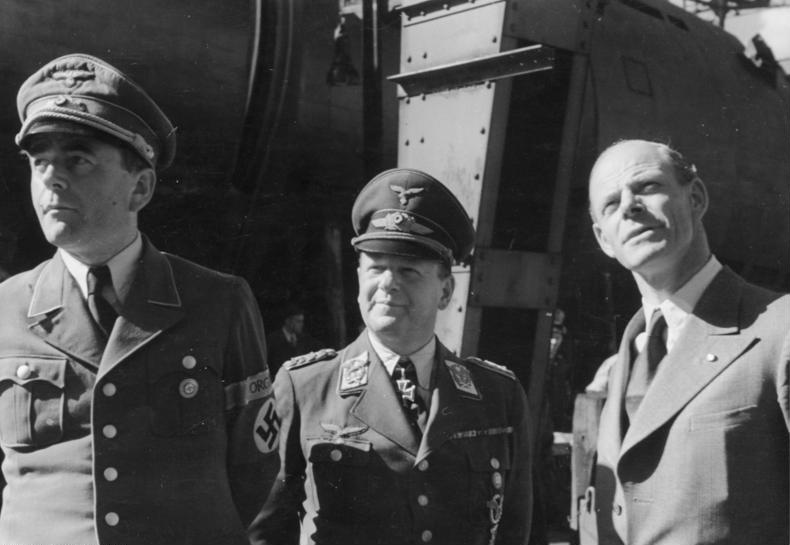
Messerschmitt meets with Erhard Milch (center) and Minister of Armaments and War Production Albert Speer

In 1925, Messerschmitt befriended Theodor Croneiss, a World War I fighter ace and the older brother of his test pilot Carl Croneiss. Theo Croneiss was director of an air sports club that was front organisation for the Reichswehr, at the time when Germany was forbidden from maintaining an air force due to the Treaty of Versailles. Messerschmitt was negotiating with a potential financier to equip his M17 with an engine, going as far as preparing to waive his patent rights to secure funding. Croneiss interrupted and instead offered 4,000 Reichsmarks to Messerschmitt, which he accepted. The motorised M17 would soon win a prize of 10,000 Reichsmarks.

The establishment of the RLM by the Nazi government in 1933, headed by Milch, led to a resurgence in the German aircraft industry and the resurrection of BFW. Messerschmitt, collaborating with Robert Lusser, designed the flagship product of the relaunched company. This was a low-wing four seater monoplane called the Messerschmitt M37, but better known by its later RLM designation of Bf 108. The following year, Messerschmitt incorporated many advanced design features of the Bf 108 into the Bf 109 fighter. Messerschmitt was able to form ties with leading Nazis Rudolf Hess and Hermann Göring (through Croneiss) which saved him from sharing the fate of Milch's other great enemy, Hugo Junkers. To stay in business in the face of Milch ensuring that he would get no government contracts, Messerschmitt had signed agreements with Romania for sales of the M35 and a transport plane, the Messerschmitt M 36. When Milch learned of this, he publicly denounced Messerschmitt as a traitor, and the Gestapo was sent to question him and other BFW officials. Probably due to Croneiss' intervention, no further action was taken.

In 1936, the Messerschmitt Bf 109 won the RLM's single-seat fighter contest, and became one of the main Luftwaffe aircraft types. Messerschmitt and his factory thus took an important role in the RLM's armament plans. This role expanded even further when the Bf 110 also won the multi-purpose fighter contest.

On 11 July 1938, Messerschmitt was appointed chairman and managing director of BFW, and the company was renamed after him to Messerschmitt AG. That same year, the company began work on what would eventually become the Me 262, and on the Me 210, the planned as successor for the Bf 110. The Me 210 turned out to be plagued by massive development problems that were solved only by evolving the type into the Messerschmitt Me 410 at the insistence of Ernst Udet, director of the Luftwaffe's research and development. The situation worsened when Udet coincidentally committed suicide a short time afterwards, with Milch becoming the overall director of the Luftwaffe's production. The resulting problems and delays again put the reputation of both Messerschmitt and his namesake company in jeopardy. Adolf Hitler's interest in the Me 262 allowed him to gain some favour and protect him from further attacks from Milch. However, he was forcibly removed as director of his company and relegated to only development and design. Messerschmitt was later tasked with streamlining production of the Bf 109 into a final model before the introduction of the Me 262, but was uninterested and passed the work on to his colleague Ludwig Bölkow. His last project during the war was the partially-completed Messerschmitt P.1101.

== Trial and postwar career ==
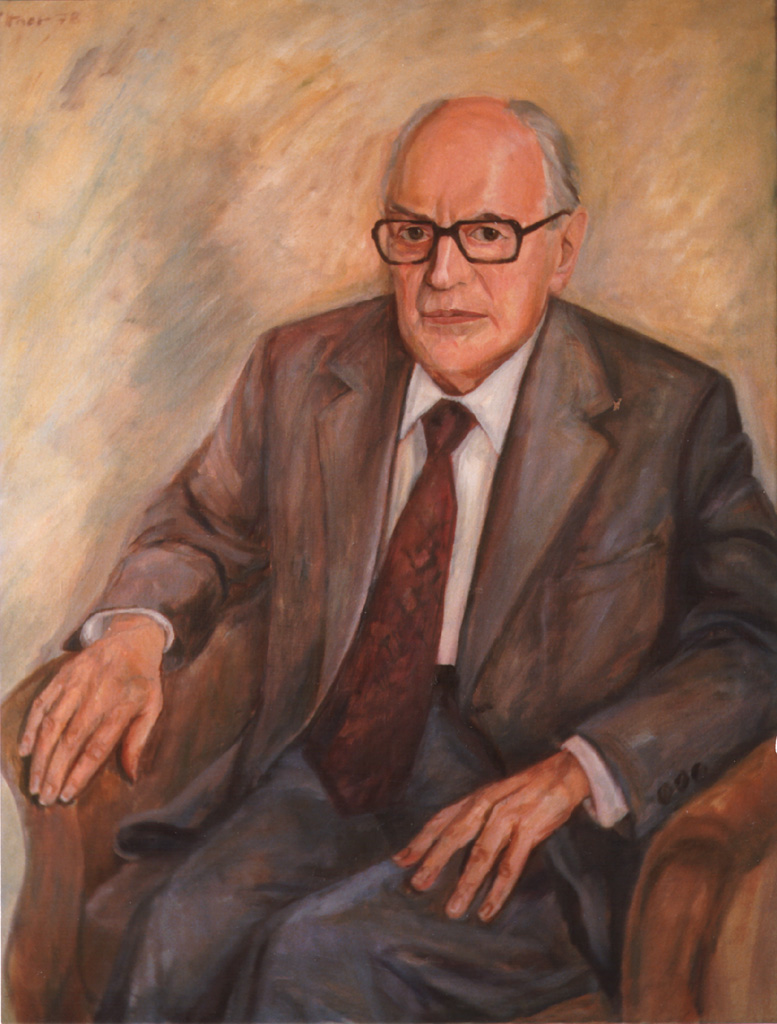
Portrait by Günter Rittner (1978)

Following World War II in 1945, Messerschmitt was classified as a "fellow traveler" of the Nazis and tried by a denazification court for the use of forced labor in the production of his aircraft. Milch had procured large numbers of forced labourers for the Luftwaffe due to his connections with the SS and utilised them in the mass production of aircraft. Messerschmitt was accused of relocating some production to the Flossenbürg, Dachau, and Gusen concentration camps, where the forced labour was sourced from, though the true extent of his involvement is unclear.

In 1948, Messerschmitt was convicted of collaborating with the Nazi regime and was released after two years in prison, resuming his position as head of his company. Since Germany was forbidden to manufacture aircraft until 1955, he turned his company to manufacturing prefabricated buildings, sewing machines, and small cars – most notably the Messerschmitt Kabinenroller. Exporting his talents to Francoist Spain, he designed the Hispano HA-200 jet trainer for Hispano Aviación in 1952 before eventually being allowed to return to aircraft manufacturing in Germany to licence-produce the Fiat G.91 and then Lockheed F-104 Starfighter for the West German Air Force. He designed the later Helwan HA-300, a light supersonic interceptor, for the Egyptian Air Force. This was his last aircraft design.

Messerschmitt saw his company through several mergers, first with Bölkow in 1968 and then Hamburger Flugzeugbau in 1969, at which point it became Messerschmitt-Bölkow-Blohm (which itself became part of EADS now named Airbus) with him as chairman until 1970 when he retired.

Messerschmitt died on 17 September 1978 in a Munich hospital in undisclosed circumstances.

== Criticism ==
Messerschmitt's designs were characterized by a clear focus on performance, especially by striving for lightweight construction, but also by minimizing parasitic drag from aerodynamic surfaces. His critics accused him of taking this approach too far in some designs. His falling out with Harth had been over designs Harth felt to be dangerously unstable, and the Me 210 displayed instability, too, which could be cured only by enlarging the airframe and the aerodynamic surfaces, increasing drag and weight. Messerschmitt's design philosophy also is evident in his arguments with Alexander Lippisch, who was designing the tailless Me 163 rocket fighter for production at the Messerschmitt works. While Lippisch maintained that the tailless design had an advantage, in principle, with regard to total drag, Messerschmitt pointed out that the design compromises, which are necessary to make a tailless aircraft safely controllable, defeated this purpose by increasing drag to the original level and above.

== Awards ==
Messerschmitt was appointed Honorary Professor by the Munich Technical College in 1938, and the Vice-President of the Deutsche Akademie für Luftfahrtforschung (German Academy of Aeronautical Research). The German government also awarded him the title of Wehrwirtschaftsführer (defense industry leader). In 1938, Adolf Hitler bestowed upon Messerschmitt the German National Prize for Art and Science.

In 1979, Messerschmitt was inducted into the International Air & Space Hall of Fame at the San Diego Air & Space Museum.
