= Messerschmitt 209 =

Messerschmitt Me 209 may refer to several different German aircraft:

- Messerschmitt Me 209, high-speed experimental prototype single-seater from 1938;
- Messerschmitt Me 209-II, 1943 prototypical variant of the Messerschmitt Bf 109 fighter;
- MBB Bo 209, two-seat light aircraft developed in 1968 by Messerschmitt-Bölkow-Blohm.
