= Messerschmitt Bf 109 =

German single-engine fighter aircraft family

Bf 109
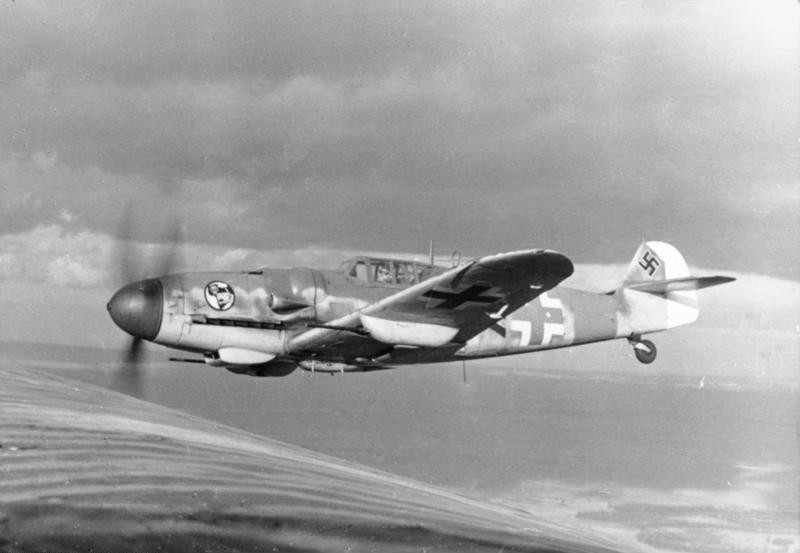
- A Bf 109G-6 of JG 27 "Afrika" in flight, 1943

General information
- Type: Fighter
- Manufacturer: Bayerische Flugzeugwerke (BFW)
- Designer: Willy Messerschmitt, Robert Lusser
- Status: Retired
- Primary users: Luftwaffe Royal Hungarian Air Force; National Republican Air Force; Royal Romanian Air Force
- Number built: 34,248 +603 Avia S-199 +239 HA-1112

History
- Introduction date: February 1937
- First flight: 29 May 1935
- Retired: 9 May 1945, Luftwaffe; 27 December 1965, Spanish Air Force
- Variants: Avia S-99/S-199; Hispano Aviación HA-1112

The Messerschmitt Bf 109 is a monoplane fighter aircraft that was designed and initially produced by the German aircraft manufacturer Bayerische Flugzeugwerke (BFW). Together with the Focke-Wulf Fw 190, the Bf 109 formed the backbone of the Luftwaffe's fighter force during the Second World War. It was commonly called the Me 109 by Allied aircrew and some German aces/pilots, even though this was not the official model designation.

The Bf 109 was designed by Willy Messerschmitt and Robert Lusser, who worked at BFW during the early to mid-1930s. It was conceived as an interceptor. However, later models were developed to fulfill multiple tasks, serving as bomber escort, fighter-bomber, day-, night-, all-weather fighter, ground-attack aircraft, and aerial reconnaissance aircraft. It was one of the most advanced fighters when it first appeared, being furnished with an all-metal monocoque construction, a closed canopy, retractable landing gear, and powered by a liquid-cooled, inverted-V12 aero engine. First flown on 29 May 1935, the Bf 109 entered operational service during 1937; it first saw combat during the Spanish Civil War.

During the Second World War, the Bf 109 was supplied to several states and was present in quantity on virtually every front in the European theatre; the fighter was still in service at the end of the conflict in 1945. It continued to be operated by several countries for many years after the conflict. The Bf 109 is the most produced fighter aircraft in history, a total of 34,248 airframes having been produced between 1936 and April 1945. Some of the Bf 109 production took place in Nazi concentration camps through slave labor.

The Bf 109 was flown by the three top-scoring fighter aces of all time, who claimed 928 victories among them while flying with Jagdgeschwader 52, mainly on the Eastern Front. The highest-scoring, Erich Hartmann, was credited with 352 victories. The aircraft was also flown by Hans-Joachim Marseille, the highest-scoring ace in the North African campaign, who shot down 158 enemy aircraft (in about a third of the time). It was also flown by many aces from other countries fighting with Germany, notably the Finn Ilmari Juutilainen, the highest-scoring non-German ace. He scored 58 of his 94 confirmed victories with the Bf 109. Pilots from Hungary, Romania, Bulgaria, Croatia, Slovakia and Italy also flew the fighter. Through constant development, the Bf 109 remained competitive with the latest Allied fighter aircraft until the end of the war.

== Design and development ==
=== Origins ===
During 1933, the Technisches Amt (C-Amt), the technical department of the Reichsluftfahrtministerium (RLM) ("Reich Aviation Ministry"), concluded a series of research projects into the future of air combat. The result of the studies was four broad outlines for future aircraft:

- Rüstungsflugzeug I for a multi-seat medium bomber
- Rüstungsflugzeug II for a tactical bomber
- Rüstungsflugzeug III for a single-seat fighter
- Rüstungsflugzeug IV for a two-seat heavy fighter

Bf 109 G6 in flight

Rüstungsflugzeug III was intended to be a short range interceptor, replacing the Arado Ar 64 and Heinkel He 51 biplanes then in service. In late March 1933, the RLM published the tactical requirements for a single-seat fighter in the document L.A. 1432/33.

The projected fighter needed to have a top speed of 400 km/h (250 mph) at 6,000 m (20,000 ft), to be maintained for 20 minutes, while having a total flight duration of 90 minutes. The critical altitude of 6,000 metres was to be reached in no more than 17 minutes, and the fighter was to have an operational ceiling of 10,000 m (33,000 ft). Power was to be provided by the new Junkers Jumo 210 engine of about 522 kW (710 PS; 700 hp). It was to be armed with either a single 20 mm MG C/30 engine-mounted cannon firing through the propeller hub as a Motorkanone, or two synchronized, engine cowl-mounted 7.92 mm (.312 in) MG 17 machine guns, or one lightweight engine-mounted 20 mm MG FF cannon with two 7.92 mm MG 17s. The MG C/30 was an airborne adaption of the 2 cm FlaK 30 anti-aircraft gun, which fired very powerful "Long Solothurn" ammunition, but was very heavy and had a low rate of fire. It was also specified that the wing loading should be kept below 100 kg/m^{2}. The performance was to be evaluated based on the fighter's level speed, rate of climb, and maneuverability, in that order.

It has been suggested that Bayerische Flugzeugwerke (BFW) was originally not invited to participate in the competition due to personal animosity between Willy Messerschmitt and RLM director Erhard Milch; (Note: In 1929 Milch, then managing director of Deutsche Luft Hansa cancelled an order for 10 Messerschmitt M20b light transport aircraft after Hans Hackman, a close friend of Milch, was killed testing the prototype.) however, recent research by Willy Radinger and Walter Shick indicates that this may not have been the case, as all three competing companies—Arado, Heinkel and BFW—received the development contract for the L.A. 1432/33 requirements at the same time in February 1934. A fourth company, Focke-Wulf, received a copy of the development contract only in September 1934. The powerplant was to be the new Junkers Jumo 210, but the proviso was made that it would be interchangeable with the more powerful, but less developed Daimler-Benz DB 600 powerplant. Each was asked to deliver three prototypes for head-to-head testing in late 1934.

=== Prototypes ===
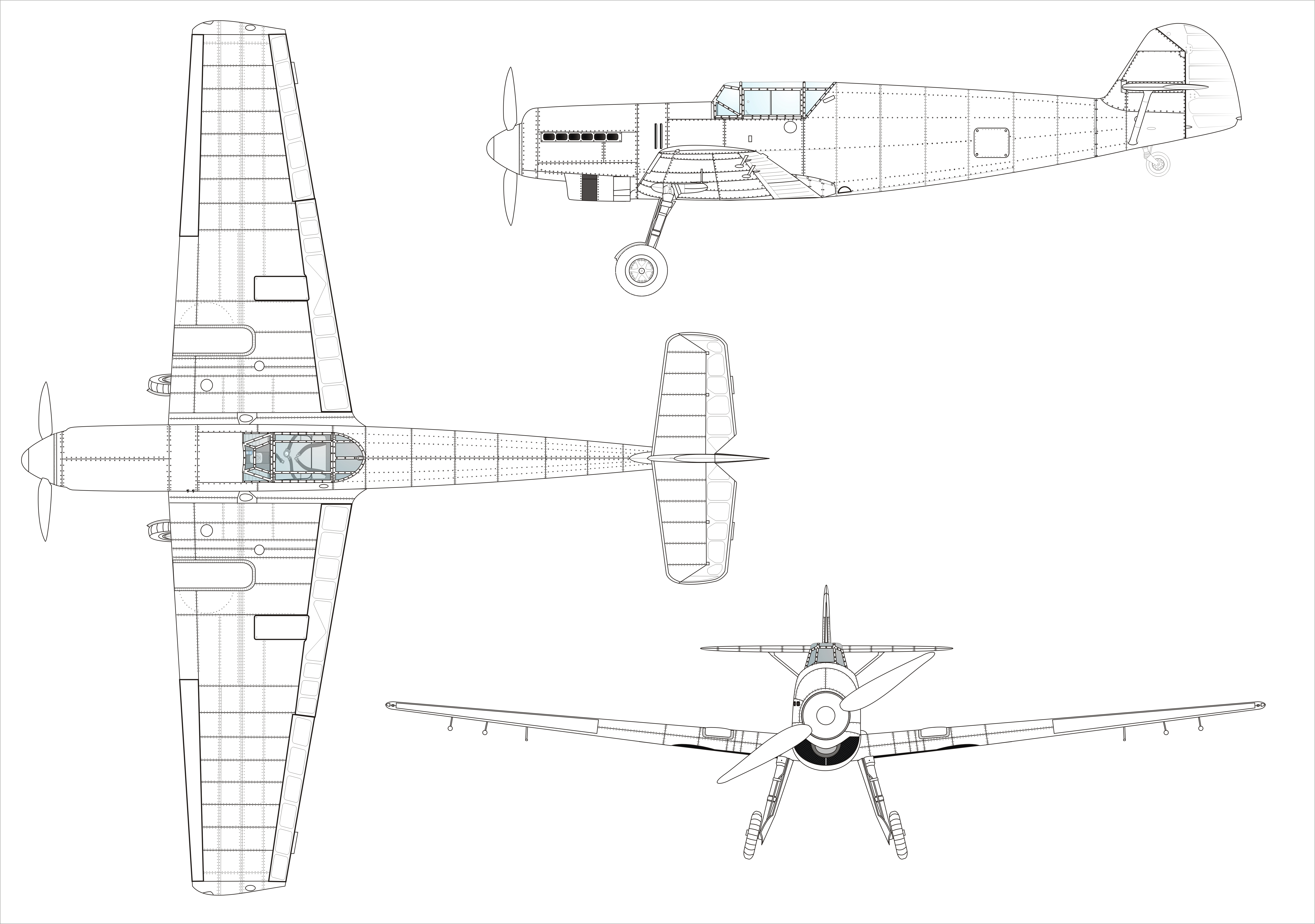
Messerschmitt Bf 109 V1

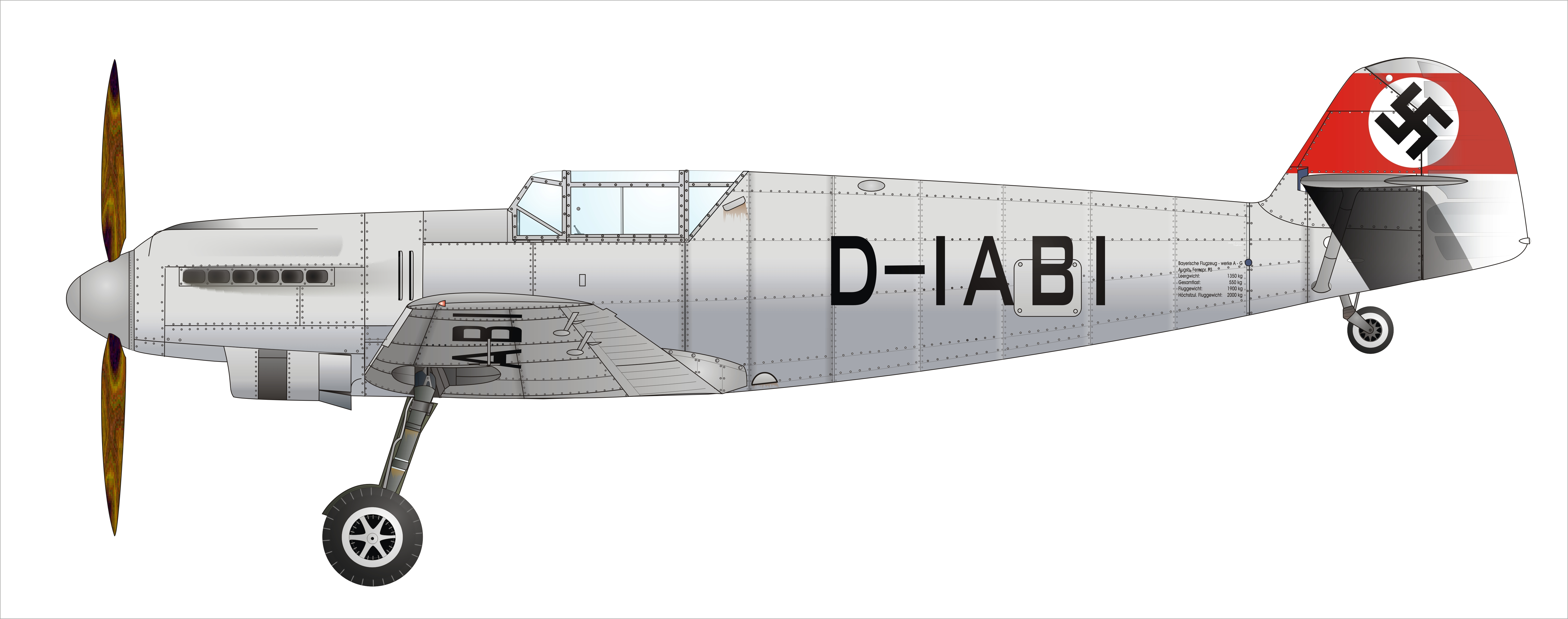
A drawing of the V1 prototype

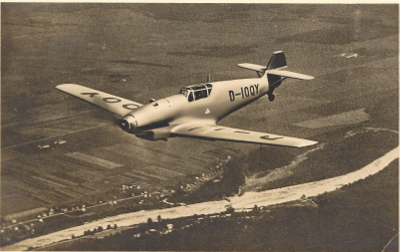
Prototype V3

Design work on Messerschmitt Project Number P.1034 began in March 1934, just three weeks after the development contract was awarded. The basic mock-up was completed by May, and a more detailed design mock-up was ready by January 1935. The RLM designated the design as type "Bf 109", the next available from a block of numbers assigned to BFW.

The first prototype (Versuchsflugzeug 1 or V1), with civilian registration D-IABI, was completed by May 1935, but the new German engines were not yet ready. To get the "R III" designs into the air, the RLM acquired four Rolls-Royce Kestrel VI engines by trading Rolls-Royce a Heinkel He 70 Blitz for use as an engine test-bed. (Note: This aircraft was instrumental in testing the Rolls-Royce PV-12, later to become the Rolls-Royce Merlin) Messerschmitt received two of these engines and adapted the engine mounts of V1 to take the V-12 engine upright. V1 made its maiden flight at the end of May 1935 at the airfield located in the southernmost Augsburg neighborhood of Haunstetten, piloted by Hans-Dietrich "Bubi" Knoetzsch. After four months of flight testing, the aircraft was delivered in September to the Luftwaffe's central test centre at the Erprobungsstelle Rechlin to take part in the design competition.

In 1935, the first Jumo engines became available, so V2 was completed in October using the 449 kW (610 PS; 602 hp) Jumo 210A engine. V3 followed, the first to be mounted with guns, but it did not fly until May 1936 due to a delay in procuring another Jumo 210 engine.

=== Design competition ===
After Luftwaffe acceptance trials were completed at their headquarters Erprobungsstelle (E-Stelle) military aviation test and development facility at Rechlin, the prototypes were moved to the subordinate E-Stelle Baltic seacoast facility at Travemünde for the head-to-head portion of the competition. The aircraft participating in the trials were the Arado Ar 80 V3, the Focke-Wulf Fw 159 V3, the Heinkel He 112 V4 and the Bf 109 V2. The He 112 arrived first, in early February 1936, followed by the rest of the prototypes by the end of the month.

Because most fighter pilots of the Luftwaffe were used to biplanes with open cockpits, low wing loading, light g-forces and easy handling like the Heinkel He 51, they were very critical of the Bf 109 at first. However, it soon became one of the frontrunners in the contest, as the Arado and Focke-Wulf entries, which were intended as "backup" programmes to safeguard against failure of the two favourites, proved to be completely outclassed. The Arado Ar 80, with its gull wing (replaced with a straight, tapered wing on the V3) and fixed, spatted undercarriage was overweight and underpowered, and the design was abandoned after three prototypes had been built. The parasol winged Fw 159, potentially inspired by the same firm's earlier Focke-Wulf Fw 56, was always considered by the E-Stelle Travemünde facility's staff to be a compromise between a biplane and an aerodynamically more efficient, low-wing monoplane. Although it had some advanced features, it used a novel, complex retractable main undercarriage which proved to be unreliable.

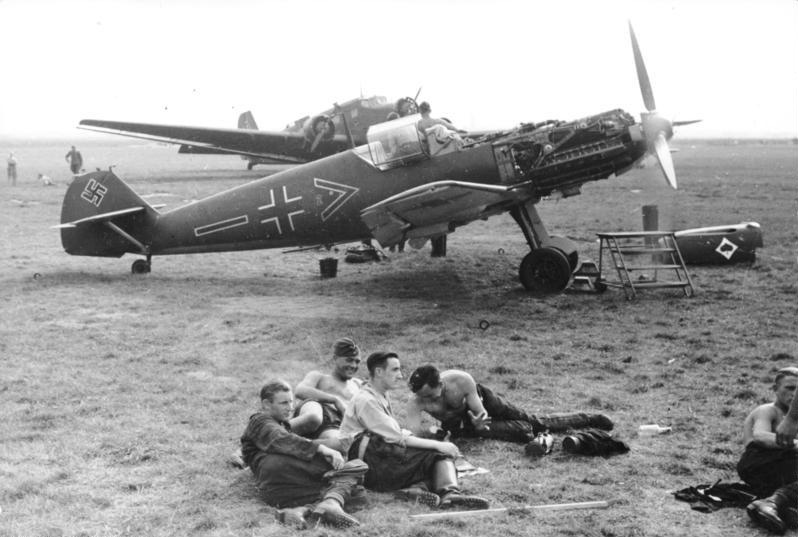
JG 53 Bf 109E-3, c. 1939/1940

Initially, the Bf 109 was regarded with disfavour by E-Stelle test pilots because of its steep ground angle, which resulted in poor forward visibility when taxiing; the sideways-hinged cockpit canopy, which could not be opened in flight (but could be dropped by the emergency arm). They were also concerned about the high wing loading.

The Heinkel He 112, based on a scaled-down Blitz, was the favourite of the Luftwaffe leaders. Compared with the Bf 109, it was also cheaper. Positive aspects of the He 112 included the wide track and robustness of the undercarriage (this opened outwards from mid wing, as opposed to the 109s which opened from the wing root), considerably better visibility from the cockpit and a lower wing loading that made for easier landings. In addition, the V4 had a single-piece, clear-view, sliding cockpit canopy and a more powerful Jumo 210Da engine with a modified exhaust system. However, the He 112 was also structurally complicated, being 18% heavier than the Bf 109, and it soon became clear that the thick wing, which spanned 12.6 m (41 ft 4 in) with an area of 23.2 m^{2} (249.7 ft^{2}) on the first prototype (V1), was a disadvantage for a light fighter, decreasing the aircraft's rate of roll and manoeuvrability. As a result, the He 112 V4 which was used for the trials had new wings, spanning 11.5 m (37 ft 8.75 in) with an area of 21.6 m^{2} (232.5 ft^{2}). However, the improvements had not been fully tested and the He 112 V4 could not be demonstrated in accordance with the rules laid down by the Acceptance Commission, placing it at a distinct disadvantage.

Because of its smaller, lighter airframe, the Bf 109 was 30 km/h (20 mph) faster than the He 112 in level flight, and superior in climbing and diving. The Commission ultimately ruled in favour of the Bf 109 because of the Messerschmitt test pilot's demonstration of the 109's capabilities during a series of spins, dives, flick rolls and tight turns, throughout which the pilot was in complete control of the aircraft.

In March, the RLM received news that the British Supermarine Spitfire had been ordered into production. It was felt that a quick decision was needed to get the winning design into production as soon as possible, so on 12 March, the RLM announced the results of the competition in a document entitled Bf 109 Priority Procurement, which ordered the Bf 109 into production. At the same time, Heinkel was instructed to radically redesign the He 112. The Messerschmitt 109 made its public debut during the 1936 Berlin Olympics when the V1 prototype was flown.

=== Design features ===
As with the earlier Bf 108, the new design was based on Messerschmitt's "lightweight construction" principle, which aimed to minimise the number of separate parts in the aircraft. Examples of this could be found in the use of two large, complex brackets which were fitted to the firewall. These brackets incorporated the lower engine mounts and landing gear pivot point into one unit. A large forging attached to the firewall housed the main spar pick-up points and carried most of the wing loads. Contemporary design practice was usually to have these main load-bearing structures mounted on different parts of the airframe, with the loads being distributed through the structure via a series of strong-points. By concentrating the loads in the firewall, the structure of the Bf 109 could be made relatively light and uncomplicated.

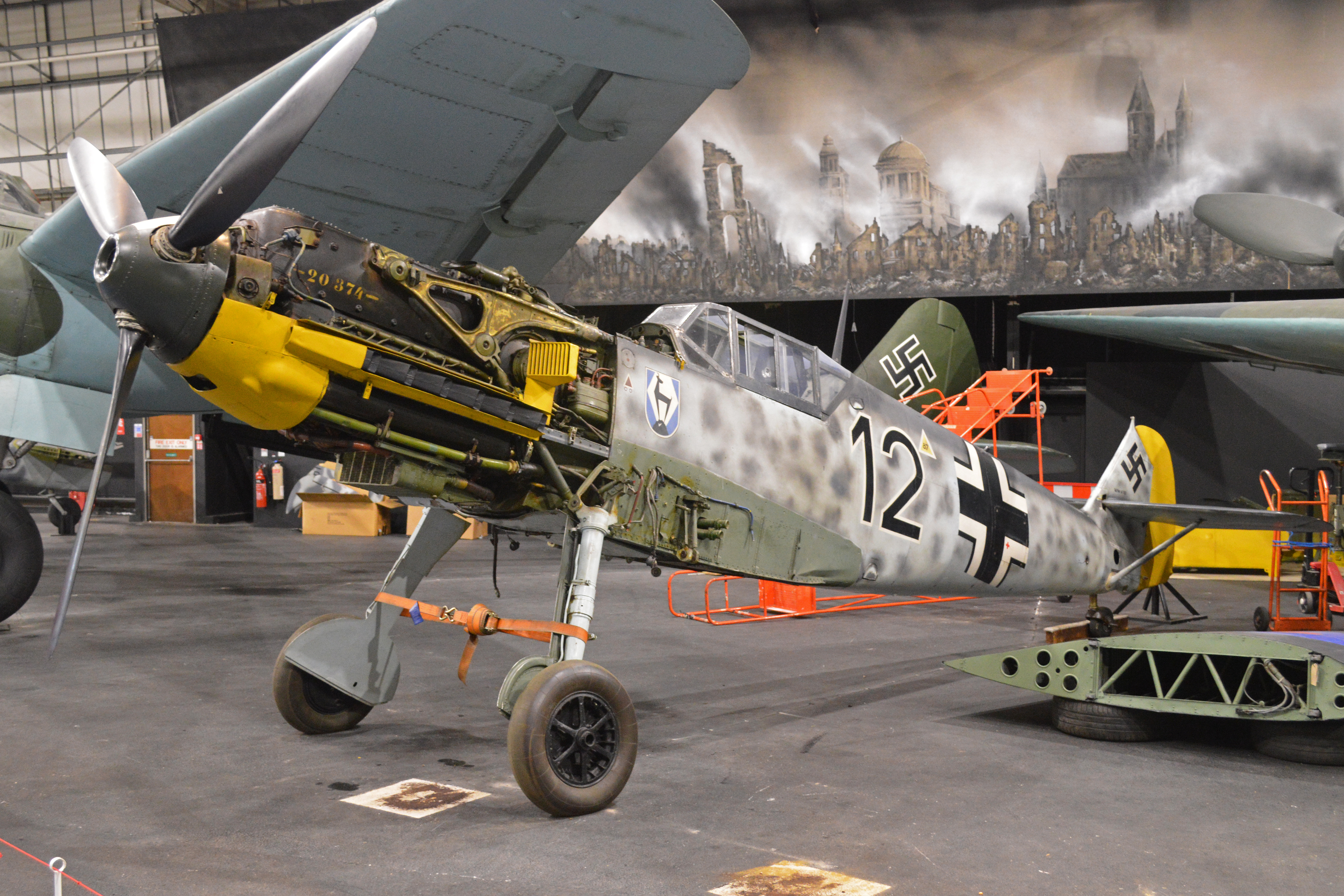
A Bf 109E at the Royal Air Force Museum London with its wings temporarily removed, 2016

An advantage of this design was that the main landing gear, which retracted through an 85-degree angle, was attached to the fuselage, making it possible to completely remove the wings for servicing without additional equipment to support the fuselage. It also allowed simplification of the wing structure, since it did not have to bear the loads imposed during takeoff or landing. The one major drawback of this landing gear arrangement was its narrow wheel track, making the aircraft unstable while on the ground. To increase stability, the legs were splayed outward somewhat, creating another problem in that the loads imposed during takeoff and landing were transferred up through the legs at an angle.

The small rudder of the Bf 109 was relatively ineffective at controlling the strong swing created by the powerful slipstream of the propeller during the early portion of the takeoff roll, and this sideways drift created disproportionate loads on the wheel opposite to the swing. If the forces imposed were large enough, the pivot point broke and the landing gear leg would collapse outward into its bay. Experienced pilots reported that the swing was easy to control, but some of the less-experienced pilots lost fighters on takeoff.

Because of the large ground angle caused by the long legs, forward visibility while on the ground was very poor, a problem exacerbated by the sideways-opening canopy. This meant that pilots had to taxi in a sinuous fashion which also imposed stresses on the splayed undercarriage legs. Ground accidents were a problem with inexperienced pilots, especially during the later stages of the war when pilots received less training before being sent to operational units. At least 10% of all Bf 109s were lost in takeoff and landing accidents, 1,500 of which occurred between 1939 and 1941. The installation of a fixed "tall" tailwheel on some of the late G-10s and −14s and the K-series helped alleviate the problem to a large extent.

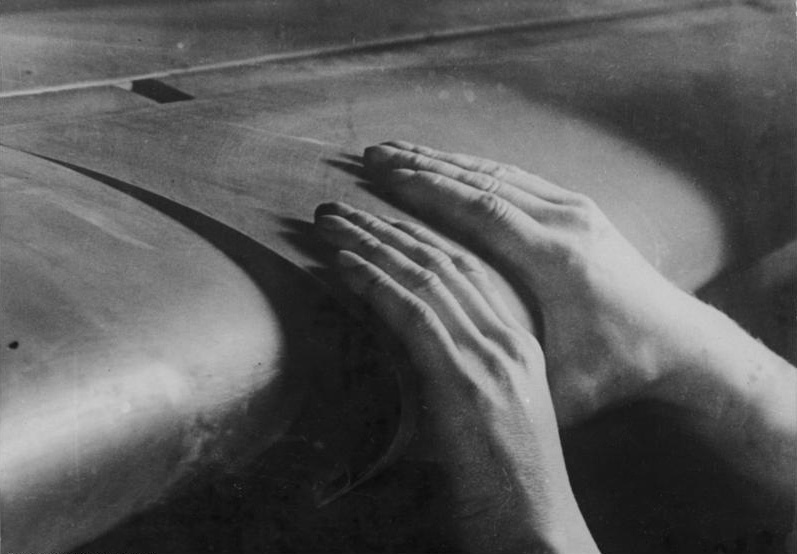
Freely moving, automatic leading edge slats on a Bf 109E. By using high-lift devices, the handling qualities of the Bf 109 were considerably enhanced.

From the inception of the design, priority was given to easy access to the powerplant, fuselage weapons and other systems while the aircraft was operating from forward airfields. To this end, the entire engine cowling was made up of large, easily removable panels which were secured by large toggle latches. A large panel under the wing centre section could be removed to gain access to the L-shaped main fuel tank, which was sited partly under the cockpit floor and partly behind the rear cockpit bulkhead. Other, smaller panels gave easy access to the cooling system and electrical equipment. The engine was held in two large, forged, Elektron magnesium alloy Y-shaped legs, one per side straddling the engine block, which were cantilevered from the firewall. Each of the legs was secured by two quick-release screw fittings on the firewall. All of the main pipe connections were colour-coded and grouped in one place, where possible, and electrical equipment plugged into junction boxes mounted on the firewall. The entire powerplant could be removed or replaced as a unit in a matter of minutes, a potential step to the eventual adoption of the unitized-powerplant Kraftei engine mounting concept used by many German combat aircraft designs, later in the war years.

Another example of the Bf 109's advanced design was the use of a single, I-beam main spar in the wing, positioned more aft than usual (to give enough room for the retracted wheel), thus forming a stiff D-shaped torsion box. Most aircraft of the era used two spars, near the front and rear edges of the wings, but the D-box was much stiffer torsionally, and eliminated the need for the rear spar. The wing profile was the NACA 2R1 14.2 at the root and NACA 2R1 11.35 at the tip, with a thickness to chord ratio of 14.2% at the root and 11.35% at the tip.

Another major difference from competing designs was the higher wing-loading. While the R-IV contract called for a wing-loading of less than 100 kg/m^{2}, Messerschmitt felt this was unreasonable. With a low wing-loading and the engines available, a fighter would end up being slower than the bombers it was tasked with catching.

A fighter was designed primarily for high-speed flight. A smaller wing area was optimal for achieving high speed, but low-speed flight would suffer, as the smaller wing would require more airflow to generate enough lift to maintain flight. To compensate for this, the Bf 109 included advanced high-lift devices on the wings, including automatically opening leading edge slats, and fairly large camber-changing flaps on the trailing edge. The slats increased the lift of the wing considerably when deployed, greatly improving the horizontal maneuverability of the aircraft, as several Luftwaffe veterans, such as Erwin Leykauf, attest.

Fighters with liquid-cooled engines were vulnerable to hits in the cooling system. For this reason, on later Bf 109 F, G and K models, the two coolant radiators were equipped with a cut-off system. If one radiator leaked, it was possible to fly on the second or to fly for at least five minutes with both closed. In 1943, Oberfeldwebel Edmund Roßmann got lost and landed behind Soviet lines. He agreed to show the Soviets how to service the plane. Soviet machine gun technician Viktor M. Sinaisky recalled:

The Messer was a very well designed plane. First, it had an engine of an inverted type, so it could not be knocked out from below. It also had two water radiators with a cut-off system: if one radiator leaked you could fly on the second or close both down and fly at least five minutes more. The pilot was protected by armour-plate from the back, and the fuel tank was also behind armour. Our planes had fuel tanks in the centre of their wings: that's why our pilot got burnt. What else did I like about the Messer? It was highly automatic and thus easy to fly. It also employed an electrical pitch regulator, which our planes didn't have. Our propeller system, with variable pitch was hydraulic, making it impossible to change pitch without engine running. If, God forbid, you turned off the engine at high pitch, it was impossible to turn the propeller and was very hard to start the engine again. Finally, the German ammo counter was also a great thing.

=== Armament and gondola cannons ===
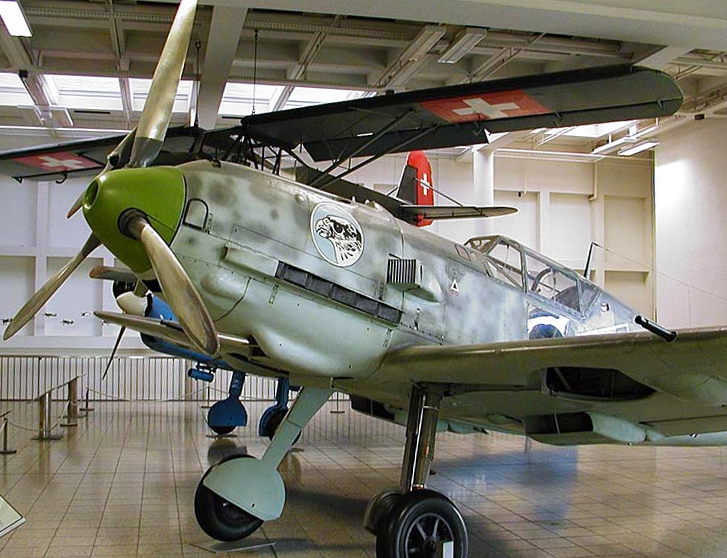
A Bf 109E-3 of JG 51 'Mölders' in the Deutsches Museum in Munich, showing the 20 mm MG FF installations in the wing.

Reflecting Messerschmitt's belief in low-weight, low-drag, simple monoplanes, the armament was placed in the fuselage. This kept the wings very thin and light. Two synchronized machine guns were mounted in the cowling, firing over the top of the engine and through the propeller arc. An alternative arrangement was also designed, consisting of a single autocannon firing through a blast tube between the cylinder banks of the engine, known as a Motorkanone mount in German. (Note: The engine's mass helped buffer the recoil. British reports on captured DB 601 series engines describe "a double-walled cannon tube housing" as part of the crankcase. Few if any Bf 109s used weapons firing through the propeller hub before the F-series, which mounted 15 mm (.59 in) and 20 mm weapons.) This was also the choice of armament layout on some contemporary monoplane fighters, such as the French Dewoitine D.520, or the American Bell P-39 Airacobra, and dated back to World War I's small run of SPAD S.XII moteur-canon, 37 mm cannon-armed fighters in France.

When it was discovered in 1937 that the RAF was planning eight-gun batteries for its new Hawker Hurricane and Supermarine Spitfire fighters, it was decided that the Bf 109 should be more heavily armed. The problem was that the only place available to mount additional guns was in the wings. Only one spot was available in each wing, between the wheel well and slats, with room for only one gun, either a 7.92 mm MG 17 machine gun, a 20 mm MG FF or a 20 mm MG FF/M cannon.

The first version of the Bf 109 to have wing guns was the C-1, which had one MG 17 in each wing. To avoid redesigning the wing to accommodate large ammunition boxes and access hatches, an unusual ammunition feed was devised whereby a continuous belt holding 500 rounds was fed along chutes out to the wing tip, around a roller, and then back along the wing, forward and beneath the gun breech, to the wing root, where it coursed around another roller and back to the weapon.

The gun barrel was placed in a long, large-diameter tube located between the spar and the leading edge. The tube channeled cooling air around the barrel and breech, exhausting from a slot at the rear of the wing. The installation was so cramped that parts of the MG 17's breech mechanism extended into an opening created in the flap structure.

The much longer and heavier MG FF had to be mounted farther along the wing in an outer bay. A large hole was cut through the spar allowing the cannon to be fitted with the ammunition feed forward of the spar, while the breech block projected rearward through the spar. A 60-round ammunition drum was placed in a space closer to the wing root causing a bulge in the underside. A small hatch was incorporated in the bulge to allow access for changing the drum. The entire weapon could be removed for servicing by removing a leading edge panel.

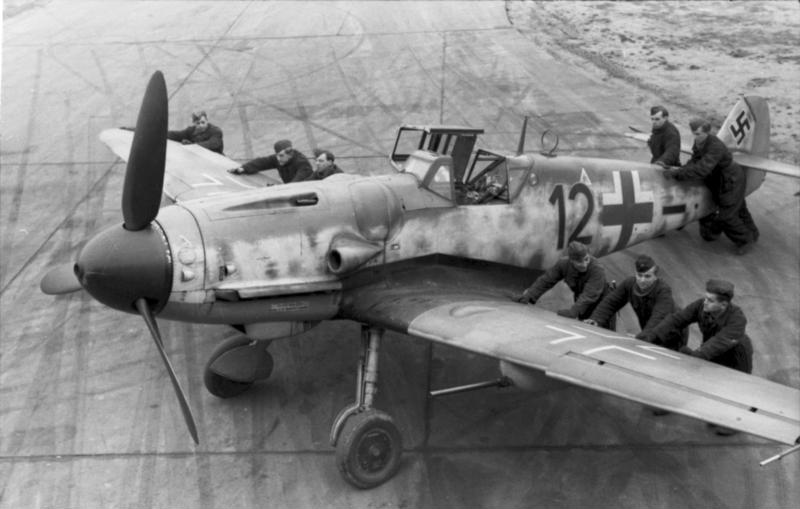
Luftwaffe ground-crew positioning a Bf 109G-6 equipped with the Rüstsatz VI underwing gondola cannon kit. Note the slat on the leading edge of the port wing. JG 2, France, late 1943.

From the 109F-series onwards, guns were no longer carried inside the wings. Instead, the Bf 109F had a 20 mm gun firing through the propeller shaft. The change was disliked by leading fighter pilots such as Adolf Galland and Walter Oesau, but others such as Werner Mölders considered the single nose-mounted gun to compensate well for the loss of the two wing guns. Galland had his Bf 109F-2 field-modified with a 20 mm MG FF/M autocannon, the "/M" suffix indicating the capability of firing thin-walled 20mm mine shells, installed internally in each wing. (Note: Galland also flew another F-2/U1 in which the MG 17s above the engine were replaced by 13 mm MG 131s)

In place of internal wing armament, additional firepower was provided through a pair of 20 mm MG 151/20 cannons installed in conformal gun pods under the wings. The conformal gun pods, exclusive of ammunition, weighed 135 kg (298 lb); and 135 to 145 rounds were provided per gun. The total weight, including ammunition, was 215 kg. Installation of the under-wing gun pods was a simple task that could be quickly performed by the unit's armourers, and the gun pods imposed a reduction of speed of only 8 km/h (5.0 mph). By comparison, the installed weight of a similar armament of two 20 mm MG 151/20 cannon inside the wings of the Fw 190A-4/U8 was 130 kg (287 lb), without ammunition.

Although the additional armament increased the fighter's potency as a bomber destroyer, it had an adverse effect on the handling qualities, reducing its performance in fighter-versus-fighter combat and accentuating the tendency of the fighter to swing pendulum-fashion in flight.

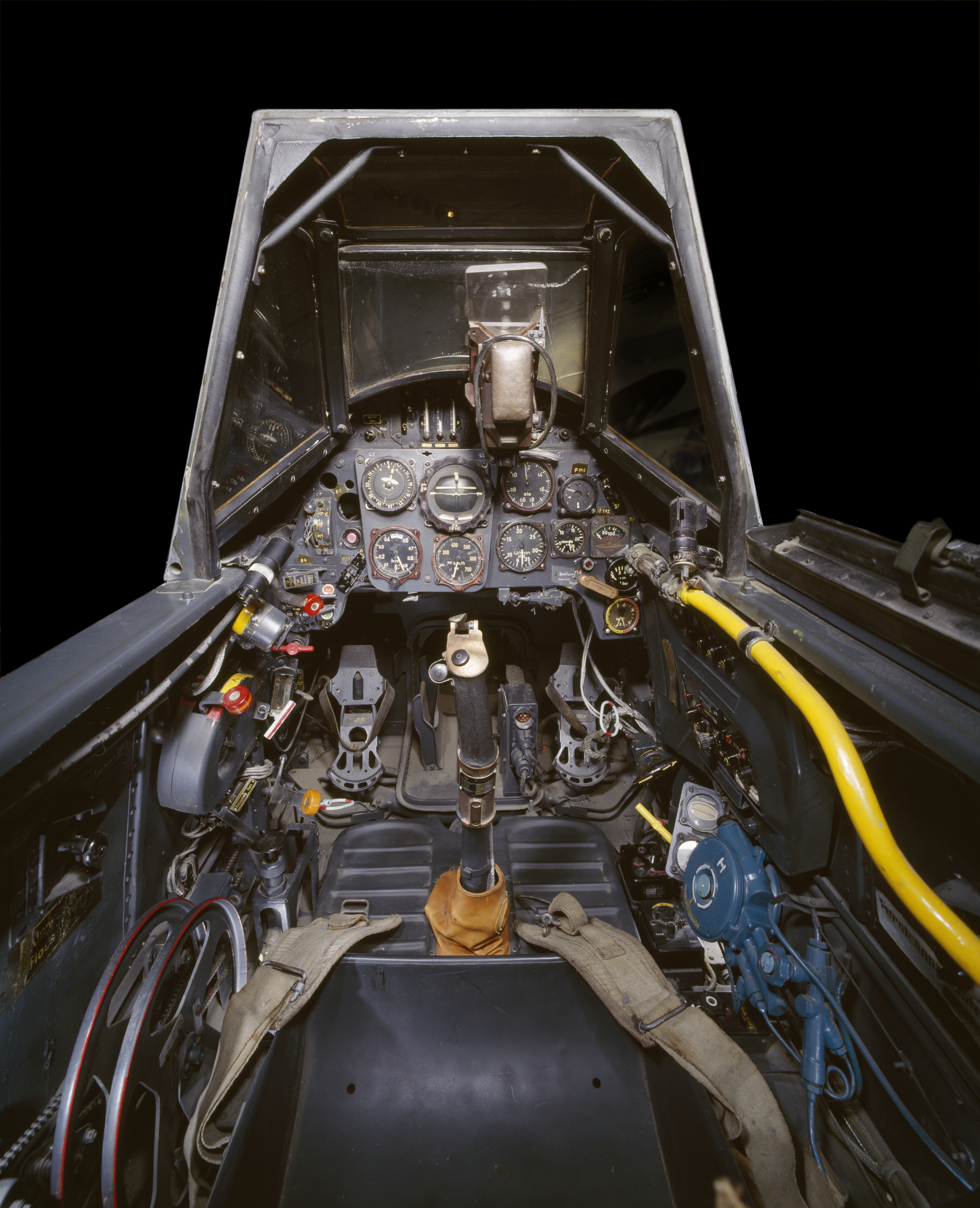
Bf-109 G-6/R3 Cockpit

Some of the projected 109K-series models, such as the K-6, were designed to carry 30 mm (1.18 in) MK 108 cannons in the wings.

=== Designation and nicknames ===
Originally the aircraft was designated as Bf 109 by the RLM, since the design was submitted by the Bayerische Flugzeugwerke (literally "Bavarian Aircraft Works", meaning "Bavarian Aircraft Factory"; sometimes abbreviated B.F.W., akin to BMW) during 1935. The company was renamed Messerschmitt AG after 11 July 1938 when Erhard Milch finally allowed Willy Messerschmitt to acquire the company. All Messerschmitt aircraft that originated after that date, such as the Me 210, were to carry the "Me" designation. Despite regulations by the RLM, wartime documents from Messerschmitt AG, RLM and Luftwaffe loss and strength reports continued to use both designations, sometimes even on the same page.

All extant airframes bear the official "Bf 109" designation on their identification plates, including the final K-4 models. The aircraft was often referred to by the folk-designation, 'Me 109', particularly by the Allies.

The aircraft was often nicknamed Messer by its operators and opponents alike; the name was not only an abbreviation of the manufacturer but also the German word for "knife". In Finland, the Bf 109 was known as Mersu, although this was originally (and still is) the Finnish nickname for Mercedes-Benz cars.

Soviet aviators nicknamed the Bf 109 "the skinny one" (худо́й, khudoy), for its sleek appearance compared, for example, to the more robust Fw 190.

The names "Anton", "Berta", "Caesar", "Dora", "Emil", "Friedrich", "Gustav", and "Kurfürst" were derived from the variant's official letter designation (e.g. Bf 109G – "Gustav"), based on the German spelling alphabet of World War II, a practice that was also used for other German aircraft designs. The G-6 variant was nicknamed by Luftwaffe personnel as Die Beule ("the bump/bulge") because of the cowling's characteristic, bulging covers for the breeches of the 13 mm (.51 in) MG 131 machine guns, with the separate Beule covers eliminated by the time of the G-10 model's introduction of a subtly reshaped upper cowling.

=== Record-setting flights ===
Bf 109G-10 (Messerschmitt foundation) flight demonstration

In July 1937, not long after the public debut of the new fighter, three Bf 109Bs took part in the Flugmeeting airshow in Zürich under the command of Major Seidemann. They won in several categories: First prize in a speed race over a 202 km course, first prize in the class A category in the international Alpenrundflug for military aircraft, and victory in the international Patrouillenflug category.

On 11 November 1937, the Bf 109 V13, D-IPKY flown by Messerschmitt's chief pilot Dr. Hermann Wurster, powered by a 1,230 kW (1,672 PS; 1,649 hp) DB 601R racing engine, set a new world air speed record for landplanes with piston engines of 610.95 km/h (379.63 mph), the first time Germany had set the record. Converted from a Bf 109D, the V13 had been fitted with a special racing DB 601R engine that could deliver 1,230 kW (1,672 PS; 1,649 hp) for short periods. (Note: World speed records and other aviation records were and still are set by the Fédération Aéronautique Internationale (FAI). A record attempt must be made over a recognized course at a set altitude to be considered. The Bf 109 and 209s came under the category "CLASS C, GROUP 1d""FAI record (current)." fai.org. Retrieved: 29 April 2008.) Both the FAI and contemporary publications, such as Flight, have recorded this aircraft as a Messerschmitt Bf 113 (or Bf 113R).

Heinkel, having had the He 112 rejected in the design competition of 1936, designed and built the He 100. On 6 June 1938, the He 100 V3, flown by Ernst Udet, captured the record with a speed of 634.7 km/h (394.4 mph). On 30 March 1939, test pilot Hans Dieterle surpassed that record, reaching 746.61 km/h (463.92 mph) with the He 100 V8. Messerschmitt, however, soon regained the lead when, on 26 April 1939, Flugkapitän Fritz Wendel, flying the Me 209 V1, set a new record of 755.14 km/h (469.22 mph). For propaganda purposes, the Me 209 V1 aircraft (possibly from its post-July 1938 first flight date) was given the designation Me 109R, with the later prefix, never used for wartime Bf 109 fighters. The Me 209 V1 was powered by the DB 601ARJ, producing 1,156 kW (1,550 hp), but capable of reaching 1,715 kW (2,300 hp). This world record for a piston-engined aircraft was to stand until 1969, when Darryl Greenamyer's modified Grumman F8F Bearcat, Conquest I, broke it with a 777 km/h (483 mph) record speed.

== Variants ==
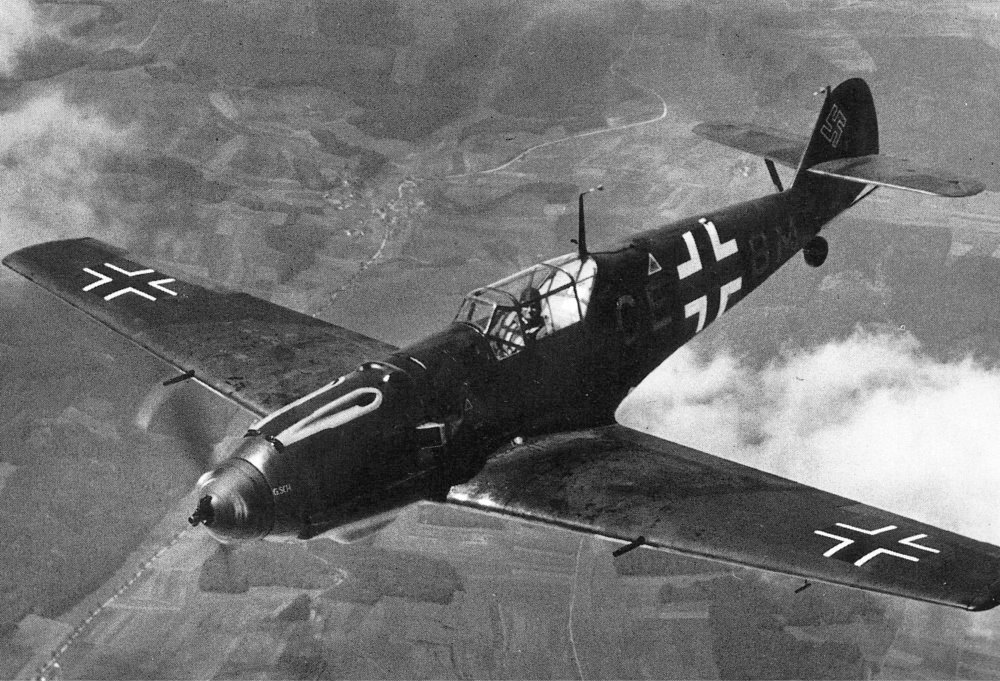
Bf 109E-3 in flight, 1940

When the Bf 109 was designed in 1934, by a team led by Willy Messerschmitt and Robert Lusser, its primary role was that of a high-speed, short-range interceptor. It used the most advanced aerodynamics of the time and embodied advanced structural design which was ahead of its contemporaries. In the early years of the war, the Bf 109 was the only single-engined fighter operated by the Luftwaffe, until the appearance of the Fw 190. The Bf 109 remained in production from 1937 through 1945 in many different variants and sub-variants. The primary engines used were the Daimler-Benz DB 601 and DB 605, though the Junkers Jumo 210 powered most of the pre-war variants. The most-produced Bf 109 model was the Bf 109G series (more than a third of all 109s built were the G-6 series, 12,000 units being manufactured from March 1943 until the end of the war). The initial production models of the A, B, C and D series were powered by the relatively low-powered, 670–700 PS (493–515 kW; 661–690 hp) Junkers Jumo 210 series engines. A few prototypes of these early aircraft were converted to use the more powerful DB 600.

The first redesign came with the E series, including the naval variant, the Bf 109T (T standing for Träger, carrier). The Bf 109E (Emil) introduced structural changes to accommodate the heavier and more powerful 1,100 PS (809 kW; 1,085 hp) Daimler-Benz DB 601 engine, heavier armament and increased fuel capacity. Partly due to its limited 300 kilometres (190 miles) combat radius on internal fuel alone, resulting from its 660 km (410 mi) range limit, later variants of the E series had a fuselage ordnance rack for fighter-bomber operations or provision for a long-range, standardized 300 litres (79 US gallons) drop-tank and used the DB 601N engine of higher power output. The Bf 109E first saw service with the "Condor Legion" during the last phase of the Spanish Civil War and was the main variant from the beginning of World War II until mid-1941 when the Bf 109F replaced it in the pure fighter role. (Eight Bf 109Es were assembled in Switzerland in 1946 by the Dornier-Werke, using licence-built airframes; a ninth airframe was assembled using spare parts.)

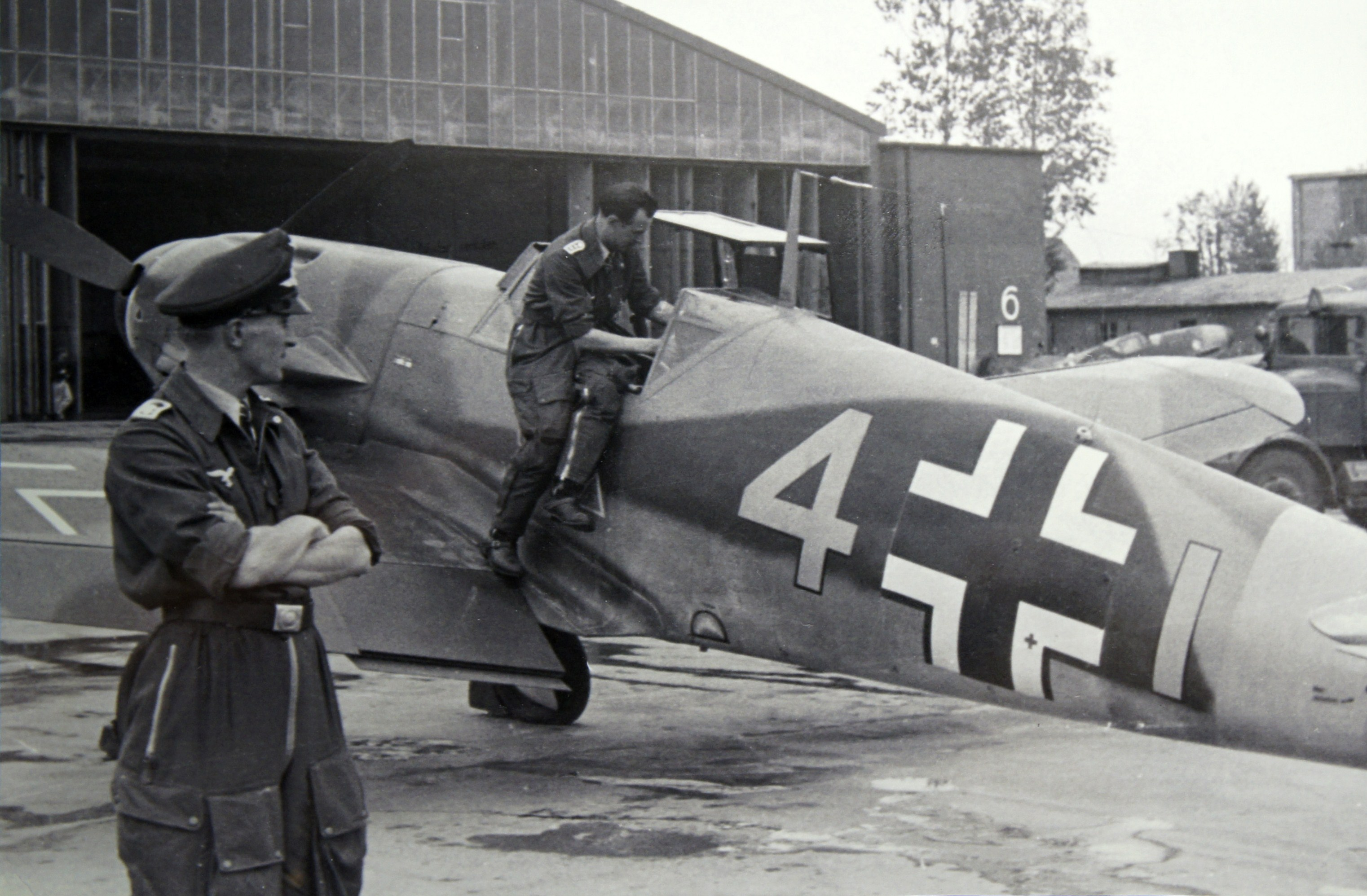
Bf 109F-4 of JG 3 near Reims, France

The second big redesign during 1939–40 gave birth to the F series. The Friedrich had new wings, cooling system and fuselage aerodynamics, with the 1,175 PS (864 kW; 1,159 hp) DB 601N (F-1, F-2) or the 1,350 PS (993 kW; 1,332 hp) DB 601E (F-3, F-4). Considered by many as the high-water mark of Bf 109 development, the F series abandoned the wing cannon and concentrated all armament in the forward fuselage with a pair of synchronized machine guns above and a single 15 or 20 mm Motorkanone-mount cannon behind the engine, the latter firing between the cylinder banks and through the propeller hub, itself covered by a more streamlined, half-elliptical shaped spinner that better matched the streamlining of the reshaped cowling, abandoning the smaller, conical spinner of the Emil subtype. The F-type also omitted the earlier stabilizer lift strut on either side of the tail. The improved aerodynamics were used by all later variants. Some Bf 109Fs were used late in the Battle of Britain in 1940 but the variant came into common use only in the first half of 1941.

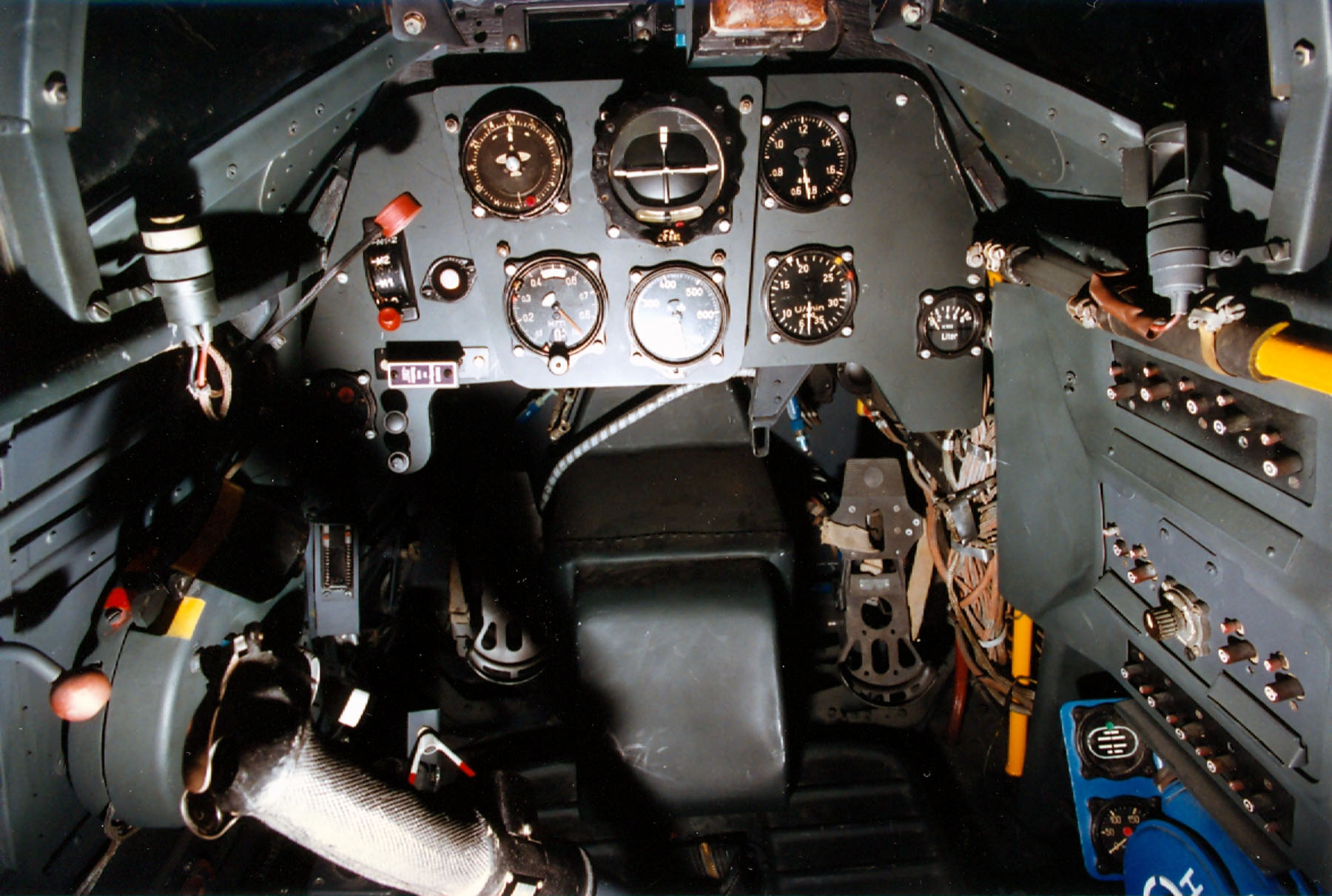
Bf 109 Gustav cockpit

The G series, or Gustav, introduced in mid-1942, was the most mass produced variant of the 109. Its initial variants (G-1 through G-4) differed only in minor details from the Bf 109F, most notably in the more powerful 1,475 PS (1,085 kW; 1,455 hp) DB 605 engine. Odd-numbered variants were built as high-altitude fighters with a pressurized cockpit and GM-1 boost, while even-numbered variants were un-pressurized, air superiority fighters and fighter-bombers. Long-range photo-reconnaissance variants also existed. The later G series (G-5 through G-14) was produced in a multitude of variants, with uprated armament and provision for kits of packaged, generally factory-installed parts known as Umrüst-Bausätze ("conversion kits", usually contracted to Umbau) and adding a "/U" suffix to the aircraft designation when installed. Field kits known as Rüstsätze were also available for the G-series but those did not change the aircraft title. By early 1944, tactical requirements resulted in the addition of MW-50 water injection boost and high-performance superchargers, boosting engine output to 1,800–2,000 PS (1,324–1,471 kW; 1,775–1,973 hp). From early 1944, some G-2s, G-3s, G-4s and G-6s were converted to two-seat trainers, known as G-12s. An instructor's cockpit was added behind the original cockpit and both were covered by an elongated, glazed canopy.

The final production version of the Bf 109 was the K series or Kurfürst, introduced in late 1944, powered by the DB 605D engine with up to 2,000 PS (1,471 kW; 1,973 hp). Though externally akin to the late production Bf 109G series, a large number of internal changes and aerodynamic improvements were incorporated that improved its effectiveness and remedied flaws, keeping it competitive with the latest Allied and Soviet fighters. The Bf 109's outstanding rate of climb was superior to many Allied adversaries including the P-51D Mustang, Spitfire Mk. XIV and Hawker Tempest Mk. V.

After the war, the 109 was built in Czechoslovakia, as the Avia S-99 and Avia S-199 (with twenty-five S-199s serving with Israel in 1948) and in Spain as the Hispano Aviación Ha 1109 and Ha 1112.

== Production ==
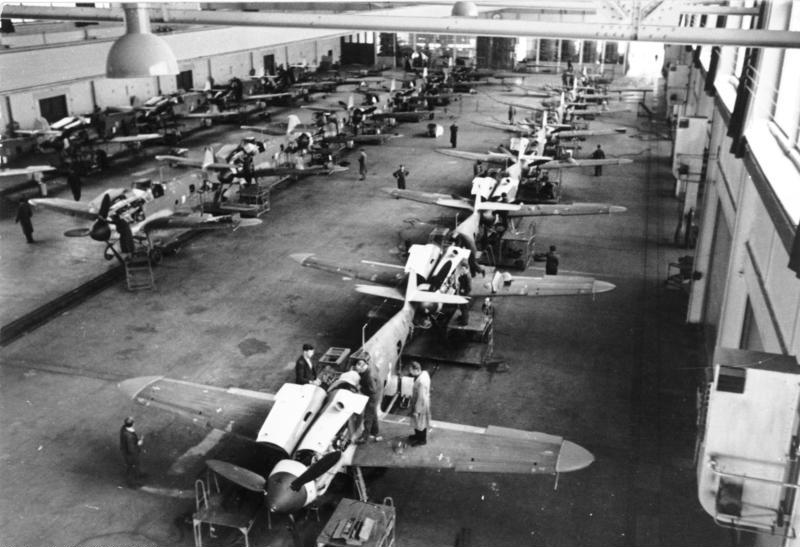
Assembly of Bf 109G-6s in a German aircraft factory.

Total Bf 109 production was 33,984 units; wartime production (September 1939 to May 1945) was 30,573 units. Fighter production totalled 47% of all German aircraft production, and the Bf 109 accounted for 57% of all German fighter types produced. A total of 2,193 Bf 109 A–E was built prewar, from 1936 to August 1939.

In January 1943, as part of an effort to increase fighter production, Messerschmitt licensed an SS-owned company, DEST, to manufacture Bf 109 parts at Flossenbürg concentration camp. Messerschmitt provided skilled technicians, raw materials, and tools and the SS provided prisoners, in a deal that proved highly profitable for both parties. Production at Flossenbürg started in February. The number of prisoners working for Messerschmitt increased greatly after the bombing of Messerschmitt's Regensburg plant on 17 August 1943. Erla, a subcontractor of Messerschmitt, established Flossenbürg subcamps to support its production: a subcamp at Johanngeorgenstadt, established in December 1943, to produce tailplanes for the Bf 109, and another subcamp at Mülsen-St. Micheln which produced Bf 109 wings, in January 1944. The Flossenbürg camp system had become a key supplier of Bf 109 parts by February 1944, when Messerschmitt's Regensburg plant was bombed again during "Big Week". Increased production at Flossenbürg was essential to restoring production in the aftermath of the attacks.

The Austrian resistance group, led by Heinrich Maier, very successfully passed on plans and production facilities in the Austrian area for Messerschmitt Bf 109 to the Allies from 1943. With the location of the production sites, the Allied bombers were able to attempt "precise" air strikes.

After the August 1943 Regensburg raid, some Bf 109 production was relocated to Gusen concentration camp in Austria, where the average prisoner's life expectancy was six months. In order to make the new production facilities bomb-proof, other prisoners were forced to build tunnels so that production could be relocated underground. Many died while performing this hazardous duty. By mid-1944, more than a third of the production at the Regensburg factory originated in Flossenbürg and Gusen alone; only the final assembly was done in Regensburg. Separately, Erla employed thousands of concentration camp prisoners at Buchenwald on 109 production. Forced labor at Buchenwald produced approximately 300 Bf 109 fuselages, tail sections, and wings before the end of the war.

Some 865 Bf 109G derivatives were manufactured postwar under licence as Czechoslovak-built Avia S-99 and S-199s, with the production ending in 1948. Production of the Spanish-built Hispano Aviación HA-1109 and HA-1112 Buchons ended in 1958.

New-production Messerschmitt Bf 109 fighters, 1936–45.
Factory, location	Up to 1939	1939	1940	1941	1942	1943	1944	1945*	Totals*
Messerschmitt GmbH, Regensburg				203	486	2,164	6,329	1,241	10,423
Arado, Warnemünde				370					370
Erla Maschinenwerk, Leipzig				683	875	2,015	4,472	1,018	9,063
Gerhard-Fieseler-Werke, Kassel				155					155
W.N.F., Wiener Neustadt				836	1,297	2,200	3,081	541	7,955
Győri Vagon- és Gépgyár, Győr					4	220	399 (Note: Produced from 1943 sept until 1944 sept)	10	633
AGO, Oschersleben (switched to Fw 190A production)				381					381
Totals	1,860	1,540	1,868	2,628	2,662	6,609	14,281	2,800	34,248

* Production up to end of March 1945 only.

Variant	Number	Years produced
Bf 109A	22	1937 - 1938
Bf 109B	341	1937 - 1938
Bf 109C	58	1938 spring - 1938 late
Bf 109D	647	1938 - 1939
Bf 109E-1	1,183	1938 late - 1940
Bf 109E-3	1,276	1939 - 1940
Bf 109E-4	561	1939 - 1940
Bf 109E-5	19	1939 - 1940
Bf 109E-7	438	1940 August - 1941
Bf 109F-1	208	1940 July - 1941 January
Bf 109F-2	1,384	1940 October - 1941 August
Bf 109F-3	15	1940 October - 1941 January
Bf 109F-4	1,841	1941 May - 1942 May
Bf 109F-5	1	1940 October
Bf 109G-1	167	1942 February - June
Bf 109G-2	1,587	1942 May - 1943 February
Bf 109G-3	50	1943 January
Bf 109G-4	1,246	1942 September - 1943 May
Bf 109G-5	475	1943 February - 1944 June
Bf 109G-5/AS	16 converted	1944 April - 1944 June
Bf 109G-6	~5000+	1943 February-1943 August - October
Bf 109G-6 with Erla Hood	~2000+	1943 August - Sept - 1944 March
Bf 109G-6 with Erla Hood, larger tail, and MW-50	~5,000+	1944 January - 1944 Sept (Note: First entered service in 1944 Late April–May with MW-50)
Bf 109G-6/AS with MW-50	226 produced + 460 converted	1944 April - 1944 August (Note: First entered service in 1944 Late April–May)
Bf 109G-8	906	1943 August-1945 February
Bf 109G-10	2,600+ (Note: Many of the G-10s are converted from older G-6/14s.)	1944 September - 1945 March (Note: First entered service in 1944 Mid-October)
Bf 109G-10/AS	100 (Note: It's not clear, these planes were G-6/AS with DB-605 ASM engine or genuine G-10s with DB-605 DB. Officially there was no G-10/AS produced in the factories.)	1944 September - 1944 November (Note: First entered service in 1944 Mid-October)
Bf 109G-12	500 planned (Note: The exact number of Bf 109G-12s built is unknown as war-weary G-2, G-4, and G-6 airframes were converted or rebuilt to produce this variant.)/converted	1943 December - 1944 July
Bf 109G-14	5,500+	1944 July - 1945 February
Bf 109G-14/AS	~1,373+	1944 July - 1945 March
Bf 109K-4	1,700+	1944 August - 1945 March (Note: First entered service in 1944 Early-October)
Bf 109K-6	1 prototype	1944 Autumn
Totals	36,901 with conversions	-

== Operational history ==
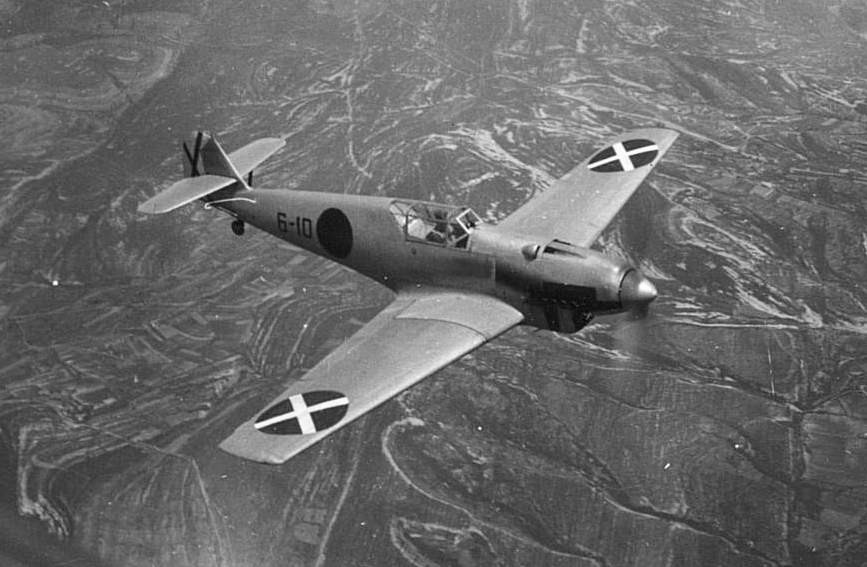
Bf 109A from the Condor Legion during Spanish Civil War (1936–1939)

The first Bf 109As served in the Spanish Civil War. By September 1939, the Bf 109 had become the main fighter of the Luftwaffe, replacing the biplane fighters, and was instrumental in gaining air superiority for the Wehrmacht during the early stages of the war. During the Battle of Britain, it was pressed into the role of escort fighter, a role for which it was not originally designed, and it was widely employed as a fighter-bomber, as well as a photo-reconnaissance platform. Despite mixed results over Britain, with the introduction of the improved Bf 109F in early 1941, the type again proved to be an effective fighter during the Invasion of Yugoslavia (where it was used by both sides), the Battle of Crete, Operation Barbarossa (the invasion of the USSR) and the Siege of Malta.

In 1942, it began to be partially replaced in Western Europe by a new German fighter, the Focke-Wulf Fw 190, but it continued to serve in a multitude of roles on the Eastern Front and in the Defense of the Reich, as well as in the Mediterranean Theatre of Operations and with Erwin Rommel's Afrikakorps. It was also supplied to several of Germany's allies, including Italy, Finland, Hungary, Romania, Bulgaria, Croatia and Slovakia.

More aerial kills were made with the Bf 109 than any other aircraft of World War II. Many of the aerial victories were accomplished against poorly trained and badly organized Soviet forces in 1941 during Barbarossa. The Soviets lost 21,200 aircraft, about half to combat. If shot down, the Luftwaffe pilots might land or parachute to friendly territory and return to fight again. Later in the war, when Allied victories began to bring the fight closer, and then in German territory, bombing raids supplied plenty of targets for the Luftwaffe. This unique combination of events — until American long-range fighters appeared very early in 1944, that steadily gave the Allies daylight air supremacy over the Reich — led to the highest-ever individual pilot victory scores. One hundred and five Bf 109 pilots were each credited with the destruction of 100 or more enemy aircraft. (Note: Some sources state one hundred and nine pilots were credited with more than 100 enemy aircraft.) Thirteen of these men scored more than 200 kills, while two scored more than 300. Altogether, this group of pilots was credited with a total of nearly 15,000 kills. Though no official "ace" status existed in the Luftwaffe - the term Experte (expert) was used for an experienced pilot irrespective of his number of kills - using the Allied definition of pilots who scored five or more kills, more than 2,500 Luftwaffe fighter pilots were considered aces in World War II. Against the Soviets, Finnish-flown Bf 109Gs claimed a victory ratio of 25:1.

Bf 109s remained in foreign service for many years after the war. The Bf109 was the first aircraft deployed at the beginning of the Israeli Air Force. The Swiss used their Bf 109Gs well into the 1950s. The Finnish Air Force did not retire their Bf 109Gs until March 1954. Romania used its Bf 109s until 1955. The Spanish Hispanos flew even longer, some still in service in the late 1960s. They appeared in films (notably Battle of Britain) playing the role of Bf 109Es; some Hispano airframes were sold to museums, which rebuilt them as Bf 109s.

== Operators ==
Note: this list includes operators who used Bf 109s for active service or combat. It does not include France, the Soviet Union, the United Kingdom, and the United States, which all operated small numbers of captured aircraft for testing and evaluation (see: Messerschmitt Bf 109 operational history#Allied Bf 109s).

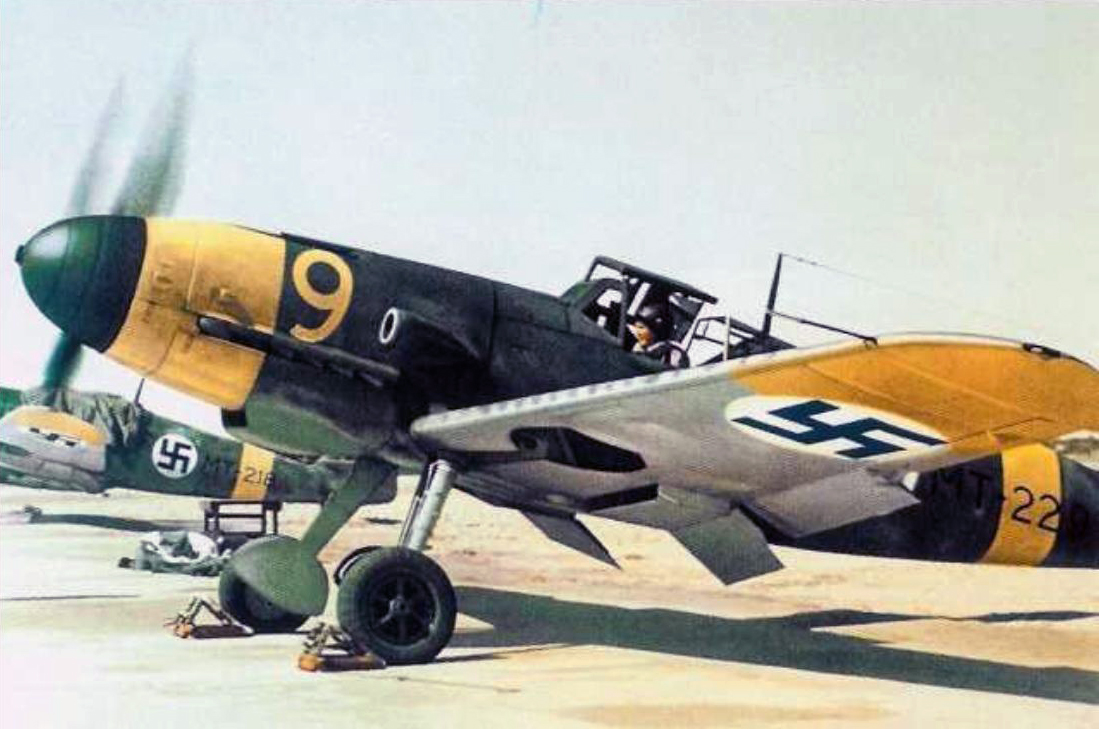
Finnish Messerschmitt Bf 109G-2s at Helsinki-Malmi, June 1943

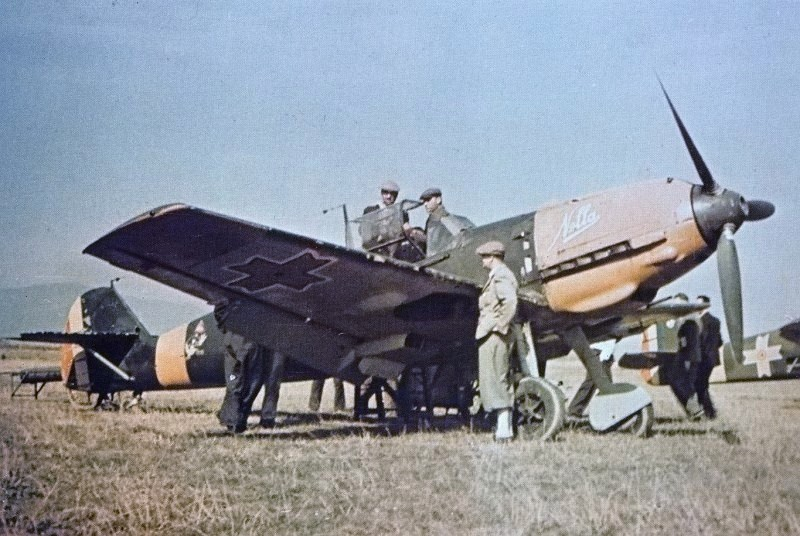
Romanian Bf 109E-3

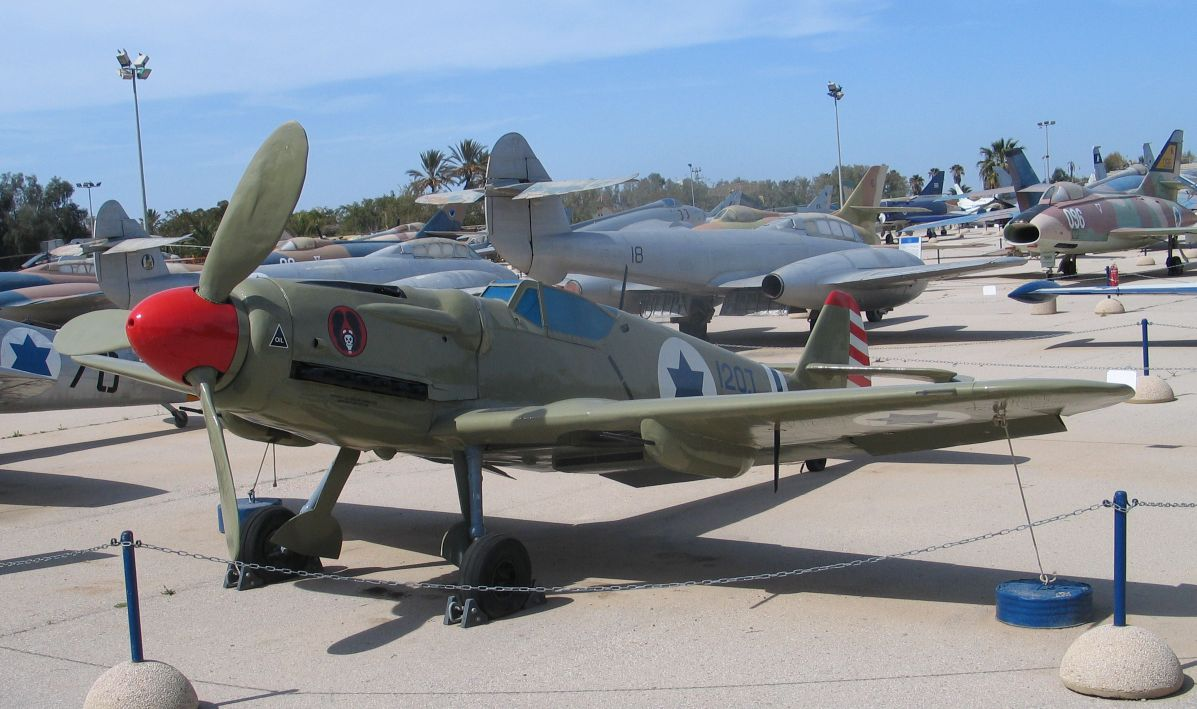
Czechoslovak-built Israeli AF Avia S-199 at Israeli Air Force Museum

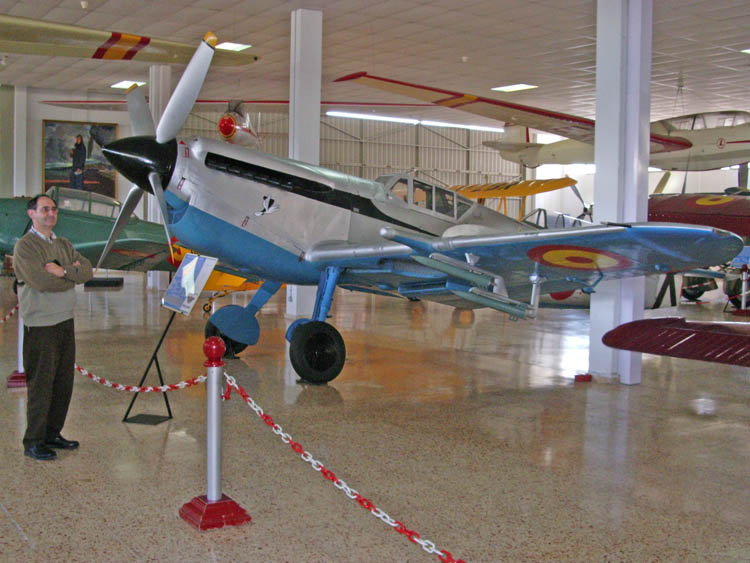
Hispano Aviación HA-1112 Buchon

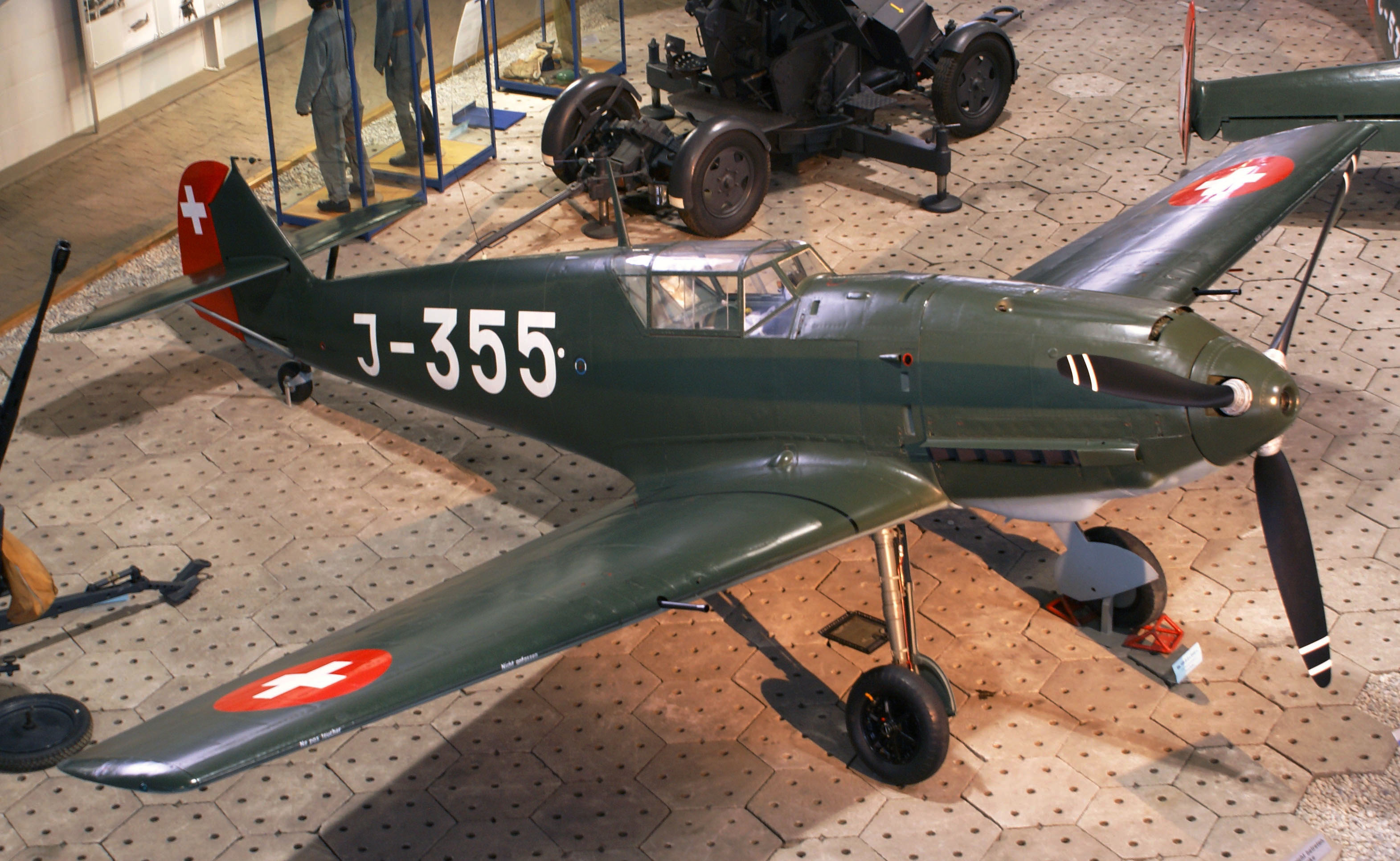
A Bf 109E-3 of the Swiss Air Force at the Flieger-Flab-Museum

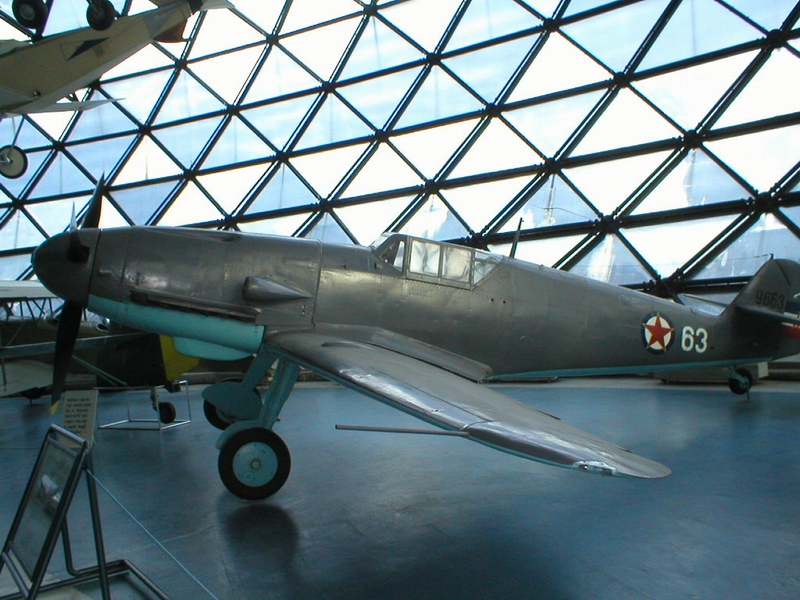
Yugoslav AF Bf 109G-2, at the Aeronautical Museum Belgrade

Bulgaria

- The Bulgarian Air Force operated 19 E-3s and 145 G-2/-6/-10s.

Croatia

- Zrakoplovstvo Nezavisne Države Hrvatske operated over 50 Bf 109s, including E-4, F-2, G-2/-6/-10 and Ks.

Czechoslovakia – (captured)

- Czechoslovak Air Force operated captured aircraft and continued building Messerschmitt Bf 109Gs after the war under the Avia S-99 name, but soon ran out of the 109's Daimler-Benz DB 605 engine after many were destroyed during an explosion at a warehouse in Krásné Březno.

Finland

- Finnish Air Force ordered 162 aircraft (48 G-2s, 111 G-6s and three G-8s) from Germany, but 3 were destroyed during transit, leaving the FAF with 159 Bf 109s. FAF pilots had 663 air victories during 1943–44 with Bf 109 G's and lost 34 in combat (20 shot down by enemy aircraft). 23 were non-combat losses and other write-offs. 102 Bf 109 G survived the war.

Greece – (captured)

- Royal Hellenic Air Force operated a number of captured G-6 109s which had been left during the German withdrawal in October 1944.

Nazi Germany

- Luftwaffe was the main operator of the Bf 109.

Kingdom of Hungary

- Royal Hungarian Air Force operated 3 D-1s, 50 E-3/-4s, 66 F-4s and ~490 G-2/-4/-6/-8/-10/-14s.

Israel

- Israeli Air Force operated the Avia S-199 derivative, bought from Czechoslovakia. Despite the type's shortcomings the Israelis scored 8 victories. Egypt and Syria claimed 4 S-199 kills, and 1 probable.

Italy

- Regia Aeronautica operated several tens of Bf 109s in the first half of 1943.

Italian Social Republic

- Aeronautica Nazionale Repubblicana operated 300 G-6/-10/-14s and two G-12s; three K-4s were also received.

Empire of Japan

- Imperial Japanese Army Air Force purchased 5 E-7s in 1941. The aircraft were used for tests and trials.

Romania

- Royal Romanian Air Force operated 50 E-3/4s, 19 E-7s, 2 F-2s, 5 F-4s and at least 200+ G-2/G-4/G-6/-8s plus 124 IAR assembled Ga-2/Ga-4/Ga-6.
- Romanian Air Force – Postwar.

Slovak Republic (1939 - 1945)

- Slovak Air Force operated 16 E-3s, 14 E-7s and 30 G-6s.
- Slovak Insurgent Air Force operated 3 G-6s during the Slovak National Uprising.

Spanish State

- Spanish Air Force operated some D-1s, E-3s and 15 F-4s, and may have received several older B-types. Volunteers of Escuadrilla Azul on the Eastern Front operated E-4, E-7, E-7/B, F-2, F-4 (belonged in JG-27 under the command of Luftflotte 2, until April 1943) among G-4 and G-6 (detached in JG-51 under the command Luftflotte 4, until June 1944). A variant under license by the name Hispano Aviación HA-1112 was produced until 1958.

Switzerland

- Swiss Air Force operated 10 D-1s, 89 E-3a variants, 2 F-4s and 14 G-6s.

Turkey – (captured)

- Turkish Air Force two aircraft were confiscated after emergency landings.

Yugoslavia

- Royal Yugoslav Air Force operated 73 E-3a variants.
- SFR Yugoslav Air Force operated several ex-NDH and Bulgarian Bf 109Gs.

== Specifications (Bf 109G-6) ==
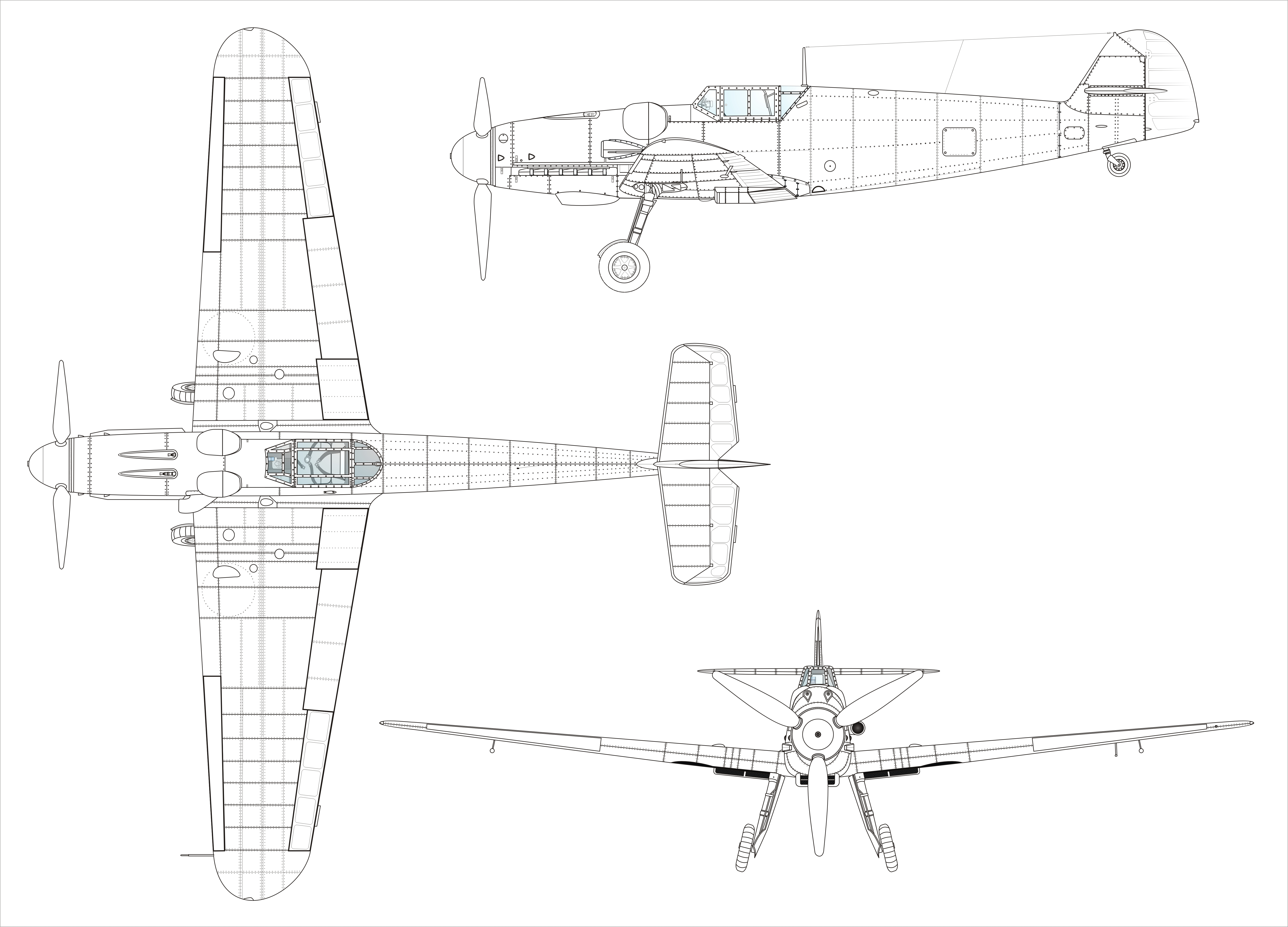
3-view drawing of Bf 109G-6.

Data from The Great Book of Fighters and the Finnish Air Force Bf 109 Manual

General characteristics

- Crew: 1
- Length: 8.95 m (29 ft 4 in)
- Wingspan: 9.925 m (32 ft 7 in)
- Height: 2.6 m (8 ft 6 in)
- Wing area: 16.05 m^{2} (172.8 sq ft)
- Airfoil: NACA 2R1 14.2; tip: NACA 2R1 11.35
- Empty weight: 2,247 kg (4,954 lb)
- Gross weight: 3,148 kg (6,940 lb)
- Max takeoff weight: 3,400 kg (7,496 lb)
- Powerplant: 1 × Daimler-Benz DB 605A-1 V-12 inverted liquid-cooled piston engine 1,475 PS (1,455 hp; 1,085 kW)
- Propellers: 3-bladed VDM 9-12087, 3 m (9 ft 10 in) diameter light-alloy constant-speed propeller

Performance

- Maximum speed: 530 km/h (330 mph, 290 kn) at sea level

588 km/h (365 mph; 317 kn) at 4,000 m (13,000 ft)
642 km/h (399 mph; 347 kn) at 6,300 m (20,700 ft)
622 km/h (386 mph; 336 kn) at 8,000 m (26,000 ft)

- Cruise speed: 590 km/h (370 mph, 320 kn) at 6,000 m (20,000 ft)
- Range: 880–1,144 km (547–711 mi, 475–618 nmi)
- Ferry range: 1,144–1,994 km (711–1,239 mi, 618–1,077 nmi) 1,144 km without and 1,994 km with droptank
- Service ceiling: 12,000 m (39,000 ft)
- Rate of climb: 22.7 m/s (4,470 ft/min)
- Wing loading: 196 kg/m^{2} (40 lb/sq ft)
- Power/mass: 0.344 kW/kg (0.209 hp/lb)

Armament

- Guns:
  - 2 × 13 mm (.51 in) synchronized MG 131 machine guns with 300 rpg
  - 1 × 20 mm (.78 in) MG 151/20 cannon as centerline Motorkanone with 200 rpg or
  - 1 x 30 mm (1.18 in) MK 108 cannon as centerline Motorkanone with 65 rpg (G-6/U4 variant)
  - 2 × 20 mm MG 151/20 underwing gondolas with 135 rpg (optional kit—Rüstsatz VI)
- Rockets: 2 × 21 cm (8 in) Wfr. Gr. 21 rockets (G-6 with BR21)
- Bombs: 1 × 250 kg (551 lb) bomb or 4 × 50 kg (110 lb) bombs or 1 × 300-litre (79 US gal) drop tank

Avionics
FuG 16Z radio

== See also ==
- Sonderkommando Elbe

Related development

- Messerschmitt Bf 108
- Messerschmitt Me 209-II
- Hispano Aviacion HA-1109
- Avia S-99/S-199
- Messerschmitt Me 309

Aircraft of comparable role, configuration, and era

- Bell P-39 Airacobra
- Dewoitine D.520
- Fiat G.55
- Hawker Hurricane
- Heinkel He 100
- Kawasaki Ki-61
- Lavochkin LaGG-3
- Macchi C.202
- Mikoyan-Gurevich MiG-3
- Morane-Saulnier MS.406
- North American P-51 Mustang
- Rogožarski IK-3
- Supermarine Spitfire
- Yakovlev Yak-1

Related lists

- List of military aircraft of Germany
- List of aircraft of World War II
- List of aircraft of Germany in World War II
