= Messerschmitt Me 309 =

German fighter prototype

Me 309
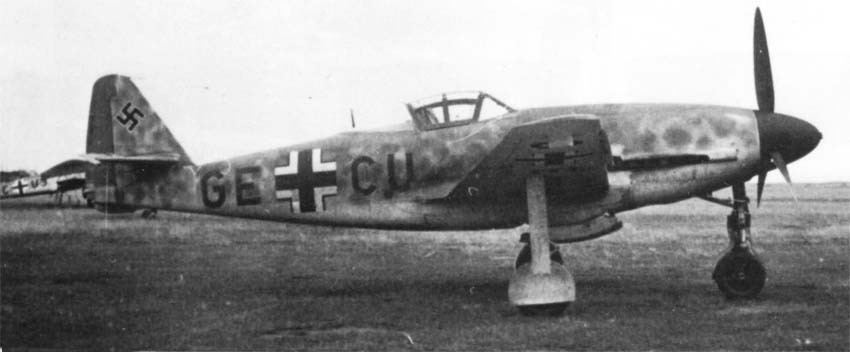
- Me 309

General information
- Type: Fighter
- Manufacturer: Messerschmitt
- Designer: Wilhelm Messerschmitt
- Status: Experimental
- Primary user: Luftwaffe
- Number built: 4

History
- First flight: 18 July 1942
- Retired: 1943
- Developed from: Messerschmitt Bf 109

The Messerschmitt Me 309 was a prototype German fighter, designed in the early years of World War II to replace the Messerschmitt Bf 109. Although the Me 309 incorporated a number of advanced features, its performance fell short of expectations, and numerous technical problems led to the cancellation of the project after only four prototypes had been built. The Me 309 was one of two failed Messerschmitt projects intended to replace the Bf 109, the other being the 1943 Me 209 project.

== Design and development ==
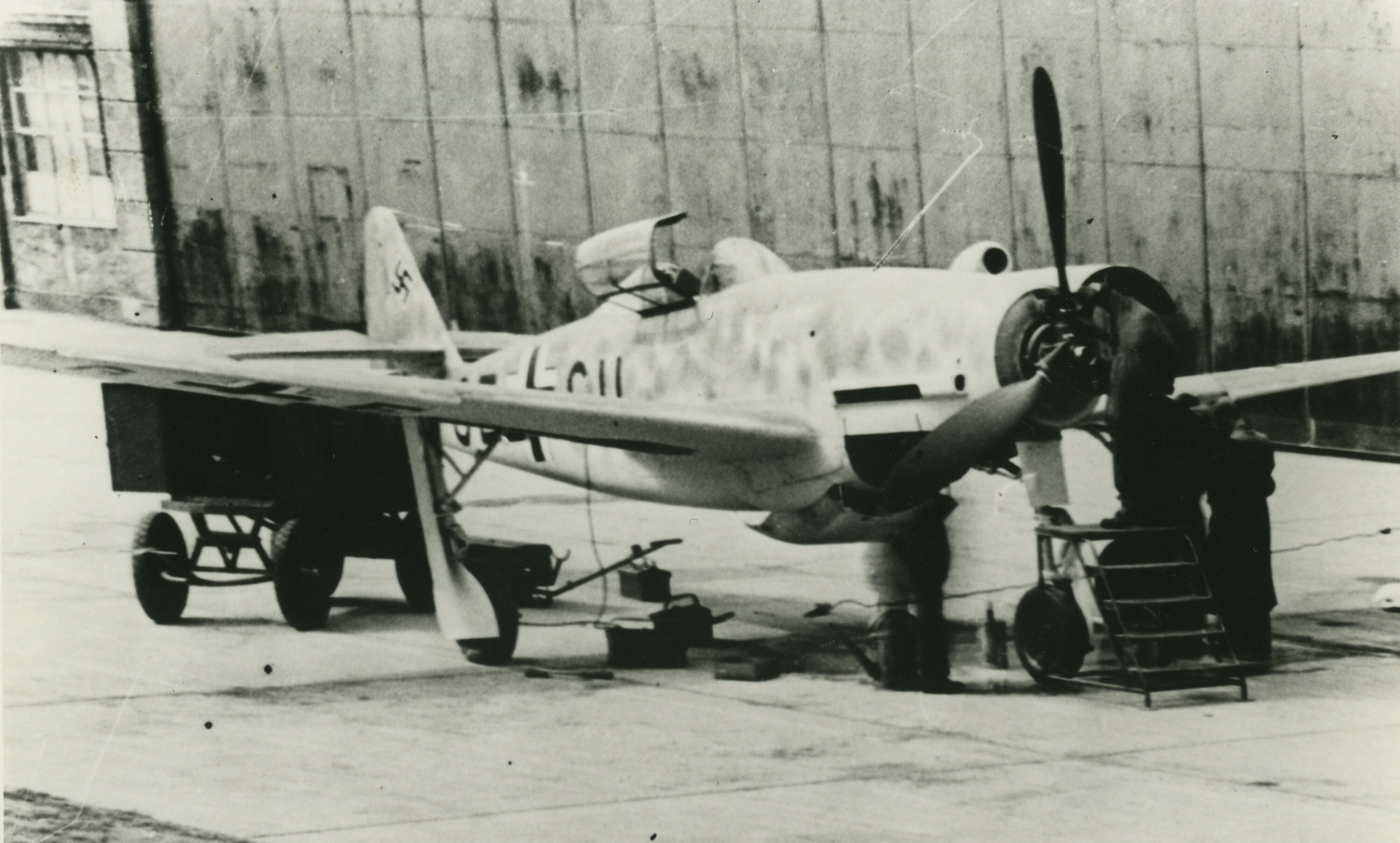
Me 309 in 1943

Messerschmitt's failure to resolve the stability and other problems of the Me 209 project during 1940 caused Willy Messerschmitt to scrap much of the earlier design work when he commissioned wind tunnel testing of new wing designs and the cockpit canopy in January 1941. Other changes included dropping the Daimler-Benz DB 601 engine and substituting tricycle landing gear for the previous tail-dragger landing gear. The revised design was formally redesignated as the Me 309 in May.

The new fighter included a pressurized cockpit, which would have given it more comfortable and effective high-altitude performance. Each of the new features was first tested on a number of Bf 109F airframes, the V23 having a ventral radiator, the V31 with a radiator and tricycle landing gear, and the V30 having a pressurized cockpit.

Low government interest in the project delayed completion of the first prototype until spring 1942, and trouble with the nosewheel pushed back the 309's first flight to July. When it did fly, the Me 309's performance was satisfactory – about 50 km/h (30 mph) faster than a standard Bf 109G – but not exemplary. In fact, the Bf 109G could out-turn its intended replacement. With the addition of armament, the aircraft's speed decreased to an unacceptable level. In light of its poor performance and the much more promising development of the Focke-Wulf Fw 190D, the Me 309 was canceled.

=== Me 609 ===
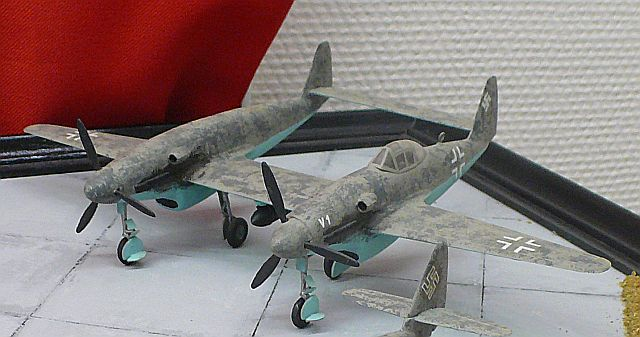
A model of the proposed Me 609

In an attempt to revive the project, initiated in response to a 1941 Reich Air Ministry requirement for a new Zerstörer (destroyer) to replace the twin engined Messerschmitt Bf 110, Messerschmitt's response was the Me 609. In order to meet the requirement of a new design in a minimum of time and with a minimum of new parts, the failed Me 309 project was used as the basis of the new fighter. The Me 609 would have joined two Me 309 fuselages with a new centre wing section. Only the two inner wheels of the joined Me 309's main landing gears would have been used and would retract into the centre section. This resulted in an unusual four-wheel arrangement. The Me 609 would have had its cockpit in the port fuselage, the starboard being smoothed over. Two versions were planned: a heavy fighter with four or six 30 mm MK 108 cannon, and a Schnellbomber (Fast bomber) variant with two 30 mm MK 108 cannon and a bombload of 1,000 kg (2,200 lb) carried beneath the fuselages. By the time designs were being ironed out, the revolutionary Messerschmitt Me 262 turbojet negated the need for further piston-engined fighter design.

=== Me 209 II ===
In 1943, Messerschmitt made one last attempt at creating a replacement for the Bf 109 in the form of a second Me 209 design, totally different from the original Me 209. It was essentially a modification of the existing 109 airframe, Messerschmitt designers not wanting to invest the time and trouble in a new design like the Me 309.

== Specifications (Me 309) ==
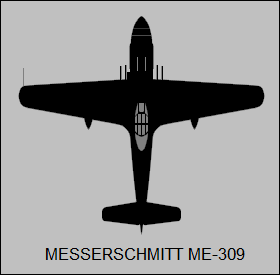
Top view of the Me 309

Data from Die Deutsche Luftrüstung 1933–1945

General characteristics

- Crew: one
- Length: 9.46 m (31 ft 0 in)
- Wingspan: 11.04 m (36 ft 3 in)
- Height: 3.9 m (12 ft 10 in)
- Wing area: 16.6 m^{2} (179 sq ft)
- Empty weight: 3,530 kg (7,782 lb)
- Gross weight: 4,250 kg (9,370 lb)
- Powerplant: 1 × Daimler-Benz DB 603G inverted V-12 liquid-cooled piston engine, 1,287 kW (1,726 hp)

Performance

- Maximum speed: 733 km/h (455 mph, 396 kn)
- Cruise speed: 665 km/h (413 mph, 359 kn)
- Range: 1,100 km (680 mi, 590 nmi)
- Service ceiling: 12,000 m (39,000 ft)
- Wing loading: 256 kg/m^{2} (52 lb/sq ft)
- Power/mass: 0.31 kW/kg (0.19 hp/lb)

Armament

- Guns:
  - 2 × 20 mm (0.79 in) MG 151 cannon
  - 4 × 13 mm (0.51 in) MG 131 machine guns
  - 1 × 30 mm (1.2 in) MK 108 cannon

== See also ==
Related development

- Me 409
- Me 509

Aircraft of comparable role, configuration, and era

- Bell P-63 Kingcobra
- Focke-Wulf Fw 190
- Hawker Tempest
- Lavochkin La-7
- Mitsubishi A7M
- Nakajima Ki-84
- North American P-51D Mustang
- Supermarine Spitfire Mk. IXc
- Yakovlev Yak-9

Related lists

- List of aircraft of World War II
- List of military aircraft of Germany
- List of World War II military aircraft of Germany

== Sources ==
- Green, William. War Planes of the Second World War, Fighters, vol. I. London: Hanover House, 1960.
- Jackson, Robert. Infamous Aircraft: Dangerous Designs and their Vices. Barnsley, Yorkshire, UK: Pen and Sword Aviation, 2005. ISBN 1-84415-172-7.
- Lepage, Jean-Denis G.G. Aircraft of the Luftwaffe, 1935-1945: An Illustrated Guide. Jefferson, North Carolina: McFarland & Company, 2009. ISBN 978-0-7864-3937-9.
- Nowarra, Heinz J. Die Deutsche Luftrüstung 1933-1945: Band 3 Flugzeugtypen Henschel–Messerschmitt. (in German). Bonn: Germany: Bernard & Graefe Verlag, 1993, pp. 215–218. ISBN 3-7637-5467-9.
- Sharp, Dan & Douglas, Callum E. (2024). Messerschmitt Me 309: Development and Politics. Horncastle, UK: Tempest Books. ISBN 978-1-911658-96-2.
