= Messerschmitt Me 209 =

German racing aircraft/demonstrator

Me 209/Bf 109R
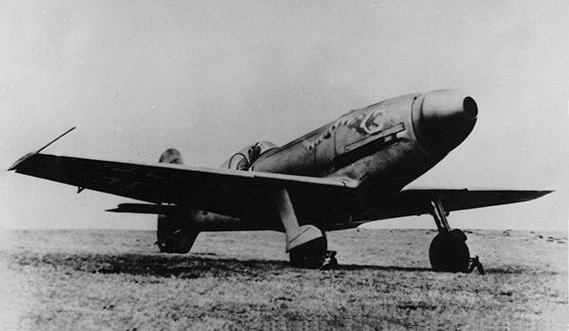
- Messerschmitt Me 209 V4

General information
- Type: Propaganda, Technology demonstration
- Manufacturer: Messerschmitt
- Designer: Willy Messerschmitt
- Number built: 4

History
- First flight: 1 August 1938

The first Messerschmitt Me 209 was a single-engine racing aircraft designed and produced by the German aircraft manufacturer Messerschmitt. It successfully established several new speed records.

The design work on what was originally designated P.1059 commenced in 1937; the Me 209 was a completely original aircraft whose sole purpose was to set new international speed records. As originally built, it has a relatively compact airframe, incorporated a steam cooling system, a unique cross-shaped tail section, and lacked any armaments. On 1 August 1938, Me 209 V1 conducted its maiden flight; a further three prototypes would be completed by May 1939. On 26 April 1939, this same aircraft established a new international speed record of almost 756 km/h (469 mph); this record was not officially broken by another piston-engined aircraft until 16 August 1969.

In addition to the Me 209 designation, the type was also assigned the Me 109R designation for propaganda purposes as part of an effort to conflate the aircraft with the Messerschmitt Bf 109, the Luftwaffe's primary fighter throughout the Second World War; it was hoped that the Me 109R designation would cause its accomplishments to be associated or confused with the Bf 109. Despite using the same Daimler-Benz DB 601 inverted V-12 engine, the Me 209 and Bf 109 had little in common with one another. Messerschmitt undertook some work to adapt the Me 209 into a combat-capable fighter, but it proved to be inferior to the existing Bf 109 in this role, and this was never produced in quantity.

The Me 209 designation was subsequently reused for a wholly separate aircraft that was the proposed successor to the Bf 109.

== Design and development ==
=== Background and design ===
Throughout much of the 1930s, various high-ranking officials within Germany advocated for the demonstration of supposed German superiority, particularly in the aviation sector, which benefitted greatly from state backing in the form of numerous development and production contracts. Some of these contracts were aimed at boosting national prestige as well as advancing Germany's aeronautical capabilities, such as the establishment of new international aviation records. It was within these active trends that the aircraft manufacturer Messerschmitt embarked on the P.1059, a clean-sheet aircraft designed solely to perform high speed flights with the specific object of setting a new absolute speed record.

During 1937, design work formally commenced, headed by the German aeronautical engineer Willy Messerschmitt. Prior to the year's end, the construction of three prototypes had commenced, by which point the aircraft had been officially designated as the Me 209.

In terms of its basic configuration, the Me 209 was a compact low-wing monoplane that was designed around a specially-produced model of the Daimler-Benz DB 601 inverted V-12 engine (early flights were performed with conventional models of the DB 601). While this engine produced up to 1,800 hp under most circumstances, it could be temporarily boosted to 2,300 hp in limited bursts for additional acceleration. While the Me 209 did share a few elements, such as the DB 601 engine, with the Messerschmitt Bf 109 fighter aircraft, it was a completely separate aircraft and had many differences. One of the more atypical feature of the Me 209 was its use of a steam cooling system, which facilitated the elimination of traditional radiator-based cooling and the resulting aerodynamic drag incurred. This system involved stored water being piped through the engine, where it absorbed heat, after which it travelled to the wings where it was cooled down before being circulated around again. Due to the constant loss of water (between 4.5 litres and 7 litres per minute), the engine could only be run for up to 30 minutes at a time.

Considerable efforts were made into minimising the equipment fitted as well as having the airframe be as small as was feasibly possible. The cockpit of the Me 209 was positioned relatively rearwards in relation to the fuselage, just forward of its unique cross-shaped tail section. Both the tailplane and elevators had a relatively small area while the fin featured a substantial ventral section. The wing's design, which aimed to minimise the wing area, resulted in relatively high wing loading of the era. While these aspects favoured the Me 209's speed capabilities, they also increased the pilot's difficulty in flying it.

Unlike the Bf 109, the Me 209 featured a wide track, inwardly-retracting undercarriage that was mounted in the wing section. There was seemingly little consideration given towards its potential use in combat.

=== Flight testing ===
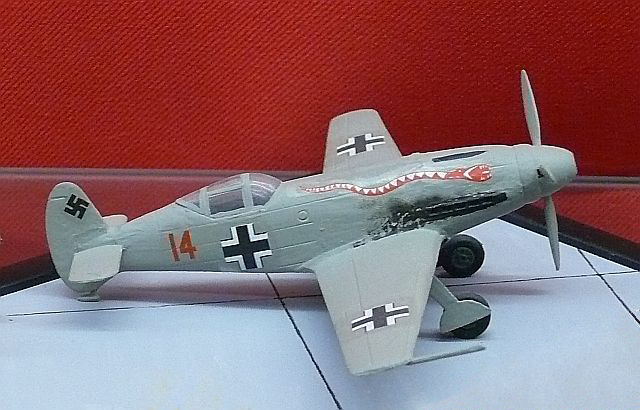
Display model of the aircraft showing its World War II configuration

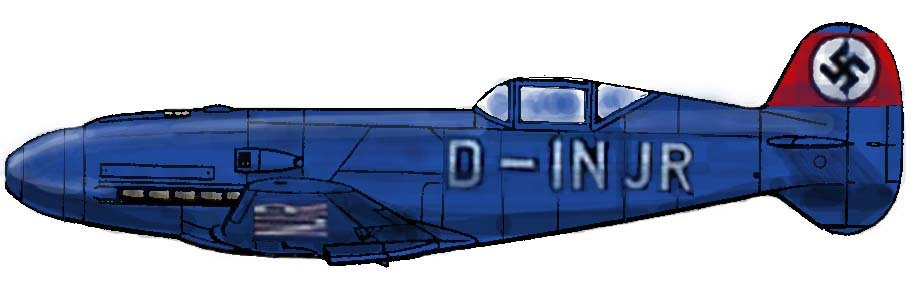
Messerschmitt Me 209 V1 showing its colors and markings

On 1 August 1938, the first prototype, Me 209 V1, performed its maiden flight, piloted by chief test pilot J. H. Wurster. Early observations included the flight controls being heavy and unwieldy, the aircraft's general instability, and an undesirable tendency for it to nose down without warning or provocation. Another negative flight characteristic was its relatively high sink rate during landing approaches, contributing to a typically heavy landing, during which the aircraft could easily and inadvertently swerve. Me 209 V2 made its first flight on 8 February 1939, but was lost in a non-fatal accident two months later that was attributed to a seized engine.

The Me 209 achieved its primary purpose when, on 26 April 1939, a new world speed record of almost 756 km/h (469 mph) was set by the first aircraft, bearing the German civil registration D-INJR and flown by test pilot Fritz Wendel. This record was not officially broken by another piston-engined aircraft until 16 August 1969 by Darryl Greenamyer's highly modified Conquest I F8F Bearcat, The absolute speed record set by the Me 209 V1 stood until October 1941, at which point it was broken by another Messerschmitt aircraft, the Me 163A V4 rocket fighter prototype, flown by Heini Dittmar, which attained a speed of 1,004 km/h (624 mph).

By the end of May 1939, both Me 209 V3 and Me 209 V4 entered flight testing. Largely due to the upcoming outbreak of the Second World War, any thought of international speed records had been set aside in favour of their use as experimental aircraft. The fourth prototype has been alleged to be involved in efforts to convert Me 209 into a fighter aircraft.

The idea of adapting the Me 209 to perform the fighter role gained momentum when, during the Battle of Britain, the Bf 109 failed to gain superiority over the Royal Air Force's fighters, such as the Supermarine Spitfire. Key changes made to the aircraft included the installation of a standard DB 601 engine, a new wing and automatic leading edge slots; efforts were made to improve the Me 209's challenging flight and landing characteristics. Armaments were envisioned to be installed in several locations, including the wing, upper nose, and within the propeller shaft.

Despite the efforts made, the Me 209 was not up to the task of aerial combat. Its wings were almost completely occupied by the engine's liquid cooling system and therefore prohibited the conventional installation of armament. The aircraft also proved to be relatively difficult to fly and extremely hard to control while on the ground. Nevertheless, Messerschmitt's design team made several attempts to improve the aircraft's performance, such as through the adoption of longer wings, a taller vertical stabilizer, and installing a pair of synchronized 7.92 mm (.312 in) MG 17 machine guns in the engine cowling. Its various modifications, however, added so much weight that the Me 209 ended up slower than the contemporary Bf 109E. In light of this disappointing performance, the conversion project was promptly abandoned in favour of other efforts.

=== Propaganda use ===
The Me 209's designation was used by Messerschmitt as a propaganda tool. Although the aircraft was a "single purpose" high-speed experimental prototype, it was hoped that its designation would associate it and its world-beating performance with the Bf 109 already in combat service.

During 1939, the speed record achievement of the Me 209 was used for a propaganda disinformation campaign, wherein the aircraft (possibly from its post-July 1938 first flight date) was given the designation Me 109R, with the later prefix, never used for wartime Bf 109 fighters. This disinformation was naturally designed to give an aura of invincibility to the Bf 109, which was not dispelled until the conclusion of the Battle of Britain.

== Surviving aircraft ==
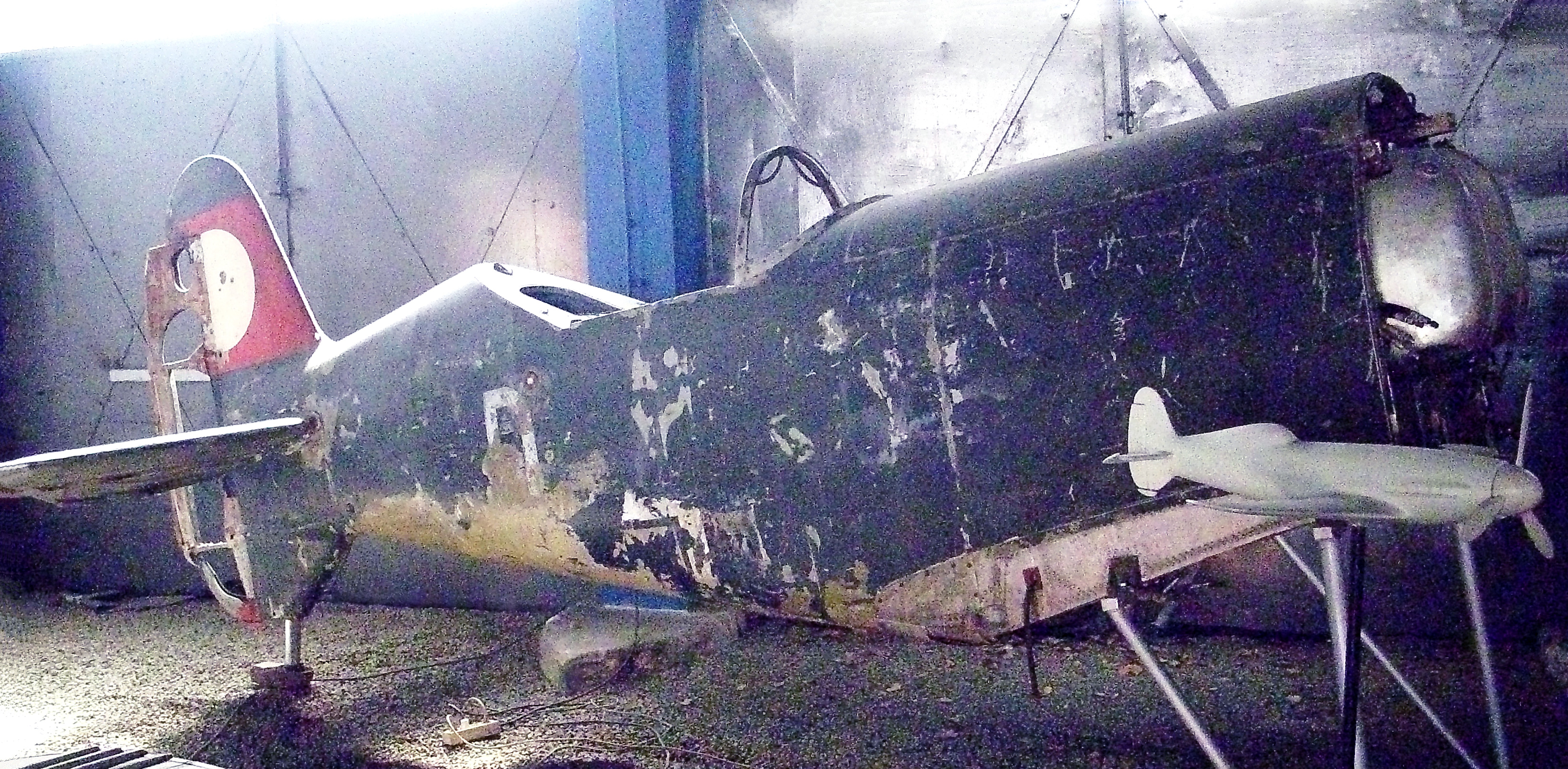
Me 209 fuselage at the Polish Aviation Museum, Kraków.

The fuselage of the Me 209 V1 is currently on display, at the Polish Aviation Museum in Kraków, Poland and was once a part of Hermann Göring's personal collection.

== Specifications (Me 209 V1) ==
Data from Die Deutsche Luftrüstung 1933–1945

General characteristics

- Crew: one
- Length: 7.24 m (23 ft 9 in)
- Wingspan: 7.8 m (25 ft 7 in)
- Height: 3.2 m (10 ft 6 in)
- Powerplant: 1 × Daimler-Benz DB 601ARJ inverted V-12 liquid-cooled piston engine, 1,324 kW (1,775 hp)

Performance

- Maximum speed: 755 km/h (469 mph, 408 kn)

== See also ==
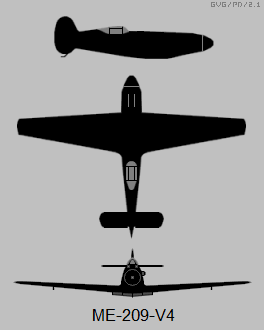
Three-view of the Me 209 V4

Related development

- Bf 109
- Me 209 (second design)
- Me 309
- Me 409
- Me 509
- Me 609

Related lists

- List of military aircraft of Germany
- List of World War II military aircraft of Germany
