= Messerschmitt Me 209 (second design) =

German fighter prototype

Me 209
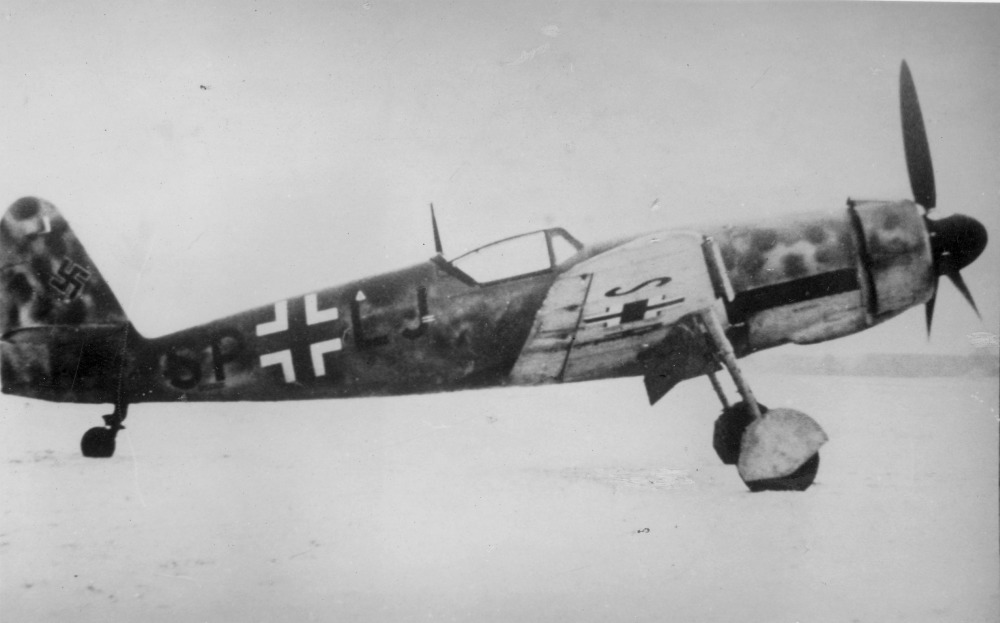
- Me 209 with DB 603 engine

General information
- Type: Fighter prototype
- Manufacturer: Messerschmitt
- Designer: Willy Messerschmitt
- Primary user: Luftwaffe (intended)
- Number built: 4

History
- First flight: 13 November 1943
- Retired: 1944

The second Me 209 design was a late World War II attempt by Willy Messerschmitt to create an enhanced version of Luftwaffe's primary fighter aircraft, the Bf 109. The Me 209, despite its designation, bore no relationship to the earlier Me 209.

The RLM's 8-209 airframe number assigned to Messerschmitt, for its pair of post-July 1938 designation Me 209 airframes, was used for two projects during the late 1930s and early 1940s. The first Me 209 was a single-engine air speed record plane for which little consideration was given to adaptation for combat.

== Design and development ==
The second use of the Me 209 designation was for a proposal, in 1943, to make a heavily modified version of the Bf 109. This Me 209 would compete against Focke-Wulf's high-performance Fw 190 D-9 and Ta 152 fighters. Like these enhanced versions of Kurt Tank's design, the new Me 209 would share most of its airframe with a proven model, in this case the Bf 109G.

Unfortunately for the design team, the Me 209's proposed DB 603A engine was in short supply and they were forced to use the Junkers Motorenwerke firm's Jumo 213A engine. Even though the 35-litre engine displacement Jumo 213 had been deliberately designed to have as many of its engine access points as possible made to be identical with the 44.52-litre displacement DB 603 powerplant (Germany's largest-displacement inverted V12 aircraft engine), this changeover required some reconstruction of the engine cowling and cooling system. The most visible change was the required one to the engine's air intake location, as the Jumo 213's supercharger intake was located on the starboard side of the engine (as standard for all models of the earlier Junkers Jumo 211 inverted V12), versus the DB 603's portside location, the standard for all Daimler-Benz inverted V12 engine designs. The Me 209 featured a new tail section, wings, wide-track landing gear, a taller tail and an annular radiator for the inline engine, which gave the engine a superficial resemblance to a radial engine and to the very similar installation on the Focke-Wulf Fw 190D, which used the same Jumo 213 powerplant. The extent of the modifications undermined the original purpose, which was to build a superior aircraft as similar to the existing Bf 109G as possible.

The Me 209 V5 featured armament of one Motorkanone engine-mounted 30 mm (1.18 in) MK 108 cannon plus two 13 mm (.51 in) MG 131 machine guns in the wing roots. The V6 was the first version to be converted to use the Jumo 213 engine and had 20 mm MG 151/20 cannon instead of the MG 131s. The Me 209H V1 was a high-altitude variant with extended wings and DB 603 engine.

== Testing ==
The program met a swift end when the Me 209 V5 prototype first flew in late 1943. It was 50 km/h (31 mph) slower than the Fw 190D and offered no improvement in handling characteristics. After its disappointing show, the Me 209 project was cancelled.

== Specifications (Me 209 V5) ==
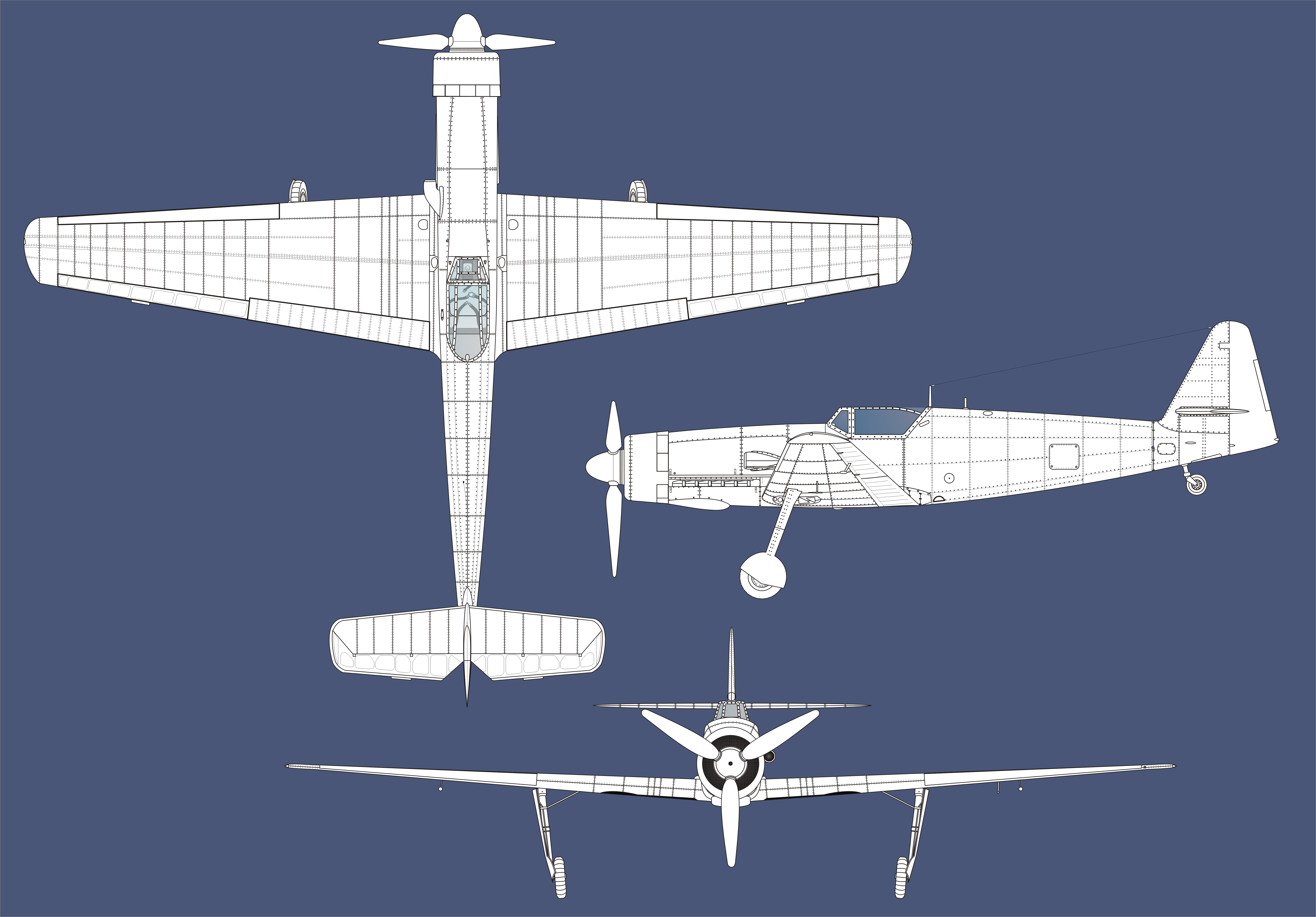
Three-view

Data from

General characteristics

- Crew: 1
- Length: 9.74 m (31 ft 11 in)
- Wingspan: 10.95 m (35 ft 11 in)
- Height: 4 m (13 ft 1 in)
- Wing area: 17.2 m^{2} (185 sq ft)
- Empty weight: 3,339 kg (7,361 lb)
- Gross weight: 4,085 kg (9,006 lb)
- Powerplant: 1 × Daimler-Benz DB 603G V-12 inverted liquid-cooled piston engine 1,900 PS (1,900 hp; 1,400 kW)
- Propellers: 3-bladed constant-speed propeller

Performance

- Maximum speed: 678 km/h (421 mph, 366 kn)
- Service ceiling: 11,000 m (36,000 ft)
- Wing loading: 238 kg/m^{2} (49 lb/sq ft)
- Power/mass: 0.36 kW/kg (0.22 hp/lb)

Armament

- 1 × 30 mm (1.18 in) MK 108 cannon
- 2 × 13 mm (.51 in) MG 131 machine guns

== See also ==
Related development

- Messerschmitt Bf 109
- Messerschmitt Me 209
- Messerschmitt Me 309
- Messerschmitt Me 409
- Messerschmitt Me 509
- Messerschmitt Me 609

Related lists

- List of military aircraft of Germany
