= V-1 flying bomb =

German World War II cruise missile

V-1 flying bomb Fieseler Fi 103 Flakzielgerät 76 (FZG-76)
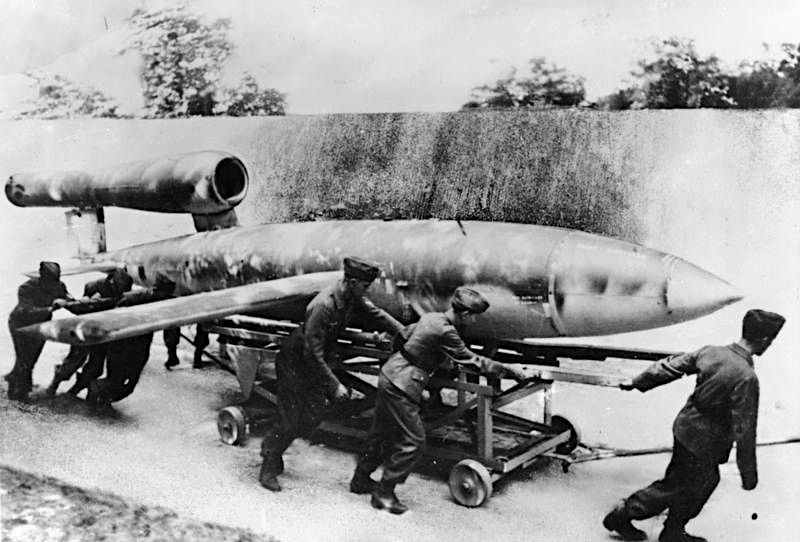
- Type: Cruise missile
- Place of origin: Nazi Germany

Service history
- In service: 1944–1945
- Used by: Luftwaffe
- Wars: World War II

Production history
- Designer: Robert Lusser
- Manufacturer: Fieseler
- Unit cost: 5,090 RM
- Variants: Fieseler Fi 103R Reichenberg

Specifications
- Mass: 2,150 kg (4,740 lb)
- Length: 8.32 m (27.3 ft)
- Width: 5.37 m (17.6 ft)
- Height: 1.42 m (4 ft 8 in)
- Warhead: Amatol-39, later Trialen
- Warhead weight: 850 kg (1,870 lb)
- Detonation mechanism: Electrical impact fuze; Backup mechanical impact fuze; Time fuze to prevent examination of duds
- Engine: Argus As 109-014 Pulsejet
- Operational range: 250 km (160 mi)
- Maximum speed: 640 km/h (400 mph) flying between 600 and 900 m (2,000 and 3,000 ft)
- Guidance system: Gyrocompass based autopilot

The V-1 flying bomb (German: Vergeltungswaffe 1, lit. 'Vengeance Weapon 1' (Note: Vergeltungswaffe "vengeance weapon 1" (Vergeltung can also be translated as "retribution", "reprisal," or "retaliation"), also Fieseler Fi 103 by the RLM's airframe number 8-103.)) was an early cruise missile. Its official Reich Aviation Ministry (RLM) name was Fieseler Fi 103 and its suggestive name was Höllenhund (hellhound). It was also known to the Allies as the buzz bomb or doodlebug and Maikäfer (maybug). (Note: From the low hum resembling that of the insect. It was also referred to as a "robot bomb".)

The V-1 was the first of the Vergeltungswaffen (V-weapons) deployed for the terror bombing of London. It was developed at Peenemünde Army Research Center in 1942 by the Luftwaffe, and during initial development was known by the codename Kirschkern (cherry stone). Due to its limited range, the thousands of V-1 missiles launched into England were fired from launch sites along the French (Pas-de-Calais) and Dutch coasts or by modified Heinkel He 111 aircraft.

The Wehrmacht first launched the V-1s against London on 13 June 1944, one week after (and prompted by) Operation Overlord, the Allied landings in France. At times more than one hundred V-1s a day were fired at south-east England, 9,521 in total, decreasing in number as sites were overrun until October 1944, when the last V-1 site in range of Britain was overrun by Allied forces. After this, the Germans directed V-1s at the port of Antwerp and at other targets in Belgium, launching another 2,448 V-1s. The attacks stopped only a month before the war in Europe ended, when the last launch site in the Low Countries was overrun on 29 March 1945.

As part of Operation Crossbow, operations against the V-1, the British air defences consisted of anti-aircraft guns, barrage balloons and fighter aircraft, to intercept the bombs before they reached their targets, while the launch sites and underground storage depots became targets for Allied attacks including strategic bombing.

In 1944 a number of tests of this weapon were apparently conducted in Tornio, Finland. On one occasion, several Finnish soldiers saw a German plane launch what they described as a bomb shaped like a small, winged aircraft. The flight and impact of another prototype was seen by Finnish frontline soldiers; they noted that its engine stopped suddenly, causing the V-1 to descend sharply, and explode on impact, leaving a crater 20–30 metres (66–98 ft) wide. These V-1s became known to Finnish soldiers as "flying torpedoes".

== Design and development ==
In 1935 Paul Schmidt and Georg Hans Madelung submitted a design to the Luftwaffe for a flying bomb. It was an innovative design that used a pulse-jet engine, while previous work dating back to 1915 by Sperry Gyroscope relied on propellers. While employed by the Argus Motoren company, Fritz Gosslau developed a remote-controlled target drone, the FZG 43 (Flakzielgerät-43). In October 1939 Argus proposed Fernfeuer, a remote-controlled aircraft carrying a payload of one ton, that could return to base after releasing its bomb. Argus worked in co-operation with C. Lorenz AG and Arado Flugzeugwerke to develop the project. However, the Luftwaffe declined to award them a development contract. In 1940, Schmidt and Argus began cooperating, integrating Schmidt's shutter system with Argus' atomized fuel injection. Tests began in January 1941, and the first flight made on 30 April 1941 with a Gotha Go 145. On 27 February 1942 Gosslau and Robert Lusser sketched out the design of an aircraft with the pulse-jet above the tail, the basis for the future V-1.

Lusser produced a preliminary design in April 1942, P35 Erfurt, which used gyroscopes. When submitted to the Luftwaffe on 5 June 1942, the specifications included a range of 300 km (186 miles), a speed of 700 km/h (435 mph), and capable of delivering a 500-kilogram (1/2-long-ton) warhead. Project Fieseler Fi 103 was approved on 19 June, and assigned code name Kirschkern and cover name Flakzielgerät 76 (FZG-76). Flight tests were conducted at the Luftwaffe's Erprobungsstelle coastal test centre at Karlshagen, Peenemünde-West.

Erhard Milch, State Secretary in the Reich Ministry of Aviation and Inspector General of the Air force, awarded Argus the contract for the engine, Fieseler the airframe, and Askania the guidance system. By 30 August Fieseler had completed the first fuselage, and the first flight of the Fi 103 V7 took place on 10 December 1942, when it was airdropped by a Fw 200. Then on Christmas Eve, the V-1 flew 900 m (1,000 yd), for about a minute, after a ground launch. On 26 May 1943 Germany decided to put both the V-1 and the V-2 into production. In July 1943 the V-1 flew 245 kilometres (152 mi) and impacted within a kilometre (1,100 yards) of its target.

The V-1 was named by Das Reich journalist Hans Schwarz Van Berkl in June 1944 with Hitler's approval.

== Description ==
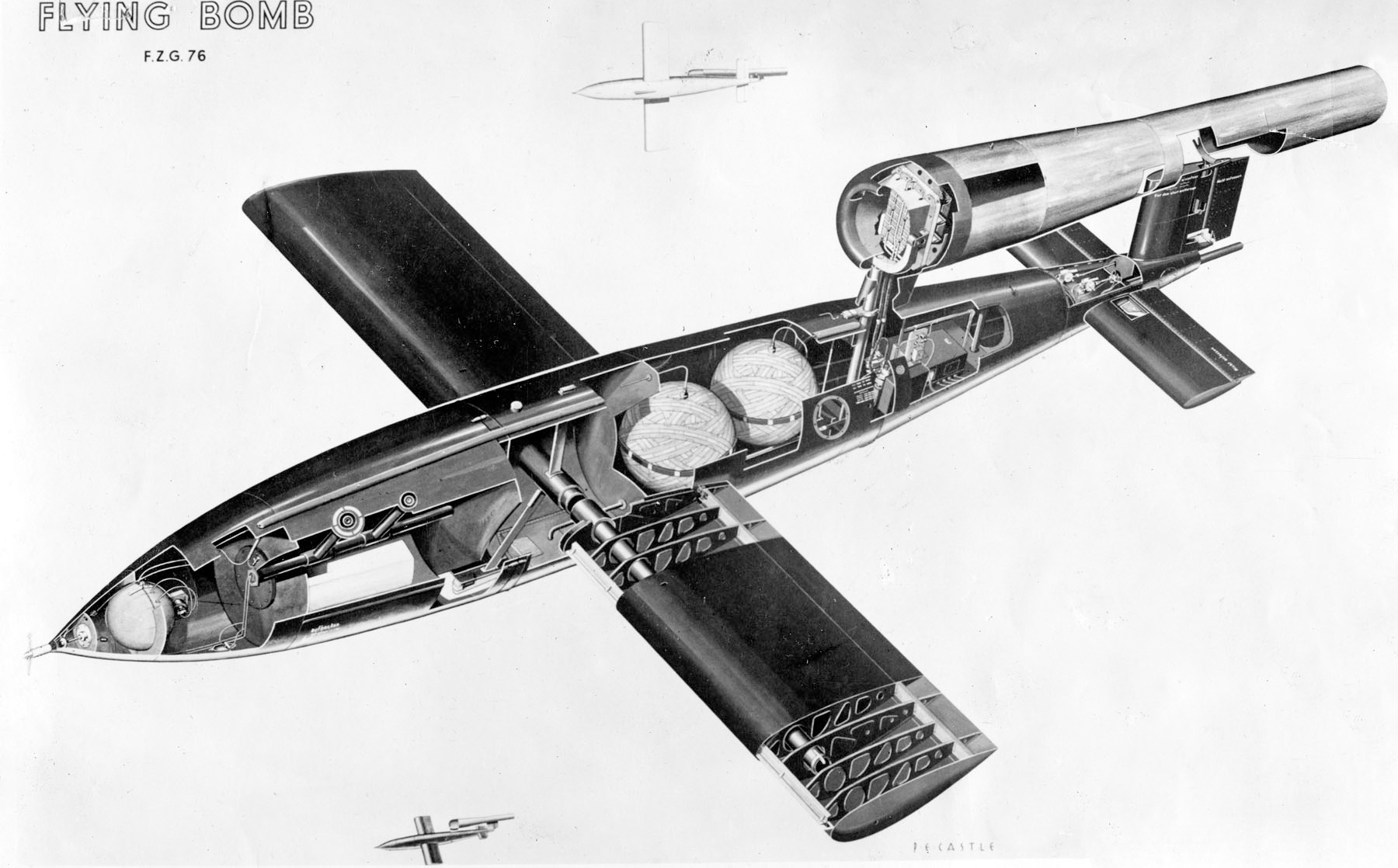
V-1 cutaway

The V-1 was designed under the codename Kirschkern (cherry stone) by Lusser and Gosslau, with a fuselage constructed mainly of welded sheet steel and wings built of plywood. The simple, Argus-built pulsejet engine pulsed 50 times per second, and the characteristic buzzing sound gave rise to the colloquial names "buzz bomb" or "doodlebug" (a common name for a wide variety of flying insects). It was known briefly in Germany (on Hitler's orders) as Maikäfer (May bug literally "May" + "chafer") and Krähe (crow).

=== Power plant ===
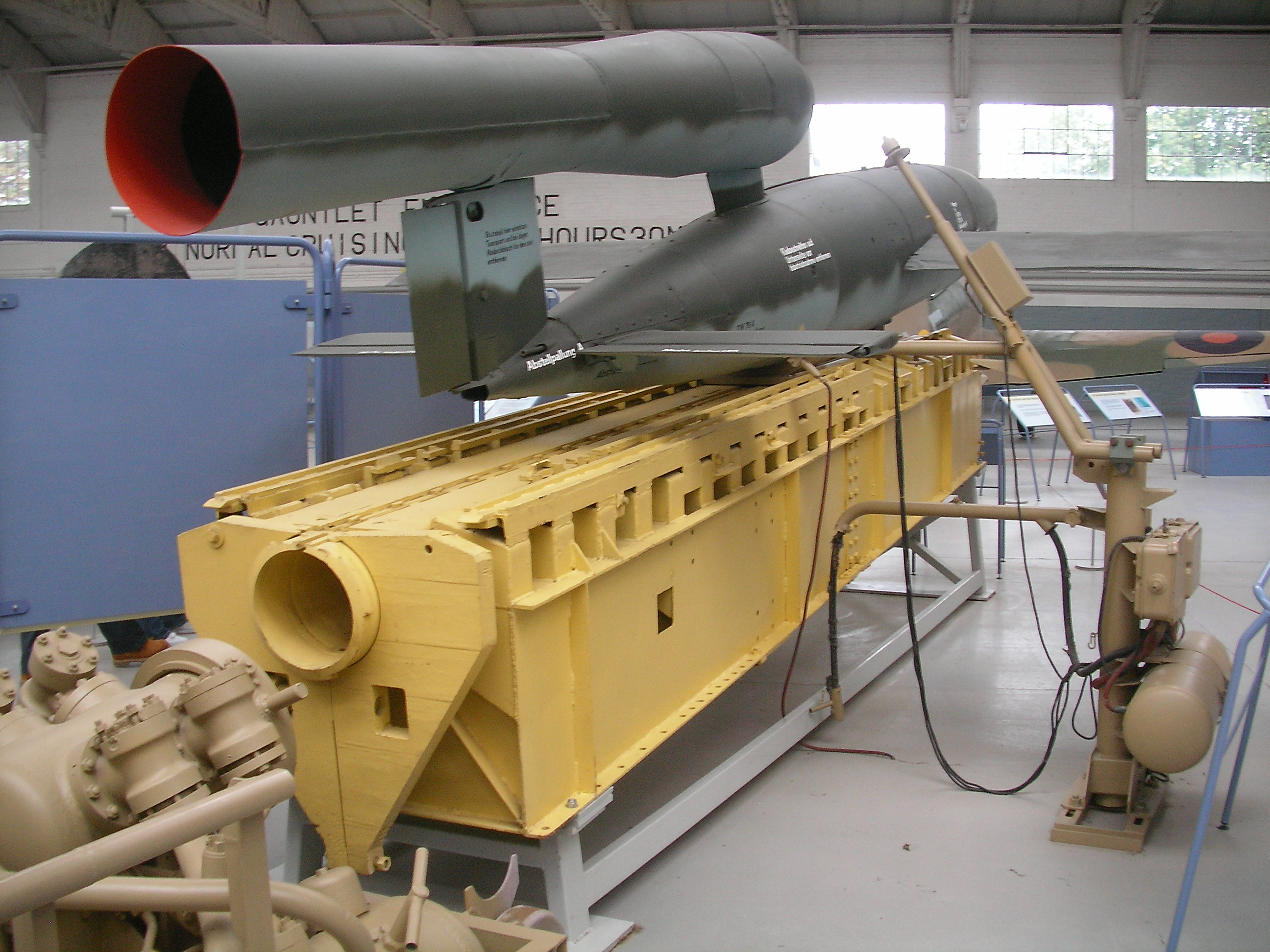
Rear view of V-1 in IWM Duxford, showing launch ramp section

The Argus pulsejet's major components included the nacelle, fuel jets, flap valve grid, mixing chamber venturi, tail pipe, and spark plug. Compressed air rather than a fuel pump forced gasoline from the 640 L (140 imp gal; 170 US gal) fuel tank through the fuel jets which consisted of three banks of three atomizers. These nine atomizing nozzles were in front of the air inlet valve system where it mixed with air before entering the chamber. A throttle valve, connected to altitude and ram pressure instruments, controlled fuel flow. Schmidt's spring-controlled flap valve system provided an efficient straight path for incoming air. The flaps momentarily closed after each explosion, the resultant gas compressed in the venturi chamber, and its tapered portion accelerated the exhaust gases creating thrust. The operation proceeded at a rate of 42 cycles per second.

Beginning in January 1941, the V-1's pulsejet engine was also tested on a variety of craft, including automobiles and an experimental attack boat known as the Tornado, in which a boat loaded with a 700 kg (1,500 lb) warhead was steered towards a target ship either by remote control or by a pilot who would leap out of the back at the last moment. The Tornado was assembled from surplus seaplane hulls connected in catamaran fashion. Ultimately insufficient Argus 014 pulse-jets were available as all production was allocated to the V-1 missile program. The engine made its first flight aboard a Gotha Go 145 on 30 April 1941.

=== Guidance system ===
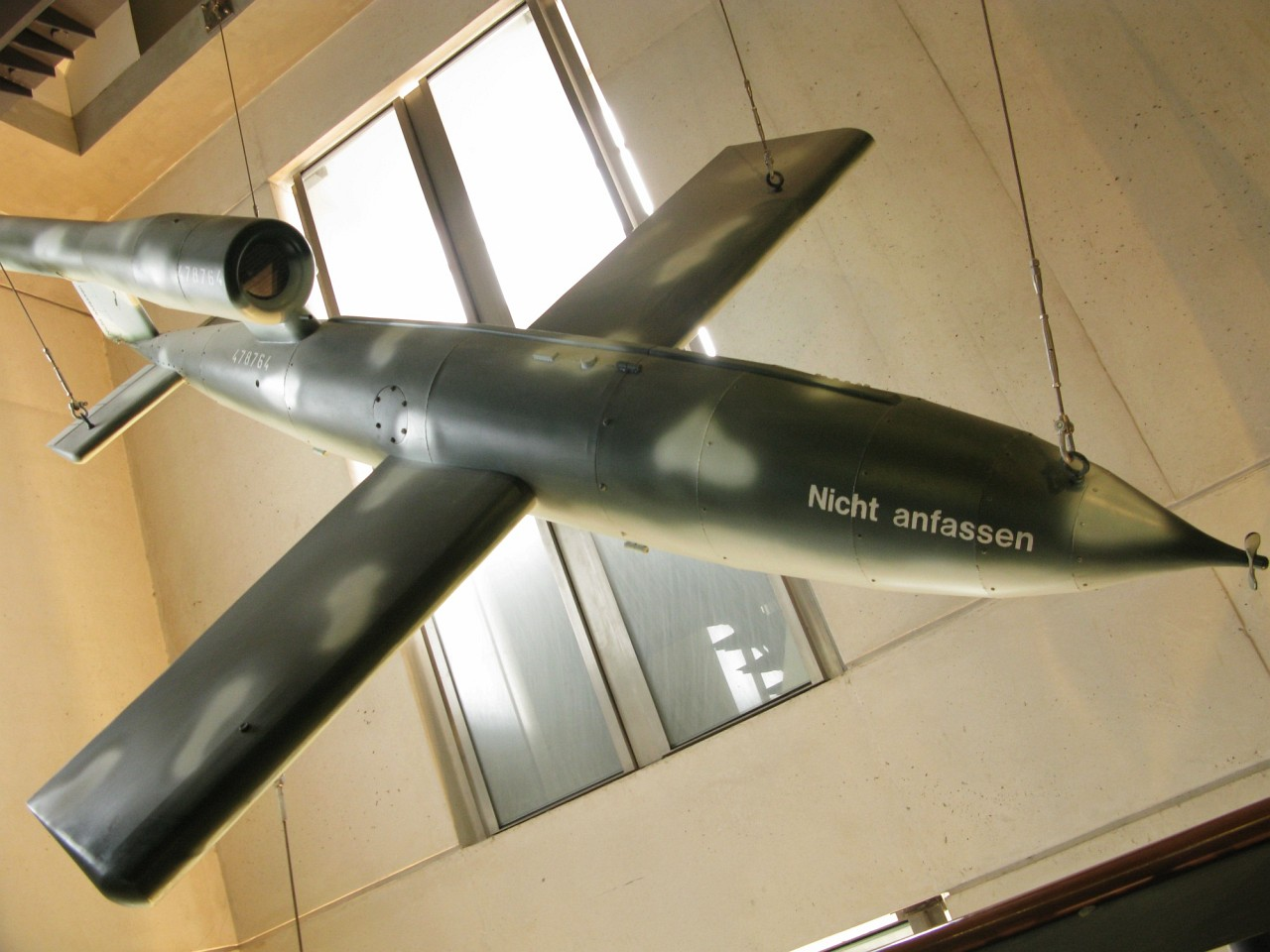
A V-1 on display in the Musée de l'Armée, Paris

The V-1 guidance system used a simple autopilot developed by Askania in Berlin to regulate altitude and airspeed. A pair of gyroscopes controlled yaw and pitch, while azimuth was maintained by a magnetic compass. Altitude was maintained by a barometric device. Two spherical tanks contained compressed air at 6.2 megapascals (900 psi), that drove the gyros, operated the pneumatic servomotors controlling the rudder and elevator, and pressurized the fuel system.

The magnetic compass was located near the front of the V-1, within a wooden sphere. Shortly before launch, the V-1 was suspended inside the Compass Swinging Building (Richthaus). There the compass was corrected for magnetic variance and magnetic deviation. The RLM at first planned to use a radio control system with the V-1 for precision attacks, but the government decided instead to use the missile against London. Some flying bombs were equipped with a basic radio transmitter operating in the range of 340–450 kHz. Once over the channel, the radio would be switched on by the vane counter, and a 120-metre (400 ft) aerial deployed. A coded Morse signal, unique to each V-1 site, transmitted the route, and impact zone calculated once the radio stopped transmitting.

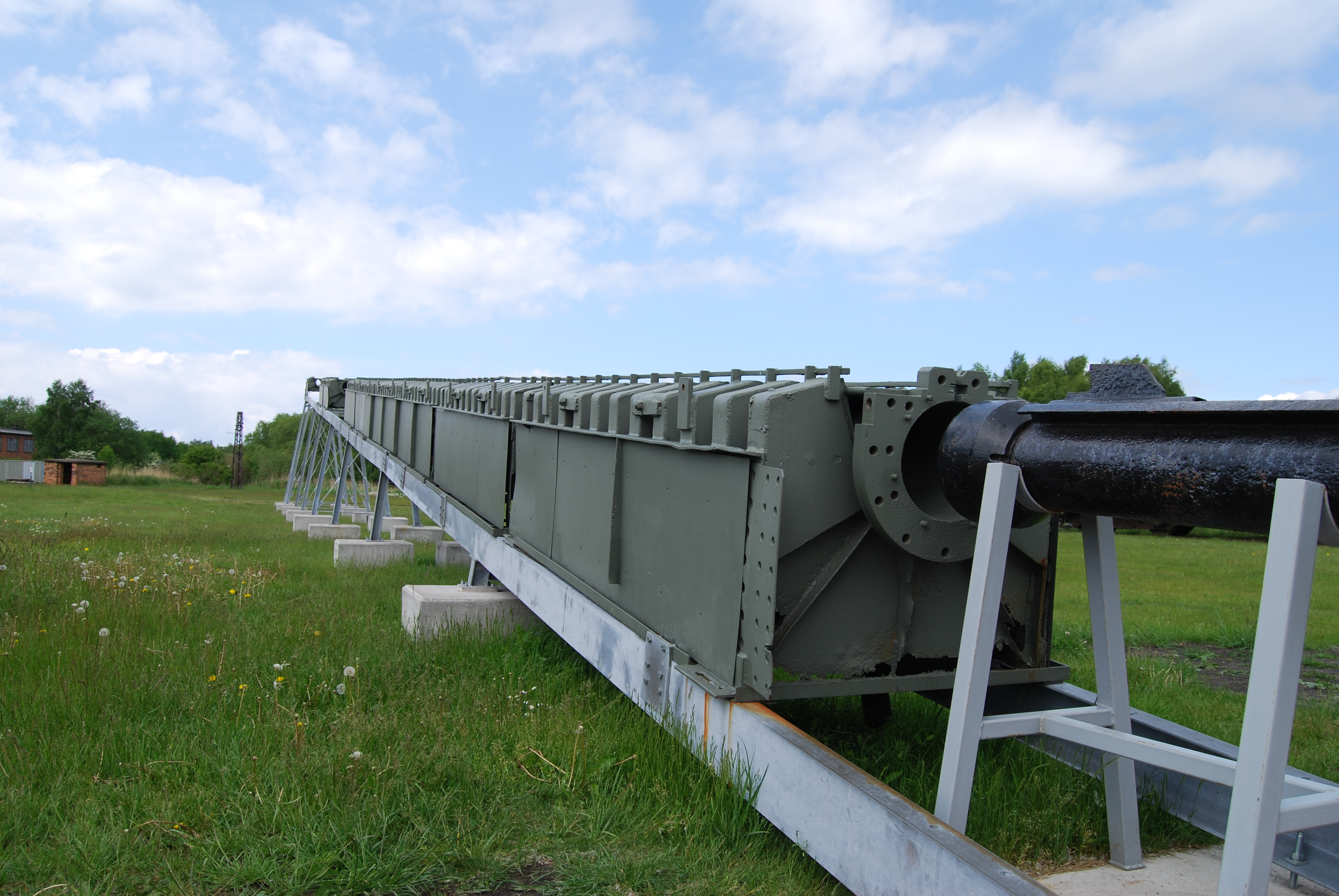
A reconstructed starting ramp for V-1 flying bombs, Historical Technical Museum, Peenemünde (2009)

An odometer driven by a vane anemometer on the nose determined when the target area had been reached, accurate enough for area bombing. Before launch, it was set to count backwards from a value that would reach zero upon arrival at the target in the prevailing wind conditions. As the missile flew, the airflow turned the propeller, and every 30 rotations of the propeller counted down one number on the odometer. This odometer triggered the arming of the warhead after about 60 km (37 mi). When the count reached zero, two detonating bolts were fired. Two spoilers on the elevator were released, the linkage between the elevator and servo was jammed, and a guillotine device cut off the control hoses to the rudder servo, setting the rudder in neutral. These actions put the V-1 into a steep dive. While this was originally intended to be a power dive, in practice the dive caused the fuel flow to cease, which stopped the engine. The sudden silence after the buzzing alerted people under the flight path to the impending impact.

Initially, V-1s landed within a circle 31 km (19 mi) in diameter, but by the end of the war, accuracy had been improved to about 11 km (7 mi), which was comparable to the V-2 rocket.

=== Warhead ===
The warhead consisted of 850 kg (1,870 lb) of Amatol, 52A+ high-grade, blast-effective explosive with three fuses. An electrical fuse could be triggered by nose or belly impact. Another fuse was a slow-acting mechanical fuse allowing deeper penetration into the ground, regardless of the altitude. The third fuse was a delayed action fuse, set to go off two hours after launch.

The purpose of the third fuse was to avoid the risk of this secret weapon being examined by the British. Its time delay was too short to be a useful booby trap but was instead meant to destroy the weapon if a soft landing had not triggered the impact fuses. These fusing systems were very reliable, and almost no dud V-1s were recovered.

=== Walter catapult ===
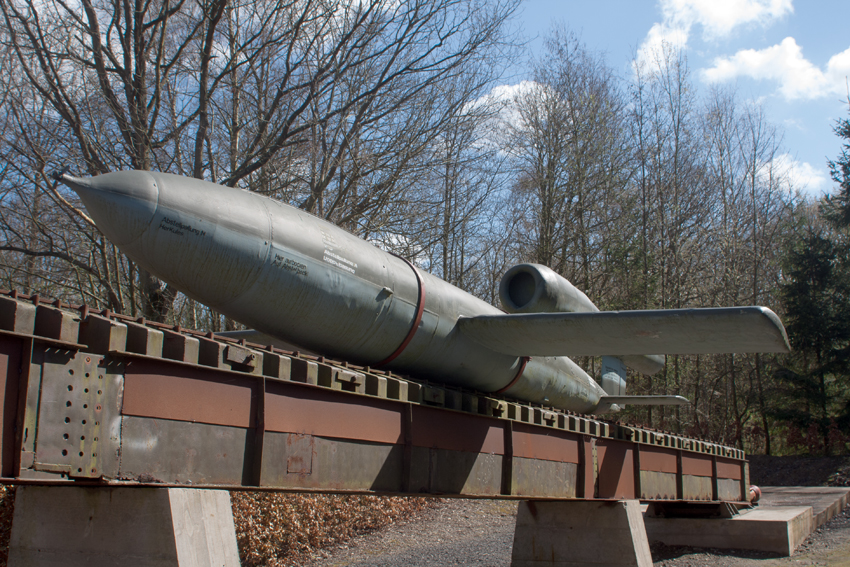
V-1 on Walter catapult ramp at Éperlecques

Ground-launched V-1s were propelled up an inclined launch ramp by an apparatus known as Dampferzeuger ("steam generator"), in which steam was generated when hydrogen peroxide (T-Stoff) was mixed with sodium permanganate (Z-Stoff). Designed by Hellmuth Walter KG, the "WR 2.3" Schlitzrohrschleuder consisted of a small gas generator trailer, where the T-Stoff and Z-Stoff combined, generating high-pressure steam that was fed into a tube within the launch rail box. A piston in the tube, connected underneath the missile, was propelled forward by the steam. It is a common misconception that the steam launch was to allow the engine to start running but the real reason was that the Argus had insufficient power to propel the V1 to a speed above its extremely high stall speed. The launch rail was 49 m (160 ft) long, consisting of eight modular sections, each 6 m (20 ft) long, and a muzzle brake. Production of the Walter catapult began in January 1944.

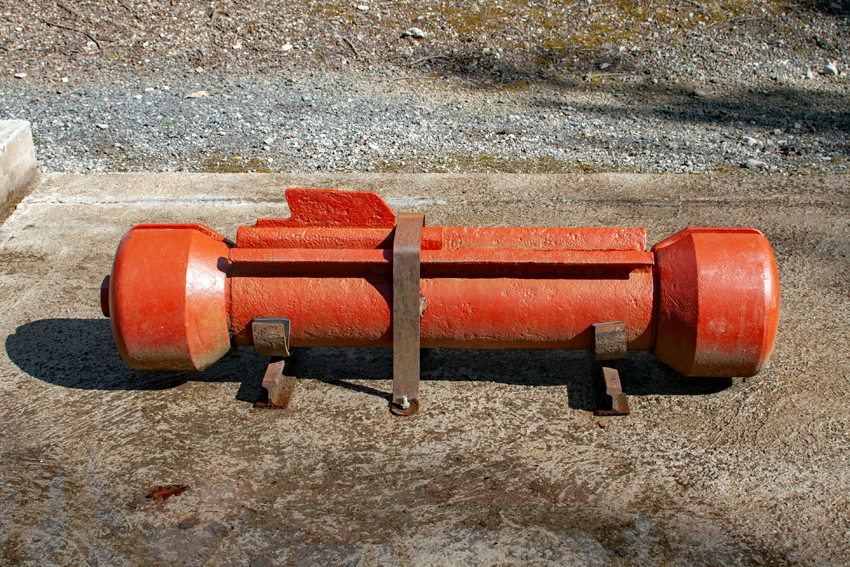
V-1 launch piston for Walter catapult

The Walter catapult accelerated the V-1 to a launch speed of 320 km/h (200 mph), well above the needed minimum operational speed of 240 km/h (150 mph). The V-1 reached the British coast at 550 km/h (340 mph), but continued to accelerate to 640 km/h (400 mph) by the time it reached London, as its 570 L (150 US gal) of fuel burned off.

On 18 June 1943 Hermann Göring decided on launching the V-1, using the Walter catapult, in large launch bunkers, called Wasserwerk (the German word for "water works"), and lighter installations, called the Stellungsystem. The Wasserwerk bunker measured 215 m (705 ft) long, 36 m (118 ft) wide, and 10 m (33 ft) high. Four were initially to be built: Wasserwerk Desvres, Wasserwerk St. Pol, Wasserwerk Valognes, and Wasserwerk Cherbourg. Stellungsystem-I was to be operated by Flak Regiment 155(W), with 4 launch battalions, each having 4 launchers, and located in the Pas-de-Calais region. Stellungsystem-II, with 32 sites, was to act as a reserve unit. Stellungsystem-I and II had nine batteries manned by February 1944. Stellungsystem-III, operated by FR 255(W), was to be organized in the spring of 1944, and located between Rouen and Caen. The Stellungsystem locations included distinctive catapult walls pointed towards London, several J-shaped stowage buildings referred to as "ski" buildings as on aerial reconnaissance photographs the buildings looked like a ski on its side, and a compass correction building which was constructed without ferrous metal. In the spring of 1944, Oberst Schmalschläger had developed a more simplified launching site, called Einsatzstellungen (meaning ca. "deployed emplacement"). Less conspicuous, 80 launch sites and 16 support sites were located from Calais to Normandy. Each site took only two weeks to construct, using 40 men, and the Walter catapult only took 7–8 days to erect, when the time was ready to make it operational.

Once near the launch ramp, the wing spar and wings were attached and the missile was slid off the loading trolley, Zubringerwagen, onto the launch ramp. The ramp catapult was powered by the Dampferzeuger trolley. The pulse-jet engine was started by the Anlassgerät, which provided compressed air for the engine intake, and initial electrical supply for the engine spark plug, and autopilot. The Bosch spark plug was only needed to start the engine, while residual flame ignited further mixtures of gasoline and air, and the engine would be at full power after 7 seconds. The catapult would then accelerate the bomb above its stall speed of 320 km/h (200 mph), ensuring sufficient ram air.

== Operation Eisbär ==
V-1 (Fieseler Fi 103) in flight

Mass production of the FZG-76 did not start until the spring of 1944, and FR 155(W) was not equipped until late May 1944. Operation Eisbär, the missile attacks on London, commenced on 12 June. However, the four launch battalions could only operate from the Pas-de-Calais area, amounting to only 72 launchers. They had been supplied with missiles, Walter catapults, fuel, and other associated equipment since D-Day. None of the nine missiles launched on the 12th reached England, while only four did so on the 13th. The next attempt to start the attack occurred on the night of 15/16 June, when 144 missiles reached England, of which 73 struck London, while 53 struck Portsmouth and Southampton.

Damage was widespread and Eisenhower ordered attacks on the V-1 sites as a priority. Operation Cobra forced a retreat from the French launch sites in August, with the last battalion leaving on 29 August. Operation Donnerschlag began from Germany on 21 October 1944.

== Operation and effectiveness ==
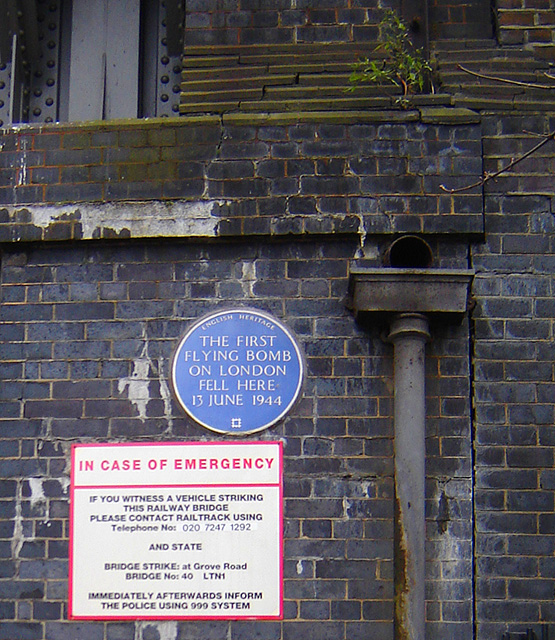
On 13 June 1944, the first V-1 struck London next to the railway bridge on Grove Road, Mile End, which now carries this English Heritage blue plaque. Eight civilians were killed in the blast.

The first complete V-1 airframe was delivered on 30 August 1942, and after the first complete As.109-014 was delivered in September, the first glide test flight was on 28 October 1942 at Peenemünde, from under a Focke-Wulf Fw 200. The first powered trial was on 10 December, launched from beneath an He 111.

The LXV Armeekorps z.b.V. ("65th Army Corps for special deployment) formed during the last days of November 1943 in France commanded by General der Artillerie z.V. Erich Heinemann was responsible for the operational use of V-1.

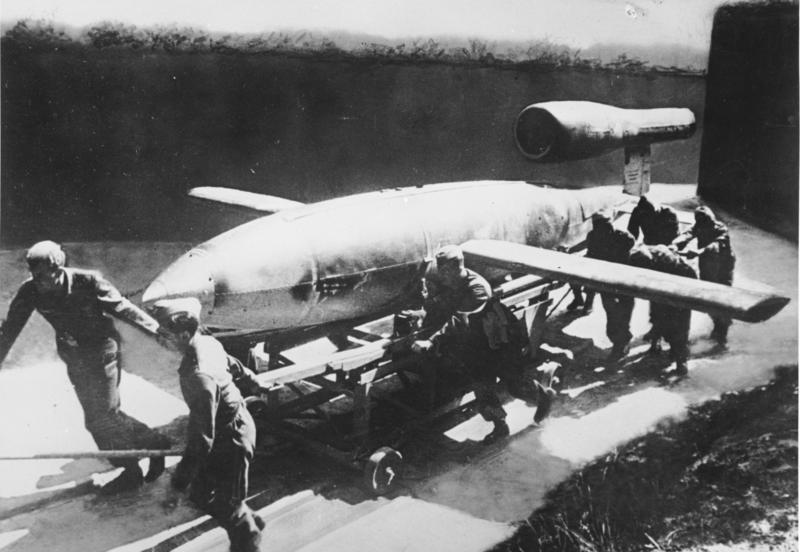
A German crew rolls out a V-1.

The conventional launch sites could theoretically launch about 15 V-1s per day, but this rate was difficult to achieve on a consistent basis; the maximum rate achieved was 18. Overall, only about 25% of the V-1s hit their targets, the majority being lost due to a combination of defensive measures, mechanical unreliability, or guidance errors. At least six V-1s are known to have landed erroneously in Sweden. With the capture or destruction of the launch facilities used to attack England, the V-1s were employed in attacks against strategic points in Belgium, primarily the port of Antwerp.

Launches against Britain were met by a variety of countermeasures, including barrage balloons and aircraft such as the Hawker Tempest and newly introduced jet Gloster Meteor. These measures were so successful that by August 1944 about 80% of V-1s were being destroyed The Meteors suffered from frequent cannon failures, and accounted for only 13 V-1s destroyed. In all, about 1,000 V-1s were destroyed by aircraft.

The intended operational altitude was originally set at 2,750 m (9,000 ft), but repeated failures of a barometric fuel-pressure regulator led to the operational height being halved in May 1944, bringing V-1s into range of the 40 mm Bofors light anti-aircraft guns commonly used by Allied AA units.

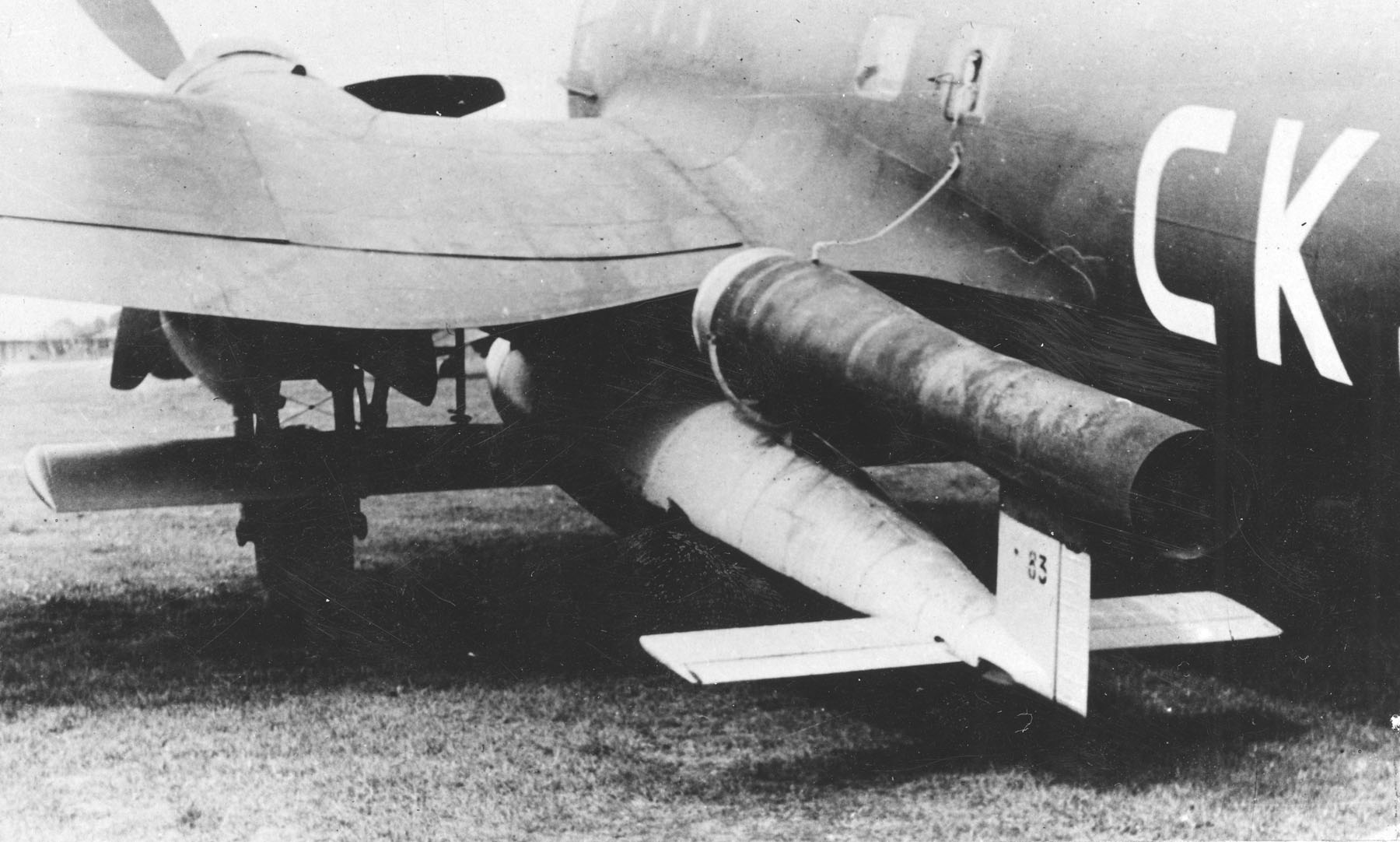
A German Luftwaffe Heinkel He 111 H-22. This version could carry FZG 76 (V1) flying bombs, but only a few aircraft were produced in 1944. Some were used by bomb wing KG 3.

The trial versions of the V-1 were air-launched. Most operational V-1s were launched from static sites on land, but from July 1944 to January 1945, the Luftwaffe launched approximately 1,176 from modified Heinkel He 111 H-22s of the Luftwaffe's Kampfgeschwader 3 (3rd Bomber Wing, the so-called "Blitz Wing") flying over the North Sea. Apart from the obvious motive of permitting the bombardment campaign to continue after static ground sites on the French coast were lost, air launching gave the Luftwaffe the opportunity to outflank the increasingly effective ground and air defences put up by the British against the missile. To minimise the associated risks (primarily radar detection), the aircrews developed a tactic called "lo-hi-lo": the He 111s would, upon leaving their airbases and crossing the coast, descend to an exceptionally low altitude. When the launch point was neared, the bombers would swiftly ascend, fire their V-1s, and then rapidly descend again to the previous "wave-top" level for the return flight. Research after the war estimated a 40% failure rate of air-launched V-1s, and the He 111s used in this role were vulnerable to night-fighter attack, as the launch lit up the area around the aircraft for several seconds. The combat potential of air-launched V-1s dwindled during 1944 at about the same rate as that of the ground-launched missiles, as the British gradually took the measure of the weapon and developed increasingly effective defence tactics.

== Experimental, piloted, and long-range variants ==
=== Piloted variant ===
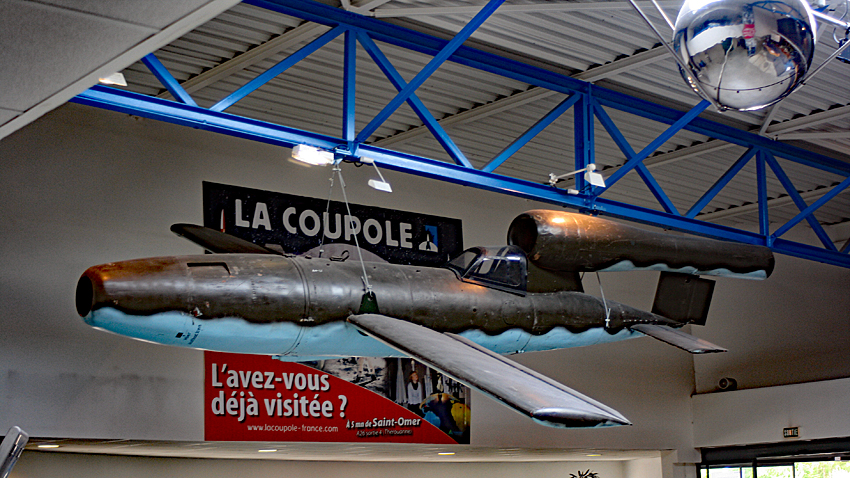
Fieseler F103R Reichenberg piloted V-1

Late in the war, several air-launched piloted V-1s, known as Reichenbergs, were built, but these were never used in combat. Hanna Reitsch made some flights in the modified V-1 Fieseler Reichenberg when she was asked to find out why test pilots were unable to land it and had died as a result. She discovered, after simulated landing attempts at high altitude, where there was air space to recover, that the craft had an extremely high stall speed, and the previous pilots with little high-speed experience had attempted their approaches much too slowly. Her recommendation of much higher landing speeds was then introduced in training new Reichenberg volunteer pilots. For this she was awarded the Iron Cross First Class The Reichenbergs were air-launched rather than fired from a catapult ramp.

It had the appearance of a standard V1 with the addition of cockpit, ailerons, landing skids and flight instruments. The pilot would have been airlifted by either Heinkel He 111 or a Focke-Wulf Fw 200. After release, the pilot would start the pulse jet engine, select a target, set the controls then bail out. The chances of survival were considered very small, yet many pilots volunteered. Possibly 175 of these piloted V1s were converted at Darmesbury after initial development by Deutsche Forschungsanstalt für Segelflug (DFS/German Research Institute for Sailplane Flight) at Ainring. When Hitler banned the use of the piloted V1, most converted models were scrapped. However, a few were captured by the Allied Technical Air Intelligence crews in Germany. At least one was sent to England, and two, possibly three, were sent to the US for inspection.

Three different versions of the piloted FZG-76 were produced. The Reichenburg I was a one or two-seat unpowered glider intended for use as a training glider for pilot training. Reichenburg II was a single-seat FZG-76 fitted with a pulse jet power plant. A skid was fitted for dead stick landing to gain valuable flying experience. Reichenburg III was to be the operational piloted version of the V1, fitted with the amatol warhead in the nose. The front windscreen had 75 mm (3.0 in) thick bulletproof glass for pilot protection. The V1 pilot's kit consisted of a parachute, helmet and life vest. A small case contained two small flares in a waterproof container.

=== Air launch by Ar 234 ===
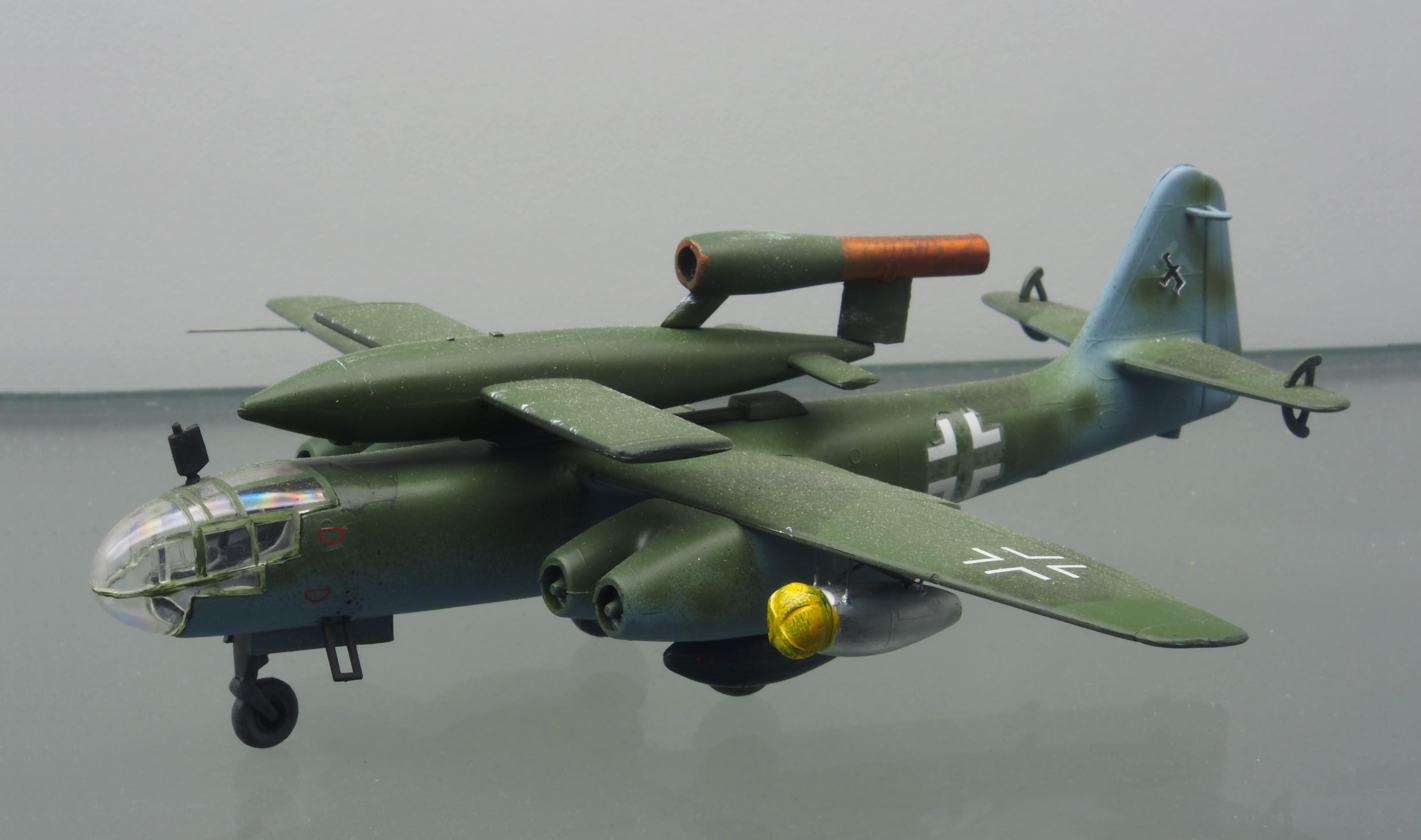
Model of an Arado Ar 234 carrying a V-1 at the Technikmuseum Speyer

There were plans, not put into practice, to use the Arado Ar 234 jet bomber to launch V-1s either by towing them aloft or by launching them from a "piggy back" position (in the manner of the Mistel, but in reverse) atop the aircraft. In the latter configuration, a pilot-controlled, hydraulically operated dorsal trapeze mechanism would elevate the missile on the trapeze's launch cradle about 2.4 m (8 ft) clear of the 234's upper fuselage. This was necessary to avoid damaging the mother craft's fuselage and tail surfaces when the pulsejet ignited, as well as to ensure a "clean" airflow for the Argus motor's intake. A somewhat less ambitious project undertaken was the adaptation of the missile as a "flying fuel tank" (Deichselschlepp) for the Messerschmitt Me 262 jet fighter, which was initially test-towed behind an He 177A Greif bomber. The pulsejet, internal systems and warhead of the missile were removed, leaving only the wings and basic fuselage, now containing a single large fuel tank. A small cylindrical module, similar in shape to a finless dart, was placed atop the vertical stabiliser at the rear of the tank, acting as a centre of gravity balance and attachment point for a variety of equipment sets. A rigid towbar with a pitch pivot at the forward end connected the flying tank to the Me 262. The operational procedure for this unusual configuration saw the tank resting on a wheeled trolley for take-off. The trolley was dropped once the combination was airborne, and explosive bolts separated the towbar from the fighter upon exhaustion of the tank's fuel supply. A number of test flights were conducted in 1944 with this set-up, but inflight "porpoising" of the tank, with the instability transferred to the fighter, meant that the system was too unreliable to be used. An identical usage of the V-1 flying tank for the Ar 234 bomber was also investigated, with the same conclusions reached. Some of the "flying fuel tanks" used in trials used a cumbersome fixed and spatted undercarriage arrangement, which (along with being pointless) merely increased the drag and stability problems already inherent in the design.

=== F-1 version ===
One variant of the basic Fi 103 design did see operational use. The progressive loss of French launch sites as 1944 proceeded and the area of territory under German control shrank meant that soon the V-1 would lack the range to hit targets in England. Air launching was one alternative used, but the most obvious solution was to extend the missile's range. Thus, the F-1 version developed. The weapon's fuel tank was increased in size, with a corresponding reduction in the capacity of the warhead. Additionally, the nose cones and wings of the F-1 models were made of wood, affording a considerable weight saving. With these modifications, the V-1 could be fired at London and nearby urban centres from prospective ground sites in the Netherlands. Frantic efforts were made to construct a sufficient number of F-1s in order to allow a large-scale bombardment campaign to coincide with the Ardennes Offensive, but numerous factors (bombing of the factories producing the missiles, shortages of steel and rail transport, the chaotic tactical situation Germany was facing at this point in the war, etc.) delayed the delivery of these long-range V-1s until February/March 1945. Beginning on 2 March 1945, slightly more than three weeks before the V-1 campaign finally ended, several hundred F-1s were launched at Britain from Dutch sites under Operation "Zeppelin". Frustrated by increasing Allied dominance in the air, Germany also employed F-1s to attack the RAF's forward airfields, such as Volkel, in the Netherlands.

=== FZG-76 version ===
There was also a turbojet-propelled upgraded variant proposed, meant to use the Porsche 109-005 low-cost turbojet engine with about 500 kgf (1,100 lbf) thrust.

== Success of operations ==
Almost 30,000 V-1s were made; by March 1944 they were each produced in 350 hours (including 120 for the autopilot), at a cost of just 4% of a V-2, which delivered a comparable payload. Approximately 10,000 were fired at England; 2,419 reached London, killing about 6,184 people and injuring 17,981. The greatest density of hits was received by Croydon, on the south-east fringe of London. Antwerp, Belgium was hit by 2,448 V-1s from October 1944 to March 1945.

== Intelligence reports ==
The codename "Flakzielgerät 76"—"Flak target apparatus" helped to hide the nature of the device, and some time passed before references to FZG 76 were linked to the V-83 pilotless aircraft (an experimental V-1) that had crashed on Bornholm in the Baltic and to reports from agents of a flying bomb capable of being used against London. Importantly, the Luxembourgish Resistance, as well as the Polish Home Army intelligence contributed information on V-1 construction and a place of development (Peenemünde). Initially, British experts were sceptical of the V-1 because they had considered only solid-fuel rockets, which could not attain the stated range of 210 kilometres (130 miles). However, they later considered other types of engine, and by the time German scientists had achieved the necessary accuracy to deploy the V-1 as a weapon, British intelligence had a very accurate assessment of it.

== Countermeasures in England ==
=== Anti-aircraft guns ===
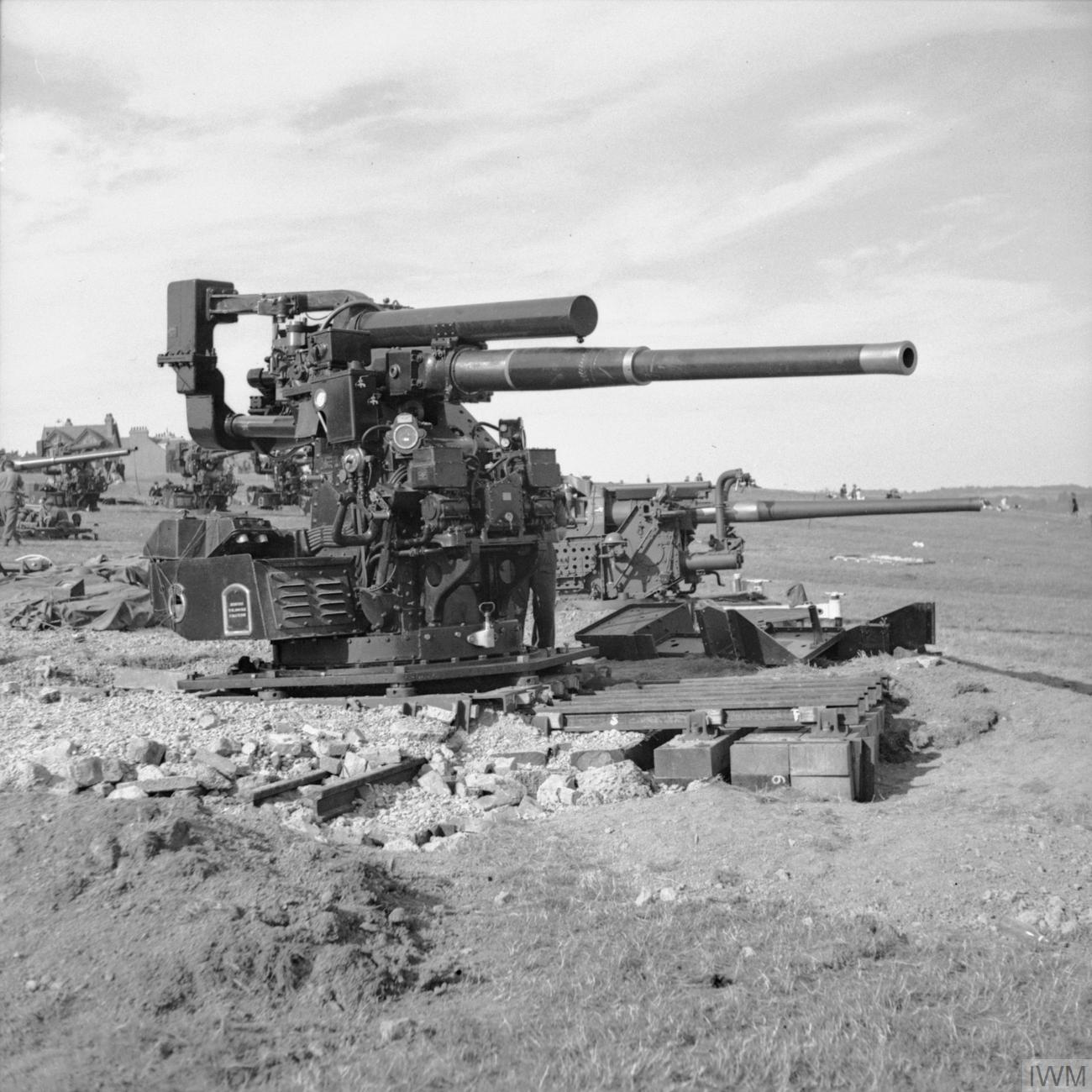
A battery of static QF 3.7-inch guns on railway-sleeper platforms at Hastings on the south coast of England, July 1944

The British defence against German long-range weapons was known by the codename Operation Crossbow with Operation Diver covering countermeasures to the V-1. Anti-aircraft guns of the Royal Artillery and RAF Regiment redeployed in several movements: first in mid-June 1944 from positions on the North Downs to the south coast of England, then a cordon closing the Thames Estuary to attacks from the east. In September 1944 a new linear defence line was formed on the coast of East Anglia, and finally in December there was a further layout along the Lincolnshire–Yorkshire coast. The deployments were prompted by changes to the approach tracks of the V-1 as launch sites were overrun by the Allies' advance.

On the first night of sustained bombardment, the anti-aircraft crews around Croydon were jubilant—suddenly they were downing unprecedented numbers of German bombers; most of their targets burst into flames and fell when their engines cut out. There was great disappointment when the truth was announced. Anti-aircraft gunners soon found that such small fast-moving targets were, in fact, very difficult to hit. The cruising altitude of the V-1, between 600 and 900 m (2,000 and 3,000 ft), meant that anti-aircraft guns could not traverse fast enough to hit the missile.

The standard British QF 94 mm (3.7 in) mobile gun could not cope with the altitude and speed of the V-1. However, the static version of the QF gun, designed for a permanent concrete platform, had a faster traverse. The cost and delay of installing new permanent platforms for the guns was found to be unnecessary as a temporary platform devised by the Royal Electrical and Mechanical Engineers and made from railway sleepers and rails was found to be adequate for the static guns, making them considerably easier to re-deploy as the V-1 threat changed. (Note: This was known as a Pyle platform, after the head of Anti-Aircraft Command, General Frederick Pile.)

The development of the proximity fuze and of centimetric, 3 gigahertz frequency gun-laying radars based on the cavity magnetron helped to counter the V-1's high speed and small size. In 1944, Bell Labs started delivery of an anti-aircraft predictor fire-control system based on an analogue computer, just in time for the Allied invasion of Europe.

These electronic aids arrived in quantity from June 1944, just as the guns reached their firing positions on the coast. Seventeen per cent of all flying bombs entering the coastal "gun belt" were destroyed by guns in their first week on the coast. This rose to 60 per cent by 23 August and 74 per cent in the last week of the month, when on one day 82 per cent were shot down. The rate improved from thousands of shells for every one V-1 destroyed to 100 for each. This mostly ended the V-1 threat. As General Frederick Pile put it in an April 5, 1946 article in the London Times: "It was the proximity fuse which made possible the 100 per cent successes that A.A. Command was obtaining regularly in the early months of last year...American scientists...gave us the final answer to the flying bomb."

=== Barrage balloons ===
Eventually about 2,000 barrage balloons were deployed, in the hope that V-1s would be destroyed when they struck the balloons' tethering cables. The leading edges of the V-1's wings were fitted with Kuto cable cutters, and fewer than 300 V-1s are known to have been brought down by barrage balloons.

=== Interceptors ===
The Defence Committee expressed some doubt as to the ability of the Royal Observer Corps to adequately deal with the new threat, but the ROC's Commandant Air Commodore Finlay Crerar assured the committee that the ROC could again rise to the occasion and prove its alertness and flexibility. He oversaw plans for handling the new threat, codenamed by the RAF and ROC as "Operation Totter", which included a proposal whereby ROC posts would fire Snowflake illuminating rocket flares in order to alert RAF fighters to the presence of a V-1.

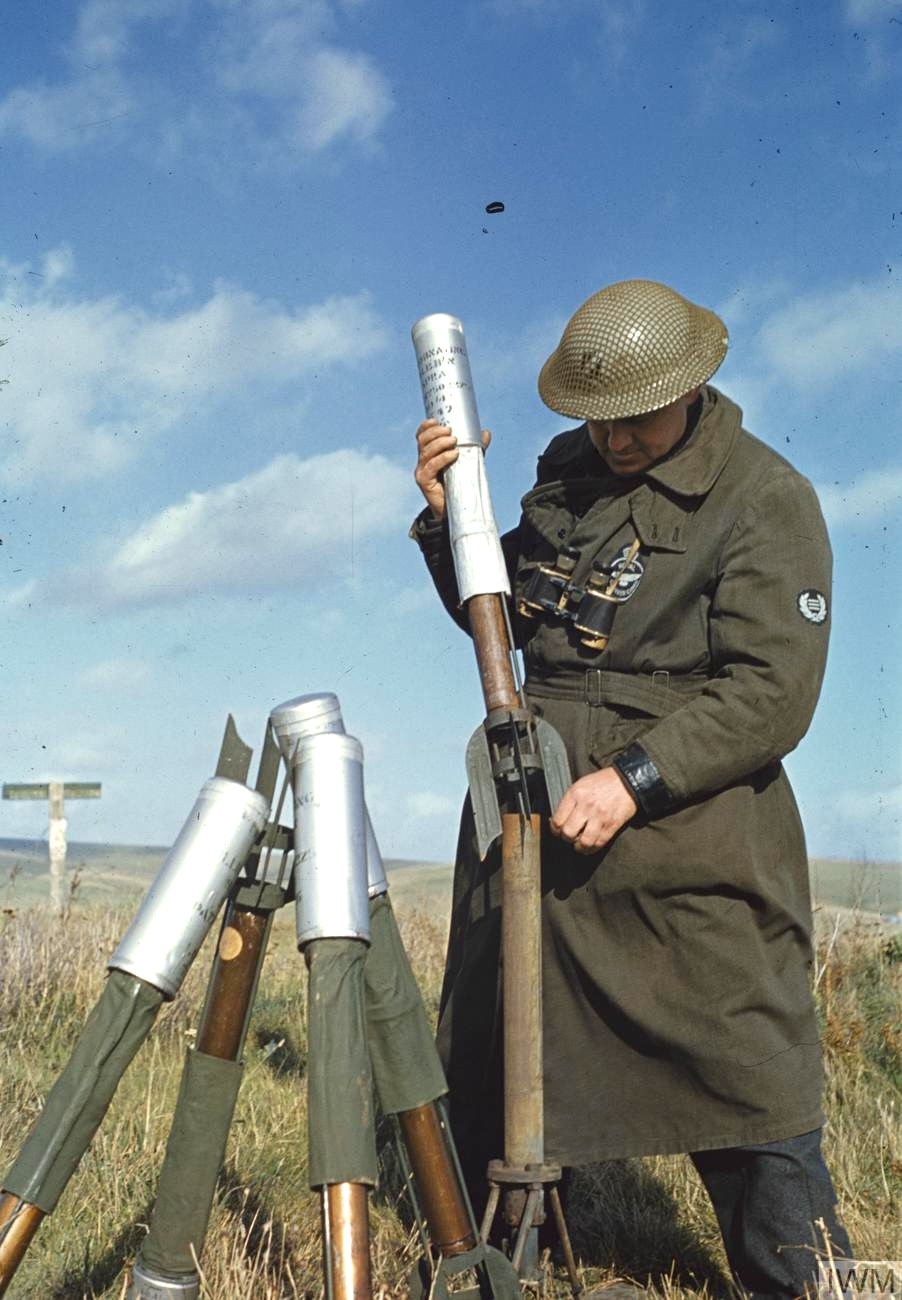
ROC personnel preparing a battery of Snowflake rocket flares.

Observers at the coast post of Dymchurch identified the very first of these weapons and within seconds of their report the anti-aircraft defences were in action. This new weapon gave the ROC much additional work both at posts and operations rooms. Eventually RAF controllers actually took their radio equipment to the two closest ROC operations rooms at Horsham and Maidstone, and vectored fighters direct from the ROC's plotting tables. The critics who had said that the Corps would be unable to handle the fast-flying jet aircraft were answered when these aircraft on their first operation were actually controlled entirely by using ROC information both on the coast and at inland.

The average speed of V-1s was 550 km/h (340 mph) and their average altitude was 1,000 to 1,200 m (3,300 to 3,900 ft). Fighter aircraft required excellent low altitude performance to intercept them and enough firepower to ensure that they were destroyed in the air (ideally, also from a sufficient distance, to avoid being damaged by the strong blast) rather than the V-1 crashing to earth and detonating. Most aircraft were too slow to catch a V-1 unless they had a height advantage, allowing them to gain speed by diving on their target.

When V-1 attacks began in mid-June 1944, the only aircraft with the low-altitude speed to be effective against it was the Hawker Tempest. Fewer than 30 Tempests were available. They were assigned to No. 150 Wing RAF. Early attempts to intercept and destroy V-1s often failed, but improved techniques soon emerged. These included using the airflow over an interceptor's wing to raise one wing of the V-1, by sliding the wingtip to within 15 cm (6 in) of the lower surface of the V-1's wing. If properly executed, this manoeuvre would tip the V-1's wing up, over-riding the gyro and sending the V-1 into an out-of-control dive. At least sixteen V-1s were destroyed this way (the first by a P-51 piloted by Major R. E. Turner of 356th Fighter Squadron on 18 June).

The Tempest fleet was built up to over 100 aircraft by September, and during the short summer nights the Tempests shared defensive duty with twin-engined de Havilland Mosquitos. Specially modified Republic P-47M Thunderbolts were also pressed into service against the V-1s; they had boosted engines (2,100 kW or 2,800 hp) and had half their .50 calibre (12.7 mm) machine guns and half their fuel tanks, all external fittings and all their armour plate removed to reduce weight. In addition, North American P-51 Mustangs and Griffon-engined Supermarine Spitfire Mk XIVs were tuned to make them fast enough. At night airborne radar was not needed, as the V-1 engine could be heard from 16 km (10 mi) away or more and the exhaust plume was visible from a long distance. Wing Commander Roland Beamont had the 20 mm cannon on his Tempest adjusted to converge at 270 m (300 yd) ahead. This was so successful that all other aircraft in 150 Wing were thus modified.

The anti-V-1 sorties by fighters were known as "Diver patrols" (after "Diver", the codename used by the Royal Observer Corps for V-1 sightings). Attacking a V-1 was dangerous: machine guns had little effect on the V-1's sheet steel structure, and if a cannon shell detonated the warhead, the explosion could destroy the attacker.

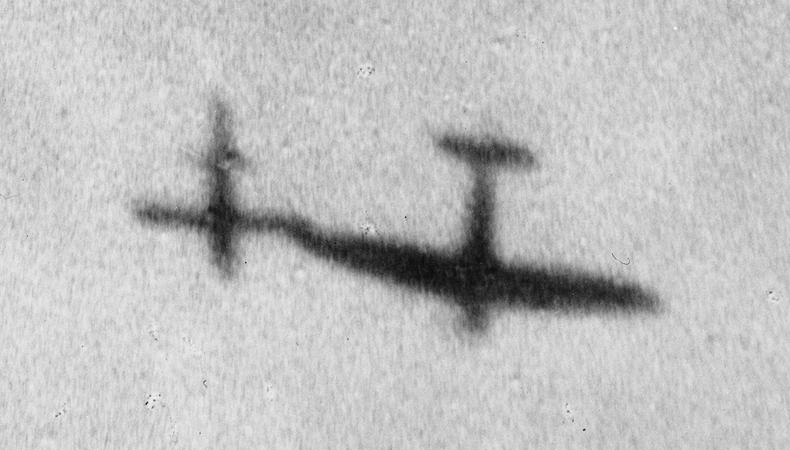
A Spitfire using its wingtip to "topple" a V-1 flying bomb

In daylight, V-1 chases were chaotic and often unsuccessful until a special defence zone was declared between London and the coast, in which only the fastest fighters were permitted. The first interception of a V-1 was by F/L J. G. Musgrave with a No. 605 Squadron RAF Mosquito night fighter on the night of 14/15 June 1944. As daylight grew stronger after the night attack, a Spitfire was seen to follow closely behind a V-1 over Chislehurst and Lewisham. Between June and 5 September 1944, a handful of 150 Wing Tempests shot down 638 flying bombs, with No. 3 Squadron RAF alone claiming 305. One Tempest pilot, Squadron Leader Joseph Berry (501 Squadron), shot down 59 V-1s, the Belgian ace Squadron Leader Remy Van Lierde (164 Squadron) destroyed 44 (with a further 9 shared), W/C Roland Beamont destroyed 31, and F/Lt Arthur Umbers (No. 3 squadron) destroyed 28. A Dutch pilot in 322 Squadron, Jan Leendert Plesman, son of KLM president Albert Plesman, managed to destroy 12 in 1944, flying a Spitfire.

The next most successful interceptors were the Mosquito (623 victories), Spitfire XIV (303), (Note: Squadrons 91, 322 (Dutch) and 610. The top ace was S/L Kynaston of 91 Sqn with 21 destroyed.) and Mustang (232). All other types combined added 158. Even though it was not fully operational, the jet-powered Gloster Meteor was rushed into service with No. 616 Squadron RAF to fight the V-1s. It had ample speed but its cannons were prone to jamming, and it shot down only 13 V-1s.

In late 1944 a radar-equipped Vickers Wellington bomber was modified for use by the RAF's Fighter Interception Unit as an airborne early warning and control aircraft. Flying at an altitude of 30 m (100 ft) over the North Sea at night, it directed Mosquito and Beaufighters charged with intercepting He 111s from Dutch airbases that sought to launch V-1s from the air.

=== Disposal ===
The first bomb disposal officer to defuse an unexploded V-1 was John Pilkington Hudson in 1944.

In 2024 a remotely operated vehicle was sent into the Bay of Lübeck, off the northern coast of Germany, where large quantities of munitions were dumped during demilitarization after World War II. It recorded images of nine different V-1 missiles on the seabed “in various stages of degradation,” according to the resulting study, published in 2025. The study reported that thriving epifaunal communities were growing on the dumped munitions.

=== Deception ===
To adjust and correct settings in the V-1 guidance system, the Germans needed to know where the V-1s were impacting. Therefore, German intelligence was requested to obtain this impact data from their agents in Britain. However, all German agents in Britain had been turned and were acting as double agents under British control.

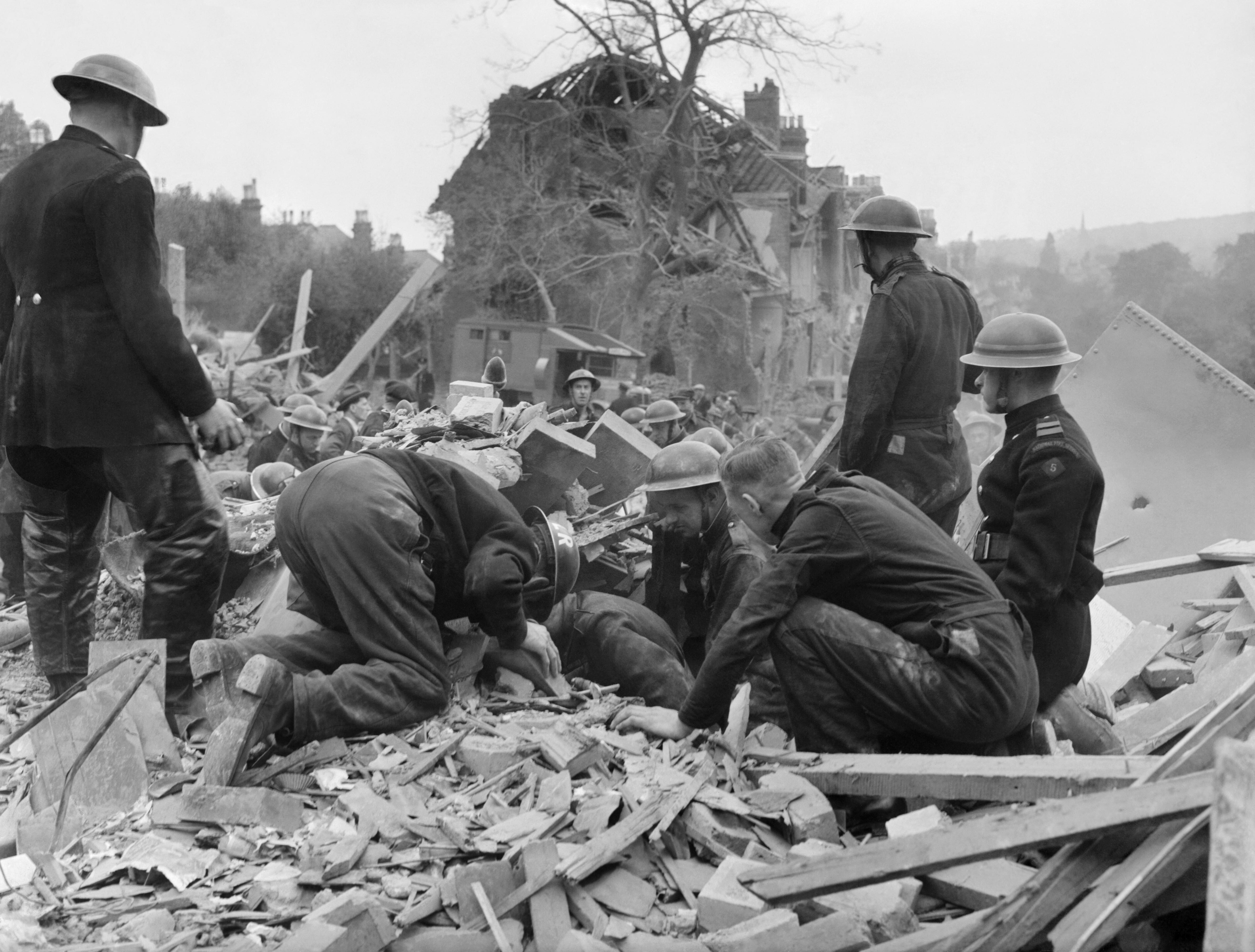
Aftermath of a V-1 bombing, London, 1944

On 16 June 1944 British double agent Garbo (Juan Pujol) was requested by his German controllers to give information on the sites and times of V-1 impacts, with similar requests made to the other German agents in Britain, Brutus (Roman Czerniawski) and Tate (Wulf Schmidt). If the Germans had been supplied this data, they would have been able to adjust their aim and correct any shortfall. However, the double agents would have been endangered because there was no plausible reason why they could not supply accurate data; the impacts would be common knowledge amongst Londoners and very likely reported in the press, which the Germans had ready access to through the neutral nations. As John Cecil Masterman, chairman of the Twenty Committee, commented, "If, for example, St Paul's Cathedral were hit, it was useless and harmful to report that the bomb had descended upon a cinema in Islington, since the truth would inevitably get through to Germany ..."

While the British decided how to react, Pujol played for time. On 18 June it was decided that the double agents would report the damage caused by V-1s fairly accurately and minimise the effect they had on civilian morale. It was also decided that Pujol should avoid giving the times of impacts and should mostly report on those which occurred in the northwest of London, to give the impression to the Germans that they were overshooting the target area.

While Pujol downplayed the extent of V-1 damage, trouble came from Ostro, an Abwehr agent in Lisbon who pretended to have agents reporting from London. He told the Germans that London had been devastated and had been mostly evacuated as a result of enormous casualties. The Germans could not perform aerial reconnaissance of London and believed his damage reports in preference to Pujol's. They thought that the Allies would make every effort to destroy the V-1 launch sites in France. They also accepted Ostro's impact reports. Due to Ultra, however, the Allies read his messages and adjusted for them.

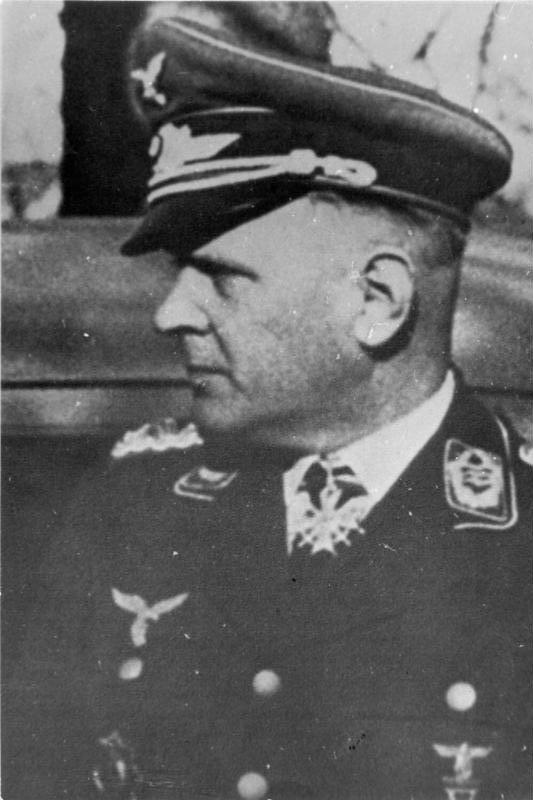
Max Wachtel

A certain number of the V-1s fired had been fitted with radio transmitters, which had clearly demonstrated a tendency for the V-1 to fall short. Oberst Max Wachtel, commander of Flak Regiment 155 (W), which was responsible for the V-1 offensive, compared the data gathered by the transmitters with the reports obtained through the double agents. He concluded, when faced with the discrepancy between the two sets of data, that there must be a fault with the radio transmitters, as he had been assured that the agents were completely reliable. It was later calculated that if Wachtel had disregarded the agents' reports and relied on the radio data, he would have made the correct adjustments to the V-1's guidance, and casualties might have increased by 50 per cent or more.

The policy of diverting V-1 impacts away from central London was initially controversial. The War Cabinet refused to authorise a measure that would increase casualties in any area, even if it reduced casualties elsewhere by greater amounts. It was thought that Churchill would reverse this decision later (he was then away at a conference); but the delay in starting the reports to Germans might be fatal to the deception. So Sir Findlater Stewart of Home Defence Executive took responsibility for starting the deception programme immediately, and his action was approved by Churchill when he returned.

== Effect ==
The use of land-launched V-1s against Great Britain ended on 1 September after which the campaign continued using air-launched missiles. In total, 10,492 V-1s were launched against Britain, with a nominal aiming point of Tower Bridge. 7,500 incoming missiles were observed by the British defenders of which 1,847 were downed by fighters, 1,878 were destroyed by anti aircraft fire and 232 struck barrage balloons. 2,419 V-1s reached the London civil defence region, inflicting 6,184 fatalities and 17,981 serious injuries. On 28 March 1945, the last V-1 reached London.

== Assessment ==
Unlike the V-2, the V-1 was a cost-effective weapon for the Germans as it forced the Allies to spend heavily on defensive measures and divert bombers from other targets. More than 25% of Combined Bomber Offensive's bombs in July and August 1944 were used against V-weapon sites, often ineffectively. In early December 1944, American General Clayton Bissell wrote a paper that strongly demonstrated the cost-effectiveness for the Germans of the V-1 when compared with conventional bombers. The following is a table he produced:

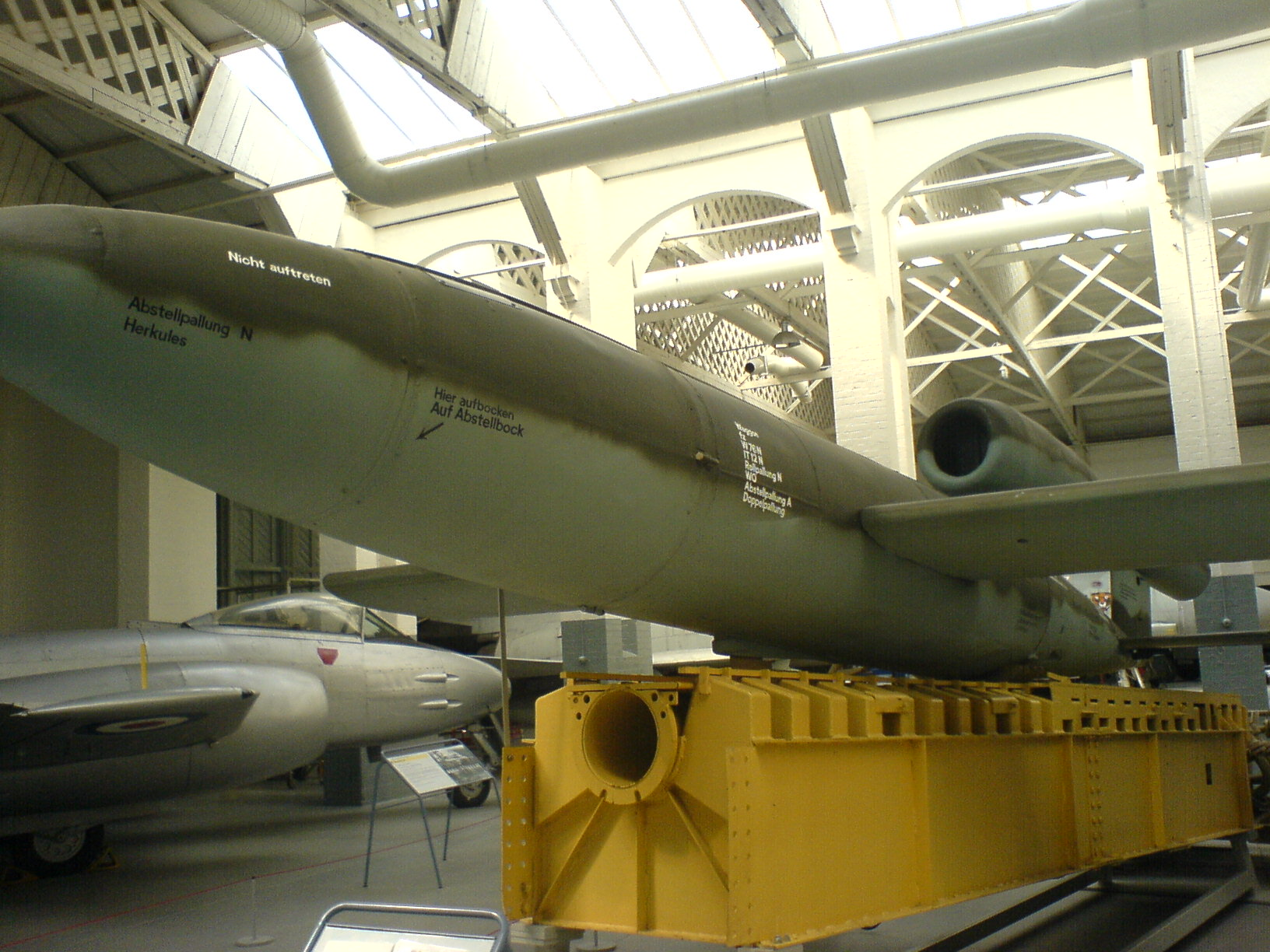
A V-1 and launching ramp section on display at the Imperial War Museum Duxford (2009)

Blitz (12 months) vs V-1 flying bombs (2¾ months)
	Blitz	V-1
1. Cost to Germany
Sorties	90,000	8,025
Weight of bombs tons	61,149	14,600
Fuel consumed tons	71,700	4,681
Aircraft lost	3,075	0
Personnel lost	7,690	0
2. Results
Structures damaged/destroyed	1,150,000	1,127,000
Casualties	92,566	22,892
Rate casualties/bombs tons	1.6	1.6
3. Allied air effort
Sorties	86,800	44,770
Aircraft lost	1,260	351
Personnel lost	2,233	805

The statistics of this report, however, have been the subject of some dispute. The V-1 missiles launched from bombers were often prone to exploding prematurely, occasionally resulting in the loss of the aircraft to which they were attached. The Luftwaffe lost 77 aircraft in 1,200 of these sorties.

Wright Field technical personnel reverse-engineered the V-1 from the remains of one that had failed to detonate in Britain and the Republic-Ford JB-2 was being delivered by early 1945. After the end of the war in Europe it was in consideration for use against Japan. General Hap Arnold of the United States Army Air Forces was concerned that this weapon would make his long-range bombers less important, since they were much cheaper and could be built of steel and wood, in 2,000 man-hours and approximate cost of $600 (equivalent to $11,000 in 2025).

== Belgian attacks ==
The attacks on Antwerp and Brussels began in October 1944, with the last V-1 launched against Antwerp on 30 March 1945. The shorter range improved the accuracy of the V-1 which was 10 kilometres (6 mi) deviation per 160 kilometres (100 mi) of flight, the flight level was also reduced to around 900 m (3,000 ft). The Port of Antwerp was one of the biggest in the world and was the main entrepot for Allied supplies further progression of Allied armies into Germany.

=== Countermeasures at Antwerp ===
Both British (80th Anti-Aircraft Brigade) and US Army anti-aircraft batteries (30th AAA Group) were sent to Antwerp together with a searchlight regiment. The zone of command under the 21st Army Group was called "Antwerp-X" and given the object of protecting an area with a radius of 6,400 m (7,000 yd) covering the city and dock area. Initially attacks came from the south-east, accordingly a screen of observers and searchlights was deployed along the attack azimuth, behind which were three rows of batteries with additional searchlights.

US units deployed SCR-584 radar units controlling four 90 mm guns per battery using an M9 director to electrically control the battery guns. British gun batteries were each equipped with eight QF 3.7-inch AA gun (94 mm) and two radar units, preferably the US SCR-584 with M9 director as it was more accurate than the British system. The radar was effective from 26,000 m (28,000 yd), the M9 director predicted the target location position based on course, height and speed which combined with the gun, shell and fuse characteristics predicted an impact position, adjusted each gun and fired the shell.

In November attacks began from the north-east and additional batteries were deployed along the new azimuths, including the 184th AAA Battalion (United States) brought from Paris. Additional radar units and observers were deployed up to 64 km (40 mi) from Antwerp to give early warning of V-1 bombs approaching. The introduction of the VT fuse in January 1945 improved the effectiveness of the guns and reduced ammunition consumption. From October 1944 to March 1945, 4,883 V-1s were detected. Of these, only 4.5 per cent fell into the designated protected area.

== Japanese developments ==
In 1943 an Argus pulsejet engine was sent to Japan by German submarine. The Aeronautical Institute of Tokyo Imperial University and the Kawanishi Aircraft Company conducted a joint study of the feasibility of mounting a similar engine on a piloted plane. The resulting design was named Baika ("plum blossom") but bore no more than a superficial resemblance to the Fi 103. Baika never left the design stage, but technical drawings and notes suggest that, an air-launched version with the engine under the fuselage, a ground-launched version that could take off without a ramp and a submarine launched version with the engine moved forwards were considered.

== Post-war ==
=== France ===
After reverse-engineering captured V-1s in 1946, the French began producing copies for use as target drones, starting in 1951. These were called the ARSAERO CT 10 and were smaller than the V-1. The CT 10 could be ground-launched using solid rocket boosters or air-launched from a LeO 45 bomber. More than 400 were produced, some of which were exported to the UK, Sweden, and Italy.

=== Soviet Union ===
The Soviet Union captured V-1s when they overran the Blizna test range in Poland, as well as from the Mittelwerk. The 10Kh was their copy of the V-1, later called Izdeliye 10. Initial tests began in March 1945 at a test range in Tashkent, with further launches from ground sites and from aircraft of improved versions continuing into the late 1940s. The inaccuracy of the guidance system when compared with new methods such as beam-riding and TV guidance saw development end in the early 1950s.

The Soviets also worked on a piloted attack aircraft based on the Argus pulsejet engine of the V-1, which began as a German project, the Junkers EF 126 Lilli, in the latter stages of the war. The Soviet development of the Lilli ended in 1946 after a crash that killed the test pilot.

=== United States ===
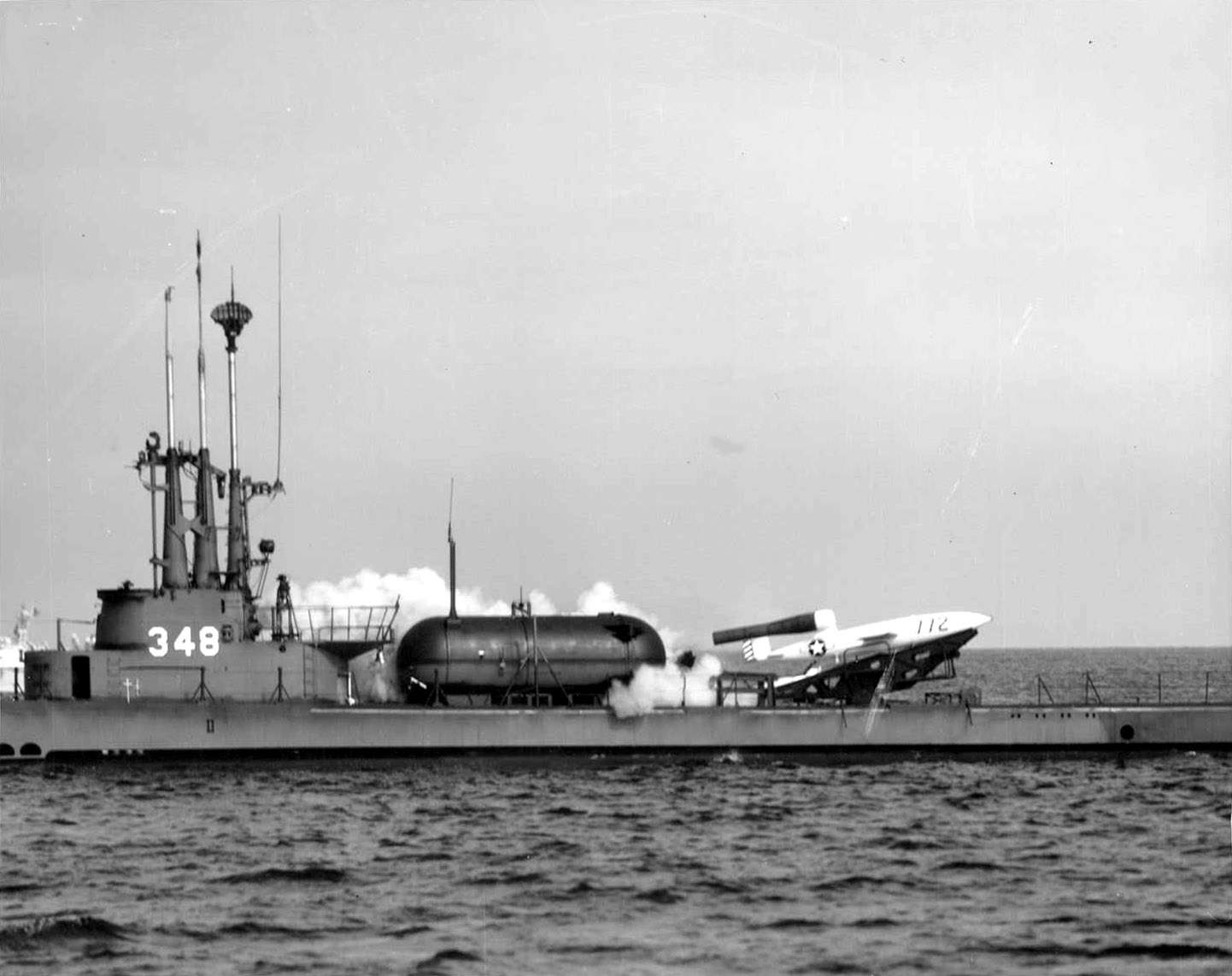
A KGW-1 being fired from USS Cusk in 1951

The United States reverse-engineered the V-1 in 1944 from salvaged parts recovered in England during June. By 8 September, the first of thirteen complete prototype Republic-Ford JB-2, was assembled at Republic Aviation. The United States JB-2 was different from the German V-1 in only the smallest of dimensions, with only the forward pulsejet support pylon visibly differing in shape from the original German pilotless ordnance design. The wingspan was only 65 mm (2 1/2 in) wider and the length was extended less than 0.6 m (2 ft). The difference gave the JB-2 5.64 m^{2} (60.7 sq ft) of wing area versus 5.1 m^{2} (55 sq ft) for the V-1.

A navalised version, designated KGW-1, was developed to be launched from LSTs as well as escort carriers (CVEs) and long-range 4-engine reconnaissance aircraft. Waterproof carriers for the KGW-1 were developed for launches of the missile from surfaced submarines. Both the USAAF JB-2 and Navy KGW-1 were put into production and were planned to be used in the Allied invasion of Japan (Operation Downfall). However, the surrender of Japan obviated the need for its use. After the end of the war, the JB-2/KGW-1 played a significant role in the development of more advanced surface-to-surface tactical missile systems such as the MGM-1 Matador and SSM-N-8 Regulus.

== Operators ==
Nazi Germany

- Luftwaffe

== Surviving examples ==
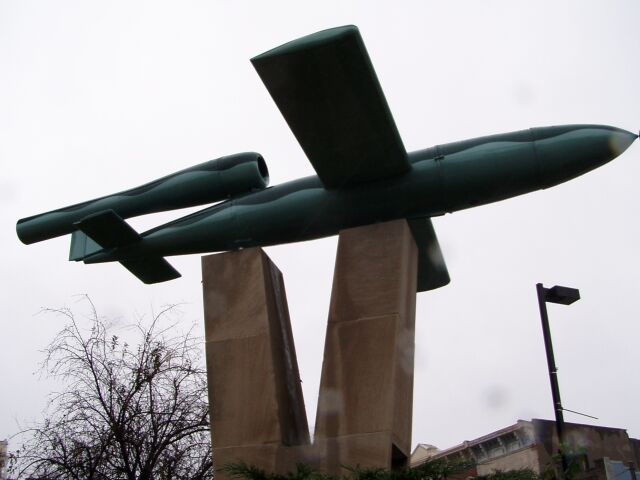
War Memorial in Greencastle, Indiana

Australia

- The Australian War Memorial in Canberra, Australia

Belgium

- The Stampe en Vertongen Museum at Antwerp International Airport has a V-1 on display.

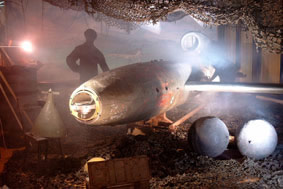
V-1 flying bomb on display at the Stampe & Vertongen Museum

Canada

- Atlantic Canada Aviation Museum in Halifax, Nova Scotia
- Canadian War Museum, manned version Fieseler Fi 103R Reichenberg, collected by Farley Mowat

Denmark

- The Danish War Museum (Krigsmuseet, formerly Tøjhusmuseet) in Copenhagen

France

- The Grand Bunker Museum in Ouistreham, near Caen and Sword Beach, displays a V-1 flying bomb.
- Blockhaus d'Éperlecques, near Saint-Omer. Although this was intended as a V-2 launch site the museum on the site has a display devoted to the V-1, including a V-1 cruise missile and an entire launch ramp.
- Le Val Ygot at Ardouval, north of Saint-Saëns. Disabled by Allied bombing in December 1943, before completion. Remains of blockhouses, with recreated launch ramp and mock V1.
- La Coupole, near Saint-Omer, has a V-1 that it was lent by the Science Museum in London.
- The Overlord Museum in Colleville-sur-Mer, near the Normandy American Cemetery and Memorial and Omaha Beach, displays a French copy of the V-1; actually a CT 10 target drone.
- Tosny Museum, near Les Andelys, displays a restored Fieseler 103 A1, launched on 13 June from Pont-Montauban base and crashed in the mud without exploding after flying 10 km.

Germany

- Deutsches Museum in Munich

The Netherlands

- Overloon War Museum in Overloon
- Museum Vliegbasis Deelen in Schaarsbergen
- National Military Museum in Soesterberg has a V1 and a V1 Reichenberg

New Zealand

- Auckland War Memorial Museum, Auckland
- Museum of Transport and Technology, Auckland

Sweden

- A V-1 in the Arboga Missile museum

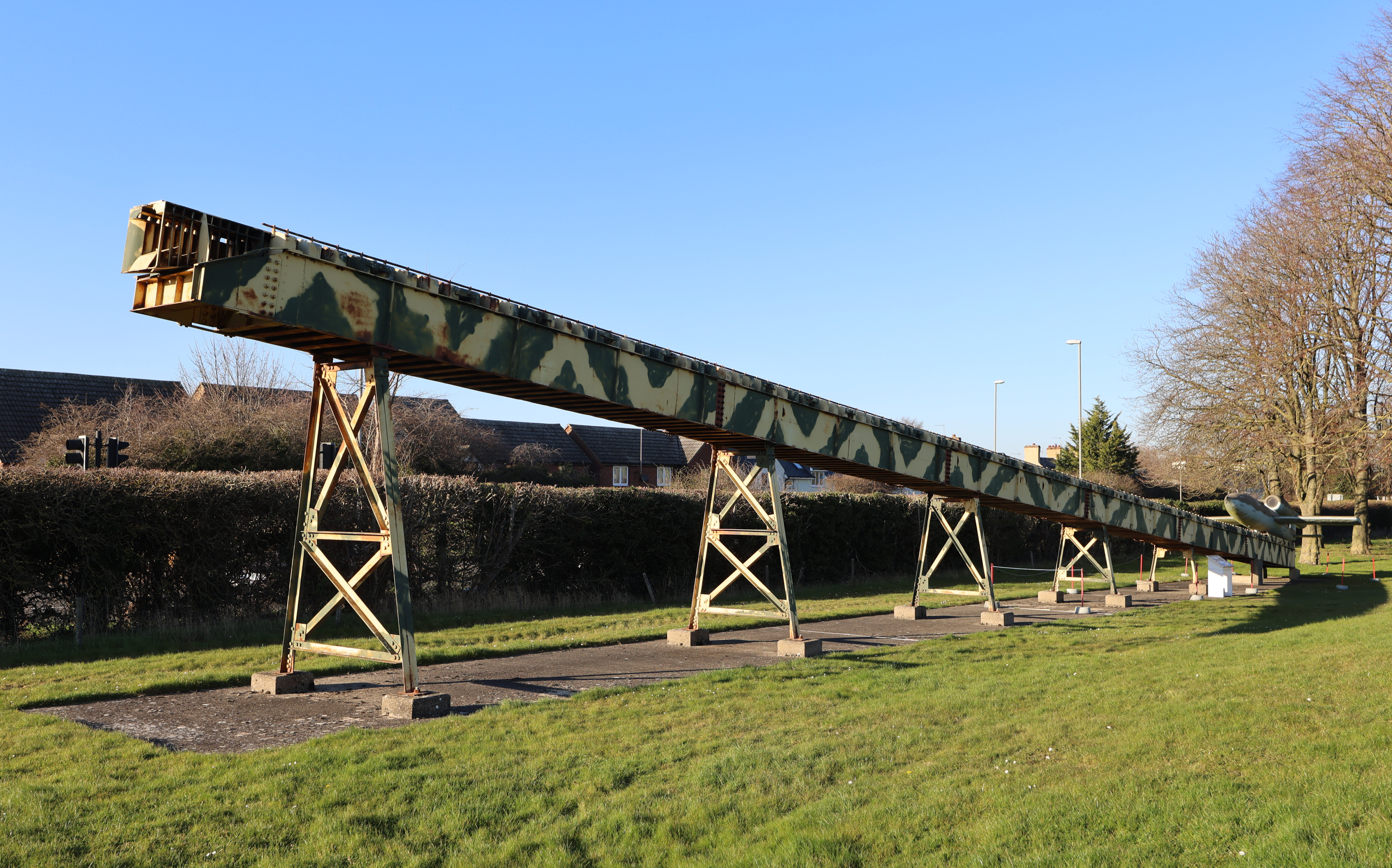
V-1 launch ramp recreated at the Imperial War Museum, Duxford

Switzerland

- A restored original V-1 is on display, as well as one of only six worldwide remaining original Reichenberg (Re 4–27), at the Swiss Military Museum in Full-Reuenthal.

United Kingdom

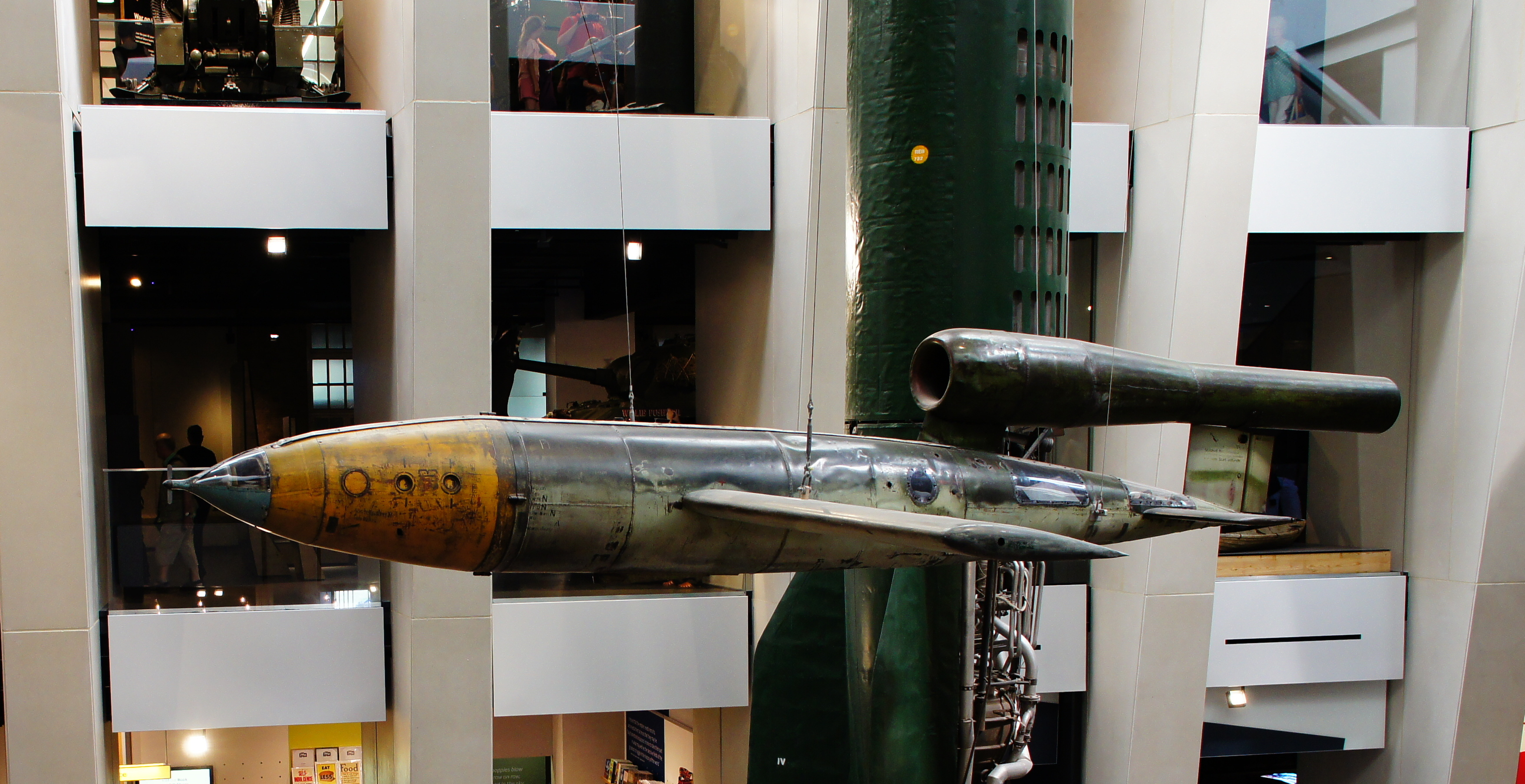
V-1 flying bomb on display at the Imperial War Museum London

- A reproduction V-1 is located at the Eden Camp in North Yorkshire.
- Fi-103 serial number 442795 is on display at the Science Museum, London. It was presented to the museum in 1945 by the War Office.
- A V-1 is on a partial ramp section, at the Imperial War Museum Duxford; the museum also has a partially recreated launch ramp with a mock–up V-1 displayed outside.
- A V-1 is on display with a V-2 at the Royal Air Force Museum London
- a V-1 is on display at the other RAF Museum site, Royal Air Force Museum Midlands in Shropshire
- A Fieseler Fi 103R Reichenberg—the piloted version of the V1—is usually on display at Headcorn (Lashenden) Airfield's Air Warfare Museum
- A V-1 is on display with a V-2 in the new Atrium of the Imperial War Museum, London
- The Aeropark at East Midlands Airport also has a V-1 on display.
- A V-1 replica and original launch rail and equipment is on display at the Kent Battle of Britain Museum
- A V-1 is on display at the RAF Manston History Museum
- A V-1 replica is displayed at The Muckleburgh Collection near Weybourne in Norfolk. According to the collection's website, the replica is displayed on a section of the original Peenemunde launch ramp.

United States

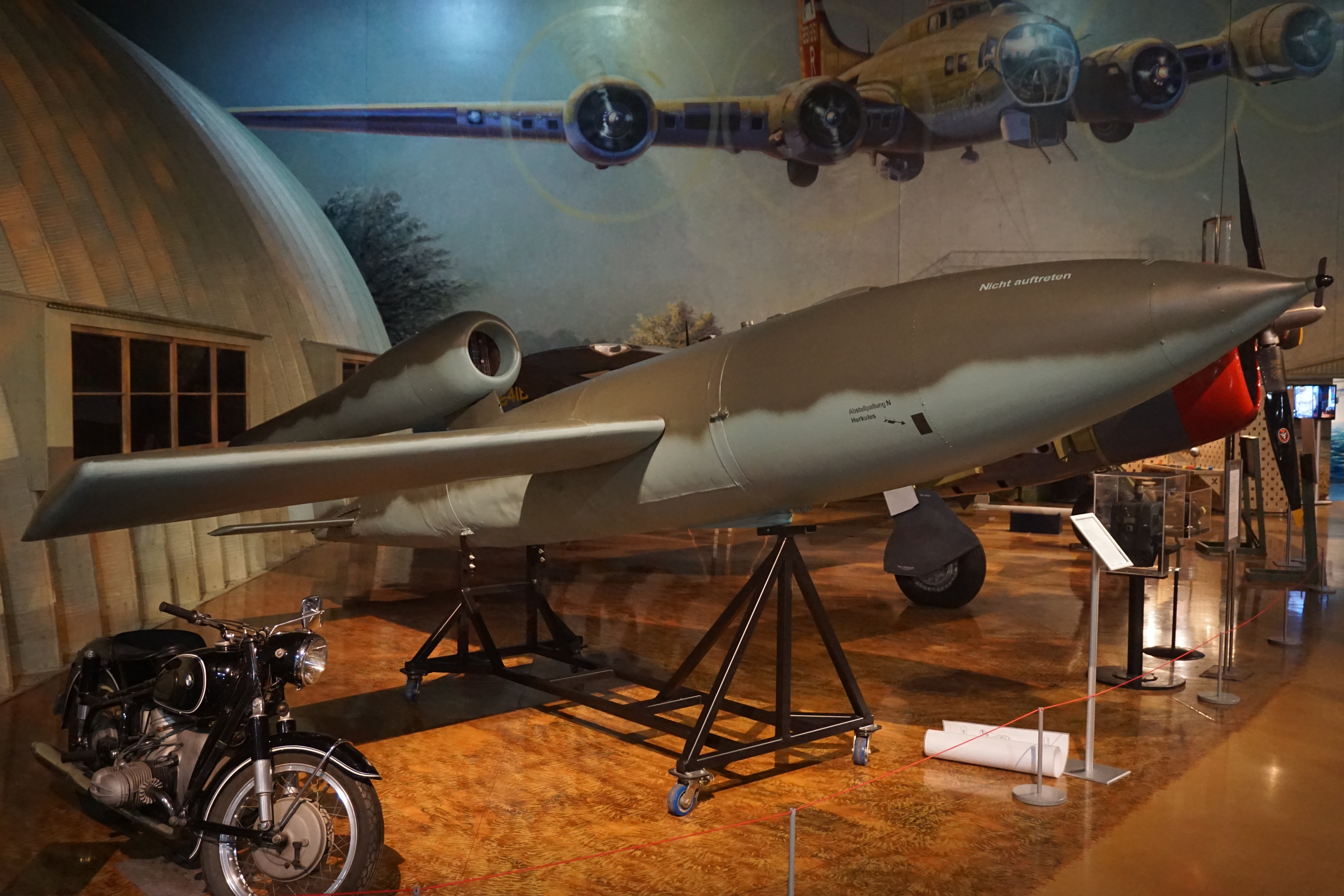
V-1 on display at the Air Zoo

- A V-1 is on display at the US Army Air Defense Artillery Museum, Fort Sill, Oklahoma.
- FZG-76 is on display as a war memorial at the southwest corner of the Putnam County Courthouse in Greencastle, Indiana.
- The Smithsonian's National Air and Space Museum on the National Mall in Washington, DC.
- A V-1 is on display at the Air Zoo in Portage, Michigan.
- The Cosmosphere in Hutchinson, Kansas has a V-1 display which consists of a post-war "hybrid" of German-machined and American parts. In particular, it has a JB-2 Loon-style forward engine support fairing.
- A V-1 is also located at the Fantasy of Flight aviation museum in Polk City, Florida
- V-1 #121536 is on display at the Pima Air and Space Museum, in Tucson, Arizona.
- A V-1 and Fieseler Fi 103R Reichenberg are on display at the Flying Heritage Collection in Everett, Washington.
- A V-1 is on display at the Military Aviation Museum in Virginia Beach, Virginia.
- A V-1 is on display at the Museum of Flight in Seattle, Washington.

== See also ==
- Aggregat (rocket family)
- Amerika Bomber
- Argus Fernfeuer
- Fieseler Fi 103R Reichenberg – The piloted version of the V-1
- Fritz X
- Henschel Hs 293
- Hewitt-Sperry Automatic Airplane
- Kettering "Bug" Aerial Torpedo
- List of German guided weapons of World War II
- List of jet aircraft of World War II
- List of missiles
- Mitsubishi Ki-147
- Ohka
- Operation Paperclip
- RAE Larynx
- Republic-Ford JB-2
- SCR-584 radar
- V-1 flying bomb facilities
- V-2 rocket
- V-3 cannon
