= Argus Fernfeuer =

Fernfeuer
- Type: Long-range surface-to-surface missile; aerial mine-layer
- Place of origin: Germany

Production history
- Designer: Fritz Gosslau
- Designed: October 1939
- Manufacturer: Argus Motoren GmbH
- No. built: None

Specifications
- Mass: 3000 kg (6,614 lb) maximum
- Length: 9.5 m (31.17 ft) (est)
- Height: 1 m (3.28 ft) (est)
- Wingspan: 10 m (32.81 ft) (est.)
- Crew: Unmanned
- Maximum firing range: 1000 km (621miles) (est)
- Engine: Argus As 410; 465 hp
- Flight ceiling: 5000m (16,405 ft)
- Guidance system: Line of sight radio-control or radio beam following

The Argus Fernfeuer (long-range fire) concept was proposed in 1939 as an unmanned aerial vehicle (UAV) for mine-laying. Later roles were planned for bombing, the dropping of torpedoes and long-range reconnaissance. Development was halted in 1941 but the project, also known as Erfurt, evolved into the V1.

== Development ==
Arising from the Argus As 292 project, the Argus Fernfeuer was also designed by Fritz Gosslau. During the testing of the small As 292 drone, Gosslau proposed an aircraft-sized UAV capable of delivering a one tonne drop charge over long distances. Control was either by line-of-sight radio control or by radio beam direction. A crewed aircraft, flying clear of local defenses, would signal the UAV to release the drop-load. The Fernfeuer aircraft would then return to base.

Guidance expertise would have been from C. Lorenz; airframe advice and construction by Arado. A crewed variant, intended as a command aircraft, was also included in the proposal.

Presented to Reichsluftfahrtministerium (RLM) on November 9, 1939. Despite initial interest in the Fernfeuer concept, the RLM informed Gosslau and the Argus company that the project was to be shelved. Development abandoned by January 1941 in favor of the V-1 flying bomb.
