= HDE =

HDE may refer to:

- Hedge End railway station, in England
- Henry Draper Extension, an astronomical catalogue
- High dose estrogen, a hormonal therapy
- Higher Diploma in Education
- Home Defence Executive
- Humanitarian Device Exemption
- German Trade Association
