= AS-5 =

AS-5, As 5 or AS.5 may refer to:

- Airspeed AS.5 Courier, a British light aircraft of the 1930s
- Argus As 5, a German aircraft engine
- AS-5 Kelt, NATO reporting name of Soviet KSR-2 rocket
- USS Beaver (AS-5), a United States Navy submarine tender
