= Woldemar Voigt (engineer) =

German-American aerospace engineer

- Born: February 7, 1907; Göttingen, Germany
- Died: June 1980 (aged 73)
- Spouse: Clara Hollerung
- Engineering career
- Discipline: Aerospace engineering

Woldemar Voigt (10 February 1907 – June 1980) was a German-American aerospace engineer, who was responsible for some of the advanced swept wing German jet-powered aircraft at the end of World War II.

== Early life ==
His grandfather was the German physicist Woldemar Voigt (1850-1919), known for Voigt notation, Voigt profile and the Voigt effect, and who introduced the term tensor in 1898. He was born in February 1907 in Göttingen; he was the oldest of four brothers. His father was Karl Voigt (1879–1965).

He studied at technical high school in Darmstadt, in the south of Hesse.

== Career ==
=== Klemm ===
He started working for Klemm in 1931, designing the Klemm Kl 35.

=== Messerschmitt ===
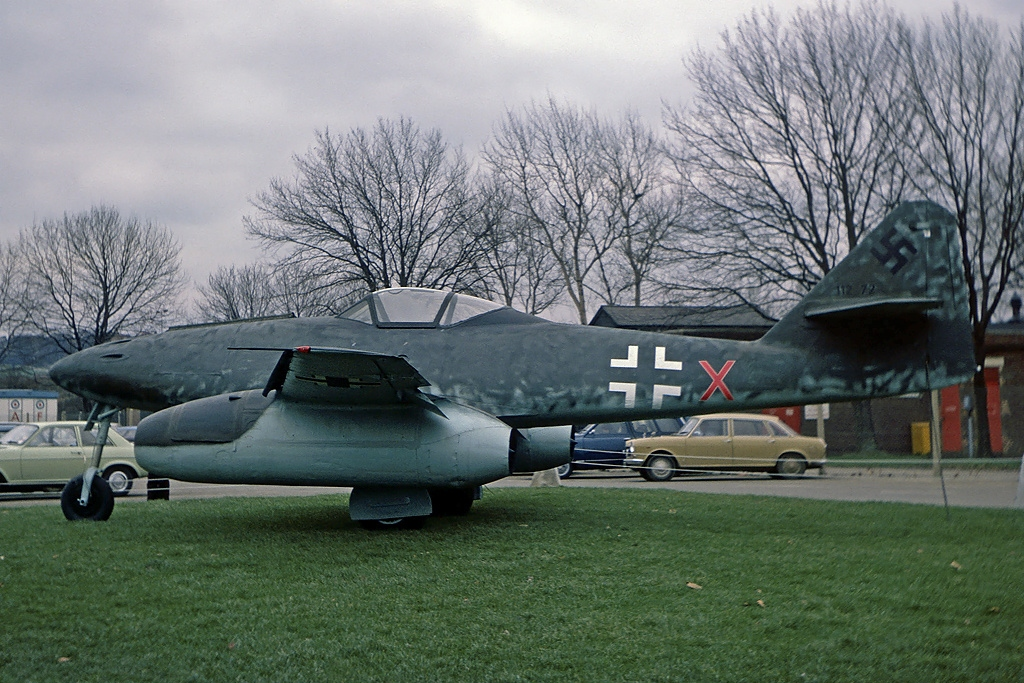
Messerschmitt Me 262 in January 1976 at the RAF Museum in north London; Woldemar Voigt was head of the aircraft's design team

He joined Messerschmitt, in Bavaria, in 1933.

He was the project leader for the designs of the Messerschmitt Me 264 (four-engined bomber), Messerschmitt Me 328, and the infamous rocket-engined Messerschmitt Me 163 Komet. He oversaw the design of the swept-wing Messerschmitt P.1101 jet fighter, which was never built (by the Germans), but provided a valued contribution to early American swept-wing jet fighters. From October 1938, Messerschmitt had been looking at designs for jet fighter aircraft. He was promoted head of the Projects Department from 1939. At Messerschmitt, other designers included Wolfgang Degel.

In October 1943, the Messerschmitt design department moved to Oberammergau in southern Bavaria, on the Austrian border. The NATO School has been on the site since 1953.

Swept wings had been invented by Adolf Busemann in October 1935. The first British aircraft with swept wings was the de Havilland DH 108 in October 1945, a reconfigured de Havilland Vampire, adapted by John Carver Meadows Frost.

=== Vought ===
After the war, Voigt was relocated to the United States via the Operation Paperclip. He went to work for the American aircraft company Vought, with one of his first designs being the Vought F7U Cutlass, which was developed from German scientists' data on swept-wing jet aircraft.

== Personal life ==
He married Clara Hollerung (born 12 September 1911) in 1935. He died in June 1980 in America, aged 73. He had lived in Annapolis, Maryland.

== See also ==
- List of German aircraft projects, 1939–45
- List of German inventors and discoverers
- Richard Vogt (aircraft designer), later worked for Boeing

Business positions
Preceded by Robert Lusser	Head of New Projects at Messerschmitt; 1939 - 1945	Succeeded by
