= Argus As 292 =

Early German UAV

As 292

General information
- Type: Unmanned anti-aircraft target drone; short-range reconnaissance UAV
- Manufacturer: Argus Motoren GmbH
- Primary user: Luftwaffe
- Number built: At least 100

History
- Manufactured: 1942-1943
- First flight: 9 June 1937 (Unguided); 14 May 1939 (Remotely controlled)
- Retired: 1945
- Variant: Argus Fernfeuer

The Argus As 292 was originally developed in 1939 as a small, remote-controlled unmanned anti-aircraft target drone. A short-range reconnaissance version was also developed. The success of the project led to the Argus Fernfeuer UAV proposal.

== Development ==
The As 292 was designed by Dr. Ing. Fritz Gosslau at Argus Motoren GmbH. Work began on the drone in 1937 at the Argus-Flugmotorenwerke (Argus aero-engine factory) in Berlin-Reinickendorf. Apart from Argus, two other companies were involved in the production of the As 292: Deutsche Forschungsanstalt für Segelflug (German: German Research Institute for Gliding) supplied technical assistance with the airframe construction; C. Lorenz Company with the radio-control system. At DFS the drone was referred to as Model 12.

As a target for anti-aircraft gunners, the As 292 was given the designation of Flakzielgerät 43 (Flak-Target Apparatus 43). An earlier effort in 1937 at developing an aircraft-sized target drone, the Fieseler Fi 157, ended in failure.

The first As 292 made the type's first unguided flight on 9 June 1937. The first remotely-controlled flight was made on 14 May 1939. During flight testing, cameras were fitted to a prototype As 292. Testing of this Aufklärungsgerät (reconnaissance device) version started in early 1939 and first aerial photography was made on 2 October 1939. After successful demonstrations Argus received an initial production order for 100 As 292 aircraft in late 1939. Ordered aircraft were delivered in 1942–43. The airframe was of simple tubular construction; the high dihedral wings were removable for when the As 292 was being transported.

== Operators ==
Nazi Germany

- Luftwaffe

== Specifications ==
General characteristics

- Length: 2.4 m (7 ft 10 in)
- Wingspan: 2.4 m (7 ft 10 in)
- Empty weight: 27 kg (60 lb)
- Powerplant: 1 × Argus Motoren GmbH , 2.2 kW (3 hp) 6–7 hp (4.5–5.2 kW)

Performance

- Maximum speed: 100 km/h (62 mph, 54 kn)
- Endurance: 30 minutes

Avionics

- 3 kg (7 lb) control system
