= Argus (automobile) =

The Argus was a German automobile manufactured by Internationale Automobilzentrale KG Jeannin & Co from 1902 to 1904, Argus Motoren-Gesellschaft Jeannin & Co from 1904 to 1906, and then Argus Motoren-Gesellschaft m.b.H. from November 1906 to 1945.

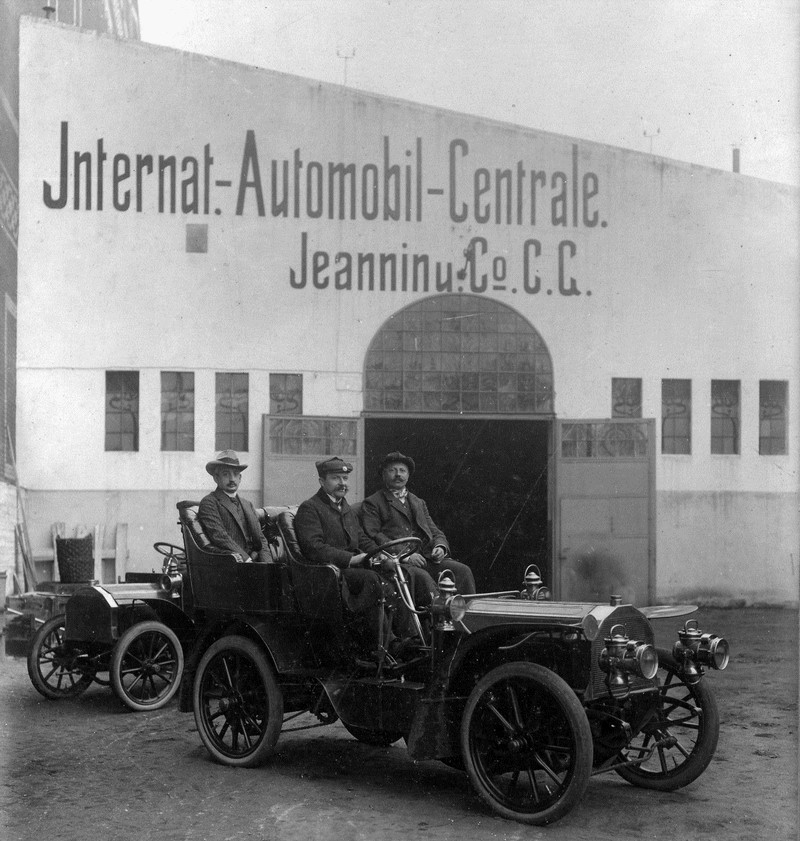
Argus automobile

The company was founded by Henri Jeannin in Berlin, and originally built copies of Panhard & Levassor cars; they also featured P&L engines, and most of the other components of the vehicles came from France. In 1903 the company began producing engines of its own design; Argus cars now had 2,380 cc two-cylinder engines, and 4,960 cc and 9,240 cc four-cylinder engines.

The company went on to produce marine and aero engines. In 1929 they briefly returned to car engines making some for Horch.
