= Lusser's law =

Probability product law of series components

Lusser's law in systems engineering is a prediction of reliability. Named after engineer Robert Lusser, and also known as Lusser's product law or the probability product law of series components, it states that the reliability of a series of components is equal to the product of the individual reliabilities of the components, if their failure modes are known to be statistically independent. For a series of N components, this is expressed as:

$$R_s=\prod_{i=1}^N r_i=r_1 \times r_2 \times r_3 \times ... \times r_n$$

where R_{s} is the overall reliability of the system, and r_{n} is the reliability of the n^{th} component.

If the failure probabilities of all components are equal, then as Lusser's colleague Erich Pieruschka observed, this can be expressed simply as:

$$R_s=r^N$$

Lusser's law has been described as the idea that a series system is "weaker than its weakest link", as the product reliability of a series of components can be less than the lowest-value component.

For example, given a series system of two components with different reliabilities — one of 0.95 and the other of 0.8 — Lusser's law will predict a reliability of

$$R_s = 0.95 \times 0.8 = 0.76$$

which is lower than either of the individual components.
