= Argus As 5 =

1920s German piston aircraft engine

As 5
- Argus As-5 at the Polish Aviation Museum in Kraków.
- Type: 24-cylinder double W
- National origin: Germany
- Manufacturer: Argus Motoren
- First run: 1924
- Number built: 3

The Argus As 5 was a large 24-cylinder 6 blocks' star aircraft engine, designed and built in Germany in the early 1920s by Argus Motoren.

== Design and development ==
Following the Armistice of 1918, Germany continued to build aircraft and engines under the control of the Military Inter-Allied Commission of Control. For use on very large aircraft, Argus designed and built the As 5 WW-24 water-cooled piston engine.

The As 5 consisted of six banks of cylinders arranged around a common crankshaft with a single output shaft. Each cylinder drove the crankshaft through a master and slave big end, similar to most radial engines. The top and bottom sets of three cylinder banks were set at 45° to each other with a 90° separation between the outermost banks.

Individual cylinders with sheet metal water jackets shared the aluminium alloy heads, four to a bank. Inlet and exhaust valves were actuated by shaft driven overhead camshafts. The aluminium alloy crankcase was split top and bottom.

Although some testing was carried out, the As 5 never flew and was abandoned along with the very large aircraft projects it was intended to power.

== Engines on display ==
A single example survives on display at the Polish Aviation Museum in Kraków, Poland.

== Specifications ==
Data from Pearce.

=== General characteristics ===
- Type: WW-24, 24 cylinder six bank double W, water-cooled
- Bore: 160 mm (6.3 in)
- Stroke: 195 mm (7.7 in)
- Displacement: 94.1 L (5,740 cu in)
- Dry weight: 1,100 kg (2,400 lb)

=== Components ===
- Cooling system: Water-cooled

=== Performance ===
- Power output: 1,120 kW (1,500 hp) at 1,800 rpm
- Compression ratio: 5.6:1
