= Home Defence Executive =

The Home Defence Executive (H.D.E.) was formed on 10 May 1940 under General Sir Edmund Ironside, Commander-in-chief Home Forces, to organise the defence of Britain from invasion by the Axis powers

== See also ==
- Home Guard (United Kingdom)
