= Argus Motoren =

German engine manufacturer

- Industry: Aerospace
- Founded: 7 November 1906
- Founder: Henri Jeannin
- Defunct: End of World War II
- Fate: Shut down
- Headquarters: Berlin, Germany
- Key people: Henri Jeannin (managing director)
- Products: Aircraft engines
- Number of employees: Unknown
- Parent: Horch

Argus Motoren was a German manufacturing firm known for their series of small inverted-V engines and the Argus As 014 pulsejet for the V-1 flying bomb.

== History ==
Started in Berlin in 1906 as a subsidiary of Henri Jeannin's automobile business, Argus Motoren company spun off entirely in November 1906. Their early products were car and boat engines, but later that year they were contracted to produce engines for the French airship, Ville de Paris, supplying them with a converted boat motor. They turned increasingly to the aviation market, and were widely used by 1910, receiving an order from Sikorsky for one of his large airplanes under construction in Russia. During World War I Argus produced engines for the German army and air corps.

After World War I the company manufactured automobile engines and acquired a majority interest in Horch Automobile in 1919. In 1926 they resumed aircraft engine design, producing a series of inverted inline and V engines. Although all were at the "low-power" end of the market by the start of World War II, they saw extensive use in training aircraft and other utility roles. Most famous of these designs are the Argus As 10, used in the Fieseler Fi 156 Storch, in the Arado Ar 66 and in the Focke-Wulf Fw 56 Stösser; and the Argus As 410, used on many German trainers, including the Arado Ar 96 and the Focke-Wulf Fw 189.

Argus provided also disc brakes, patented by Hermann Klaue (1912-2001), for the Arado Ar 96 landing gear and the Tiger I tank drive train.

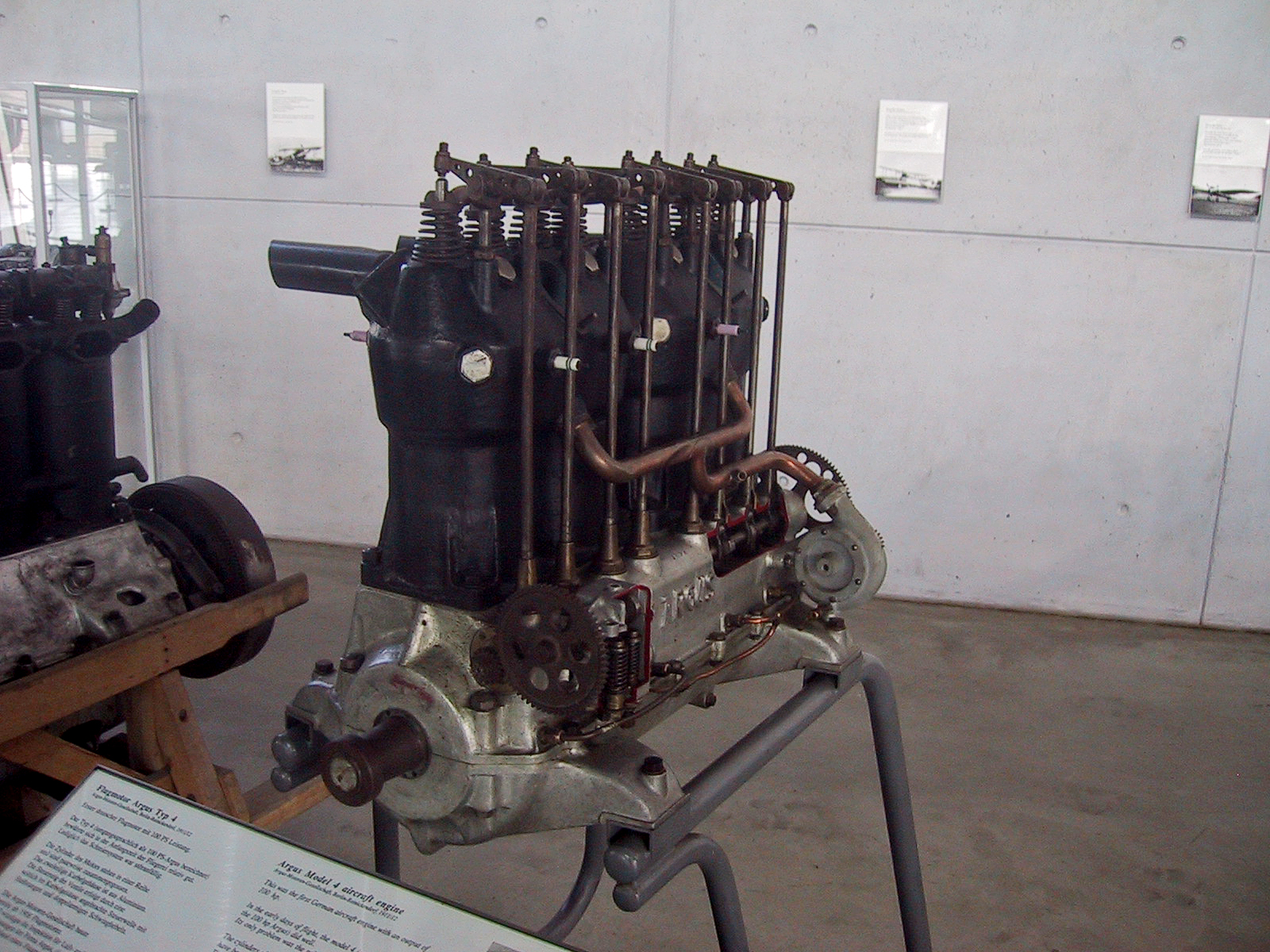
100 hp Argus As I engine

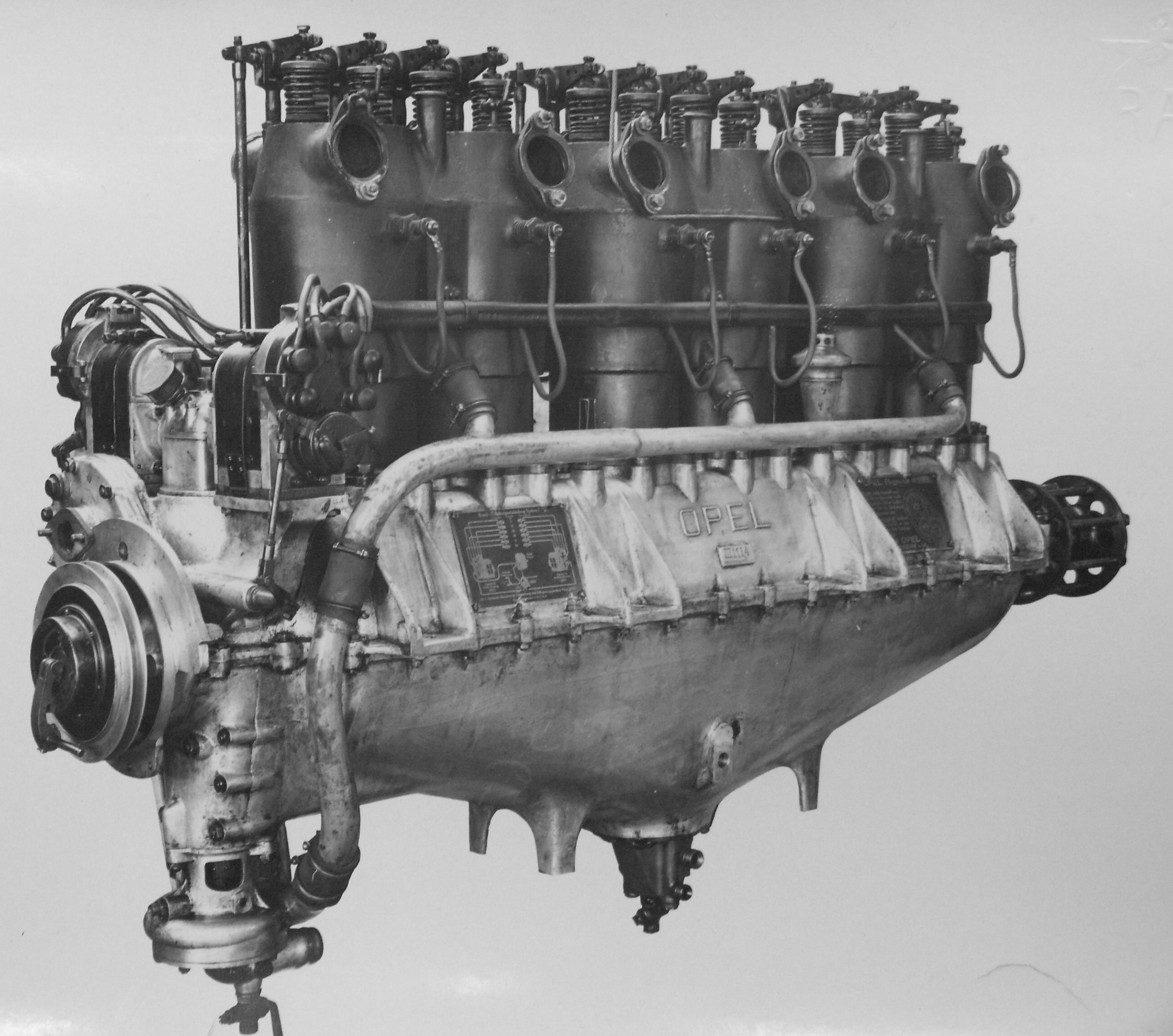
Argus As III, made under licence by Opel

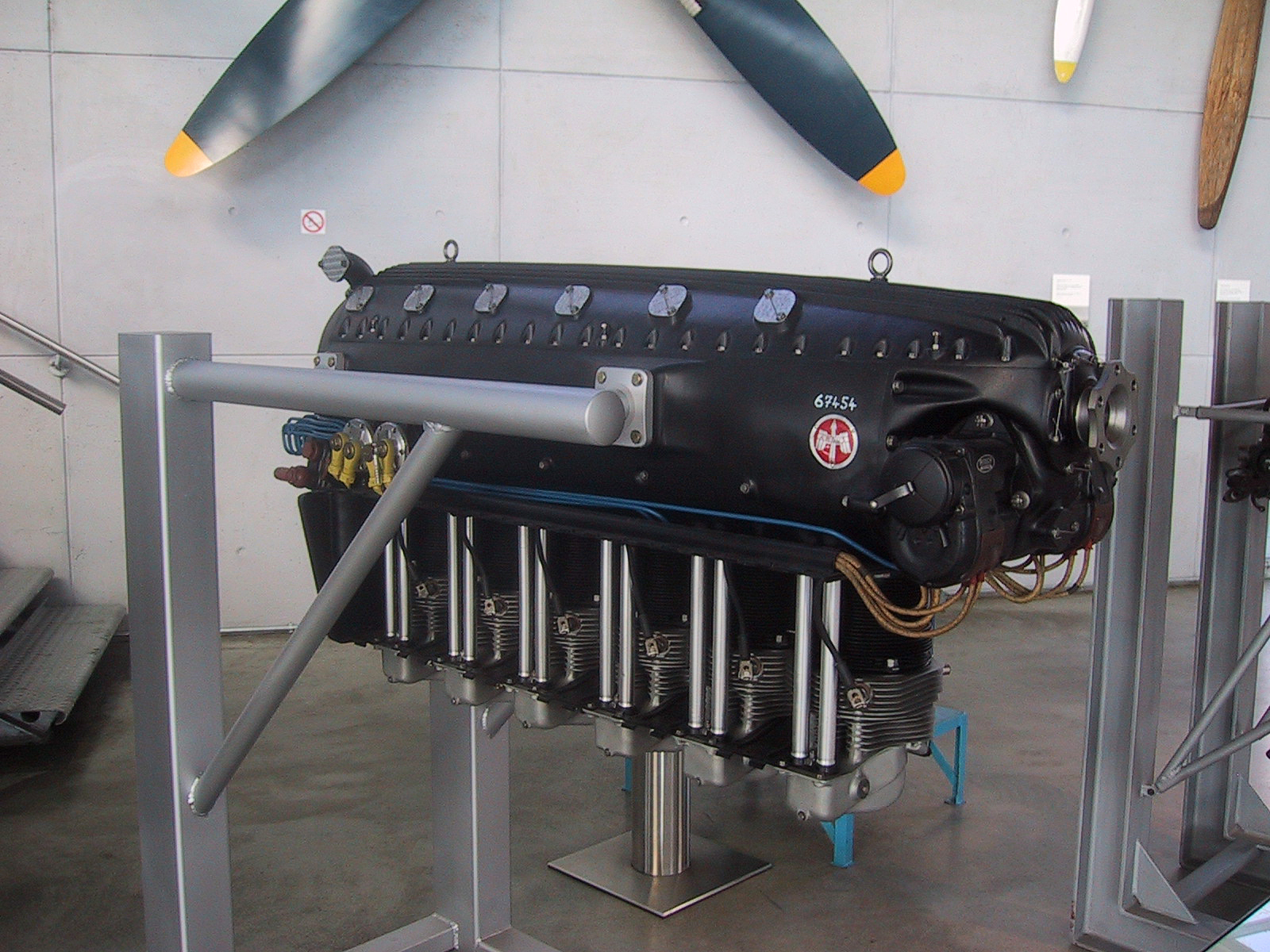
Argus As 17a

The Berlin-Reinickendorf subcamp of Sachsenhausen concentration camp provided labor for the Argus-Werke.

== Argus aircraft engines ==
Pre-War
Argus 1908 4-cylinder:
Argus As I: 4-cylinder, 100 hp, year 1913
World War I
Argus As II: 6-cylinder upright inline, 120 hp, year 1914
Argus As IIa: 140 hp, particulars unknown
Argus As III: 6-cylinder upright inline, 180 hp
Argus As IV (1916): 6-cylinder upright inline 250 hp, production uncertain
Argus As IV: 8-cylinder upright V, 225 hp, limited production
Post-World War I
Argus As 5: double W, 3+3 banks of 4 cylinders each; never materialised
Argus As 7: 9R 700 hp
Argus As 8: 4-cylinder inverted inline
Argus As 10: 8-cylinder inverted V
Argus As 12: 16H 550 hp
Argus As 16: 4-cylinder inverted inline 40 hp
Argus As 17: 6-cylinder inverted inline 225 hp / 285 hp
Argus As 401: development and renumbering of the As 10
Argus As 402:
Argus As 403: radial engine project, not built.
Argus As 410: 12-cylinder inverted V
Argus As 411: 12-cylinder inverted V
Argus As 412: 24-cylinder H-block, prototyped
Argus As 413: similar to 412, never built
Argus 109-014: pulse jet engine for V-1 flying bomb and Tornado boat
Argus 109-044: Pulse jet similar to the Argus 109-014, but with "square intake" main valve bank at front

== Unmanned Aerial Vehicles ==
- Argus As 292
- Argus Fernfeuer

== See also ==
- List of aircraft engines

== Bibliography ==
- Huth, Fritz (1920). Motoren für Flugzeuge und Luftschiffe (in German) (3rd ed.). Berlin: R. C. Schmidt & co. OCLC 2116726.
- Argus Motoren-Gesellschaft m.b.H (1916). Der Argus Flugmotor (in German).
- Reichs-Marine-Amt (1918). Allgemeine Baubestimmungen für Seeflugzeuge der Kaiserlichen Marine (A.B.B.) : Heft 2. Die Maschinenanlage (in German). Berlin: Gedruckt in der Reichsdruckerei. p. 8.
