= Fritz Gosslau =

German engineer (1898–1965)

Fritz Gosslau (25 March 1898 – 1 December 1965) was a German engineer, known for his work on the V-1 flying bomb.

== Study ==
Gosslau was born in Berlin. In 1923, he completed his engineering studies by gaining a diploma from the Königliche Technische Hochschule in Berlin-Charlottenburg (now Technische Universität Berlin). In 1926, he obtained his PhD on the topic Rechnerische und experimentelle Untersuchungen über Wärmebeherrschung und Leistungssteigerung in luftgekühlten Flugmotorenzylindern – calculated and experimental studies on heat control and performance improvement in air-cooled aircraft engine cylinders.

== Work ==
During the 1930s, Gosslau worked on the development of aircraft engines at Siemens. When the company abandoned production of aircraft engines, he moved to Argus Motoren Gesellschaft. Gosslau was part of the construction team of the Argus As 410 and 411 engines. He was also involved in the construction of a 24-cylinder air-cooled engine that developed 3,500 horsepower. In early 1937, Gosslau developed proposals for a remote, unmanned missile for special military use. This remote controlled target aircraft completed its maiden flight on 14 July 1939. On 9 November 1939, he proposed the development of a motorized wing-mounted missile providing a range of several hundred kilometers, and through radio-navigation, a high accuracy. For this missile, Gosslau used a pulse jet engine (Pulsationsschubrohres). By the start of production, he had developed this into a highly reliable unit.

From 1942, Gosslau participated in the development team of the Fieseler Fi 103, also called V1 – an unmanned, explosive payload missile. Towards the end of World War II, Gosslau became involved with its construction as a suicide weapon, and his name is connected with the establishment of the Leonidas Squadron.

After the war, Gosslau joined Dürkopp, the motorcycle manufacturer, where he was chief designer from 1948. In 1954, he moved to the Heinkel Flugzeugwerke (aircraft manufacturer) and took over the development of new engines. In 1958, after the engine development branches of Heinkel and Messerschmitt were acquired by Junkers Flugzeug- und Motorenwerke (aircraft and engine manufacturer), Gosslau became a director of Junkers until 1963, when they were converted to a stock company, a technical board of the Munich-based company.

Gosslau died in Grünwald, Bavaria, aged 67.
