= Argus As 014 =

1940s German pulsejet aircraft engine

As 014
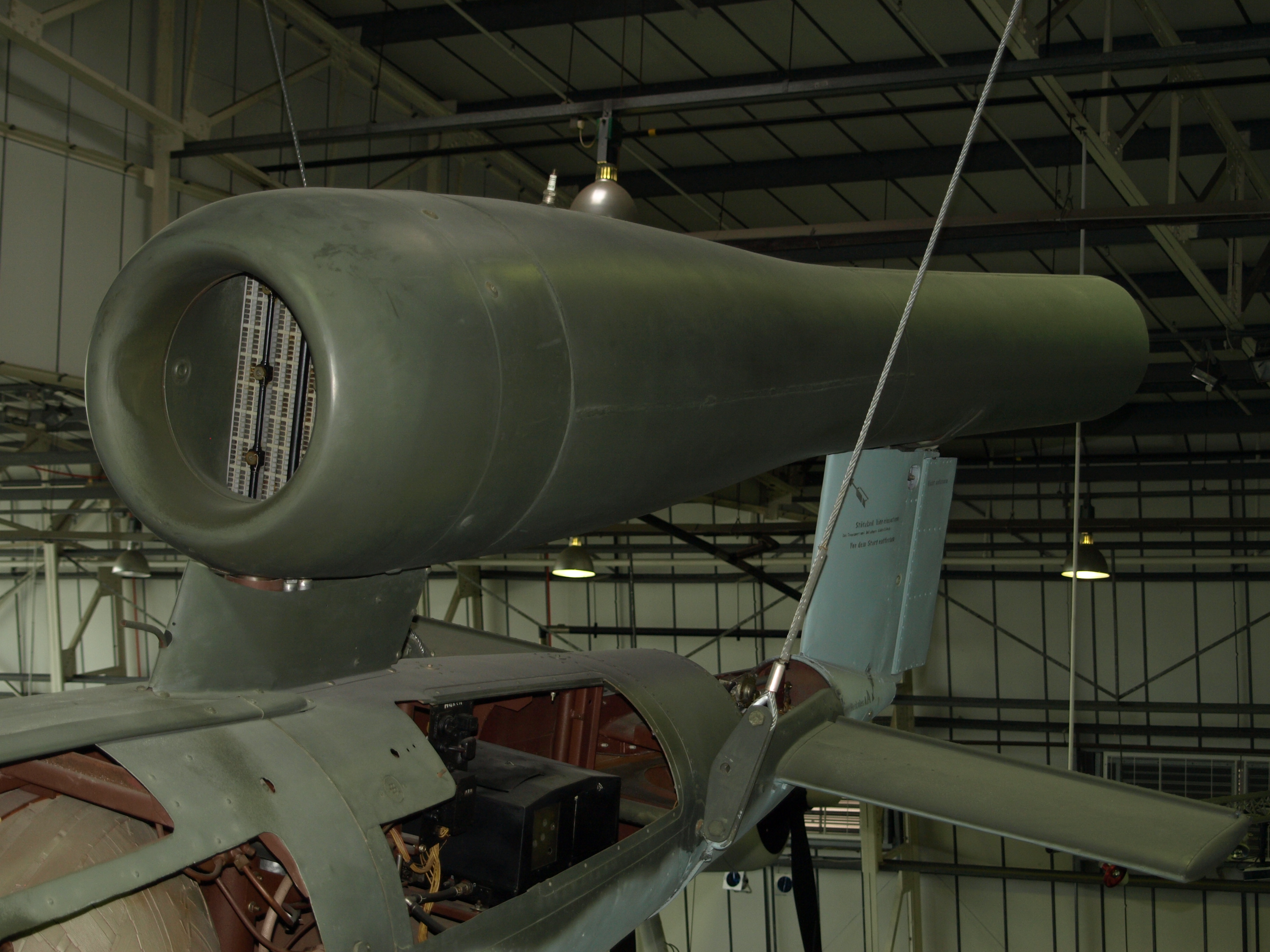
- Argus As 014 of the V-1 flying bomb on display at the Royal Air Force Museum London
- Type: Pulsejet
- Manufacturer: Argus Motoren
- First run: 1941
- Major applications: Fieseler Fi 103 (V-1); Fieseler Fi 103R Reichenberg
- Number built: 31,100
- Developed into: Kawanishi Maru Ka10

The Argus As 014 (designated 109-014 by the RLM) was a pulsejet engine used on the German V-1 flying bomb of World War II, and the first model of pulsejet engine placed in mass production. License manufacture of the As 014 was carried out in Japan in the latter stages of World War II, as the Kawanishi Maru Ka10 for the Kawanishi Baika kamikaze jet.

The United States reverse-engineered the design for the Ford PJ31 powering the Republic-Ford JB-2 cruise missile and the experimental USAAF-developed JB-4 television-guided bomb.

== Development ==
The origins of the Argus As 014 lie in 1928, when Munich inventor Paul Schmidt began work on a new design of pulse jet engine. Schmidt received a patent on his design in 1931 and received support from the German Air Ministry in 1933. In 1934, along with Professor Georg Madelung, Schmidt proposed a "flying bomb" to be powered by his pulse jet to the Ministry and received a development contract the following year. In 1938 he demonstrated a pulse jet–powered pilotless bomber, but the project was shelved by the Air Ministry as the prototype lacked range and accuracy and was expensive to construct. That same year, however, the Argus Company began work on a flying bomb using Schmidt's engine. Schmidt later joined Argus in 1940.

== Design ==
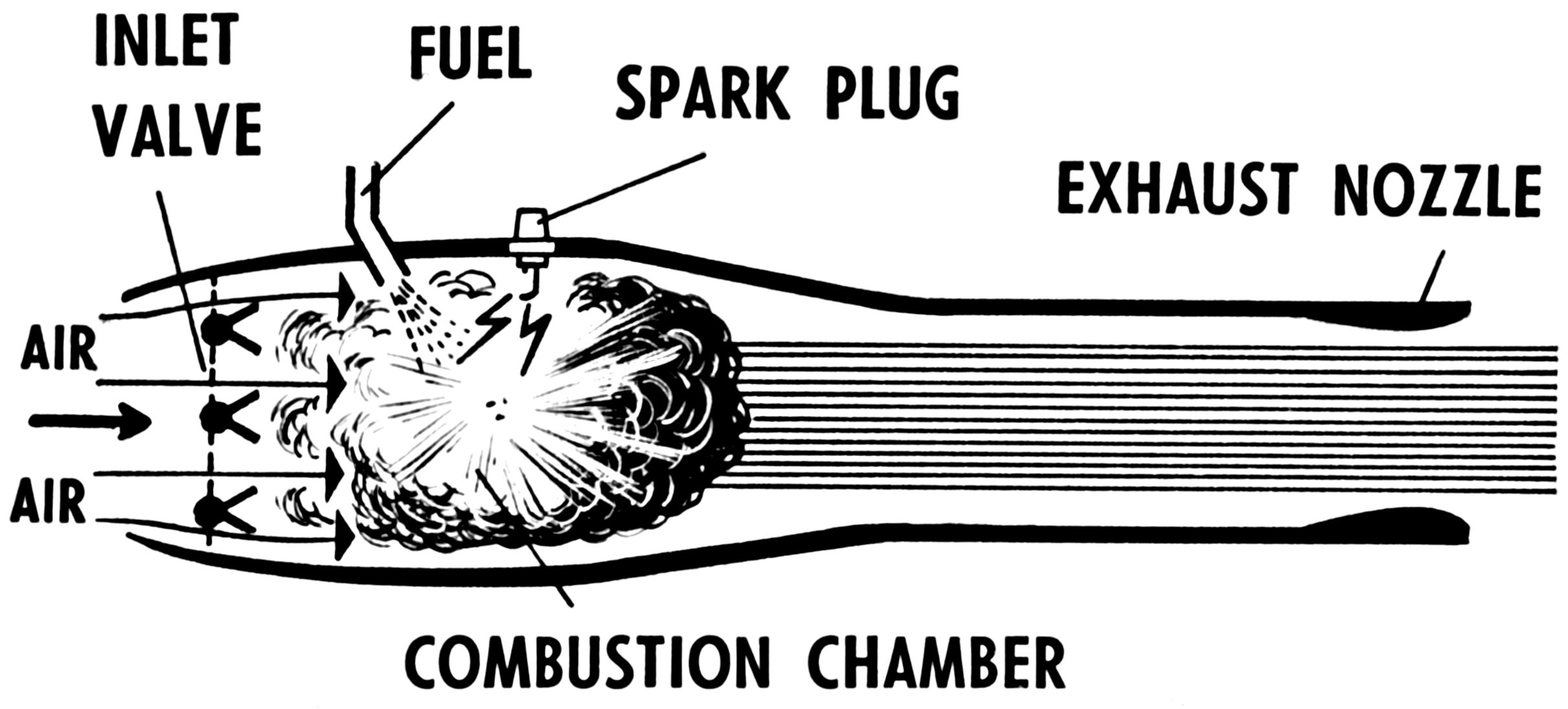
Diagram showing operation of a valved pulsejet

A model of simplicity and low cost, the engine was made from a sheet of mild steel rolled into a tube. At the front of the engine there was a spring flap-valve grid (shutters), a fuel inlet valve and an igniter. It could run on any grade of petroleum fuel and its shutter system was not expected to last longer than one flight, as it had an operational life of approximately one hour. The engine was a resonant jet which, contrary to popular legend, could operate while the V-1 was stationary on its launch ramp after reaching minimum operating temperature.

Ignition was initiated by an automotive-type spark plug located about 0.75 m (2 ft 6 in) behind the shutter system, electricity to the plug being supplied from a portable starting unit. Three air nozzles in the front of the pulse jet were connected to an external high pressure air source which was used to start the engine. Acetylene was used for starting, and very often a panel of wood or similar was held across the end of the tailpipe to prevent the fuel from diffusing and escaping before ignition was complete.

Once the engine had been started and the temperature rose to the minimum operating level, the external air hose and connectors were removed and the resonant design of the tailpipe kept the pulse jet firing. Each cycle or pulse of the engine began with the shutters open; fuel was injected behind them and ignited, and the resulting expansion of gases forced the shutters closed. As the pressure in the engine dropped following combustion, the shutters reopened and the cycle was repeated, roughly 45 to 55 times per second. The electrical ignition system was needed only to start the engine - a V-1 carried no coils or magnetos to power the spark plug once launched.

Since the engine was rather simple, low-grade gasoline could be used and a good amount of thrust — 2.7 kN (660 lb_{f}) — was produced, but it was inefficient, limiting the range of the V-1 to 240–400 km (150–250 mi) The resonant frequency of this combustion process was around 45 Hz, giving the V-1 its nicknames "buzz bomb" or "doodlebug", because of the sputtering sound it emitted.

== Operational history ==
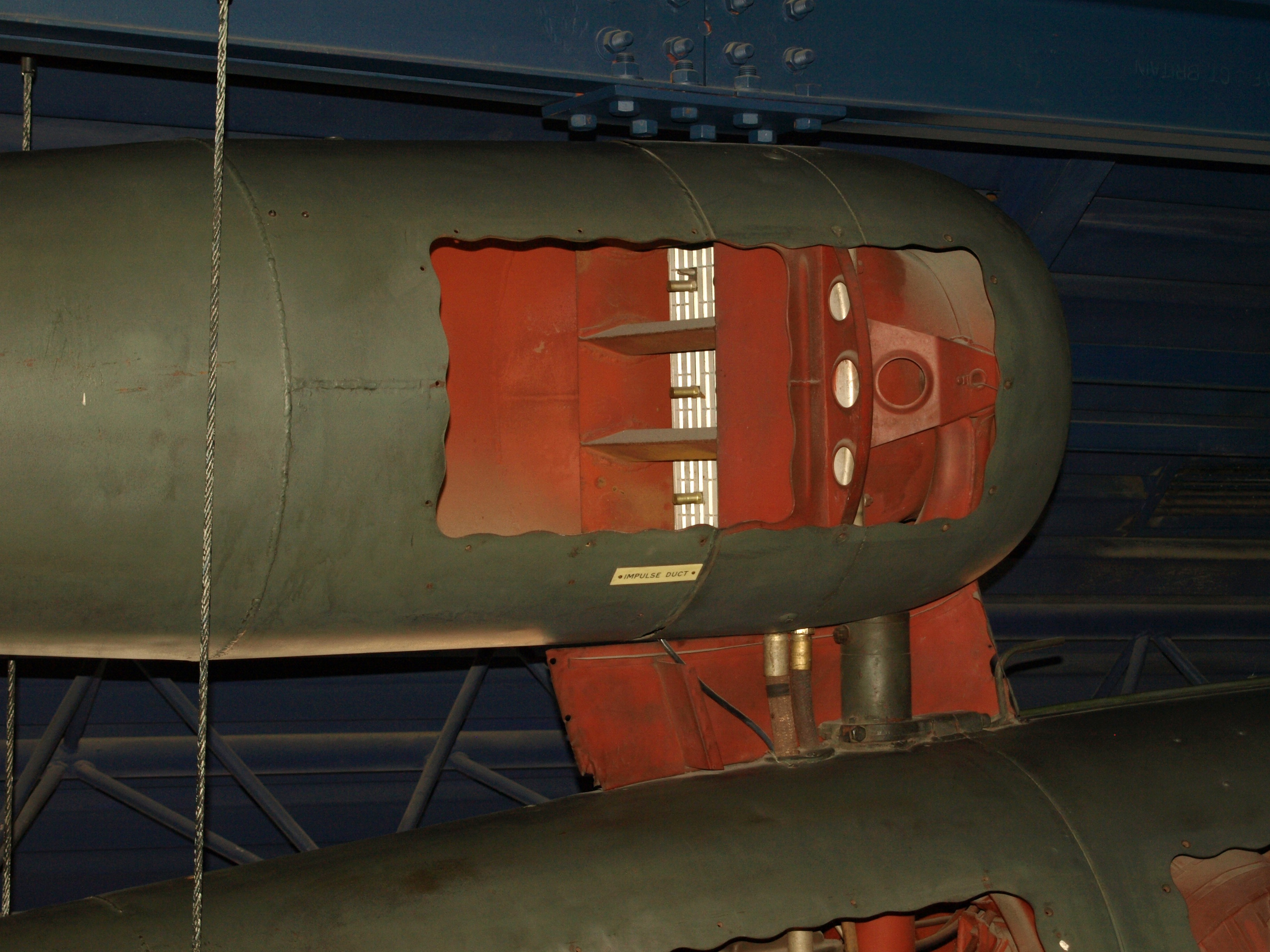
Sectioned AS 014 engine on display at the London Science Museum

The prototype engine was tested while slung below a Gotha Go 145 Luftwaffe training biplane marked D-IIWS in April 1941 and the first prototype V-1 flew on December 24 of 1942. The As 014, as well as the higher thrust As 044 pulsejet engine, was also under consideration as a power source for various last-ditch German fighters in the closing days of World War II. Production totaled 31,100 units.

After the Second World War the As 014 was reverse-engineered / copied for use by the United States as the Ford PJ31 on the Republic-Ford JB-2 (Fieseler Fi 103 copy), and by the Soviet Union as the Chelomey D-3 on the 10Kh (also a Fieseler Fi 103 copy).

== Applications ==
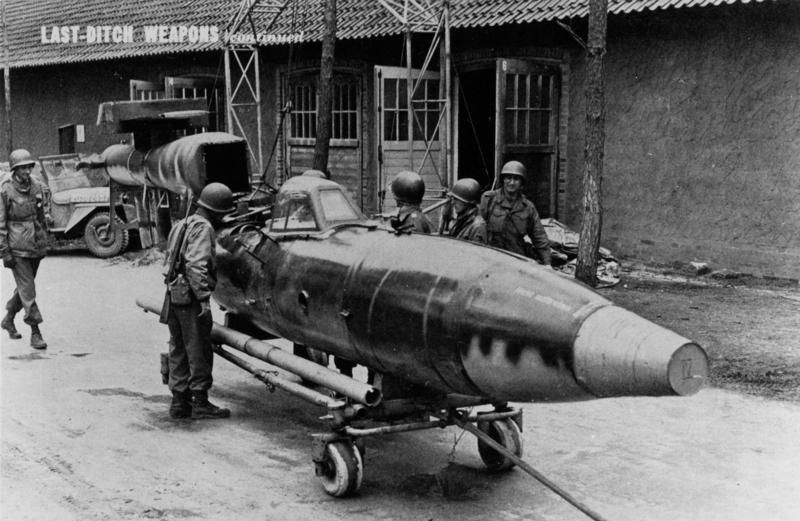
An Fi 103R "manned V-1" at Neu Tramm

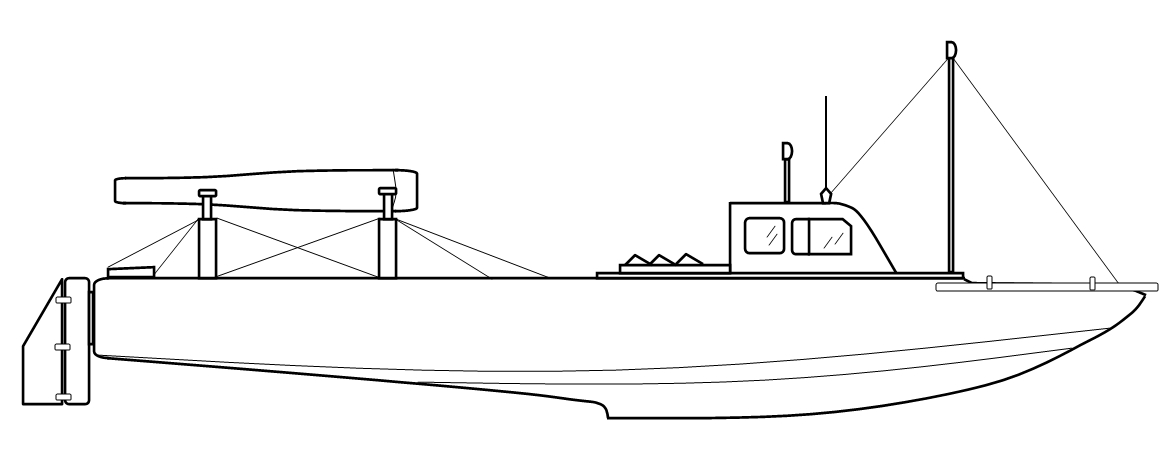
Sprengboot Tornado pulsejet powered "kamikaze" speedboat

- Blohm & Voss P 213
- Fieseler Fi 103 (V-1 flying bomb)
- Fieseler Fi 103R Reichenberg
- Junkers EF 126
- Messerschmitt Me 328

== Engines on display ==
The Planes of Fame Air Museum in Chino, California, constructed a reproduction of an As 014. The engine was demonstrated at the 2010 show.

The V-1 flying bomb held by the London Science Museum features a sectioned As 014 engine. Other museums displaying V-1s complete with their engines include the Imperial War Museum Duxford, Royal Air Force Museum Cosford, the Royal Air Force Museum London and the Military Aviation Museum. The Military Aviation Museum also features a fully functional As 014 on a test stand.

== Specifications (As 014) ==
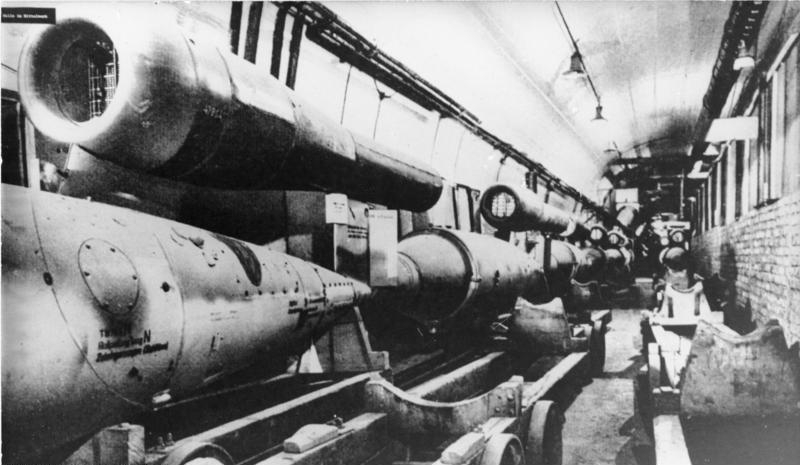
V-1 missiles on the Mittelbau-Dora production line with As 014 pulsejets installed

==== General characteristics ====
- Type: pulse jet
- Length: 144 in (3,658 mm)
- Diameter: 21.5 in (546 mm)
- Dry weight: 170 kg (375 lb)

==== Components ====
- Compressor: None, compression was achieved acoustically, with additional ram pressure when in flight.
- Fuel type: Gasoline

==== Performance ====
- Maximum thrust: 3.53 kN (794 lb_{f}) at 750 km/h (470 mph; 400 kn) at sea level.
- Thrust-to-weight ratio: 2.12

== See also ==
- List of aircraft engines
- Kawanishi Maru Ka10
- Republic-Ford JB-2

== Bibliography ==
- Gunston, Bill. World Encyclopedia of Aero Engines. Cambridge, England. Patrick Stephens Limited, 1989. ISBN 1-85260-163-9
- Jane's Fighting Aircraft of World War II. London. Studio Editions Ltd, 1989. ISBN 0-517-67964-7
