= Blohm & Voss P 213 =

Design for German jet fighter

P 213
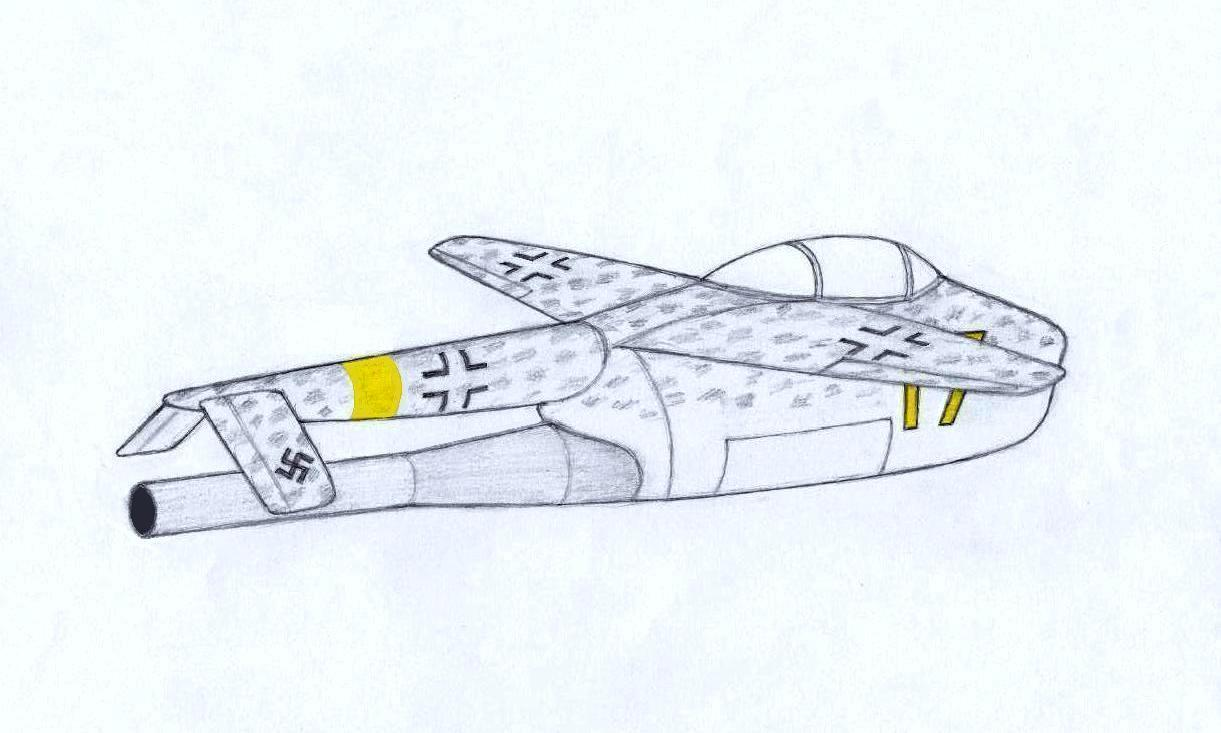

General information
- Type: "Miniature" Fighter
- Manufacturer: Blohm & Voss
- Primary user: Luftwaffe
- Number built: None completed

The Blohm & Voss P 213 was a submission to the Miniaturjäger (Miniature Fighter) programme of the Luftwaffe Emergency Fighter Program towards the end of the Second World War. The Miniaturjäger was to be powered by a pulse jet but the programme was scrapped in December 1944.

== History ==
In the latter part of 1944 the Luftwaffe High Command saw an urgent need to counter the devastating allied bombing raids. They conceived the idea of a Miniaturjäger, a miniature fighter, which could be cheaply and quickly manufactured in large numbers. Problems with the turbojet engines then appearing led to the adoption of the more primitive pulse jet. They approached Heinkel, Junkers and Blohm & Voss (B&V) in November to put forward designs using a strict minimum of materials, to be powered by one Argus As 014 pulse jet engine, similar to that used in the V-1 flying bomb. There would be no radio and only the most basic electrical equipment.

Heinkel proposed a He 162 air frame powered by a pulse jet and Junkers the Ju EF 126. The P 213 was B&V's proposal.

The Miniaturjäger programme was cancelled in December 1944 and none of the designs was built.

== Design ==
The P 213 was a conventional high-wing monoplane with unswept, tapered wings and an inverted v-tail. The pilot was positioned just in front of the wing, the jet intake in the nose and the Argus As 014 pulse jet beneath the aft fuselage.

However the structure was unconventional. Its fuselage skinning was to be two steel half-shells joined together, with the main structural loads and equipment carried by a fabricated steel core comprising the engine intake duct and main fuel tank. The wooden wing was a single fabrication screwed in place.

Armament was to be a single Mk 108 30 mm cannon installed above the jet intake.

== Replica ==
A non-flying replica is on display at the Military Aviation Museum in Virginia Beach, Virginia, US.

== Specifications ==
General characteristics

- Crew: one
- Length: 6.2 m (20 ft 4 in)
- Wingspan: 6 m (19 ft 8 in)
- Height: 2.28 m (7 ft 6 in)
- Wing area: 5 m^{2} (54 sq ft)
- Powerplant: 1 × Argus As 014 Pulse jet, 2.7 kN (610 lbf) thrust

Performance Armament

- Guns: 1 X 30mm MK 108 cannon

== See also ==
- List of German aircraft projects, 1939–45
- Messerschmitt Me 328
- Messerschmitt P.1079
