= Pulse Ejector Thrust Augmentor =

A Pulse Ejector Thrust Augmentor (PETA) is a proprietary pulse jet engine developed by Boeing. The Boeing PETA design embeds the pulse jet inside a thrust augmenting duct which entrains surrounding air into the exhaust stream. This entrained air improves thrust and cools the pulse jet. Boeing may use the PETA in its Light Aerial Multi-purpose Vehicle (LAMV) Future Combat System.

== Advantages ==
- The pulse jet engine's ability to be almost instantly throttled, with spoolup/spooldown time from minimum to max thrust and vice versa of around of 1–1,5 seconds, and startup and shutdown times of less than five seconds, would be advantageous in a vertical take-off and landing (VTOL) aircraft, where quick response to control input is useful.
- The ability to provide upward thrust and thus decouple vertical and axial movement of the aircraft.
- Valveless pulse jet engines are insensitive to sand and small debris.
- The engine's thrust augmenters can be incorporated as load bearing structures in the aircraft's superstructure, thus reducing overall weight.
- The design features no moving parts, which the creators claim increases reliability compared to conventional engines with moving parts.
- Multiple engines can be assembled into an array, allowing scalability to heavy-lifting applications.
- Arranging the engines in an array allows for distributed, highly redundant thrust, thus increasing reliability.

== Disadvantages ==
- Pulse jet engines are notorious for being loud. Owners of large engines (1800N thrust and above) have reported receiving noise complaints from people who were shielded from the "test site" by 7 km of hilly terrain covered by a dense forest.
