= 10Kh =

- Type: cruise missile
- Place of origin: USSR

Production history
- Designer: Vladimir N. Chelomey
- Designed: 1945
- Manufacturer: OKB-52
- Produced: 1945
- No. built: 300 (10Kh)
- Variants: 10Kh Izdeliye 30; 10KhN; 14Kh; 14KhK1; 15Kh; 16Kh; 17Kh; 18Kh; Gliding bomb

Specifications
- Engine: Chelomey D-3 ca 3.924 kN (882 lbf) thrust
- Propellant: Gasoline
- Operational range: 260 - 300 km
- Boost time: Solid fuel rockets (ramp launching)
- Launch platform: Petlyakov Pe-8; Tupolev Tu-2LL

10Kh was the designation for the initial series of Soviet Union pulse jet engine powered air-launched cruise missiles, reverse engineered from the Fieseler Fi 103 (V-1) flying bomb, developed in the 1950s by OKB-52 under the leadership of Vladimir Nikolaevič Čelomej (Chelomey) and cancelled in the same decade.

== History ==
Reports of the German V-1 flying bomb attacks on London prompted Stalin to initiate a programme to develop a Soviet equivalent, commencing in June 1944. Vladimir Chelomey, who had been working on pulse jet engines, was assigned to the project in October 1944 and given control of OKB-52. The programme was assisted by the partial recovery of a V-1 by Soviet forces at the Blizna test range in Poland. The initial V-1 copy was called 10Kh and later Izdeliye 10 ("Article 10"). Serial production was scheduled to commence in March 1945 with 100 per month, increasing to 450 per month later that year.

By the end of 1944 the development of the D-3 pulse engine that propelled the 10Kh was at the prototype stage and the first production 10Kh was ready on 5 February 1945. As no launching ramps had been constructed, the first test was an air launch from a Petlyakov Pe-8 heavy bomber on 20 March 1945, near Tashkent. By 25 July, 66 missiles had been launched, of which 44 transitioned to autonomous flight, 22 of these reaching the range target and 20 maintaining the required heading. A batch of improved 10Kh (Izdeliye 30) were constructed with wooden wings, and 73 more air launches were performed in December 1948. A ground-launched variant called the 10KhN was also tested in 1948, which used rocket-assisted take-off from a ramp.

The purpose of the first tests was to determine the feasibility of dropping the 10Kh missile from an aircraft in flight and ignite the pulse jet about 100 m (330 ft) below the mother-ship, but only six out of 22 missiles did so correctly. The second, more successful series of tests, achieved a success rate of 12 out of the 22 launched. The final tests were conducted to determine precision and effectiveness; six of 18 missiles launched impacted the target, and three detonated successfully, from four launched to determine effectiveness.

== Variants ==
10Kh
The initial production version of the V-1 reverse engineered look-alike, powered by a single Chelomey D-3, reverse engineered Argus As014 engine.
10Kh Izdeliye 30
An improved version with wooden wings.
10KhN
A ground-launched version using rocket-assisted take-off gear to boost the missile up a launch ramp.
14Kh
A further development with revised wings of several configurations and structural material, powered by a single Chelomey D-5 engine.
14KhK1
A sub-version of the Kh14 powered by a single Chelomey D-6.
15Kh
A ship launched version.
16Kh
Experimental missiles using Kh10 airframes with single Chelomey D-6 engines, later tested with two Chelomey D-3 engines mounted side by side on V-configured pylons on the aft fuselage and extended tailplanes with rectangular fins and rudders at the tailplane tips.
17Kh
A ship launched version.
18Kh
A further development of the 10Kh series of cruise missiles.
A gliding bomb
An un-powered gliding bomb was also derived from the 10Kh featuring a twin tail similar to the 16Kh in addition to a central fin, as well as a jettison-able undercarriage.
