= JB-4 =

American air-to-surface missile prototype

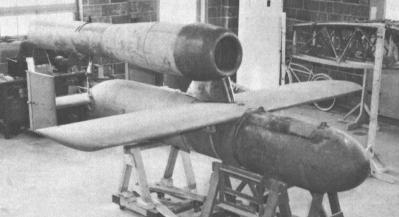
- Type: Air-to-surface missile
- Place of origin: United States

Service history
- In service: 1945
- Used by: United States Army Air Forces

Specifications
- Mass: 3,000 pounds (1,400 kg)
- Wingspan: 12 feet (3.7 m)
- Warhead: High explosive
- Warhead weight: 2,000 pounds (910 kg) bomb
- Engine: Ford PJ31 pulsejet 660 lb_{f} (2.9 kN)
- Operational range: 75 miles (121 km)
- Maximum speed: 445 mph (716 km/h)

The JB-4, also known as MX-607, was an early American air-to-surface missile developed by the United States Army Air Forces during World War II. Using television/radio-command guidance, the JB-4 reached the flight-testing stage before being cancelled at the end of the war.

== Design and development ==
Developed under the project code MX-607 at Wright Field in Ohio, the JB-4 was a modification of the GB-4 glide bomb, which had entered service with the U.S. Army Air Forces in 1944. Powered by a Ford PJ31 pulsejet engine, the JB-4 was intended to give an improved standoff range as opposed to its unpowered predecessor. In addition, the addition of an engine made the missile capable of being ground-launched as well. However the requirement to carry fuel for the engine meant that the size of the JB-4's warhead was limited to 750 pounds (340 kg), compared to the 2,000 pounds (910 kg) bomb that formed the core of the GB-4.

Utilising primarily plywood construction, the JB-4 utilised television/radio-command guidance, with an AN/AXT-2 transmitter broadcasting a television signal from a camera in the missile's nose to a remote operator. The operator, viewing the transmitted picture, would then transmit commands to the missile via radio, correcting the missile's course to ensure striking the target.

== Operational history ==
The JB-4 entered the flight testing stage in January 1945. The missile demonstrated the ability to cruise at over 400 miles per hour (640 km/h); however, the television-guidance concept suffered from the limitations of the technology of the time, the pictures being difficult to make out in anything except completely clear weather. The missile also suffered from reliability issues; these, combined with the end of World War II in August 1945, resulted in the termination of the project, with none of the JB-4s built seeing operational service.
