= Kawanishi Baika =

Japanese pulsejet suicide attack aircraft

Baika
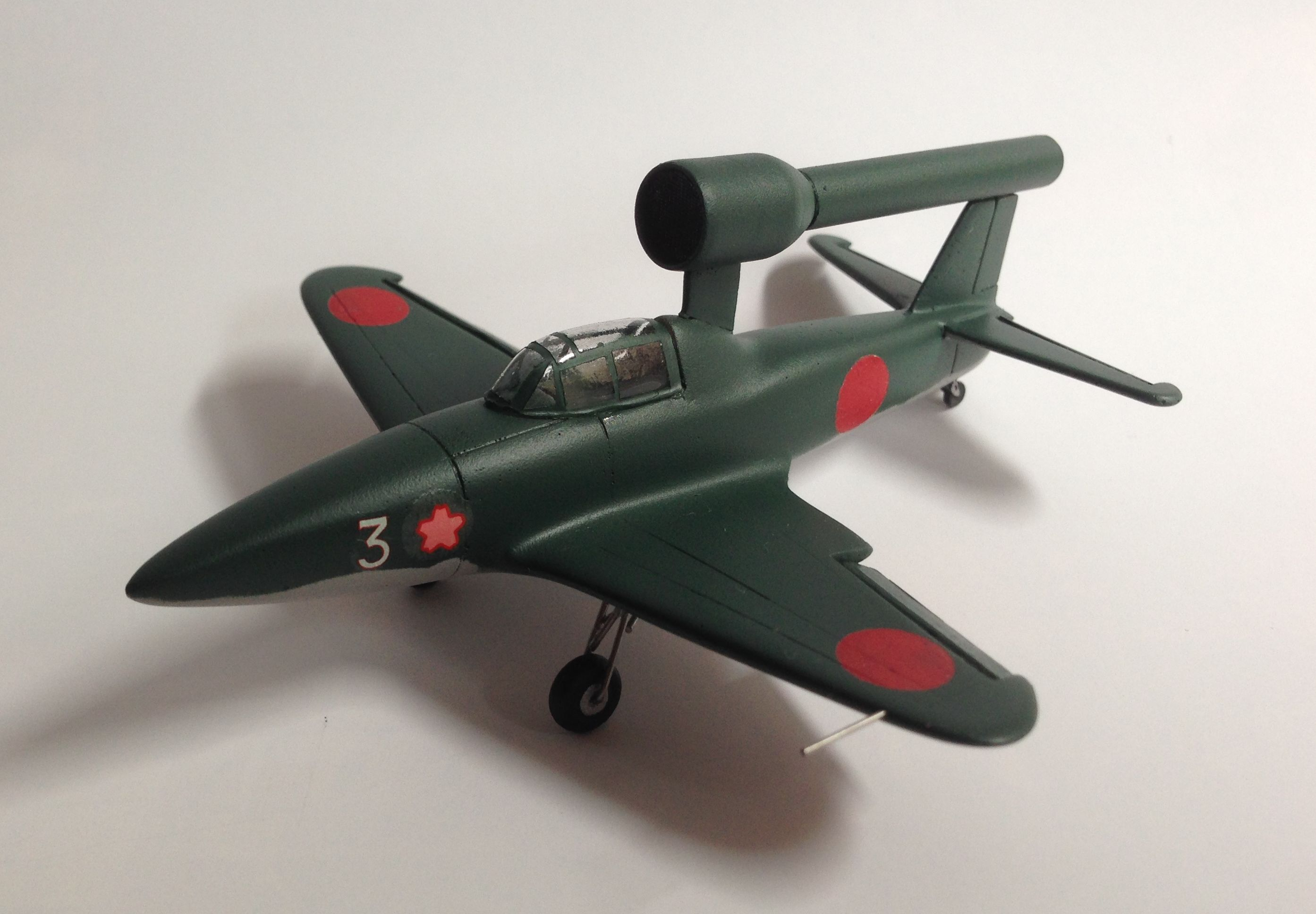

General information
- Type: Suicide attack aircraft
- National origin: Japan
- Manufacturer: Kawanishi Aircraft Company
- Status: Cancelled
- Primary user: IJN Air Service (Intended)
- Number built: 0

The Kawanishi Baika (梅花; "Ume Blossom") was a pulsejet-powered kamikaze aircraft under development towards the end of World War II. Designed by the Kawanishi Aircraft Company for the Imperial Japanese Navy (IJN), the conflict ended before any were built.

The impetus for developing the Baika emerged in 1943 as the strategic bombers of the Allies were proving to be increasingly effective to the extent that existing piston-engined fighter aircraft were viewed as inadequate for defence of the Japanese home islands. Following negotiations between Imperial Japan and Nazi Germany in late 1943, the former secured access to the latter's advanced aeronautical technologies, including the rocket motor, turbojet, and pulsejet propulsion, as well as technical data for platforms such as the Fieseler Fi 103R Reichenberg (the piloted version of the V1 flying bomb). In July 1944, Kawanishi was directed to work on an affordable successor to the rocket-powered Yokosuka MXY-7 Ohka and the turbojet-powered Nakajima Kikka that would be disposable enough for the kamikaze mission.

In early August, the company received a contract for a single prototype and ten trainer aircraft to be delivered only one month later. While intended to consume as few critical materials as possible and be suitable for unskilled labour to produce, the production documentation was never completed prior to the Surrender of Japan, at which point the project was put on immediate hold.

== History ==
By late 1943, Japanese officials had witnessed of the strategic bombing of Germany, and there was a growing suspicion that the Allies would soon attempt to bomb the Japanese home islands with their increasingly capable bombers, such as the Boeing B-29 Superfortress. Recognising that existing piston-engined fighter aircraft, such as the Mitsubishi A6M Zero and Mitsubishi J2M Raiden, would not be sufficiently capable against the looming bomber threat, there was an identified need for a better counter to this upcoming threat and motivated Japan to look towards the latest innovations of the Axis powers. Japanese military attachés had become aware of Germany's wartime aeronautical advances, such as the Messerschmitt Me 163 Komet rocket-powered interceptor aircraft, which motivated Japan to enter negotiations with Germany to secure their technical assistance. In late 1943, these talks led the granting of a licence to produce both the Me 163, its Walter HWK 509A rocket engine, and various other advances.

Accordingly, Nazi Germany would supply the Japanese with a great deal of technical data, including details of the Argus As 014 pulse jet engine and the Fieseler Fi 103R Reichenberg (the piloted version of the V1 flying bomb. Wartime U.S. intelligence reports stated that the Japanese were aware of the V-1 by October 1943; furthermore, one report stated that Japan received one example in November 1944. These reports also suggested that the Japanese were very interested in V-1 air-launching techniques. One U.S. Army Air Force document from 1946 shows the Baika as being a copy of the Reichenberg. The cargo manifest of the Japanese submarine I-29 lists a single V-1 fuselage as being included in a shipment of equipment. Some contemporary Japanese historians have debated on what, if any, data on the V-1 and Fi 103R that the Japanese had actually received and whether the Baika may simply have been an independent design. The only tangible outcome of the Axis cooperation, however, was the construction of prototypes of the Maru Ka10 pulse-jet engine which was to power the Baika.

On 2 July 1944, the Imperial Japanese Navy Aviation Bureau of the Ministry of the Navy directed the Kawanishi Aircraft Company to commence work on what would become the Kawanishi Baika. To support this endeavour, Kawanishi subsidised studies conducted by the Aeronautical Institute of the Tokyo Imperial University. According to the historian William Wolf, the Baika, being intended as a pulsejet-powered kamikaze aircraft, had been envisioned as the replacement for the rocket-powered Yokosuka MXY-7 Ohka as well as the turbojet-powered Nakajima Kikka. On 5 August 1945, at a conference held at the university attended by Kawanishi's senior designers and ranking officials of the IJN, the Baika was selected over a competing proposal, the Model 43B Okha, which had been dismissed as being too complex for mass production, especially due to its use of the Ishikawajima Ne-20 turbojet engine, which had been prioritised for the Kikka fighter. Consequently, Kawanishi received an order for a single prototype and ten twin-seat trainer aircraft, which were to be delivered during the following month. Furthermore, the finalised design was to be completed in October 1945 and mass production of the type to commence that same month.

The Baika visually resembled the Fi 103R Reichenberg. As a result of the Japan's declining military position and the Allied bombing campaign having targeted Japanese industrial locations, various materials were in short supply; accordingly, decision makers had stipulated that the Baika would be manufactured using the highest proportion of non-critical materials as was feasible to achieve. The design was also to be straightforward, to the extent that unskilled labourers would be able to produce most of the airframe at austere dispersed workshops if required. On 8 August 1945, a team of 60 designers at Kawanishi were scheduled to start on the production documentation for the Baika. This process was delayed, no more than ten engineers had arrived to work prior to 15 August 1945, the date on which the Surrender of Japan was issued. Consequently, the Baika project was put on hold before it ever progressed beyond the design stage or finalised the production specifics.

== Variants ==
Type I
Pulsejet intake located above and behind the cockpit, droppable landing gear. Intended for conventional take off on own power (possibly with the help of droppable rocket boosters).
Type II
Similar to Type I, but with pulsejet moved forwards, no landing gear. Intended for submarine launch.
Type III
Pulsejet mounted ventrally, no landing gear. Presumably, this version was intended to be air-launched by medium bombers such as the Mitsubishi G4M, Nakajima G8N or Yokosuka P1Y.

The currently accepted illustrations of the Baika come from the 1953 published book Koku Gijutsu No Zenbo in which Technical Commander Iwaya (the man who brought the Me 163 and BMW 003 info to Japan) provided drawings of all three versions of the Baika with all versions shown with tricycle landing gear in place.

== Specifications (Baika, as designed) ==
Data from Japanese Secret Projects

General characteristics

- Crew: 1
- Length: 6.97 m (22 ft 10 in)
- Wingspan: 6.58 m (21 ft 7 in)
- Height: 3.99 m (13 ft 1 in)
- Wing area: 7.58 m^{2} (81.6 sq ft)
- Empty weight: 750 kg (1,653 lb)
- Gross weight: 1,430 kg (3,153 lb)
- Fuel capacity: 600 L (132 imp gal)
- Powerplant: 1 × Maru Ka10 pulse-jet engine, 3.53 kN (794 lbf) thrust

Performance

- Maximum speed: 648 km/h (403 mph, 350 kn)
- Cruise speed: 485 km/h (301 mph, 262 kn)
- Range: 278 km (173 mi, 150 nmi)
- Service ceiling: 2,000 m (6,600 ft)
- Time to altitude: three minutes and 55 seconds to 2,000 m (6,600 ft)
- Wing loading: 188 kg/m^{2} (39 lb/sq ft)
- Thrust/weight: 0.2

Armament

- 1 × 250 kg (550 lb) warhead

== See also ==
Aircraft of comparable role, configuration, and era

- Fieseler Fi 103R Reichenberg
- Yokosuka MXY-7 Ohka

Related lists

- List of aircraft of Japan during World War II
- List of jet aircraft of World War II
- List of military aircraft of Japan
