= Kawanishi Maru Ka10 =

1940s Japanese pulsejet aircraft engine

Maru Ka10
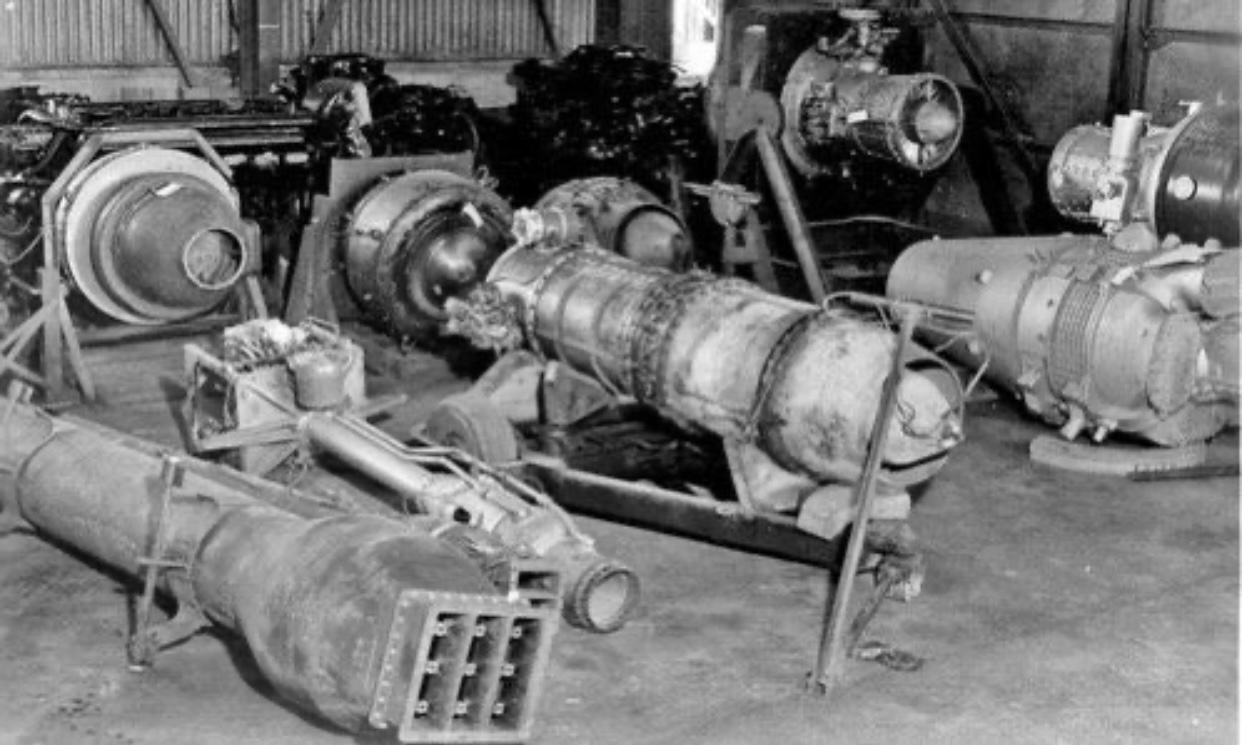
- Japanese World War II-era jet and rocket Engines, with the Maru Ka10 shown on the left
- Type: Pulsejet
- Manufacturer: Kawanishi Aircraft Company
- First run: 1944
- Major applications: Kawanishi Baika (Planned)
- Developed from: Argus As 014

The Kawanishi Maru Ka10 was a World War II Japanese pulsejet engine based on the German Argus As 014 (as used in the V-1 flying bomb). The Ka10’s only intended application was the Kawanishi Baika.

== Design and development ==
Japanese scientists received drawings of the Argus 014 PulseJet from the I-8 submarine’s technology exchange mission to German-occupied France in 1943. A Japanese version of the Argus 014, the Maru Ka10, was designed by Professors Ichiro Tami and Taichiro Ogawa of the Aeronautical Institute of Tokyo Imperial University during 1944.

Initial tests of the Ka10 were performed using benzole as a fuel however the engine was designed to run on various fuels including heavy kerosene and pine oil. The use of substitute fuels avoided the need to use aviation gasoline which was in short supply by 1944. The Ka10 was far less complex than contemporary turbojet or piston engines and the intention was for the pulsejets to be built by unskilled or semi-skilled laborers in small workshops. During the design stage concerns were expressed due to the relatively short engine lifespan and the high noise of the pulsejet engine which could give advance warning of an aircraft’s approach.

The Ka10's intended application was the Kawanishi Baika, a small piloted “special attack aircraft” designed to ram an explosive warhead into enemy ships. The Kawanishi Baika was similar in concept to the pulsejet driven German Fieseler Fi 103R Reichenberg. The war ended before the Baika could be put into production.

== Specifications ==
Data from Miranda

==== General characteristics ====
- Type: Pulsejet
- Length: 3,750 mm (148 in)
- Diameter: 550 mm (22 in)
- Dry weight: 153 kg (337 lb)

==== Components ====
- Compressor: Constant volume explosion chamber
- Fuel type: Benzole, kerosene, turpentine, pine oil and various low quality hydrocarbon fuels

==== Performance ====
- Maximum thrust: 360 kg (794 lb) at 740 km/h (460 mph; 400 kn) at sea level.
- Thrust-to-weight ratio: 2.35
