= Messerschmitt Me 328 =

German parasite fighter prototypes

Me 328
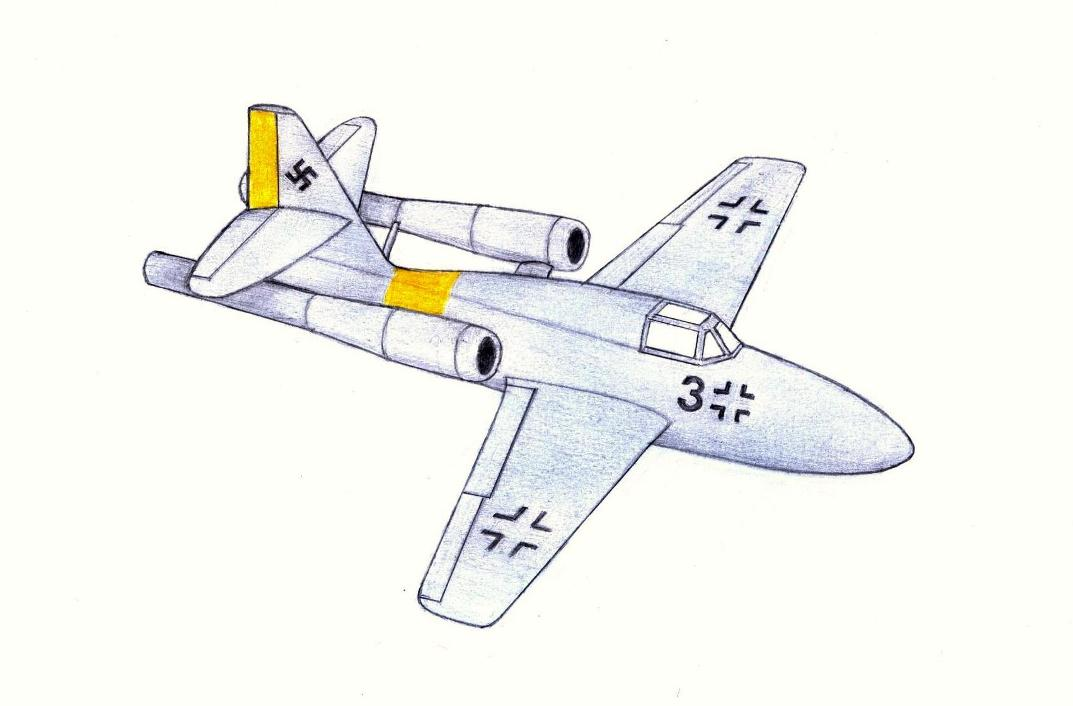
- Messerschmitt Me 328 B

General information
- Type: Pulse-jet powered fighter
- National origin: Nazi Germany
- Manufacturer: Messerschmitt AG
- Status: prototype only
- Number built: 4 (+1 static test airframe)

History
- First flight: August 3, 1942

The Messerschmitt Me 328 was a prototype pulsejet-powered fighter aircraft designed and produced by the German aircraft manufacturer Messerschmitt AG.

The Me 328 arose out of design studies for the P.1079 in 1941, having been envisioned as a parasite aircraft that would protect Luftwaffe bomber formations from Allied fighter aircraft. Being largely composed of wood, the Me 328 was forecast to be several times cheaper than the cost of traditional German fighter aircraft, such as the Focke-Wulf Fw 190 or Bf 109. It was proposed to use various forms of propulsion, including a single Jumo 004 turbojet engine, either two or four Argus As 014 pulsejets (as used on the V-1 flying bomb), and even as an unpowered glider. The Deutsche Forschungsanstalt für Segelflug (DFS - "German Research Institute for Sailplane Flight") was also involved in its development.

Making its maiden flight in August 1942, the compact fighter was powered by a pair of As 014 pulsejets. However, these engines were fairly unsuitable, producing excessive resonance, asymmetry, and noise; accordingly, the manned flight programme was suspended after only a few test flights. During its protracted development, a wide variety of other roles were explored for the Me 328; at Adolf Hitler's direction, resources were invested into its potential use as a bomber. As the conflict turned increasingly in favour of the Allies, the Me 328 project was resurrected for consideration as a Selbstopfer (suicide weapon) aircraft, but was deemed to be unsuitable even for this purpose. None were ever used in an operational capacity.

== History ==
=== Design ===
Work on what would become the Me 328 can be traced back to early 1941 and an approach by the German engine manufacturer Argus Motoren to the aircraft company Messerschmitt AG to inform the latter of its recent advances with pulsejet technology. While the projected 500 kg (1,100 lb) of thrust output was less than the 600 kg (1,300 lb) output projected for early turbojet engines, it was a far lighter engine at 80 kg (180 lb) verses 600 kg (1,300 lb). Messerschmitt was suitably impressed, so that efforts to incorporate the Argus As 014 pulsejet engine into its aircraft designs was promptly initiated; early design work was centered around applying it to the Me 262, which would become the world's first production jet fighter. By May 1941, no less than 21 designs had been drafted by the company's project office, which had internally designated them as P.1079.

A twin-engine arrangement was selected for its greater flight performance, the engine configuration used also permitted the propulsion units to be easily interchanged. Each pulsejet could be individually controlled by the pilot, including a quick-stop function; gauges indicating fuel-flow, fuel capacity, and pressure were present alongside controls for power distribution and safety alongside standard apparatus. The cockpit was relatively primitive, although provisions had been made for its replacement by a more well equipped pressurised counterpart without substantial changes to the rest of the aircraft if required. Aviation author Dan Sharp observed that much of the aircraft's design appeared to be shaped as to permit as rapid an entry into service as possible as well as to minimise costs. The aircraft's construction was to be mainly of wood. A gently swept wing was applied to the aircraft for its favourable high-speed qualities. A relatively simplistic dive brake could also be incorporated. However, even at this stage, the design team expressed their uncertainty over the aircraft's stability.

As early as December 1941, discussions with the Reichsluftfahrtministerium (RLM) (the German Reich Aviation Ministry) considered the P.1079 to be primarily as a fighter aircraft. In such a capacity, it was intended to be deployed as a cost-effective and simplistic escort fighter, to either be towed aloft by a Heinkel He 177 heavy bomber or Junkers Ju 388 using a semi-rigid bar (the Deichselschlepp, which was also considered for towing winged auxiliary fuel tanks), or carried on a Me 264 in a Mistel type fashion. Three versions of the aircraft were initially proposed: an unpowered glider, a version powered by Argus As 014 pulsejets, and a version powered by a single Jumo 004 turbojet engine. Messerschmitt believed that the type would be capable of performing in several roles ranging from a fighter to aerial reconnaissance, bomber, and interceptor aircraft.

During February 1942, the project was transferred to the Deutsche Forschungsanstalt für Segelflug (DFS - "German Research Institute for Sailplane Flight") for further development. One month later, the Me 328 designation was attached to the aircraft for the first time; that same month, work on producing an initial three prototypes commenced. Shortly thereafter, two versions of the aircraft were proposed, the Me 328A (fighter) and the Me 328B (bomber); it was estimated that four Me 328s could be built for the cost of a Focke-Wulf Fw 190 or Bf 109 fighter. It was also suggested at one point that it be towed behind the Me 264 heavy bomber for protection. It was envisioned that costs and production difficulties could both be reduced by incorporating as many components as possible from the in-production Me 262 and Me 209 aircraft.

=== Prototypes ===
Test pilot Hanna Reitsch carried out a test programme on the two prototypes of the glider version, releasing from its carrier aircraft at altitudes of 3,000–6,000 m (10,000–20,000 ft). Ground launches, using both cable-type catapults and rocket-assisted carriages on rails, were successfully conducted. Even with a reduced wingspan, the aircraft demonstrated a very satisfactory performance, and it was planned to build up to 1,000 for use as disposable bombers to be flown by volunteers from 5/KG200, the so-called Leonidas Squadron.

Seven prototypes, each powered by a pair of Argus As 014 pulsejets (as used on the V-1 flying bomb), were built by glider manufacturer Jacobs-Schweyer of Darmstadt. It was intended for use as a fighter aircraft, to be armed with two 20 mm MG 151/20 cannons. However, during static testing it soon became apparent that it suffered the same problems which were to plague the early development of the V-1 flying bomb - namely, excessive vibration. The first prototype was lost during flight testing in September 1942 during a dive. The engine problems were such that officials came to believe that the project would be difficult to bring to a successful conclusion, and the manned flight programme was suspended in mid-1944, after only a few test flights had been made. Sharp notes a major factor in the Me 328's suspension was the superior results from turbojet development, making aircraft that harness them, such as the Me 262, more attractive prospects.

Many of the problems with the aircraft were due to its engines - pulsejet propulsion did not operate effectively at high to medium altitudes (where the majority of combat was anticipated to take place) due to the lower air pressure. Furthermore, these engines also generated a huge amount of noise, allowing observers to hear the aircraft from several miles away, which was not a desirable quality. The excessive vibration produced by the engine would be compounded by the fact that, in a twin-engined configuration, the two pulsejets would run at individual and unique thrust cycles, producing oscillations that would inherently cause instability due to asymmetry as well as resonance. These vibrations were not only harmful to the pilot's health, but also threatened the aircraft's structural integrity. During September 1943, Willy Messerschmitt and Rudolf Seitz discussed switching the Me 328 to turbojet propulsion. The proposal to fit the Me 328 with a Jumo 004 turbojet was designated as the Me 328C.

Despite this, development work continued, incorporating design advances from other Messerschmitt programmes, such as the P.1092 single-jet fighter design proposals. One of the projected Me 328 models produced around this timeframe increased the number of Argus pulsejets to four, the additional pair of engines being mounted below the wings in addition to the original pair positioned on pylons above the rear fuselage. Bomber versions of both types were proposed, and work continued on them at the insistence of Adolf Hitler long after the point when anything other than token use could have been made of them.

During 1944, moves were made to revive the Me 328 again, this time as a piloted flying bomb based on the Me 328B, fitted with a 900 kg (2,000 lb) bomb. According to Sharp, Reitsch had advocated for the use of Me 328 project as a suicide weapon, however, the aircraft was not developed with any such use being intended. However, work was dropped in favour of the Fieseler Fi 103R (Reichenberg).

=== Proposed roles ===
A wide variety of roles were suggested for the aircraft, ranging from a point-defence interceptor, to a version with folding wings and twin pulsejets to be launched from a catapult on a U-boat, to a ground-attack aircraft. It was even believed that the Me 328 could be equipped to undertake aerial refueling. Various modifications to the prototypes were made to evaluate their suitability for these missions, and different engine configurations were tested. Despite all this, the vibration problem simply could not be overcome and the program was abandoned in early 1944, even as production facilities were being readied to construct the aircraft at the Jacobs Schweyer sailplane factory in Darmstadt.

According to the historian Thomas Powers, German officials explored the concept of using the Me 328 as a parasite bomber within the Amerika Bomber program. In this role, a single Me 328 was to be carried by or towed behind either an Me 264 or a Ju 390 to attack New York City. Plans for this tactic — first proposed as much as nine months before Heinkel's trans-Atlantic Amerika Bomber design competitor received its own RLM designation — were hatched from a meeting between Generalfeldmarschall Erhard Milch and Generalmajor Eccard Freiherr von Gablenz at Berlin on 12 May 1942. After release, the Me 328 pilot would release a bomb over Manhattan and then ditch at sea near a U-boat. The idea was dropped in August 1942.

== Variants ==
Me 328 V1 to V10
Prototypes for the planned Me 328A, with first three built by DFS and Me 328 V1 and V2 first flown in unpowered form and later fitted with Argus As 014 pulsejets. Carried piggy-back on a Dornier Do 217 and Heinkel He 111 and released for flight test, at times by Hanna Reitsch.
Me 328B V1 to V20
Twenty prototypes of the Me 328B ordered built Jacobs-Schweyer Flugzeugbau G.m.b.H. (Hans Jacob). Only the Me 328B V1 was completed, while Me 328B V2 was incomplete before war's end.
Me 328A
The proposed parasite fighter intended for carriage by the Amerikabomber,
Me 328B
The proposed bomber variant. 280 production vehicles on order but not built.
Me 328C
Jumo 004 powered fighter derivative proposed in 1943.

== Specifications (Me 328B) ==
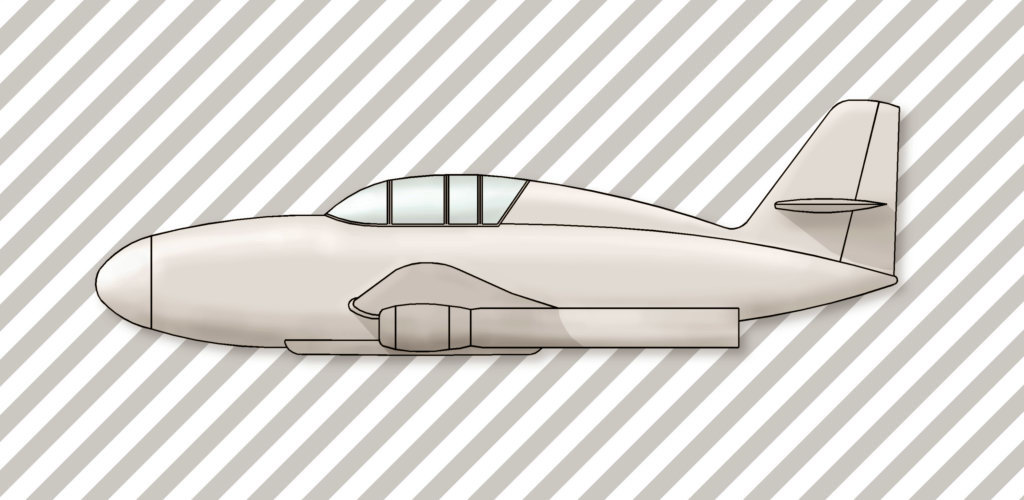

Data from Die Deutsche Luftruestung 1933–1945 - Vol.3 - Flugzeugtypen Henschel-Messerschmitt

General characteristics

- Crew: 1
- Length: 7.17 m (23 ft 6 in)
- Wingspan: 6.9 m (22 ft 8 in)
- Height: 1.6 m (5 ft 3 in)
- Wing area: 8.5 m^{2} (91 sq ft)
- Empty weight: 1,600 kg (3,527 lb)
- Gross weight: 4,500 kg (9,921 lb)
- Powerplant: 2 × Argus As 014 pulse-jet, 2.9 kN (660 lbf) thrust each - static thrust: 2.2 kN (500 lbf); max thrust: 3.6 kN (800 lbf)

Performance

- Maximum speed: 805 km/h (500 mph, 435 kn)
- Range: 485 km (301 mi, 262 nmi)

Armament
500 kg (1,100 lb) explosive warhead

== Replica ==
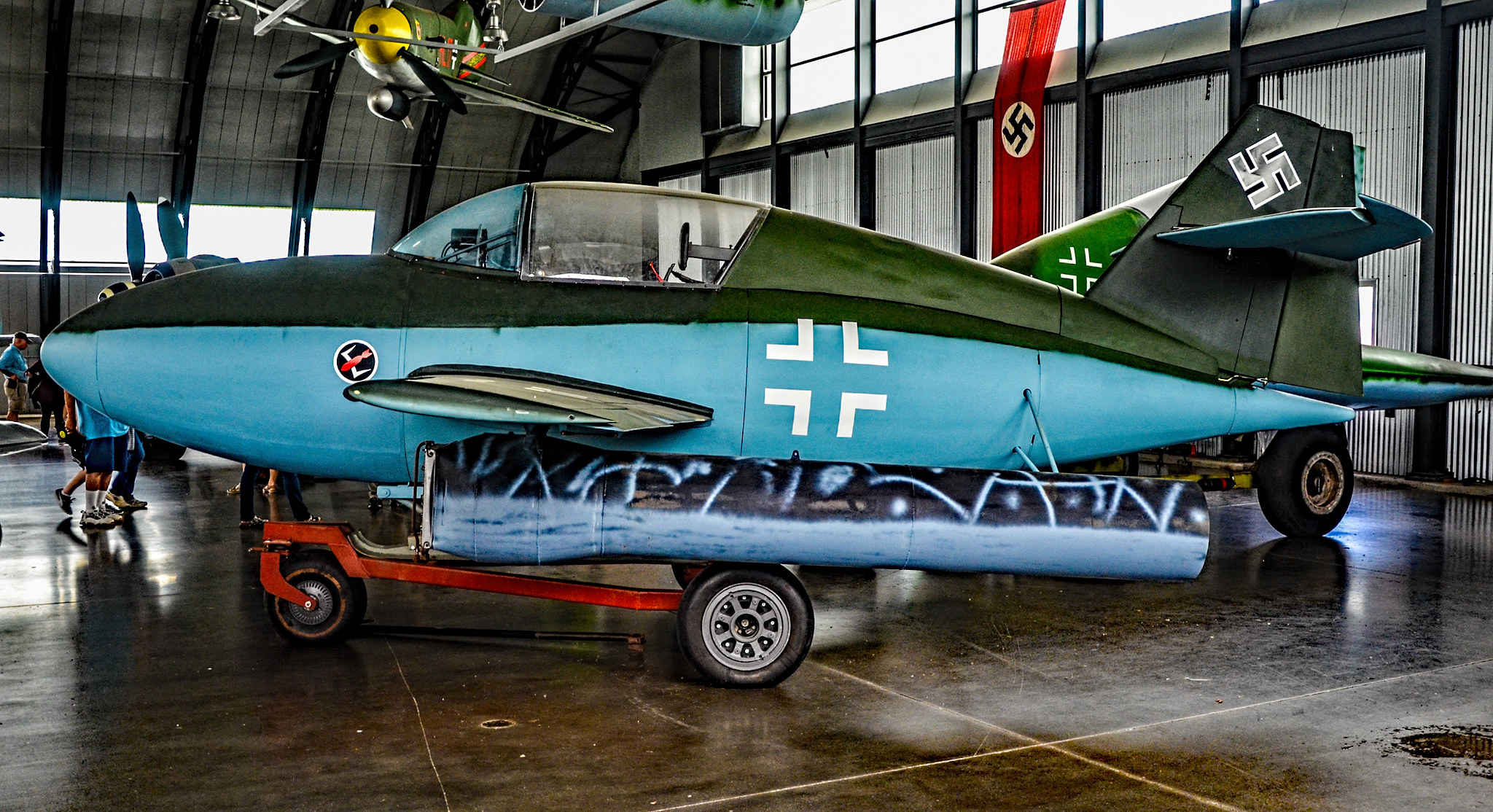
Replica at the Military Aviation Museum in Virginia Beach, Virginia

One replica is on display at the Military Aviation Museum in Virginia Beach, Virginia.

== See also ==
- Emergency Fighter Program
- Blohm & Voss P 213
- Messerschmitt P.1079
- Junkers EF 126
