= Messerschmitt P.1079 =

German fighter project

Me P.1079
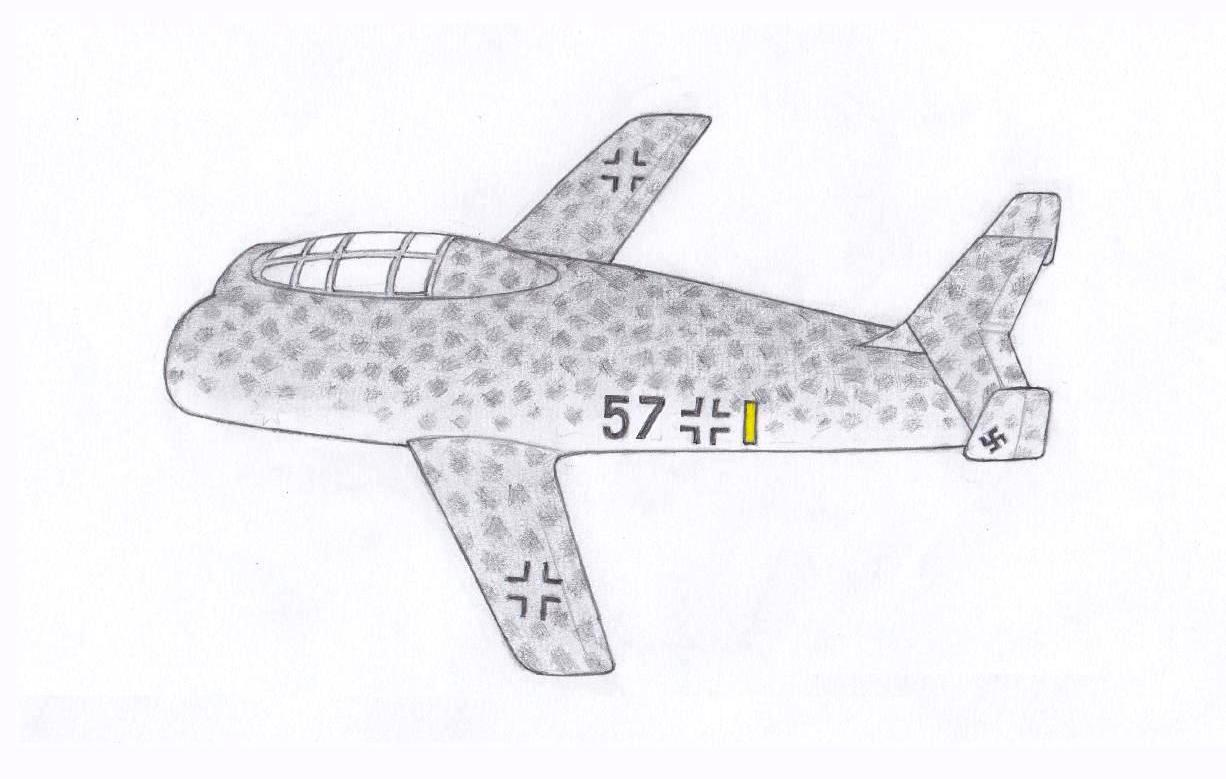
- Me P.1079 16

General information
- Type: Fighter / interceptor
- Designer: Messerschmitt
- Status: project only
- Primary user: Luftwaffe

History
- Developed into: Messerschmitt Me 328

The Messerschmitt P.1079 was a series of pulsejet-powered Messerschmitt fighter projects during the Second World War. The P.1079 aircraft designs were to be powered by pulse jets, the same engines used in the V-1 flying bomb.

== History ==
In May 1941, Messerschmitt began work on a series of pulsejet-powered fighter designs under the designation P.1079 after it was obvious that the BMW turbojets planned for the Me 262 were not yet available and pulsejets were simpler and cheaper to build

The Argus pulsejets proved themselves unsuitable for crewed aircraft that would have to take off unassisted, for they did not produce enough power at low speeds for takeoff. Since additional launch schemes would have to be added to the project, such as towplanes, aircraft catapults or rocket boosters, the goal of the program would be defeated and expenses would be far higher than projected.

A further variant, the Me P.1079 18 Schwalbe, appears in some publications. But this "experimental aircraft" is a widely publicized hoax, not a real Messerschmitt project.

== Variants ==
All of the Me P.1079 variants were small planes and none of them would have been able to take off unassisted. All projected aircraft were provided with retractable skids for landing.

=== Me P.1079/1 ===
1941 project powered by a single pulsejet placed above the fuselage. The wings were short and swept back.

=== Me P.1079/2 ===
Powered by a single Argus-Schmidt SR 500 pulsejet. It had the cockpit at the front end of the long fuselage and short swept wings. The narrow air intake was located in a ventral position below the cockpit.

=== Me P.1079/10c ===
Powered by a single SR 500 pulsejet, half of which protruded from the tail end. The air intake was located behind the cockpit on top of the fuselage. This was one of the least sophisticated designs.

Data from Jean-Denis G.G. Lepage

General characteristics

- Crew: one
- Length: 7.2 m (23 ft 7 in)
- Wingspan: 5 m (16 ft 5 in)
- Powerplant: 1 × Argus-Schmidt SR 500 pulsejet engine

Performance

- Thrust/weight: 200 kg

Armament

- Guns: 2 MG 131

=== Me P.1079/13b ===
Powered by two SR pulsejets placed on both sides of the fuselage. It had twin vertical tailfins.

Data from Jean-Denis G.G. Lepage

General characteristics

- Crew: one
- Powerplant: 2 × Argus-Schmidt SR 500 pulsejet engines

Performance

- Thrust/weight: 400 kg

=== Me P.1079/15 ===
Asymmetric design, powered by a single pulsejet, having a broad, flat-looking fuselage with the cockpit on the right side and the pulsejet on the left.

=== Me P.1079/16 ===
Another asymmetrical small plane powered by a single pulsejet. Except for the twin vertical tailfins and the air intake design it was similar to the Me P.1079 15 with a broad flat body having the cockpit on the right and the pulsejet on the left.

Data from Jean-Denis G.G. Lepage

General characteristics

- Crew: one
- Powerplant: 1 × Schmidt pulsejet engine

Performance

- Thrust/weight: 200 kg

Armament

- Guns: two MG 151 20 mm cannon

== See also ==
- V-1 flying bomb
- Blohm & Voss P 213
- Messerschmitt Me 328
- Emergency Fighter Program
- List of German aircraft projects, 1939–45
