= XA-5 Top Sergeant =

American helicopter

The XA-5 Top Sergeant was a helicopter developed by American Helicopter in the late 1940s.

== Design ==
The XA-5 had an open cockpit and the lower fuselage and undercarriage of a Sikorsky R-6 with an open rear boom and small rudder. The two rotor blades had two tip-mounted pulsejet engines driven by a fuselage-mounted compressor.

== Development ==
The XA-5 first flew in January 1949.
