= Paul Schmidt (inventor) =

German aerospace engineer

- Born: 26 March 1898; Hagen, North Rhine-Westphalia, Germany
- Died: 18 October 1976 (aged 78); Munich, Bavaria, Germany
- Occupations: Engineer, inventor

Paul Schmidt (26 March 1898 – 18 October 1976) was a German aerospace engineer and inventor based in Munich, mainly known for his contribution to the development of the pulsejet.

== Life ==
Schmidt was born on 26 March 1898 in Hagen, Westphalia.

His early work involved efforts to improve the performance and efficiency of aircraft power plants. In 1928 he decided the most promising technology was intermittent thrust generation. With meagre resources, he worked on developing pulse engines. German ministry officials visited him in the early 1930s to make an assessment of his work.

He initially started pushing the concept of the pulse engine in 1931. Patent DE523655 contained the first sketch of an impulsive duct. In the mid 1930s, the Luftwaffe was interested in applying Schmidt's work . His development of the Pulse Engine was referred to as the Schmidtrohr (Schmidttube) and he obtained both German and British patents for it. He used the term "pulsating incineration" in reference to the re-ignition principles.

While his early pulse engines performed poorly, he lost control of the project, though still remained involved. However, the project got more attention and government funding, following the start of the war. The Luftwaffe supported the project, and Schmidt's pulse engine, with extra development, was used to power the V-1 flying bomb, the first cruise missile. The engine was based on a 3.6 metre long tube resonator. It had a valve matrix at its entrance, and a laval nozzle at its exit, and used it for periodic re-ignition (at about 50 Hz).

Schmidt died on 18 October 1976 in Munich.
