= Leonidas Squadron =

German World War 2 squadron, issued Reichenberg flying bombs

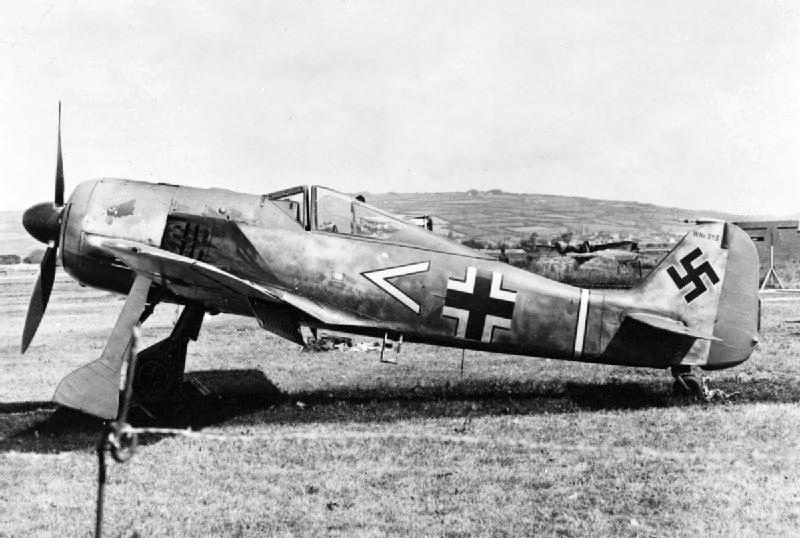
Focke-Wulf Fw 190s that were used for "total operations"

The Leonidas Squadron, formally known as "5th Staffel of Kampfgeschwader 200", was a unit which was originally formed to fly the Fieseler Fi 103R Reichenberg, a manned version of the V-1 flying bomb, in attacks in which the pilot was likely to be killed, or at best to parachute down at the attack site. The Reichenberg was never used in combat because Werner Baumbach, the commander of KG 200, and his superiors considered it an unnecessary waste of life and resources. The Mistel composite aircraft was preferred.

== History ==
The establishment of a suicide squadron (staffel) was originally proposed by Otto Skorzeny and Hajo Herrmann. The proposal was supported by test pilot Hanna Reitsch. The idea proposed was that Germany would use volunteers as suicide pilots in order to overcome the Allies' numerical advantages with their fanatic spirit. The idea had roots in German mythology that was glorified by Nazi propaganda. Hitler was reluctant, but eventually agreed to Reitsch's request to establish and train a suicide attack air unit, with the condition that it would not be operated in combat without his approval. The new unit, nicknamed the "Leonidas Squadron", became part of KG 200. It was named after Leonidas I, king of Sparta, who in 480 BC, after realizing that he was being flanked, dismissed the bulk of the Greek army he commanded and resisted the invading Persian army at the Battle of Thermopylae with 1,400 warriors who fought to the last man against 100,000 Persians.

Reitsch's plan was to attack Allied invasion shipping using the Messerschmitt Me 328 as a suicide weapon which would dive into the sea underneath ships and explode a 900-kilogram (2,000 lb) bomb. Heinrich Himmler approved the idea, and suggested using convicted criminals as pilots. The Luftwaffe's High Command was unenthusiastic; Erhard Milch turned the plan down as impractical, and Hermann Göring showed little interest. Adolf Hitler was against the idea of self-sacrifice, believing that it was not in keeping with the German character, and furthermore did not see the war situation as being bad enough to require such extreme measures. Despite this, he allowed Reitsch to proceed with the project after she showed the plan to him in February 1944. Günther Korten, the Luftwaffe's head of general staff, gave the matter to the commander of KG 200 to deal with.

Over 70 volunteers, mostly young recruits, came forward; they were required to sign a declaration which said, "I hereby voluntarily apply to be enrolled in the suicide group as part of a human glider-bomb. I fully understand that employment in this capacity will entail my own death."

Problems were experienced in converting the Me 328, and the decision was taken to use instead a manned version of the V-1 flying bomb, the Fieseler Fi 103R; however, it never entered operation.

On 9 June 1944, Karl Koller announced that a group of KG 200 pilots equipped with special Focke-Wulf Fw 190s was ready for "total operations". Each aircraft carried a heavy bomb, the weight of which meant that the machines could not carry enough fuel for a return flight. Thus the pilots were only trained using the aircraft as gliders. This project ultimately came to nothing, and Werner Baumbach, by then the commander of KG 200, persuaded his friend Albert Speer that it would be more productive to use the men against Russian power stations rather than against the Allied invasion fleet; Speer passed this on to Hitler.

== Oder bridge attack missions, April 1945 ==
During the Battle for Berlin, the Luftwaffe flew "self-sacrifice missions" (Selbstopfereinsätze) against Soviet-held bridges over the Oder River. These 'total missions' were flown by pilots of the Leonidas Squadron under the command of Lieutenant Colonel Heiner Lange from 17 April until 20 April 1945, using any aircraft that were available. The Luftwaffe claimed that the squadron destroyed seventeen bridges. However, the military historian Antony Beevor, writing about the incident, claims that this was exaggerated and that only the railway bridge at Küstrin was definitely destroyed. Beevor comments that "thirty-five pilots and aircraft was a high price to pay for such a limited and temporary success". The missions were called off when the Soviet ground forces reached the vicinity of the squadron's airbase at Jüterbog and were in a position to overrun it.

== See also ==
- Kamikaze
- Sonderkommando Elbe
- Suicide bombings
