= Fieseler Fi 103R Reichenberg =

German World War II attack aircraft

Fi 103R Reichenberg
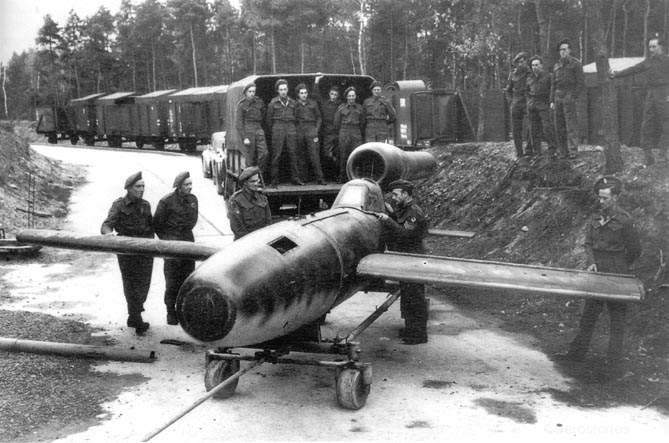
- Fi 103R Reichenberg (without warhead) captured by British troops in 1945

General information
- Type: Manned missile
- National origin: Nazi Germany
- Manufacturer: Fieseler
- Primary user: Luftwaffe
- Number built: c. 175

History
- Manufactured: October 1944
- First flight: September 1944
- Developed from: Fieseler Fi 103 (V-1 flying bomb)

The Fieseler Fi 103R, code-named Reichenberg, was a German manned version of the V-1 flying bomb (more correctly known as the Fieseler Fi 103). It was developed towards the end of the Second World War and was intended to be used as a human-guided bomb in suicidal attacks against the advancing Allies.

The Fi 103R started development in 1944 at a time when Germany was anticipating a major naval landing by the Allies in western Europe. It was believed that a disposable aircraft armed with 900 kilograms (2,000 lb) of explosives would potentially inflict heavy damage on important targets such as enemy shipping. However, these attacks would have very likely involved the death of the pilot, who was expected to exit the aircraft and parachute away mere moments before the aircraft's impact. These pilots were reportedly to be volunteers and aware of the risk to their own lives. The "Leonidas Squadron", V. Gruppe of the Luftwaffe's Kampfgeschwader 200, was established in early 1944 to conduct these attacks.

Initially, the development of a manned Fi 103 had been considered but passed over for the rival Messerschmitt Me 328 project. However, this aircraft had fundamental difficulties with its pulsejet propulsion, which led to officials opting to switch focus to the Fi 103R's development. Pilots were trained using gliders, including specially-adapted ones capable of high-speed diving. It was intended that their training would then continue with the R-III, a twin-seat powered model of the Fi 103R. In September 1944, the maiden flight of the Fi 103R occurred, which resulted in a crash; a second aircraft flown on the next day also crashed. One month later, development was shelved at the direct order of Hitler, who had been encouraged by Albert Speer and Werner Baumbach not to pursue suicide attacks.

== History ==
=== Background ===
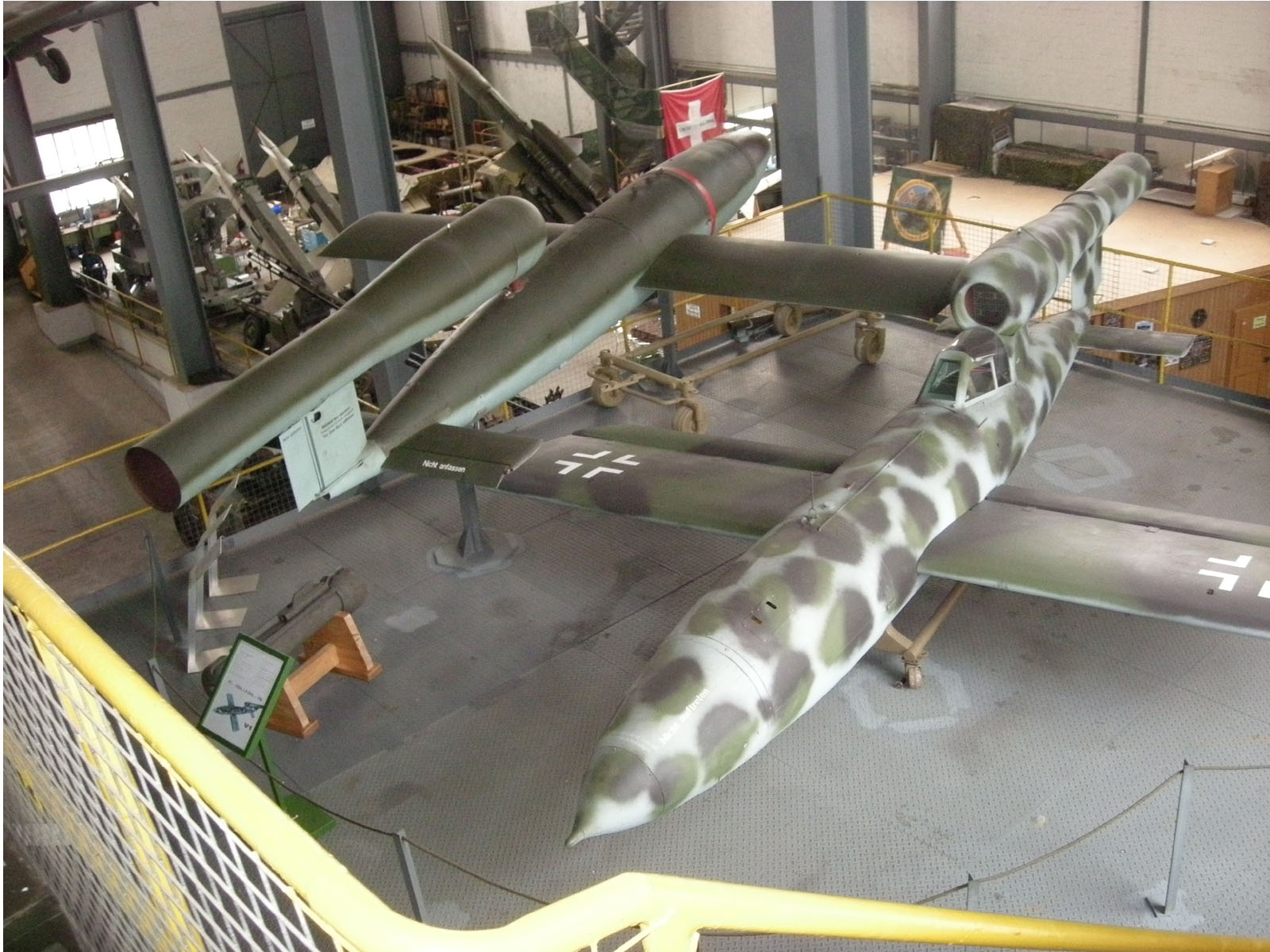
Fieseler Fi 103R (with cockpit, in camouflage paint), to the right of a standard V-1 flying bomb (Fieseler Fi 103), at the Swiss Military Museum

During the latter part of the Second World War, it was becoming increasingly clear that Germany was on the defensive and that increasingly drastic measures would be needed just to maintain the status quo against the Allies. In February 1944, Adolf Hitler was initially dismissive of the need to resort to tactics such as suicide attacks, as was advocated by figures such as Otto Skorzeny, Hanna Reitsch, and Hajo Herrmann, but he did authorise the formation of a squadron to prepare for such missions. Accordingly, the Leonidas Squadron, a part of Kampfgeschwader 200, was established to be this suicide squadron. Volunteers for this squadron were required to sign a declaration which said, "I hereby voluntarily apply to be enrolled in the suicide group as part of a human glider-bomb. I fully understand that employment in this capacity will entail my own death."

The concept called for an aircraft that would be armed with a single 900 kilograms (2,000 lb) explosive device that would detonate upon impact with the target, which was typically envisioned to be Allied shipping. Two different aircraft were quickly considered to be the most suitable options available, the Messerschmitt Me 328 and the Fieseler Fi 103 (better known as the V-1 flying bomb), although both required development work. Officials opted to pass over the Fi 103 in favour of the Me 328. Being largely composed of wood and conceived of as potentially suitable for using multiple means of propulsion, the Me 328 had been worked on since 1941.

However, difficulties were encountered in the Me 328 during prototype testing, the vibration caused by its pulsejet engines having been a particular source of issues, leading to work being suspended. The project had also encountered political opposition from figures such as the head of the SS, Heinrich Himmler, who sought the programme's termination. The programme was placed under the supervision of the SS, but was not terminated at this point; instead, Skorzeny, who had been investigating the possibility of using crewed torpedoes against Allied shipping, was personally briefed by Hitler to revive the project.

Skorzeny played a key role in the programme's reappraisal, which included its reorientation towards the Fi 103. The project was given the codename "Reichenberg" after the capital of the former Czechoslovak territory "Reichsgau Sudetenland" (present-day Liberec), while the aircraft themselves were referred to as "Reichenberg-Geräte" (Reichenberg apparatus). It has been claimed that one reason for the switch towards the Fi 103R was its ability to offer the pilot a slim chance of survival.

=== DFS development ===
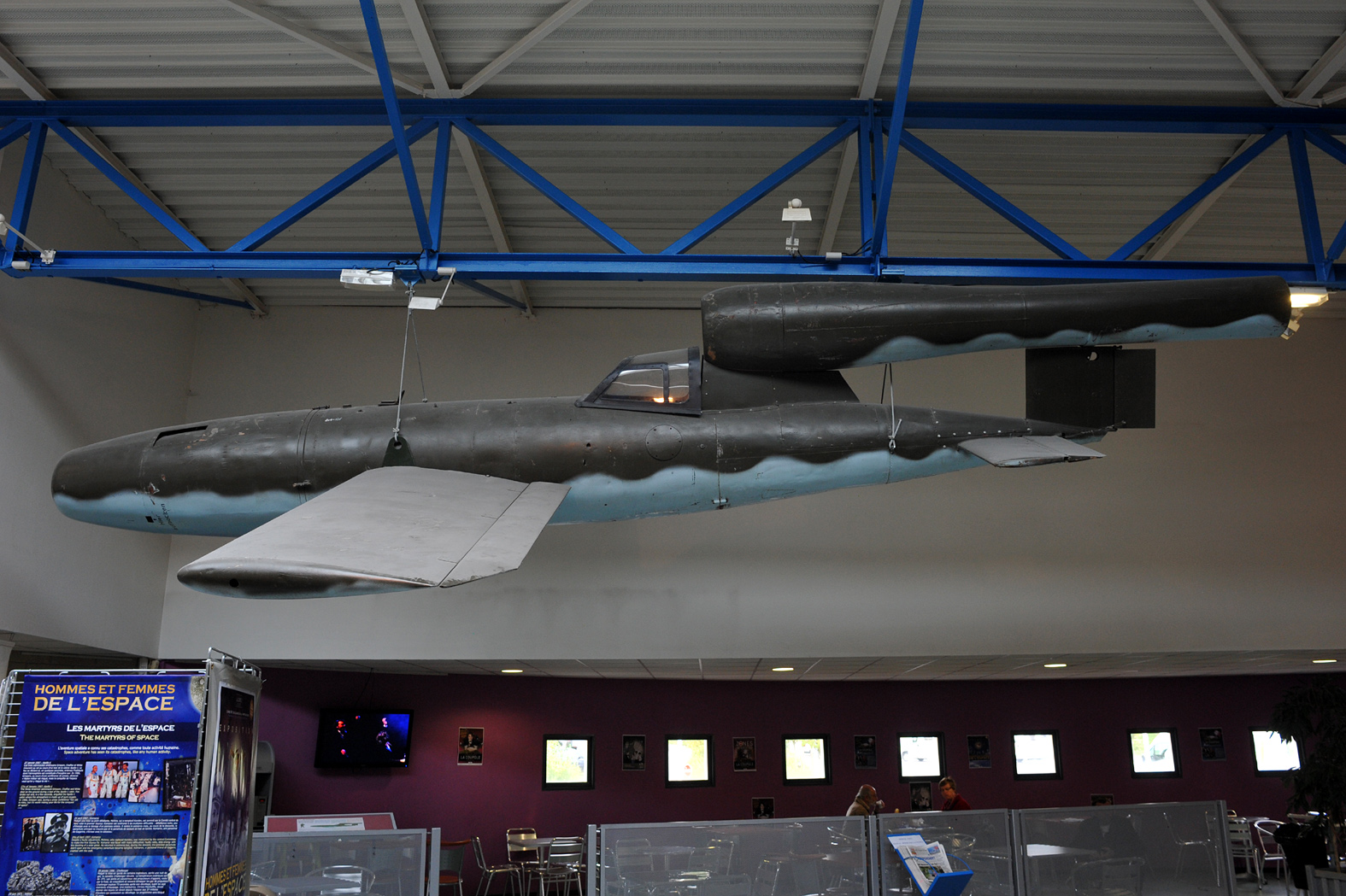
The forward support pylon for the Reichenberg crewed V-1 resembles a broad-chord version of the American Loon's similar component

In the summer of 1944, the Deutsche Forschungsanstalt für Segelflug (German Research Institute for Sailplane Flight) at Ainring took on the task of developing a crewed version of the Fi 103, an example was made ready for testing within days and a production line was established at Dannenberg.

The V-1 was transformed into the Reichenberg via the addition of a compact cockpit at the point of the fuselage that was immediately ahead of the pulsejet's intake, where the compressed-air cylinders were fitted on a standard V-1. This cramped cockpit was outfitted with only basic flight instrumentation, along with a bucket seat composed of plywood. The single-piece canopy incorporated an armoured front panel and opened to the side to allow entry. The two displaced compressed-air cylinders were replaced by a single one, fitted in the rear in the space which normally accommodated the V-1's autopilot. At no point was any landing gear fitted to the aircraft. The wings were fitted with hardened edges that would cut the cables of barrage balloons.

It was proposed that a He 111 bomber would carry either one or two Reichenbergs beneath its wings, releasing them close to the target. The pilots would then steer their aircraft towards the target, jettisoning the cockpit canopy shortly before impact and bailing out. It was estimated that the chances of a pilot surviving such a bailout were less than 1% due to the proximity of the pulsejet's intake to the cockpit.

== Operational history ==
=== Training ===
Trainees were initially prepared using ordinary gliders to get them used to handling unpowered flight; specially-adapted gliders with shortened wings would be used to provide more advanced training. Amongst other things, these adaptations enabled them to dive at speeds of up to 300 kilometres per hour (190 mph). Once sufficient proficiency had been demonstrated, the last stage of training would be conducted using the dual-control R-II. According to Christopher, there was no shortage of volunteers for the programme despite the open acknowledgement that the mission involved their near-certain demise.

Training began on the R-I and R-II and, although landing them on a skid was difficult, the aircraft handled well and it was anticipated that the Leonidas Squadron would soon be using the machines. On 28 July 1944, Albert Speer wrote to Hitler, stating his opposition to the wasting of both men and machines on the Allies in France and suggested their deployment to be more worthwhile against Soviet power stations on the Eastern Front. These were not the only alternative targets that were proposed; other potential uses for the Fi 103R included ramming enemy bombers. Such was the interest in this latter role that formal evaluations were conducted in the final months of the conflict.

=== Test flights ===
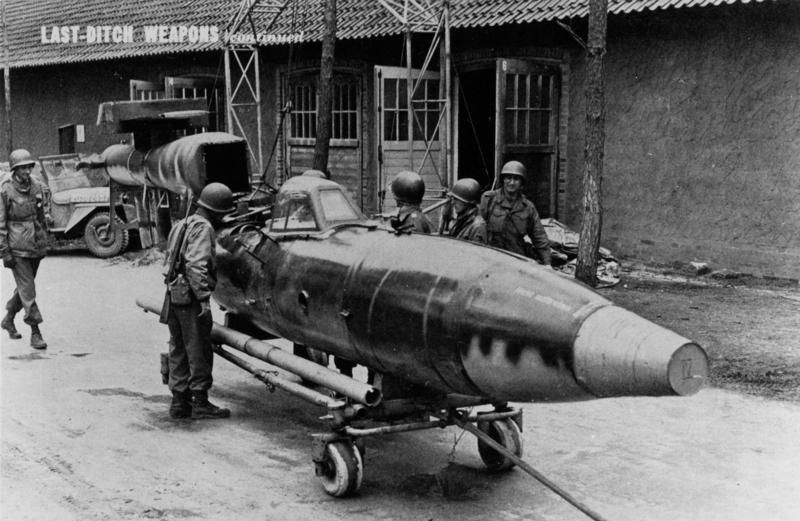
US troops inspect Fieseler Fi 103R at Neu Tramm 1945

During September 1944, the first real flight was performed at the Erprobungsstelle Rechlin, the Reichenberg being dropped from a Heinkel He 111. However, this flight ended in a crash, which was attributed to the pilot having lost control of the aircraft after accidentally jettisoning the canopy. The next day, a second flight was conducted that also ended in a crash. The technical department struggled to explain these losses, although there were suspicions that the Fi 103R's flight characteristics could make landing particularly challenging.

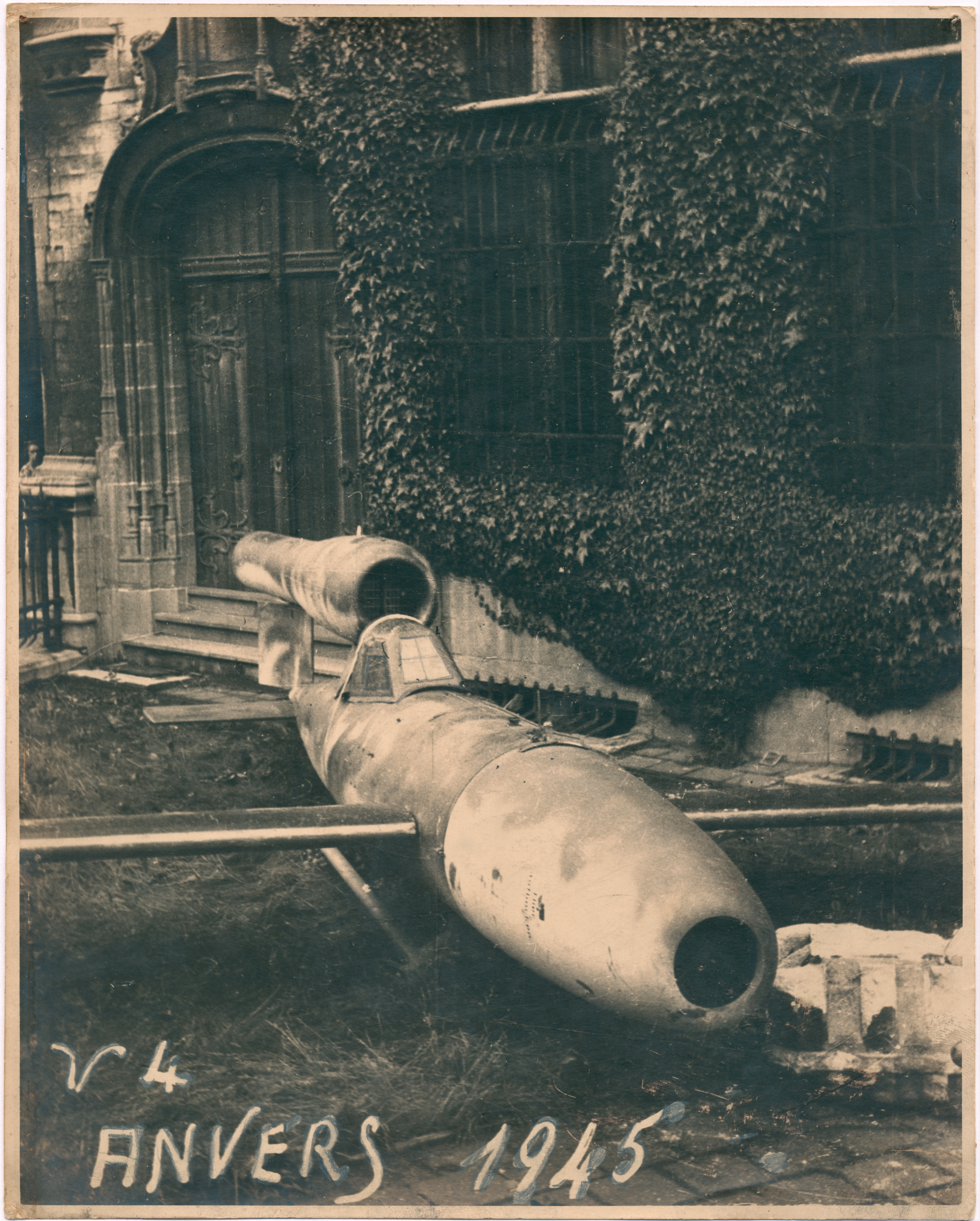
Fieseler Fi 103R exposed in Antwerp in 1945

Seeking to avoid further accidents while also hoping to uncover the source of these difficulties, further test flights were carried out by Heinz Kensche and Hanna Reitsch, both of whom were particularly accomplished test pilots. Reitsch herself experienced several crashes, which she survived unscathed. On 5 November 1944, during the second test flight of the R-III, a wing detached from the aircraft due to the vibrations; Kensche managed to parachute to safety, albeit with some difficulty due to the cramped cockpit. It was concluded that the Fi 103R had a relatively high stall speed and that pilots, unaware of this, had been attempting to land at speeds that were too slow for the aircraft to maintain stable flight.

=== Cancellation ===
During October 1944, Werner Baumbach assumed command of KG 200, and quickly opted to shelve the Reichenberg in favour of the Mistel project. By this point, the Allies had consolidated their position in France and thus the value of attacking potential invasion fleets was no longer considered to be as pressing as dealing with land warfare. On 15 March 1945, in a meeting between Baumbach, Speer, and Hitler, the latter was convinced that suicide missions were not part of the German warrior tradition; later that same day, Baumbach ordered the disbandment of the Reichenberg unit.

== Variants ==
There were five variants: By October 1944 about 175 R-IVs were ready for action.

- R-I – The basic single-seat unpowered glider.
- R-II – Unpowered glider; had a second cockpit fitted where the warhead would normally be.
- R-III – A pulsejet-powered two-seater.
- R-IV – The standard-powered operational model.
- R-V – Powered trainer for the Heinkel He 162 (shorter nose).

== Aircraft on display ==
- Flying Heritage & Combat Armor Museum, Everett, Washington
- Canadian War Museum (collected by Farley Mowat, under restoration 2009).
- Lashenden Air Warfare Museum, Headcorn, Kent, (restored N° 85)
- La Coupole, Saint-Omer, France., (restored N° 126)
- Schweizerisches Militärmuseum Full, Full-Reuenthal, Switzerland, (restored N° 27)
- Stinson Air Field, San Antonio, Texas, United States (replica).
- National Military Museum (Soesterberg) Netherlands (restored N° 24)
- Muzeum Molke, Ludwikowice Kłodzkie, Poland (replica)

== Specifications (Fi 103R-IV) ==
Data from The warplanes of the Third Reich

General characteristics

- Crew: 1
- Length: 8.00 m (26 ft 3 in)
- Wingspan: 5.72 m (18 ft 9 in)
- Gross weight: 2,250 kg (4,960 lb)
- Powerplant: 1 × Argus As 109-014 pulsejet, 2.9 kN (660 lbf) thrust - static thrust: 2.2 kN (500 lbf); max thrust: 3.6 kN (800 lbf)

Performance

- Cruise speed: 650 km/h (400 mph, 350 kn) at 2,400 m (8,000 ft)
- Never exceed speed: 800 km/h (500 mph, 430 kn)
- Range: 329 km (204 mi, 178 nmi) from point of launch, cruising at 2,500 m (8,200 ft)
- Endurance: 32 minutes

Armament
850 kg (1,874 lb) high-explosive warhead

== See also ==
- Fieseler Fi 103 (V-1 flying bomb)
- Kawanishi Baika (IJN)
- Leonidas Squadron, KG 200's "suicide unit".
- Yokosuka MXY-7 Ohka, the Japanese suicide rocket aircraft.
