= 2025 Syddjurs municipal election =

Municipal election in Denmark

← 2021	18 November 2025	2029 →

All 27 seats to the Syddjurs municipal council 14 seats needed for a majority
- Turnout: 25,747 (72.6%) ▲1.6%
	First party	Second party	Third party
	A	V	F
Party	Social Democrats	Venstre	Green Left
Last election	7 seats, 25.2%	7 seats, 23.5%	4 seats, 13.7%
Seats won	9	6	3
Seat change	▲2	▼1	▼1
Popular vote	7,129	4,850	3,151
Percentage	28.1%	19.1%	12.4%
Swing	▲2.8%	▼4.4%	▼1.3%
	Fourth party	Fifth party	Sixth party
	C	Æ	Ø
Party	Conservatives	Denmark Democrats	Red-Green Alliance
Last election	5 seats, 16.4%	Did not stand	2 seats, 6.3%
Seats won	3	3	1
Seat change	▼2	▲3	▼1
Popular vote	3,013	2,447	1,358
Percentage	11.9%	9.6%	5.3%
Swing	▼4.6%	New	▼0.9%
	Seventh party	Eighth party
	B	Å
Party	Social Liberals	The Alternative
Last election	1 seat, 4.8%	0 seats, 2.7%
Seats won	1	1
Seat change	0	▲1
Popular vote	910	849
Percentage	3.6%	3.3%
Swing	▼1.2%	▲0.6%
Mayor before election
Michael Stegger Jensen
Social Democrats
Mayor after election
Michael Stegger Jensen
Social Democrats

The 2025 Syddjurs Municipal election was held on November 18, 2025, to elect the 27 members to sit in the regional council for the Syddjurs Municipal council, in the period of 2026 to 2029. Michael Stegger Jensen from Social Democrats, would secure re-election.

== Background ==
Following the 2021 election, Michael Stegger Jensen from Social Democrats became mayor for his first term. Stegger Jensen is set to run for the mayoral position again.

== Electoral system ==
For elections to Danish municipalities, a number varying from 9 to 31 are chosen to be elected to the municipal council. The seats are then allocated using the D'Hondt method and a closed list proportional representation. Syddjurs Municipality had 27 seats in 2025.

== Electoral alliances ==
=== Electoral Alliance 1 ===
Party		Political alignment
A	Social Democrats	Centre-left
F	Green Left	Centre-left to Left-wing
Ø	Red-Green Alliance	Left-wing to Far-Left
Å	The Alternative	Centre-left to Left-wing

=== Electoral Alliance 2 ===
Party		Political alignment
B	Social Liberals	Centre to Centre-left
C	Conservatives	Centre-right

=== Electoral Alliance 3 ===
Party		Political alignment
I	Liberal Alliance	Centre-right to Right-wing
V	Venstre	Centre-right

=== Electoral Alliance 4 ===
Party		Political alignment
O	Danish People's Party	Right-wing to Far-right
Z	Velfærdslisten Syddjurs	Local politics
Æ	Denmark Democrats	Right-wing to Far-right

== Results by polling station ==
Division	A	B	C	F	I	J	O	V	Z	Æ	Ø	Å
Division	%	%	%	%	%	%	%	%	%	%	%	%
Ebeltoft	25.2	6.8	17.6	12.8	1.9	0.1	3.1	16.8	0.0	6.7	5.3	3.0
Mols	24.3	2.4	5.5	12.4	1.8	0.0	1.4	27.4	0.0	8.1	7.0	7.9
Tirstrup	18.3	1.7	6.9	22.1	2.3	0.3	3.9	11.5	0.0	18.8	7.9	4.7
Kolind	21.6	1.6	24.3	10.8	3.1	0.3	3.1	15.4	0.0	12.9	3.6	2.4
Ryomgård	37.8	1.5	9.9	8.7	3.1	0.1	2.6	13.5	0.0	15.9	3.9	2.1
Hornslet	32.8	3.4	10.4	11.4	3.1	0.1	3.4	20.6	0.0	7.2	5.0	2.0
Mørke	29.3	2.4	5.6	15.3	4.0	0.2	3.7	18.2	0.0	14.2	4.3	2.0
Rønde	27.7	3.5	9.9	12.1	3.0	0.1	2.5	22.5	0.0	7.5	6.1	3.9

== Results ==
Party		Votes	%	+/-	Seats	+/-
Syddjurs Municipality
A	Social Democrats	7,129	28.05	+2.83	9	+2
V	Venstre	4,850	19.08	-4.43	6	-1
F	Green Left	3,151	12.40	-1.25	3	-1
C	Conservatives	3,013	11.86	-4.56	3	-2
Æ	Denmark Democrats	2,447	9.63	New	3	New
Ø	Red-Green Alliance	1,358	5.34	-0.92	1	-1
B	Social Liberals	910	3.58	-1.23	1	0
Å	The Alternative	849	3.34	+0.61	1	+1
O	Danish People's Party	739	2.91	+0.03	0	0
I	Liberal Alliance	692	2.72	New	0	New
Z	Velfærdslisten Syddjurs	248	0.98	New	0	New
J	Partiet Samfundssind for Frihed	27	0.11	New	0	New
Total		25,413	100	N/A	27	N/A
Invalid votes		53	0.15	-0.02		
Blank votes		281	0.79	-0.03		
Turnout		25,747	72.64	+1.58		
Source: valg.dk

== Opinion polls ==
Polling firm	Fieldwork date	Sample size	A	V	C	F	Ø	B	O	Å	I	J	Z	Æ	Others	Lead
Epinion	4 Sep - 13 Oct 2025	501	29.6	14.2	5.2	16.2	7.5	1.2	5.3	2.7	6.2	–	–	11.4	0.4	13.4
2024 european parliament election	9 Jun 2024		15.6	14.2	7.9	18.4	6.2	5.6	6.4	3.1	5.9	–	–	10.0	–	2.8
2022 general election	1 Nov 2022		28.6	13.1	4.2	8.0	4.8	2.8	2.4	4.5	7.8	–	–	10.4	–	15.5
2021 regional election	16 Nov 2021		32.5	21.7	12.0	7.9	7.0	3.8	3.8	1.8	1.0	–	–	–	–	10.8
2021 municipal election	16 Nov 2021		25.2 (7)	23.5 (7)	16.4 (5)	13.7 (4)	6.3 (2)	4.8 (1)	2.9 (0)	2.7 (0)	–	–	–	–	–	1.7
