= 2021 Syddjurs municipal election =

← 2017	16 November 2021	2025 →

All 27 seats to the Syddjurs Municipal Council 14 seats needed for a majority
- Turnout: 24,781 (71.1%) ▼2.7pp
	First party	Second party	Third party
	A	V	C
Party	Social Democrats	Venstre	Conservatives
Last election	8 seats, 25.6%	8 seats, 29.6%	1 seat, 4.4%
Seats won	7	7	5
Seat change	▼1	▼1	▲4
Popular vote	6.160	5,743	4,010
Percentage	25.2%	23.5%	16.4%
Swing	▼0.4%	▼6.1%	▲12.0%
	Fourth party	Fifth party	Sixth party
	F	Ø	B
Party	Green Left	Red–Green Alliance	Social Liberals
Last election	4 seats, 15.6%	1 seat, 4.6%	1 seats, 5.7%
Seats won	4	2	1
Seat change	0	▲1	0
Popular vote	3,335	1,529	1,174
Percentage	13.6%	6.3%	4.8%
Swing	▼2.0%	▲1.7%	▼0.9%
	Seventh party	Eighth party	Ninth party
	D	O	Å
Party	New Right	Danish People's Party	The Alternative
Last election	0 seats, 0.6%	3 seats, 8.5%	1 seats, 3.9%
Seats won	1	0	0
Seat change	▲1	▼3	▼1
Popular vote	1,105	704	666
Percentage	4.5%	2.9%	2.7%
Swing	▲3.9%	▼5.6%	▼1.2%
Mayor before election
Ole Bollesen
Social Democrats
Mayor after election
Michael Stegger Jensen
Social Democrats

Since the 2007 municipal reform, no mayor of Syddjurs Municipality has had more than one term. When the 2007 municipal reform applied, Vilfred Hansen from the Social Democrats was mayor. After the 2009 Syddjurs municipal election, Kirstine Bille from the Green Left became mayor, but the Green Left lost the mayor seat in 2013 to Venstre. In the 2017 Syddjurs municipal election, the result led to Ole Bollesen from the Social Democrats, becoming mayor. However he announced in January 2020 that he would not stand to be re-elected in 2021.

The Social Democrats and Venstre, who became the two biggest parties in the 2017 election respectively, retained their positions, but both parties lost a seat each. Conservatives saw similar success in Syddjurs, as seen in many municipalities nationwide, and would win 5 seats compared to just 1 they won in 2017. However the parties of the traditional red bloc still won 14 of the 27 seats, and it was later announced that the Social Democrats would keep holding the mayor's office, and Michael Stegger Jensen would be the one to take over from Ole Bollesen.

== Electoral system ==
For elections to Danish municipalities, a number varying from 9 to 31 are chosen to be elected to the municipal council. The seats are then allocated using the D'Hondt method and a closed list proportional representation. Syddjurs Municipality had 27 seats in 2021.

Unlike in Danish General Elections, in elections to municipal councils, electoral alliances are allowed.

== Electoral alliances ==
=== Electoral Alliance 1 ===
Party		Political alignment
Ø	Red–Green Alliance	Left-wing to Far-Left
Å	The Alternative	Centre-left to Left-wing

=== Electoral Alliance 2 ===
Party		Political alignment
C	Conservatives	Centre-right
D	New Right	Right-wing to Far-right
O	Danish People's Party	Right-wing to Far-right
V	Venstre	Centre-right

=== Electoral Alliance 3 ===
Party		Political alignment
B	Social Liberals	Centre to Centre-left
F	Green Left	Centre-left to Left-wing

== Results by polling station ==
Division	A	B	C	D	F	O	V	Ø	Å
Division	%	%	%	%	%	%	%	%	%
Ebeltoft	19.0	10.0	21.6	3.9	15.9	2.4	19.2	5.6	2.6
Mols	19.3	2.7	10.8	4.1	14.8	2.8	31.2	8.4	5.9
Tirstrup	15.9	1.9	11.5	6.4	28.8	3.5	21.1	8.3	2.7
Kolind	20.8	2.0	25.0	5.6	9.7	3.1	26.9	4.7	2.1
Ryomgård	38.5	2.4	12.6	5.9	10.2	3.2	20.4	5.4	1.4
Hornslet	29.3	4.1	18.0	3.7	11.7	2.9	22.6	6.0	1.8
Rønde	25.5	4.6	15.7	4.0	12.0	2.2	25.3	7.4	3.4
Mørke	32.4	3.2	7.3	6.1	14.0	4.9	25.3	4.7	2.1

== Results ==
Party		Votes	%	+/-	Seats	+/-
Syddjurs Municipality
A	Social Democrats	6,160	25.22	-0.42	7	-1
V	Venstre	5,743	23.51	-6.07	7	-1
C	Conservatives	4,010	16.42	+12.06	5	+4
F	Green Left	3,335	13.65	-1.92	4	0
Ø	Red-Green Alliance	1,529	6.26	+1.66	2	+1
B	Social Liberals	1,174	4.81	-0.91	1	0
D	New Right	1,105	4.52	+3.94	1	+1
O	Danish People's Party	704	2.88	-5.57	0	-3
Å	The Alternative	666	2.73	-1.16	0	-1
Total		24,426	100	N/A	27	N/A
Invalid votes		60	0.17	-0.02		
Blank votes		295	0.85	+0.04		
Turnout		24,781	71.06	-2.77		
Source: valg.dk
