= Sonderkommando Elbe =

Sonderkommando "Elbe"
- Active: 7 April 1945
- Country: Nazi Germany
- Branch: Luftwaffe
- Role: special attack interceptor
- Size: 2,000 aircraft 2,000 volunteers 300 fighter pilots
- Engagements: Air war/aerial ramming over Germany, 7 April 1945

Insignia
- Roundel: Balkenkreuz

Aircraft flown
- Interceptor: Messerschmitt Bf 109

Sonderkommando "Elbe" (lit. 'Special Command Elbe') was the name of a World War II Luftwaffe task force assigned to bring down heavy bombers by ramming them in mid-air.

Its sole mission took place on 7 April 1945, when a force of 180 Bf 109s managed to ram 15 Allied bombers, downing eight of them.

The task force was created to cause losses sufficient to halt or at least reduce the Western Allies' bombing of Germany. The pilots were expected to parachute out either just before or after they had collided with their target.

== History ==
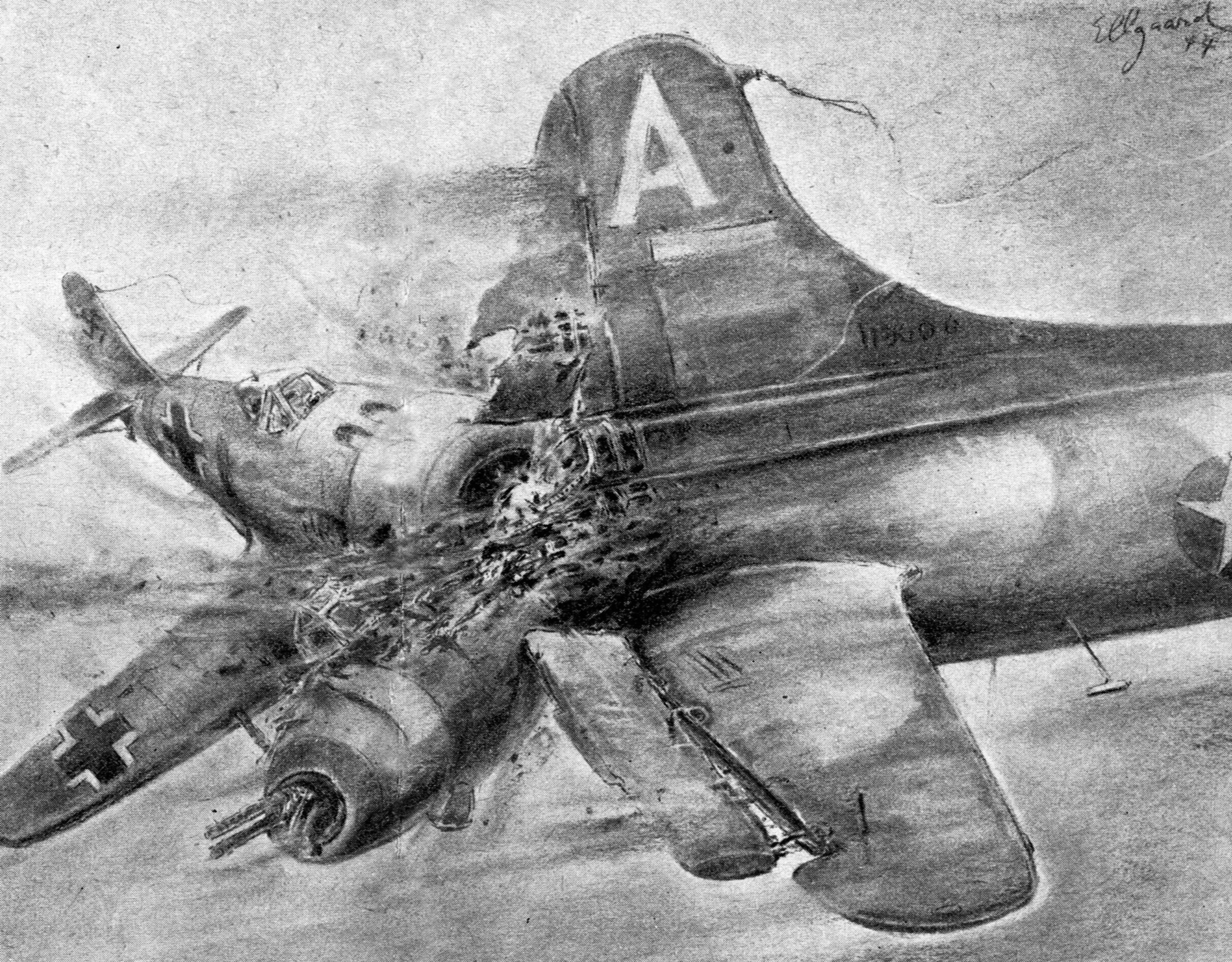
A 1944 drawing by Helmuth Ellgaard illustrating "ramming"

Sonderkommando means "special command", and the Elbe is one of the main rivers in Germany.

The task force's aircraft were mostly later G-versions (Gustav) of the Messerschmitt Bf 109. Stripped of most armor and armament, the planes had one synchronized machine gun (usually a single MG 131 in the upper engine cowling) instead of up to four automatic weapons (usually including a pair of 20mm or 30mm underwing-mount autocannon) on fully equipped Bf 109G interceptors, and were only allotted 60 rounds each, a normally insufficient amount for bomber-interception missions.

Sonderkommando Elbe pilots were trained to ram one of three sensitive areas on the bombers: the empennage (tail) with its relatively delicate control surfaces, the engine nacelles which were connected to the highly explosive fuel system, or the cockpit itself. One of the most famous reports of cockpit ramming was against a Consolidated B-24 Liberator heavy bomber, nicknamed "Palace of Dallas", along with another bomber that the German plane careened into after slicing the cockpit of the Palace of Dallas.

== Order of battle ==
=== Successful missions ===
Rank / Name / Former Unit e/a Unit Status

- Uffz. Heinrich Rosner, (ex-III/JG.102), two B-24 Liberators of the 389th Bomb Group; the first B-24 rammed was lead bomber 44-49524; Rosner's aircraft then careened into an unidentified second B-24, possibly the deputy lead bomber 44-49533 "Palace of Dallas" Survived
- Obfw. Werner Linder, (ex-EJG.1), 1 B-17 Flying Fortress 388th Bomb Group,43-38869 or 42-97195 (both Aircraft rammed) Linder KIA
- Fhr. Eberhard Prock, 1 B-17 452nd Bomb Group, KIA shot down by P-51.
- Fw. Reinhold Hedwig, 1 B-17 452nd Bomb Group, KIA, Shot down by 339 Fighter Group P-51.*
- Uffz. Werner Zell, 1 B-17 452nd Bomb Group, WIA Shot down by P-51.*
- Ogfr. Horst Siedel, 1 B-17 452nd Bomb Group, KIA*
- Lt. Hans Nagel, (ex-IV/JG.102), 1 B-17 490th Bomb Group,KIA, Shot it down by conventional armament, damaged a second B-17, 43-38082 "Lady Helene", by ramming.
- Uffz. Klaus Hahn, 1 B-17 43-39126 487th Bomb Group, WIA – Left arm by 4 P-51Ds fire.
- Heinrich Henkel, 1 B-24 "Sacktime" 467th Bomb Group, WIA by P-51s, Survived.
- Unknown Bf 109 pilot, 1 B-17 42-97071 100th Bomb Group, KIA
- Unknown Bf 109 pilot, 1 B-17 43-38514 "EZ Goin" 100th Bomb Group/349th Bomb SQ (Plane badly damaged but flyable) KIA(?)
- Unknown Bf 109 pilot, 1 B-17 44-8744 385th Bomb Group, KIA
- Unknown Bf 109 pilot, 1 B-17 380550 490th Bomb Group, KIA

Luftwaffe records claim at least 22–24 American aircraft fell victim to the Sonderkommando Elbe unit.

(WIA – wounded in action / KIA – killed in action)

- As noted above there are four Luftwaffe claims of ramming against B-17s of the 452nd Bomb Group; two claims can be confirmed:
  - B-17 42-31366 "Old Outhouse" of 731st Bomb Sq
  - B-17 44-8634 "Ida Wanna" of the 728th Bomb Sq

== See also ==
- Defence of the Reich
- Kamikaze (air-to-ship)

Ki-61 Special Attack Unit (air-to-air)

- Leonidas Squadron
- Taran: Aerial ramming § Soviet Union

== Bibliography ==
- Adrian Weir "The Last Flight of the Luftwaffe", Arms and Armour Press 1997
- David Irving "Goering: Eine Biographie", Reinbeck bei Hamburg 1989
- Alfred Price "The Last Year of the Luftwaffe", Arms and Armour Press 1991
- David Irving "Hitler's War", Macmillan 1977
- "Rise and Fall of the German Air Force 1933–1945", St. Martin Press 1983
- William Green "Warplanes of the Third Reich", Macdonald and Jane΄s 1970
- Martin Caidin "Flying Forts", Ballantine Books 1968
- Werner Girbig "Six months to oblivion", Schiffer Publishing 1991
- David Baker "Adolf Galland: The authorized biography", Presidio Press 1997
- Herrmann Hajo "Eagle's Wings", Airlife 1991
