= Aarhus Airport =

Airport in Denmark

Aarhus Airport Aarhus Lufthavn
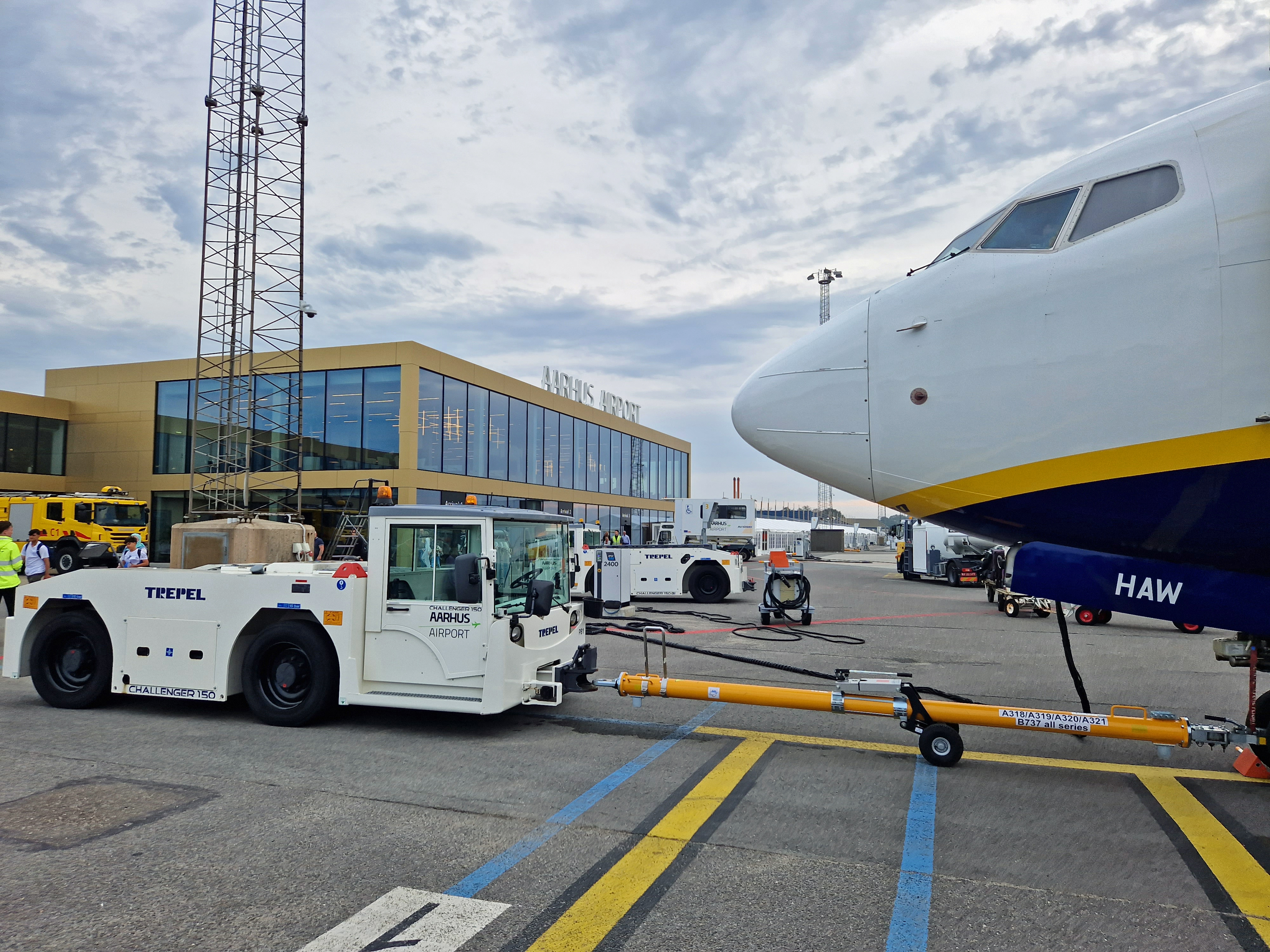
- IATA: AAR; ICAO: EKAH

Summary
- Airport type: Public
- Operator: Aarhus Airport A/S
- Serves: Aarhus, Denmark
- Location: Tirstrup
- Elevation AMSL: 82 ft (25 m)
- Coordinates: 56°18′15″N 010°37′09″E
- Website: aar.dk

Maps
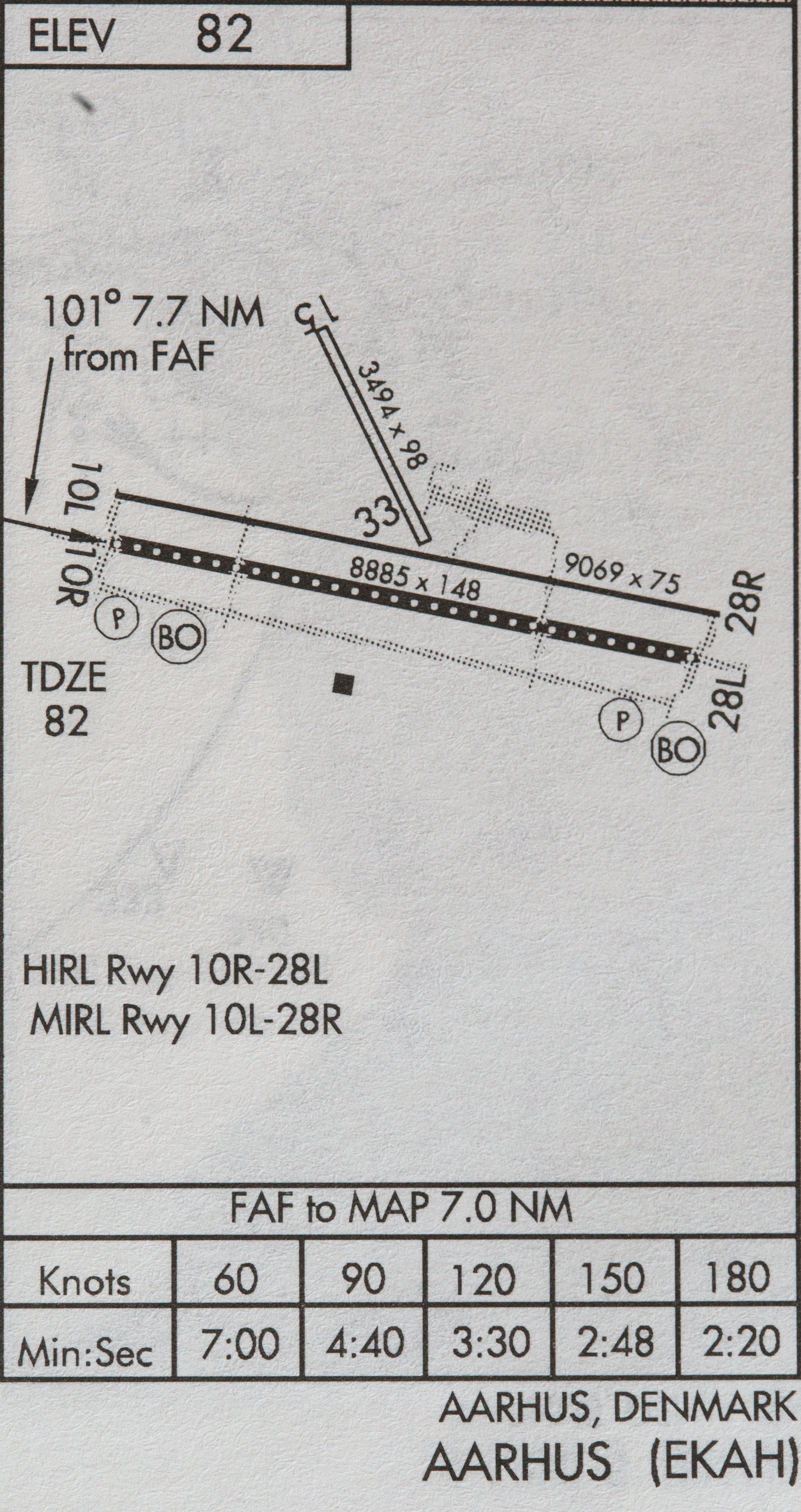

- Location of airport in Denmark

Runways
Direction	Length		Surface
Direction	m	ft	Surface
10L/28R	2,777	9,110	Asphalt/concrete
10R/28L	2,702	8,864	Asphalt/concrete

Statistics (2019)
- Passengers: 500,365
- Source: Airport website, Danish AIP at EUROCONTROL

Aarhus Airport (IATA: AAR, ICAO: EKAH) is an international airport located 19.4 nautical miles (35.9 km; 22.3 mi) northeast of Aarhus, Denmark.

== History ==
The airfield was established in 1943 by German occupying forces in World War II and was later used as a Cold War military base for the Danish and other allied airforces until the 1990s. The airport still contains a small military depot and plays host to occasional training exercises; the last NATO exercise was in 2007.

The current passenger terminal dates from 1981 with renovations performed between 2007 and 2009 and again in late 2016. Since 1946, the airport has carried civilian traffic and is the primary gateway for Aarhus, located 40 km from the city centre via the Djursland motorway. Since December 2016, the local authority of Aarhus Kommune is the major shareholder in the airport,

The airport carried 500,490 passengers in 2019.

In March 2021, a construction project was announced. The project is scheduled to be completed in 2022. It includes a new hotel and increases terminal floor area from 5,000 m^{2} (54,000 sq ft) to 10,000 m^{2} (110,000 sq ft). Three new gates will be built so the airport has seven in total.

== Facilities ==
The airport is at an elevation of 25 metres (82 ft) above mean sea level. It has two runways: 10R/28L is 2,702 by 45 metres (8,865 ft × 148 ft) and 10L/28R is 2,777 by 23 metres (9,111 ft × 75 ft).

== Airlines and destinations ==
The following airlines operate regular scheduled and charter flights at the airport:

Airlines	Destinations
Aegean Airlines	Seasonal charter: Chania
Air Cairo	Seasonal charter: Hurghada
Airseven	Seasonal charter: Chania, Funchal, Mytilene, Palma de Mallorca, Paphos, Preveza/Lefkada Zakynthos
Norwegian Air Shuttle	Seasonal: Alicante, Málaga, Palma de Mallorca
Pegasus Airlines	Seasonal: Antalya
Ryanair	Gdansk, London–Stansted, Málaga; Seasonal: Bergamo (begins 28 March 2027), Corfu, Katowice, Palma de Mallorca, Riga Zadar
Scandinavian Airlines	Copenhagen, Oslo; Seasonal: Sälen-Trysil

== Ground transportation ==
There are three parking areas with over 1300 parking spaces.

An airport bus, service 925X, takes passengers from the airport to Aarhus railway station and back. The bus is scheduled to meet every flight. Bus route 212 between Ebeltoft (20min) and Randers (60 min) stops at the airport. As it is a public service it is not scheduled around the flight timetable. 6–7 buses operate daily to Randers and 6–7 to Ebeltoft.

== See also ==
- List of the largest airports in the Nordic countries
