= Theodor Rowehl =

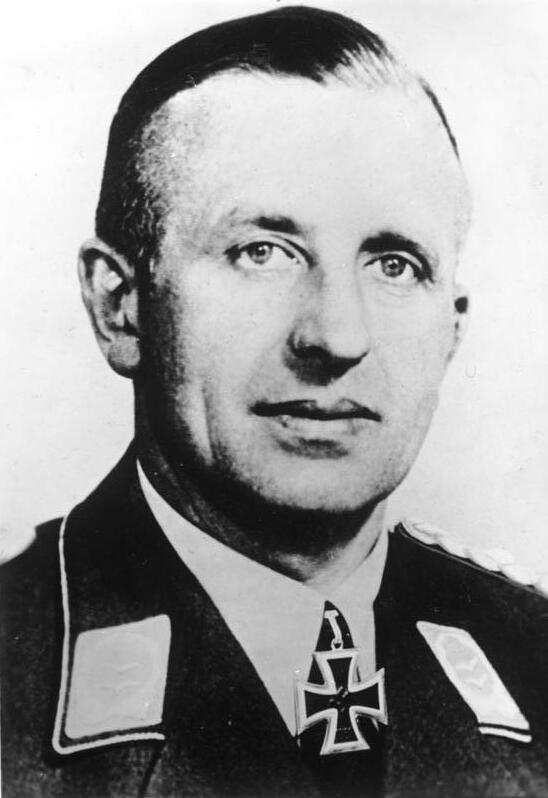
- Lieutenant Colonel Theodor Rowehl in 1940, the year he was awarded the Knight's Cross of the Iron Cross
- Born: 9 February 1894; Barstede, Ihlow, (Note: David Kahn states that he was from Göttingen. However, according to Veit Scherzer, he was born in Barstede, part of Ihlow.) German Empire
- Died: 6 June 1978 (aged 84); Münster, West Germany
- Military career
- Allegiance: Nazi Germany
- Branch: Luftwaffe
- Rank: Oberst
- Conflicts: World War I, World War II
- Awards: Knight's Cross of the Iron Cross

Theodor Rowehl (9 February 1894 – 6 June 1978) was a German pilot who founded the Luftwaffe's strategic air reconnaissance programme, and headed what became known as the Rowehl Squadron and became Kampfgeschwader 200 after his resignation in December 1943.

== Early life and service in World War I ==
Rowehl was from Göttingen. In World War I he served in the Imperial German Navy and made reconnaissance flights over England.

== Interwar surveillance ==
After the war, concerned over both the strategic influence of the alliance between the newly reconstituted Poland and France and rumours of Polish construction of border fortifications, Rowehl began flying a hired private plane in his free time and photographing from 13,000 feet (4,000 m) to evade detection. He showed the photographs to the Abwehr, Germany's military intelligence department, and in 1930 was placed on the payroll, sometimes flying along the border with Poland and sometimes penetrating Polish airspace. He flew in the Junkers W 34 that had set the world altitude record at 12,739 metres on 26 May 1929. From this one-man restart of German strategic aerial reconnaissance, (Note: "When Conrad Patzig was appointed head of the Abwehr on 7 June 1932, its strategic aerial photoreconnaissance was still little more than Theodor Rowehl's one-man show.") by 1934, Rowehl's operation had expanded to five aircraft and a small group of hand-picked pilots based at Kiel, and he had re-enlisted in the military as an officer.

After the signing of the German–Polish Non-Aggression Pact in 1934 the unit went underground as the Experimental Post for High-Altitude Flights, purportedly investigating weather, and moved to Berlin, flying out of the Staaken airfield. They expanded operations to aerial reconnaissance of the Soviet Union, France, and Czechoslovakia, where they made the first use in Germany of stereophotography.

In 1936, at Göring's invitation, Rowehl's unit was transferred to the Luftwaffe, where it became the Squadron for Special Purposes, under the General Staff of the 5th Branch (intelligence). The greater financial resources of the Luftwaffe enabled Rowehl to recruit more pilots—he sought out men with experience with aerial photography companies, international airlines and aircraft manufacturers, and two had been aviation adventurers in the 1920s and earlier in the 1930s, Count Hoensbroech and Count Soerma. He also advised on the development of specialised aircraft. The unit used converted bombers, beginning with the Heinkel He 111, later also the Dornier Do 215, Junkers Ju 86 and Junkers Ju 88, Dornier Do 217, Henschel Hs 130, and Messerschmitt Me 410. These were equipped with auxiliary fuel tanks and with an oxygen-nitrogen fuel mix that would supercharge the engine for 20–25 minutes to facilitate escape. Some had pressurised cabins. They were disguised as civilian planes or had minimal markings. Rowehl also advised Zeiss on the development of special automatic cameras which used infra-red film.

The unit, often called the Rowehl Group, provided strategic reconnaissance for both the army and the Luftwaffe. Its base moved to Oranienburg, near the Luftwaffe General Staff, and Rowehl was for a while head of the Luftwaffe's Main Photo Centre.

== World War II ==
After the war began, the squadron grew to three squadrons, each with 12 aeroplanes, and became the Reconnaissance Group of the Commander in Chief of the Air Force (Fernaufklärungsgruppe des Oberbefehlshabers der Luftwaffe, abbreviated AufklGrp OB der Lw). A fourth squadron was created in January 1941 to spy on the Soviet Union. At its largest, the unit comprised 200 to 300 men and approximately 50 aircraft. Rowehl now only occasionally flew.

Extensive aerial intelligence flights were carried out on Soviet air bases after 21 September 1940. The main units involved were the high-altitude Junkers Ju 86, Heinkel He 111, and Dornier Do 217, which could fly so high as to be invulnerable to interception by Soviet fighters. In some cases, Soviet aviation was forbidden to try, as Stalin pursued a non-provocation policy. In the event, the Luftwaffe identified over 100 Soviet airfields between Murmansk and Rostov-on-Don. From October 1939 to June 1941, around 500 flights over the Soviet Union, at altitudes of up to 36,500 ft (11,130 m) were carried out by Theodor Rowehl's reconnaissance group. The flights continued until the 15 June 1941, with special emphasis on airfields. Despite two Ju 86s being forced to land in the Soviet Union largely intact, with exposed cameras and film, Stalin did not register any protest. In the event, the AufklObdL and its intelligence played a vital role in the overwhelming initial success in the air.

In December 1943, the Third Reich was on the defensive. Seeing a diminished need for strategic aerial reconnaissance—he is quoted as having said, "Our homeland we knew"—and needing to care for two small children after his wife was lost in an air raid, Rowehl resigned. His unit was renamed Kampfgeschwader 200 and used for broader purposes.

== Honours ==
- Knight's Cross of the Iron Cross on 27 September 1940 as Oberstleutnant and commander of Aufklärungs-Gruppe des OBdL
