= Kampfgeschwader 200 =

- Active: 1934–45
- Country: Nazi Germany
- Branch: Luftwaffe
- Type: Special operations force
- Role: Aerial long-range reconnaissance Airlift; Airstrike; Special operations Strategic bombing Tactical bombing Test flights
- Size: Wing

Commanders
- Notable commanders: Werner Baumbach

Insignia
- Identification symbol: Geschwaderkennung of A3

Aircraft flown
- Bomber: Dornier Do 335, Arado Ar 232, Heinkel He 111, Heinkel He 177, Junkers Ju 290, Junkers Ju 390, Junkers Ju 188, Heinkel He 115, Dornier Do 24, Dornier Do 18, Arado Ar 196, Siebel Si 204, Arado Ar 240 captured aircraft: B-17, B-24, SM.75, LeO H-246, Short Stirling, de Havilland Mosquito, Bristol Beaufighter
- Fighter: captured: Lockheed P-38 Lightning, Polikarpov I-16, Supermarine Spitfire
- Transport: Arado Ar 232, Blohm & Voss BV 222, Messerschmitt Me 323, Junkers Ju 252, Junkers Ju 352 Herkules, Gotha Go 244

Kampfgeschwader 200 (KG 200) ("[Air] Combat Squadron 200") was a German Luftwaffe special operations unit during World War II. The unit carried out especially difficult bombing and transport operations and long-distance reconnaissance flights, tested new aircraft designs and operated captured aircraft.

== History ==
The unit's history began in 1934, when the Luftwaffe formed a reconnaissance squadron under Oberst Theodor Rowehl and attached it to the Abwehr, the German military intelligence department of the armed forces high command. As the Abwehr started to lose Hitler's goodwill during the war, a new reconnaissance unit, the "2nd Test Formation", was formed in 1942 under the command of Werner Baumbach. This unit was combined with "1st Test Formation" in March 1944 to form KG 200 on 20 February 1944.

On 11 November 1944 Baumbach became Geschwaderkommodore, after which point all aerial special-ops missions were carried out by KG 200 under Baumbach's command.

== Missions ==
The unit carried out a wide variety of missions:

=== Long-range reconnaissance ===
Before the beginning of the war, aerial reconnaissance was usually carried out by civilian Lufthansa planes equipped with cameras. This practice was continued throughout the war as long as civilian airlines remained operational; later on, reconnaissance missions were most often carried out by Junkers Ju 86s flying at very high altitudes or by flying boats. Due to the lack of German aircraft with sufficient range, some recon missions used captured American Boeing B-17 Flying Fortress or Consolidated B-24 Liberator heavy bombers and Soviet Tupolev Tu-2s. For the most part, these machines were used for re-supply roles (dropping in supplies to German forces operating behind enemy lines), or transporting important personnel.

=== The Mistel programme ===
Beginning in 1942, to compensate for its lack of heavy bombers, the Luftwaffe started to experiment with packing some of its war-weary Junkers Ju 88 bombers with enormous shaped-charge warheads and guiding them to their targets with a fighter airplane mounted on the back of the unmanned bomber. Although not as effective as the Luftwaffe planners had hoped, the Mistel programme continued to be developed through 1944. However, few effective operations were flown. The unit was originally intended to attack naval installations at Gibraltar, Leningrad or Scapa Flow in Scotland, but the Allied Operation Overlord diverted efforts to Normandy.

On the night of 24 June 1944, Mistels of Kampfgeschwader 101 were dispatched to bomb targets in the English Channel. Although one of the Ju 88s had to be jettisoned prematurely, the remaining four pilots had successful launches and sank several blockships. Interest in the Scapa Flow attack was maintained, and in August 1944 Mistel forces were concentrated at Grove in Schleswig-Holstein. On 11 November, 1944 RAF Avro Lancasters attacked the German battleship Tirpitz and caused her to capsize. With Tirpitz out of commission there was no requirement for capital ships to be held in the Atlantic theatre, and soon those with the Home Fleet at Scapa Flow were on their way to the Pacific war, leaving the Mistels no worthwhile targets in Scapa Flow.

All Mistels were placed under the command of KG 200 and Oberst (colonel) Joachim Helbig. By late 1944, emphasis was placed on an all-out attack on Soviet armaments and power plants but by March 1945 the bases had been overrun by the Soviet advance. KG 200 was ordered to concentrate Mistel operations against the bridges over the Oder and Neisse rivers. On 27 April, 7 Mistel aircraft under Leutnant Dittmann of II./KG 200, escorted by Fw 190s, were launched against crossings at Küstrin, but only two Mistels got to the target to launch, results were inconclusive and the bridges remained intact. By April, all available Mistel composite airframes had been expended and aircrew dispersed to nearby fighter units.

On 12 April 1945, Henschel Hs 293 standoff missiles were also used against bridges on the Oder by Dornier Do 217 bombers of KG 200.

=== Suicide and near-suicide missions ===
In the last months of the war, a small number of high-ranking German officers pressed for a suicide fighter programme as a last-ditch effort to stop Allied bombing runs over the Reich. This programme, known as Selbstopfer ("self sacrifice"), was intended to use the Fieseler Fi 103R Reichenberg, a manned version of the V-1 flying bomb, to attack enemy bombers and ground targets. Several test flights were carried out by Leonidas Squadron KG 200, and mass production of the conversions had begun, but the programme was stopped due to intervention from Baumbach who felt that these missions would be a waste of valuable pilots.

As part of the Aktion 24 operations, Dornier Do 24 flying boats were modified and loaded with explosives, with the intention that they would be landed on the Vistula River and exploded against river bridges used by Soviet forces. Experienced pilots were to be used to fly the aircraft to a point upstream where it would be left to a "suicide pilot" to ensure a collision with the bridge and ignite the explosives. The assumption that Soviet forces would not react and the unlikelihood of the aircrew managing to return to German-held territory after delivery made the concept highly dubious. The modified aircraft were destroyed on the ground during air raids.

=== Special missions ===
The first Boeing B-17 Flying Fortress bomber operated by German forces, in KG 200 markings. It crash-landed near Melun, France, on December 12, 1942, and was repaired by Luftwaffe ground staff. It gained a USAAF nickname, "Wulfe Hound"

On 27 June 1944, a B-17 of KG 200, with Luftwaffe Geschwaderkennung code A3+FB, landed in Manises airport (Valencia) and was interned by the Spanish government.

=== Parachute troops ===
In July 1944 para-trained commandos of II./KG 200 carried out a parachute assault in July 1944 against French partisan forces on the Vercors Massif plateau in the French Alps where hundreds of partisans had created a stronghold from which they were mounting operations against the German occupiers.

These para-trained commandos of II./KG 200 remain a little-known arm of Germany's World War II parachute forces and were listed on II./KG 200's ORBAT (Order of Battle) as the 3rd Staffel. It is possible the paratroopers were actually Waffen SS paratroopers from the 500th SS Parachute Battalion assigned to Kampfgeschwader 200 for this particular mission.

=== KG 200 in the Middle East ===
In July 1942, and again in the winter of 1943-44, the short-lived Operations Dora and Bunny-Hop took place in the Gulf of Sirte, Libya, with secret bases inland at Al Mukaram and Wadi Tamet, as well as at Shott al Jerid behind the Mareth Line. The aim was to establish weather stations to provide local and meteorological intelligence, and to ferry agents via French West Africa to Cairo, Freetown and Durban. These used a (long range) Messerschmitt Bf 108, two Heinkel He 111s, and a captured B-17 - given the fictional designation "Dornier Do 288" (as a "confusive reuse" of the 8-288 RLM airframe number for the Junkers Ju 288, a Bomber B design competitor) - which despite being badly damaged during a raid on Al Mukaram by a Sudan Defence Force detachment, managed to return to Athens for repair. (Note: The KG200.org site mentions "bases .. in the Algerian (sic) desert" - this appears to be an error - Kelly seems to make clear that KG 200 only operated in the Libyan desert.)

On the night of 27 November 1944, KG 200 pilots Braun and Pohl flew a Junkers Ju 290 transport from Vienna to a position just south of Mosul, Iraq, where they successfully air-dropped five Iraqi parachutists in bright moonlight. The Luftwaffe crew flew back to the island of Rhodes, still under German occupation. After dealing with engineering problems, they evacuated some thirty casualties from Rhodes, reaching Vienna two nights later.

== See also ==
- No. 100 Group RAF, Royal Air Force special duties group, engaged in electronic warfare and countermeasures
- No. 138 Squadron RAF, No. 161 Squadron RAF, Royal Air Force squadrons responsible for dropping agents in occupied Europe
- No. 1426 Flight RAF, RAF unit that flew captured German aircraft
- Zirkus Rosarius, German unit that test-flew captured Allied aircraft
- Ruse of war
