= Werner Baumbach =

German bomber pilot

- Born: 27 December 1916; Cloppenburg, Grand Duchy of Oldenburg, German Empire
- Died: 20 October 1953 (aged 36); La Plata, Argentina
- Military career
- Allegiance: Nazi Germany
- Branch: Luftwaffe
- Service years: 1936–45
- Rank: Oberst
- Commands: I./KG 30, KG 200
- Conflicts: World War II
- Awards: Knight's Cross of the Iron Cross with Oak Leaves and Swords
- Other work: Test pilot

Werner Baumbach (27 December 1916 – 20 October 1953) was a German bomber pilot during World War II. He commanded the secret bomber wing Kampfgeschwader 200 (KG 200) of the Luftwaffe, the air force of Nazi Germany. Baumbach received the Knight's Cross of the Iron Cross with Oak Leaves and Swords for the destruction of over 300,000 gross register tons (GRT) of Allied shipping.

== Career ==
Baumbach entered the Luftwaffe in 1936 and, after initial training at the 2nd Air Warfare School (Fliegerhorst Gatow), was trained as a bomber pilot. He was one of the first pilots to fly the Junkers Ju 88 bomber and flew various bombing missions with Kampfgeschwader 30 (KG 30). Based in Norway, on 19 April 1940, he bombed and damaged the French cruiser Émile Bertin off Åndalsnes, for which he was awarded the Iron Cross 1st Class.

In 1942, Baumbach was removed from active pilot duty and started working on new bomber designs; among others, he helped design the composite bomber system, Mistel. In 1944, he was placed in command of the newly formed Kampfgeschwader 200 (KG 200) and was in charge of all Luftwaffe special missions. Baumbach was promoted to Oberstleutnant on 15 November 1944 and was the acting General der Kampfflieger for two months.

In the last stages of the war, during the days of the Flensburg Government, Baumbach was placed in charge of the government air squadron.

After the war, Baumbach spent 6 months as a prisoner of war in British custody on charges of being a war criminal. It was decided that neither he nor any unit under his command had committed any violation of the Hague Convention, and he was released. He then assisted the Harvard University historian Bruce C. Hopper for a year with studies on the course of World War II, and Hopper suggested that Baumbach should write a book based on his experiences.

With Allied permission he moved with his family in spring 1948 to Argentina where he worked as a technical adviser for industrial firms. In 1949 he published Zu spät? Aufstieg und Untergang der deutschen Luftwaffe, which was translated into English as Broken Swastika: The Defeat of the Luftwaffe in 1960. He died in a plane crash on 20 October 1953 near Berazategui, while evaluating a British Lancaster bomber for the Argentine Air Force. He was interred in his hometown, Cloppenburg, Lower Saxony. The street "Werner-Baumbach-Straße" in Cloppenburg was named after him.

== Awards ==
- Front Flying Clasp of the Luftwaffe for Bomber Pilots in Gold with Pennant "200"
  - in Silver (22 March 1941)
  - in Gold (1942)
- Pilot/Observer Badge in Gold with Diamonds (14 July 1941)
- Iron Cross (1939)
  - 2nd Class (28 September 1939)
  - 1st Class (4 May 1940) (Note: According to Thomas on 3 May 1940.)
- Knight's Cross of the Iron Cross with Oak Leaves and Swords
  - Knight's Cross on 8 May 1940 as Leutnant and pilot in the 5./Kampfgeschwader 30
  - 20th Oak Leaves on 14 July 1941 as Oberleutnant and Staffelkapitän of the 1./Kampfgeschwader 30 (Note: According to Von Seemen as Staffelkapitän of the 5./Kampfgeschwader 30.)
  - 16th Swords on 17 August 1942 as Hauptmann and Gruppenkommandeur of the I./Kampfgeschwader 30 (Note: According to Scherzer on 16 August 1942. According to Von Seemen as Gruppenkommandeur of the I./Kampfgeschwader 30.)
- Order of Military Merit - Bulgaria

Military offices
Preceded by Oberst Heinz Heigl	Commander of Kampfgeschwader 200; 15 November 1944 – 6 March 1945	Succeeded by Major Adolf von Hernier
