= Operation Eisenhammer =

Planned military operation in World War II

Coordinates: 56.2881°N 43.9924°E

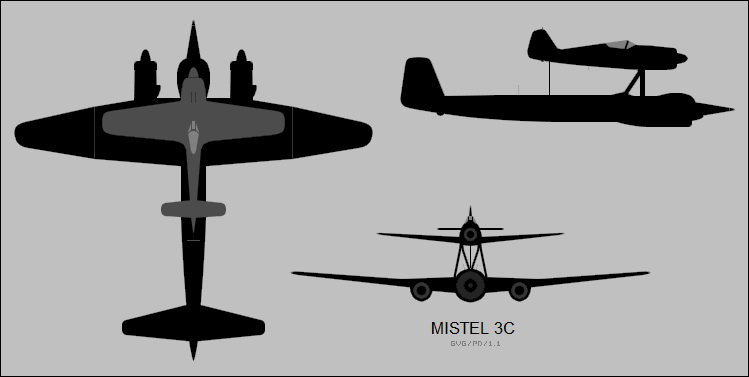
A Mistel combination of a Ju 88 and Fw 190

Operation Eisenhammer (German; in English Operation Iron Hammer) was a planned strategic bombing operation against power generators near Moscow and Gorky in the Soviet Union which was planned by Nazi Germany during World War II but eventually abandoned.

The plan of the operation was created in 1943 by Professor Heinrich Steinmann (1899–1969), an official at the Reich Air Ministry. A bombing raid was to destroy twelve turbines in water and steam power-plants near Moscow, Gorky, Tula, Stalinogorsk and under the Rybinsk Reservoir, as well as to attack certain substations, transmission lines and factories. If the attack were to succeed in destroying just two thirds of the turbines it would have knocked out about 75 percent of the power used by the Soviet defence industry. Only two smaller energy centers behind the Urals and in the Soviet Far East would have been left intact. At this time, the Soviet Union had no turbine manufacturing capabilities and the only repair facility (in Leningrad) had been heavily damaged.

To accomplish the goal Mistel long-range bombers were to be employed. To destroy water turbines, special floating mines called Sommerballon ("summer balloon") were to be dropped into the water and then pulled by the current straight into the turbines.

Due to the shortage of bombers and fuel, technical problems with the floating mine, and the Red Army overrunning advance bases, the plan was postponed repeatedly. In February 1945, however, Eisenhammer was resurrected, and Kampfgeschwader 200 assembled scout planes and about 100 Mistels near Berlin and waited for favourable weather to attack the plants around Moscow. After a US air raid on the primary Rechlin Erprobungstelle military aviation test headquarters facility, which destroyed 18 Mistels, the plan was postponed again and shortly afterwards finally dropped.

== Sources ==
- Von Rhoden Collection of Research Materials on the Role of the German Air Force in World War II lists captured German records about Operation Eisenhammer:online (PDF).
- James Lucas: Kommando: German Special Forces of World War Two, 2003, ISBN 978-0-7858-1681-2. The book provides a detailed account of the planning of the operation.
