= Arado E.377 =

Arado E.377a
- Type: Powered glide bomb
- Place of origin: Germany

Production history
- Designer: Arado and Rheinmetall-Borsig
- Designed: 1944
- Manufacturer: Arado Flugzeugwerke
- Produced: not produced

Specifications
- Mass: 10,000 kg (22,000 lb)
- Length: 10.9 m (36 ft)
- Wingspan: 12.2 m (40 ft)
- Warhead: Trialen 105 + incendiary liquid
- Warhead weight: 2,000 kg (4,400 lb) + 500 kg (1,100 lb)
- Engine: 2 x BMW 003; 8.81 kN (1,980 lbf)
- Propellant: Gasoline

The Arado E.377 was a glide bomb project with powered and non-powered variants designed by Arado Flugzeugwerke. The powered version was the E.377a intended for use with Heinkel He 162 Volksjäger under the Mistel V program and the unpowered version was the E.377 designed for the Arado Ar 234 under the Mistel VI program.

== Bibliography ==
- Forsyth, Robert (2020) [2001]. Mistel: German Composite Aircraft and Operations (Revised ed.). Crecy Publishing. ISBN 978-1-91080-981-5.
- Forsyth, Robert; Creek, Eddie J. (2008). Heinkel He 162 Volksjager: From Drawing Board to Destruction: The Volksjäger. Classic Publications. ISBN 978-1-90653-700-5.
- Sharp, Dan (2020). Heinkel He 162. Secret Projects of the Luftwaffe. Vol. 1. Tempest Books. ISBN 978-1-911658-24-5.
- Smith, J. Richard & Creek, Eddie J. (2022). Arado Ar 234 Blitz: The World's First Jet Bomber. Crecy Publishing. ISBN 978-1-90653-760-9.
