= Tirstrup =

- Village
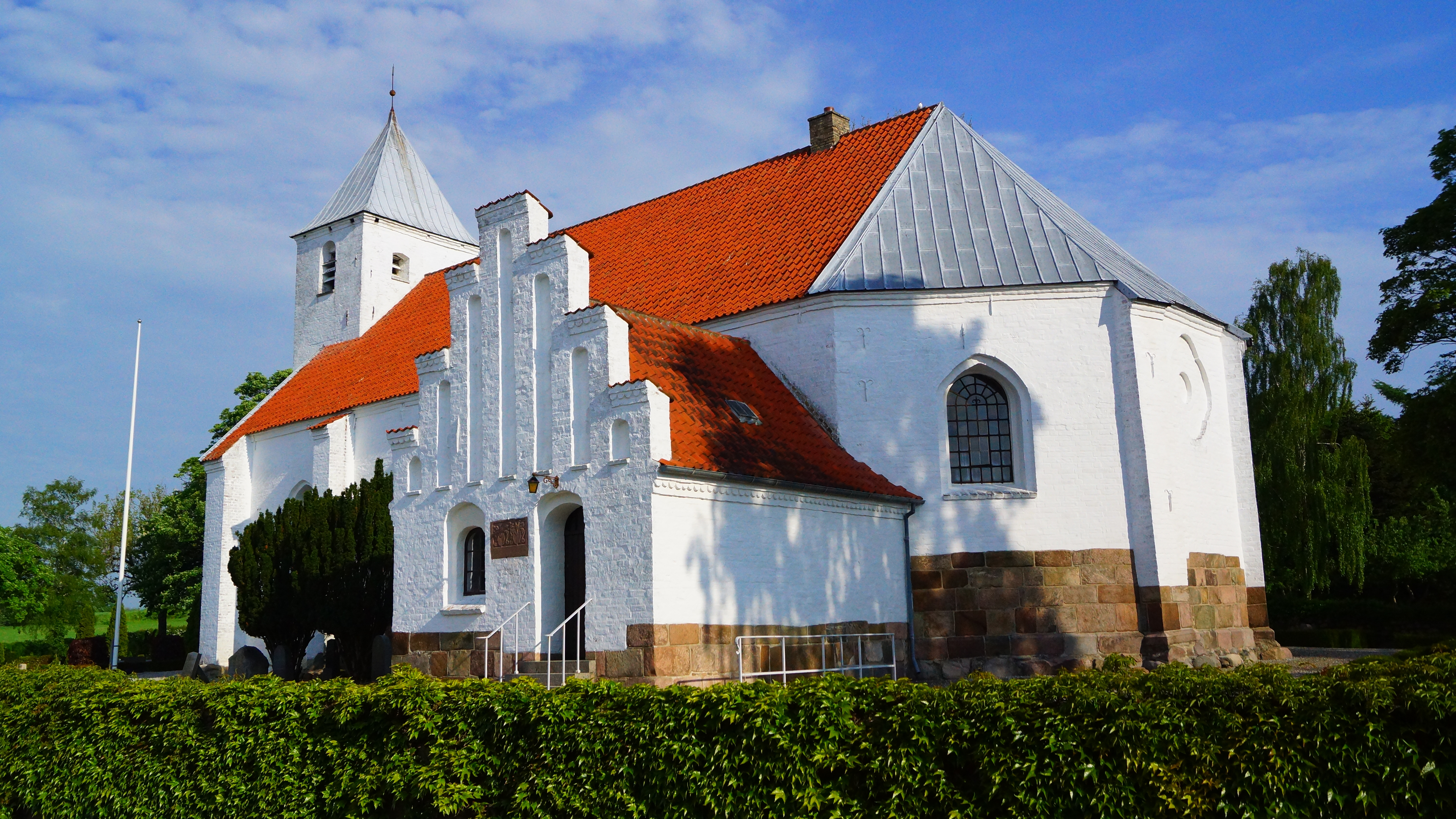
- Tirstrup Church

- Tirstrup within Denmark Tirstrup (Central Denmark Region)
- Coordinates: 56°18′N 10°41′E
- Country: Denmark
- Region: Central Denmark (Midtjylland)
- Municipality: Syddjurs

Population (2026)
  - Total: 425

Tirstrup is a village in East Jutland, Denmark. As of 1 January 2026, the village has a population of 425.

Tirstrup is located 44 kilometers from Aarhus and 18 kilometers from Grenaa. The village is a home to Aarhus Airport. Tirstrup lies in the Syddjurs Municipality and is governed as part of the Central Denmark Region (Region Midtjylland).
