= List of aircraft (Hf–Hz) =

This is a list of aircraft in alphabetical order beginning with 'Hf–Hz'.

== Hf–Hz ==
=== HFB ===
(Hamburger Flugzeugbau GmbH)

- HFB 209
- HFB 314
- HFB 320 Hansa Jet

=== HFL-Flugzeugbau ===
- HFL Stratos 300

=== Hickman ===
(Orville H Hickman, Minneapolis, MN)

- Hickman H-16
- Hickman H-20
- Hickman H-22
- Packmag Midget Seaplane

=== Hidde ===
(Leo A Hidde, Milwaukee, WI)

- Hidde LH-1

=== Higgins ===
((Andrew J & Frank O) Higgins Industries Inc, New Orleans, LA)

- Higgins EB-1 Rotorplane

=== Higgins ===
(J H Higgins, Bunkburnett, TX)

- Higgins H-2

=== Higley ===
(Clarence Higley, Cummings, KS)

- Higley Parasol

=== Higher Class Aviation ===
- Higher Class Aviation Sport Hornet

=== Hild-Marshonet ===
((Frederick C) Hild-(Edward F) Marshonet, Hempstead, NY)

- Hild-Marshonet 1911 Monoplane
- Hild-Marshonet 1912 Trainer
- Hild-Marshonet 1919 Biplane
- Hild-Marshonet 1920 Biplane

=== Hill ===
- Hummer

=== Hill ===
(Topeka, KS)

- Hill Tomcat

=== Hill ===
(John Hill, Enid, OK)

- Hill Tiny Hawk

=== Hill-Kemman ===
(Keith Hill and Roger Kemman)

- Hill-Kemman HK-1

=== Hillberg ===
(Hillberg Helicopters, Fountain Valley, CA)

- Hillberg Turbine Exec
- Hillberg EH1-01 RotorMouse
- Hillberg EH1-02 TandemMouse

=== Hiller ===
(Stanley Hiller (Sr), Alameda, CA)

- Hiller 1911 monoplane

=== Hiller ===
(1942: (Stanley) Hiller Industries, Berkeley, CA, 1944: United Helicopters Inc (Hiller & Henry J Kaiser), 625 El Camino Real, Palo Alto, CA, c.1952: Hiller Helicopters. 1961: Acquisition by Eltra Corp, a holding company. 1964: Fairchild-Hiller Corp. 1973: Hiller Aviation. 1984: Fairchild-Hiller assets sold to Rogerson Aircraft Corp as Rogerson-Hiller, Port Angeles, WA, 1994: Hiller Aircraft Corp, Newark, CA, established when Jeffrey Hiller (son of Stanley) led an investment consortium to repurchase the assets from Rogerson-Hiller Corp.)

- Hiller H-5
- Hiller OH-23 Raven
- Hiller YH-32 Hornet
- Hiller XH-44
- Hiller HO-1
- Hiller HO-5
- Hiller VJ-100 two-man VTOL jet-rocket aircraft
- Hiller HOE
- Hiller HTE
- Hiller ROE Rotorcycle
- Hiller VZ-1 Pawnee "Flying Platform"
- Hiller X-18
- Hiller 206
- Hiller Model 360 (UH-12)
- Hiller 360 (1981)
- Hiller autogyro
- Fairchild Hiller FH-227
- Fairchild Hiller FH-1100
- Hiller HJ-1 Hornet
- Hiller J-5
- Hiller HH-120 Hornet
- Hiller 1094 Camel
- Hiller Ten99
- Hiller UH-4 Commuter
- Hiller UH-5B Rotormatic
- Hiller UH-12
- Hiller VXT-8
- Hiller X-2-235
- Hiller CH-112 Nomad RCAF

=== Hillman ===
(Hillman Helicopters, Paso Robles, CA and Stellar Airpark, Chandler, AZ)

- Hillman Model 360
- Hillman Busy Bee
- Hillman Hornet
- Hillman Turbo Hornet
- Hillman Wankelbee

=== Hillson ===
(F.H. Hills & Sons)

- Hillson Praga
- Hillson Pennine
- Hillson Helvellyn
- Hillson Bi-mono
- Hillson F.H.40 'Slip-wing Hurricane

=== Hilton ===
(Hilton Aircraft Co, 621 W Douglas, Wichita, KS)

- Hilton & Brown 1000 (a.k.a. Hilton Super)

=== Hinchman ===
(Hinchman Aircraft Company)

- Hinchman H-1 Racer

=== Hindustan ===
(Hindustan Aeronautics Limited or HAL, India)

- HAL G-1
- HAL HT-2
- HAL HJT-16 Kiran
- HAL HJT-16 Kiran Mk II
- HAL HF-24 Marut
- HAL HUL-26 Pushpak
- HAL HAOP-27 Krishak
- HAL HAL-31 Basant
- HAL HA-31 Mk II Basant
- HAL HPT-32 Deepak
- HAL HTT-34
- HAL HJT-36 Sitara
- HAL HTT-40
- HAL Ardhra
- HAL Dhruv (ALH)
- HAL Tejas (LCA)
- HAL Ajeet
- HAL Ajeet Trainer
- HAL Lancer
- HAL Rudra
- HAL ALH-WSI
- HAL Light Utility Helicopter

=== Hinkler ===
- Hinkler Ibis

=== Hino ===
(Kumazo Hino)

- Hino No.1
- Hino No.2
- Hino No.3 Kai
- Hino No.4 Kamikaze-go

=== Hinz ===
(L and B Hinz, Filderstadt, Germany)

- Hinz BLT-ARA
- Hinz BL-1 Kea

=== Hipp's Superbirds ===
- Hipp's Superbirds J-3 Kitten
- Hipp's Superbirds J-4 Sportster
- Hipp's Superbirds J-5 Super Kitten
- Hipp's Superbirds Super Sportster
- Hipp's Superbirds Reliant
- Hipp's Superbirds Reliant SX

=== Hippsich ===
- Hippsich Monoplane

=== Hirosho ===
(Hiro Kaigun Kosho - Hiro Naval Arsenal)

- Hiro G2H
- Hiro H1H
- Hiro H2H
- Hiro H3H
- Hiro H4H
- Hiro H10H
- Hiro Navy Experimental 7-Shi Attack Bomber
- Hiro Navy Experimental 14-Shi Medium Flying-Boat
- Hiro Navy Type 15 Flying-Boat
- Hiro Navy Type 89 Flying-Boat
- Hiro Navy Type 90-1 Flying-Boat
- Hiro Navy Type 91 Flying-Boat
- Hiro Navy Type 91 Night Reconnaissance Flying Boat
- Hiro Navy Type 95 Twin-engined Land-based Attacker
- Hiro Navy F.5 Flying Boat
- Hiro Experimental R-3 Flying Boat

=== Hirsch ===
(Rene Hirsch – M.Aé.R.C. Moyens Aérodynamiques de Régulation et de Controle)

- Hirsch H-100

=== Hirt ===
(Hirt Aircraft Corp, Hemet, CA)

- Hirt MK-7
- Hirt Trio

=== Hirtenberg ===
- Hirtenberg HS.9
- Hirtenberg HS.10
- Hirtenberg HA.11
- Hirtenberg HAM.11
- Hirtenberg HV.12
- Hirtenberg HM.13
- Hirtenberg HH.15
- Hirtenberg HV.15
- Hirtenberg HS.16

=== Hirth ===
- Hirth Hi-20 MoSe
- Hirth Hi 27 Acrostar

=== Hise ===
((Fred H) Hise Aircraft Co, Gratiot Ave Airport, Detroit, MI)

- Hise Model A
- Hise Air Rambler C-2

=== Hispano ===
(Sociedad la Hispano / Hispano Aviación)

- Hispano-Barrón
- Hispano E-30
- Hispano E-34
- Hispano HS-34
- Hispano HS-42
- Hispano HA-43
- Hispano HA-100-E1 Triana
- Hispano HA-110-C1
- Hispano HA-200 Saeta
- Hispano HA-220 Super Saeta
- Hispano HA-231-R1 Guión
- Hispano HA-300
- Hispano HA-1109-J1L
- Hispano HA-1109-K1L Tripala
- Hispano HA-1109-M1L
- Hispano HA-1110-K1L
- Hispano HA-1110-M1L
- Hispano HA-1111-K1L
- Hispano HA-1112-M1L Buchon
- Hispano HA-1112-M4L

=== Historical ===
(Historical Aircraft Corporation, Nucla, CO)

- Historical P-51 Mustang
- Historical F4U Corsair
- Historical P-40C Tomahawk
- Historical PZL P.11c
- Historical Ryan STA

=== Hitachi ===
- Hitachi TR.1
- Hitachi T.2

=== Hatfield Man Powered Aircraft Club (HMPAC) ===
- Hatfield Puffin
- Hatfield Puffin II

=== Hobbycopter ===
(Adams-Wilson Helicopters Inc, Lakewood, CA)

- Hobbycopter 101 (a.k.a. XH-1)
- Hobbycopter 102

=== Hochart ===
- Hochart S2

=== Hockaday ===
((Noel R) Hockaday Aircraft Corp, Burbank, CA)

- Hockaday Noelcraft
- Hockaday CF-130 Comet

=== Hocke ===
- Hocke experimental biplane

=== Hocker-Denien ===
(A Hocker, Evansville, IN; 1961: Ralph R Denien, Indianapolis, IN)

- Hocker-Denien Sparrow Hawk

=== Hodek ===
- Hodek HK-101

=== Hodgdon ===
(L M (and T A?) Hodgdon, Detroit, MI)

- Hodgdon Ascender
- Hodgdon Chummy

=== Hodgson ===
(Edward R Hodgson IV, 125 S Millodge, Athens, GA)

- Hodgson Red Star

=== Hodkinson ===
(Valley Mfg Div, (W W) Hodkinson Aircraft Corp, Glendale, CA)

- Hodkinson HT-1

=== Hoefelman ===
(Charles D Hoefelman, Mineral Wells, TX)

- Hoefelman CH-1 Schatzie

=== Hoff ===
(Joseph Hoff, CA)

- Hoff 1921 Biplane

=== Hoff ===
(C D Hoff, Chicago, IL)

- Hoff Cabin

=== Hoffman ===
(Raoul J Hoffman, St Petersburg, FL)

- Hoffman Flying Wing

=== Hoffman ===
(Edward C Hoffman, St Petersburg, FL)

- Hoffman X-1 Sweet Patootie
- Hoffman X-2 Orphan Annie
- Hoffman X-3 The Girl Friend
- Hoffman X-4 Mullet Skiff

=== Hoffmann ===
(Wolf Hoffmann)

- Hoffmann H36 Dimona
- Hoffmann H38 Observer
- Hoffmann H40
- Hoffmann Visionar

=== Hogan-Moyer ===
((Robert J) Hogan-(Jarrett G) Moyer Aircraft Corp, 226 Wolf St, Syracuse, NY)

- Hogan-Moyer Homer

=== Hogdon ===
(L M & T A Hogdon, Detroit, MI)

- Hogdon Ascender
- Hogdon Chummy

=== Hogue ===
(Alton H Hogue, Boulder, CO)

- Hogue H-100

=== Holbrook ===
((Arthur Erritt) Holbrook Helicopter Aeroplane Co (Pres: L B Durnil), Joplin, MO)

- Holbrook 1910 Helicopter

=== Holcomb ===
(Jerry Holcomb, Vancouver, WA)

- Holcomb Perigee

=== Holeka ===
(W J Holeka, Sacramento, CA)

- Holeka Type Z

=== Holl ===
(Fred T Holl, Parkesburg, PA)

- Holl 1920 Biplane

=== Hollaender ===
(Arne Hollaender, Aare, Jutland)

- Hollaender A.H.1

=== Hollandair ===
- Hollandair HA-001 Libel

=== Hollandsche Vliegtuigenfabriek ===
- Hollandsche Vliegtuigenfabriek Avia

=== Holle ===
(A.A. Holle)

- Holle Varioplane

=== Holleville ===
(Roger Holleville)

- Holleville RH.1 Bambi

=== Hollman ===
(Winther-Hollman Aircraft Inc, Cupertino, CA)

- Hollman Condor
- Hollman HA-2M Sportster

=== Holloway & Wallace ===
(H H Holloway & A J Wallace, Los Angeles, CA)

- Holloway & Wallace HB-2

=== Hollsmidt ===
- Hollsmidt 222
- Hollsmidt HT-1

=== Holman ===
(C B and Clarence T Holman, Rawlins, WY)

- Holman 1930 Monoplane

=== Honda ===
(Honda Motor Co, Greensboro, NC)

- Honda MH01
- Honda MH02
- Honda HA-420 HondaJet

=== Honey ===
(Ray Honey, Bourbonnais, IL)

- Honey Li'L Honey

=== Hongdu ===
- Hongdu GJ-11
- Hongdu JL-8
- Hongdu JL-10
- Hongdu L-15
- Hongdu N-5
- Hongdu Yakovlev CJ-7

=== Hønningstad ===
- Hønningstad Norge A (1938)
- Hønningstad Norge B (1946)
- Hønningstad Norge C (1960)
- Hønningstad C.5 Polar (a.k.a. Norge)
- Norsk Flyindustri C.5 Polar (1948)
- Norsk Flyindustri Finnmark 5A (1949)
- Hønningstad 5A Finnmark

=== Honroth ===
(Edward Honroth)

- Honroth Special

=== Höntsch ===
(Gerhard Winkler / Johannes Höntsch / Flugsportgruppe Schönhagen)

- Höntsch FSS 100 Tourist

=== Hooten ===
((Orval M) Hooten Aircraft Co, Springfield, IL)

- Hooten HT-1

=== Hoover ===
(David Hoover)

- Hoover AR-6 (Arnold AR-6)

=== Hopfner ===
(Flugzeugbau Hopfner GmbH)

- Hopfner S.1
- Hopfner HV-2
- Hopfner HV-3/27
- Hopfner HV-4/28
- Hopfner HS-5/28
- Hopfner HV-6/28
- Hopfner HS-8/28
- Hopfner HS-8/29
- Hopfner HS-9/32
- Hopfner HS-9/35
- Hopfner HS-10/32
- Hopfner HS-10/33
- Hopfner HS-10/35
- Hopfner HA-11/33
- Hopfner HV-12/34
- Hopfner-Hirtenberger HM.13/34
- Hopfner HR-14/34
- Hopfner HV 15

=== Hopkins ===
(Robert S Hopkins, Reidsville, NC)

- Hopkins Falcon 1

=== Hopkins & Meade ===
(W F Hopkins & T A Meade, San Diego, CA)

- Hopkins & Meade Sport

=== Hopper ===
(Bruce Hopper, Dallas, TX)

- Hopper Grasshopper

=== Hoppi-copter ===
(1945: Hoppi-copters Inc (Fdr: Horace T Pentecost), Boeing Field, Seattle, WA, 1954: Capital Helicopter Corp.)

- Hoppi-copter 101
- Hoppi-copter 102
- Hoppi-copter Firefly

=== Hordern-Richmond ===
(Hordern-Richmond aircraft Ltd.)

- Hordern-Richmond Autoplane

=== Horn ===
(Mark V Horn, West Palm Beach, FL)

- Horn Li'L Trouble

=== Horten ===
- Horten H.I
- Horten H.Ib
- Horten H.II
- Horten H.III
- Horten H.IV
- Horten H.V
- Horten H.VI
- Horten H.VII
- Horten H.VIII
- Horten H.IX
- Horten H.X
- Horten H.XI
- Horten H.XIII
- Horten H.XIV
- Horten H.XV
- Horten H.XVa
- Horten H.XVb
- Horten H.XVc
- Horten H.XVI
- Horten H.XVIII
- Horten Parabola
- Horten Ho 226 H.VII; later 8-254; number 8-226 transferred to Focke-Wulf
- Horten Ho 229 H.IX
- Horten Ho 250 H.III
- Horten Ho 251 H.IVc
- Horten Ho 252 H.V
- Horten Ho 253 H.VI
- Horten Ho 254 H.VII; originally numbered 8-226
- Horten Ho 267 Horten Twin-turbojet all-wing aircraft; possibly identical or related to Ho/Go 229 and/or Go 267

=== Horten ===
(Horten Aircraft GmbH)

- Horten Aircraft HX-2

=== Horton ===
(William E Horton, Santa Ana, CA)

- Horton Wingless

=== Horváth ===
(Ernő Horváth)

- Horváth III 1911 monoplane

=== Hoshino ===
(Yonezo Hoshino)

- Hoshino 1914 Aeroplane

=== Hosler ===
(Russell A "Curly" Hosler, Huntington, IN)

- Hosler C&G Special
- Hosler Fury

=== Houde ===
(Patrice Houde, Reichshoffen, France)

- Houde Bimax
- Houde Speedmax

=== Houstee ===
(Richard & Katherine Houstee, Memphis, TN)

- Houstee Blackhawk

=== Hovey ===
(Robert W. Hovey)

- Hovey Whing Ding
- Hovey Whing Ding II
- Hovey Beta Bird
- Hovey Delta Bird
- Hovey Delta Hawk
- Hovey Super Delta Hawk

=== Howard ===
(Howard aircraft Corporation)

- Howard C-70 Nightingale
- Howard DGA-1
- Howard DGA-2
- Howard DGA-3 Pete
- Howard DGA-4 Mike, Ike and "Miss Chevrolet"
- Howard DGA-5 orig. Lincoln Playboy later Mike
- Howard DGA-6 Mr. Mulligan
- Howard DGA-7
- Howard DGA-8
- Howard DGA-9
- Howard DGA-11
- Howard DGA-12
- Howard DGA-15
- Howard DGA-18
- Howard Flyabout
- Howard GH
- Howard NH

=== Howard ===
((D U) Howard Aero Inc, San Antonio, TX, 1963: Acquired by Alamo Aero Service as Howard Aero Mfg Co, Div of Business Aircraft Corp.)

- Howard 250
- Howard 350
- Howard 500
- Howard Eldorado 700
- Howard Super Ventura
- Howard Tri-motor Travel Air (Tri-motor Travel Air conv.)

=== Howard Wright ===
- Howard Wright 1909 Monoplane
- Howard Wright 1910 Monoplane

=== Howell ===
(Tyler Howell, Jonesville, MI)

- Howell S

=== Howell ===
(Phil Howell, Christiansburg, VA)

- Howell-Mignet HM-293 Himmelslaus

=== Howell-Lutzky ===
(W T Howell & Victor Lutzky, Detroit, MI)

- Howell-Lutzky 1936 Monoplane

=== Howland ===
(Howland Aero Design, DeBary, FL)

- Howland H-2 Honey Bee
- Howland H-3 Pegasus
- Howland HP-40 Warhawk

=== Hoyle ===
- Hoyle Skyraider

=== Hoynik ===
(Steve W Hoynik, Milwaukee, WI)

- Hoynik Butch BA-11

=== HPK ===
(HPK Aircraft Associates (Harold Hayden, Art Payne, and Robert Kinney of Engle Flying Service), Delaware Valley, PA)

- HPK SP-1

=== Hruby ===
(J Hruby, Riverwoods, IL)

- Hruby Cayuse

=== HTM ===
(Helikopter Technik München)

- HTM Skytrac
- HTM Skyrider

=== Huabei ===
(Huabei Machinery Factory)

- Huabei-5
- Huabei-6

=== Hubertec ===
(Aach, Rhineland-Palatinate, Germany)

- Hubertec Thermik

=== Hübner ===
( Dr. Hugo Hübner)

- Hübner Mücke
- Hübner 1911 biplane
- Hübner 1911 monoplane
- Hübner 1912 floatplane
- Hübner Eindecker IV 1912

=== Huc-Raynaud-Guiraud ===
(Alfred Huc – André Raynaud – Charles Guiraud)

- Huc-Raynaud-Guiraud Lou Riatou

=== Hudson ===
(Sandy Hudson Jr, Black Mountain, NC)

- Hudson 2-2-E Thing
- Hudson Trimotor

=== Hudson ===
(Sanders V Hudson & William B Harris, Black Mountain, NC)

- Hudson 32 (a.k.a. Harris & Hudson Longster)

=== Hudson & O'Brien ===
(John W. Hudson & Clifton O'Brien, San Francisco, CA)

- Hudson & O'Brien 1909 Monoplane
- Hudson & O'Brien 1910 Biplane

=== Huey-Bulmer ===
(R V Huey and John W Bulmer, Valley Center, KS)

- Huey-BulmerBuluey Sport H-2

=== Huff-Daland ===
(Huff-Daland Airplane Co, Bristol, PA)

- Huff-Daland AT-1
- Huff-Daland AT-2
- Huff-Daland B-1
- Huff-Daland HB-1
- Huff-Daland HN
- Huff-Daland HO
- Huff-Daland LB-1
- Huff-Daland LB-3
- Huff-Daland LB-5
- Huff-Daland TA-2
- Huff-Daland TA-6
- Huff-Daland TW-5
- Huff-Daland D-49
- Huff-Daland Duster
- Huff-Daland HD-1 Early Bird
- Huff-Daland HD-4 Bridget
- Huff-Daland HD-5 Petrel
- Huff-Daland HD-7 Dizzy Dog
- Huff-Daland HD-8 Plover
- Huff-Daland HD-8A Petrel 1
- Huff-Daland HD-8A Petrel 4
- Huff-Daland HD-8A Petrel 5
- Huff-Daland HD-9A
- Huff-Daland HD-9L
- Huff-Daland HD-22
- Huff-Daland Pelican
- Huff-Daland Petrel 31
- Huff-Daland TW-8 (Company designation)

=== Hüffer ===
(Flugzeugbau Julius Hüffer)

- Hüffer Hb 28b
- Hüffer HK 39
- DLFW-B.I
- DLFW-B
- DLFW-W.I
- Hüffer HE 1
- Hüffer HS 3
- Hüffer H 9

=== Huffman ===
(Glen Huffman Aircraft Co, Detroit, MI)

- Huffman 1928 Biplane

=== Hughes ===
(C A Hughes Jr, Elon College, NC)

- Hughes Dixie special

=== Hughes ===
(George Andrew Hughes, 1507 Garfield St (dba King of Flight Aircraft Co, 3830 Touzalin Ave), Lincoln, NE)

- Hughes 1893

=== Hughes Aircraft, Hughes Helicopters ===
(1934: (Howard R) Hughes Development Co, Glendale, CA, 1936: Hughes Aircraft Div, Hughes Tool Co, Culver City, Burbank, CA, 1948: Aircraft Div, Hughes Tool Co. 1972: Hughes Helicopters Div, Summa Corp. 1984: Helicopter Div acquired by McDonnell-Douglas.)

- Hughes A-37
- Hughes F-11
- Hughes OH-6 Cayuse
- Hughes H-17 Sky Crane
- Hughes H-28
- Hughes TH-55 Osage
- Hughes AH-64 Apache
- Hughes HO-2
- Hughes HO-6
- Hughes P-73
- Hughes R-11
- Hughes V-9
- Hughes 77 Apache
- Hughes 200
- Hughes 300
- Hughes 500
- Hughes 530F
- Hughes D-2
- Hughes H-1 Special
- Hughes H-4 Hercules
- Hughes Model 269
- Hughes Model 369
- Hughes Model 385
- Hughes Model H-356
- Hughes XF-11

=== Hughes ===
- Australian Lightwing GR 532
- Australian Lightwing GR 582
- Australian Lightwing GR 912
- Australian Lightwing SP-2000 Speed
- Australian Lightwing SP-4000 Speed
- Australian Lightwing SP-6000
- Hughes Lightwing R55
- Hughes Lightwing Aeropower 28

=== Hugo ===
(Adolph B Hugo, Tulsa, OK)

- Hugo Hu-Go Craft

=== Hulbert ===
(Dane Hulbert)

- Hulbert 1910 Biplane

=== Humber ===
(designed by Hubert Le Blon)

- Humber monoplane

=== Humbert Aviation ===
(Jean-Jacques Humbert)

- Humbert Tetras
- Humbert La Moto Du Ciel

=== Hummel ===
((J Morry) Hummel Aviation, Bryan, OH)

- Hummel Bird
- Hummel H5
- Hummel Ultracruiser
- Hummel Ultracruiser Plus

=== Hungaro Copter ===
(Hungaro Copter Limited)

- Hungaro Copter

=== Hunt ===
(A E Hunt, Jetmore, KS)

- Hunt 1910 Helicopter

=== Hunt ===
(Bill Hunt, Moneta, Los Angeles, CA)

- Hunt Racer
- Hunt Special

=== Hunt ===
((Henry) Hunt Aircraft Mfg Co, Fiskeville, RI)

- Hunt Chummy
- Hunt Special

=== Hunt ===
(John Hunt, Govilon, United Kingdom)

- Huntwing

=== Hunt-Rettig ===
(Ralph V Hunt & William Rettig, Kansas City, MO)

- Hunt-Rettig Special

=== Hunter ===
(Charles Hunter, Chicago, IL)

- Hunter SA-3

=== Hunting Aircraft ===
- Hunting H.107 30-seat jet airliner project, evolved into the BAC One-Eleven
- Hunting H.126

=== Hunting-Percival ===
- Hunting-Percival P.56 Provost
- Hunting-Percival P.66 Pembroke
- Hunting-Percival P.66 President
- Hunting-Percival P.66 Sea Prince
- Hunting-Percival P.66 Prince
- Hunting Percival P.74
- Hunting-Percival P.84 Jet Provost

=== Huntington ===
((Howard) Huntington Aircraft Co Inc, New York, NY)

- Huntington 1914 Multiplane
- Huntington 1915 Biplane
- Huntington 1917 Biplane
- Huntington HD-11
- Huntington H-11 Governor
- Huntington H-11K Governor
- Huntington HD-12 Chum (a.k.a. H-12)

=== Huntington ===
(Huntington Airplane Co, Huntington, WV)

- Huntington 1920 Biplane

=== Hunt ===
(John Hunt)

- Huntwing

=== Hurd ===
(E P Hurd Co, Aeronautic Div, 5820 Fischer Ave, Detroit, MI)

- Hurd 1928 Monoplane
- Hurd HM-1

=== Hurel-Dubois ===
(Avions Hurel-Dubois)

- Hurel-Dubois HD.10
- Hurel-Dubois HD.31
- Hurel-Dubois HD.32
- Hurel-Dubois HD.321
- Hurel-Dubois HD.324
- Hurel-Dubois HD.33
- Hurel-Dubois HD.331
- Hurel-Dubois HD.34
- Hurel-Dubois HD.35
- Hurel-Dubois HD.37

=== Hürkus ===
(Vecihi Hürkus)

- Vecihi K-VI
- Vecihi XIV
- Vecihi XV
- Vecihi XIVD
- Vecihi XVI
- Vecihi XVID
- Vecihi K-XVII

=== Hurlburt ===
(Mildred Caldwell, Margaret Hurlburt, Anna Logan, Cleveland, OH)

- Hurlburt Hurricane (a.k.a. Camburt Special)

=== Hurry ===
(LeRoy Hurry)

- Hurry J-1 Sport

=== Hurst ===
((J W) Hurst Aeroplane & Motor Co (Pres: I J O'Malley), Terre Haute, IN)

- Hurst Papillon

=== Husk ===
(Bill Husk, Dublin, GA)

- Husk The Clip

=== Husky ===
(Caribbean Traders Inc, Miami, FL)

- Husky I
- Husky II
- Husky III
- Husky Bush Plane

=== Hussey ===
(J.G.H. Hussey, Calgary Alberta, Canada)

- Hussey Skyhawk 101

=== Hutchinson ===
(Hutchinson Aircraft Co, Bay St Louis, MS)

- Hutchinson AGMaster

=== Hütter ===
(Ulrich Hütter and Wolfgang Hütter)

- Hütter Hü 17
- Hütter Hü 28
- Hütter Hü 136
- Hütter Hu 211

=== Hy-Tek Hurricane ===
- Hy-Tek Hurricane 103
