= Hopfner =

Hopfner (alternatively spelled Höpfner or Hoepfner) may refer to:

== People ==
- Elyse Hopfner-Hibbs (a.k.a. Elyse Null; born 1989), Canadian gymnast and YouTube personality
- Ernst Höpfner (1836–1915), German educator, philologist, and journal founder
- Friedrich Hopfner (1881–1949), Austrian geodesist, geophysicist, and planetary scientist
- Heiner Hopfner (1941–2014), German operatic singer and singing teacher
- Hermann Höpfner (born 1945), German gymnast and Olympics competitor
- Karl Hopfner (born 1952), German football executive
- Matthias Höpfner (born 1975), German bobsledder and Olympics competitor
- Michael Hopfner (1947–2009), Canadian hotel owner, electrical contractor, politician, and fraudster
- Oswald Hoepfner (1872–1957), American sculptor
- Richard Hoepfner (born 1944), American sailor and Olympic medalist
- Ute Höpfner (born 1976), German sailor and Olympics competitor
- Wolfram Hoepfner (born 1937), German classicist, archaeologist, architectural historian, and professor

== Aircraft ==
- Hopfner (aircraft manufacturer), Austrian aircraft manufacturer
  - Hopfner HA-11/33
  - Hopfner HS-5/28
  - Hopfner HS-8/29
  - Hopfner HS-9/32 (a.k.a. Hirtenberg HS.9)
  - Hopfner HS-10/32
  - Hopfner HV-3/27
  - Hopfner HV-4/28
  - Hopfner HV 15 (a.k.a. Hirtenberg HV.15)
  - Hopfner HV-6/28

== See also ==
- Hopfer (disambiguation), a similarly spelled surname
