= 6.28 =

6.28 may refer to:

- An approximation of tau, the circle constant equal to 2π (6.283185307179586...)
- June 28, represented in the American date format as 6/28
- Hopfner HV-6/28, a small airliner built in the late 1920s
- Matthew 6:28, a Bible verse
