= Wagner Aerocar =

Type of aircraft

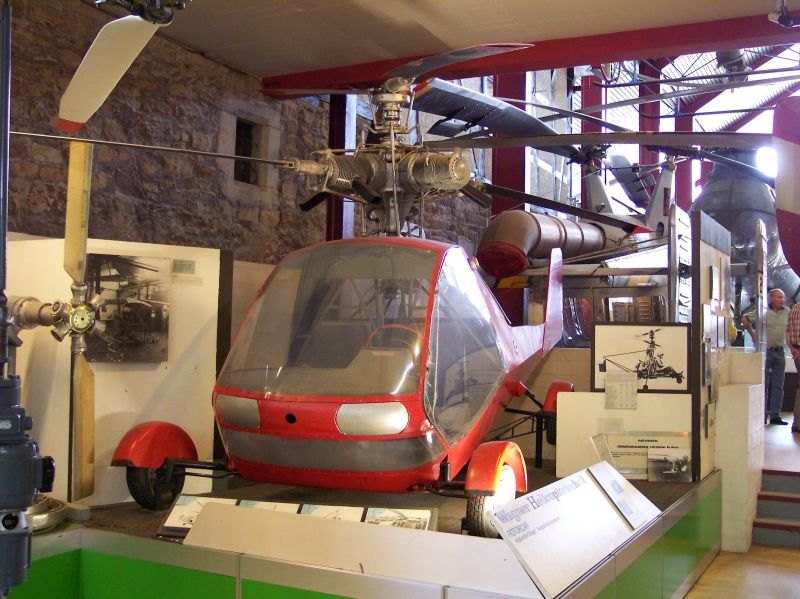

General information
- National origin: Germany
- Manufacturer: Wagner
- Designer: Alfred Vogt

History
- Introduction date: 1965
- First flight: 1965
- Developed from: HTM Skytrac
- Variant: HTM Skytrac

The Wagner FJ-V3 Aerocar was a prototype 4-place flying automobile. The vehicle used contra-rotating rotor helicopter technology for flight.

== Design ==
The Aerocar was developed in the era of space-age futurism, and looked the part. It looked slightly like the Jetsons flying car, with a large bubble cockpit, tailfins, and disproportionately small wheels for a car. It was developed from the Rotocar III design which was based on the Sky-trac 3 helicopter. The helicopter used counter-rotating rotors. On ground propulsion to the wheels was through a hydraulic linkage to the engine.

== Operational history ==
A prototype with the registration D-HAGU was completed and flown in 1965. The Franklin 6AS-335-B engine was replaced with a 134lb, 420shp Turbomeca Oredon turbine engine with a front-mounted gearbox. The design was sold to Helikopter Technik München (HTM). HTM suspended development of the Aerocar in 1971.

== Variants ==
- HTM Skytrac

== Specifications Wagner Aerocar ==
General characteristics

- Capacity: 4
- Powerplant: 1 × Franklin , 190 kW (260 hp)

Performance
