= Wilhelm Gustloff Stiftung =

German foundation

The Wilhelm Gustloff Stiftung (Wilhelm Gustloff Foundation) was a state-owned trust set up by the government of Nazi Germany in 1933. Named after Wilhelm Gustloff, a leader of the Nazi Party's Swiss branch who was later assassinated, it was funded by money and property confiscated from German Jews. It was disbanded like all other Nazi organizations in 1945, after the fall of Nazi Germany.

== Overview ==
The Foundation ran the Gustloff Werke ("Gustloff Factories"), a group of businesses confiscated from their Jewish owners or partners. By 1938 it had been organized into five major branches.

=== Factories ===
Gustloff Werk Weimar was formerly Bautzener Waggon- und Maschinenfabrik AG, a branch of Simson & Co. Suhl and was situated in Weimar, Thüringen. The company originally made wagons and tools. Under the new management it expanded into making ammunition crates, ammunition trailers, light infantry mortars (50mm caliber), anti-tank artillery (50mm, 75mm and 88mm caliber), anti-aircraft cannon (20mm caliber), military vehicles, and machine tools. It also assembled complete Kar98 Mauser rifles from component parts made by Gustloff Werk Suhl and subcontractors from Thuringia and Saxony (called the Sachsengruppe, or "Saxon Group"). It was renamed Gustloff Werk Weimar (Fritz Sauckel Werk) after Fritz Sauckel, the Gauleiter and Reichsregent of Thüringen. Originally employing German laborers, wartime manpower demands allowed them to be replaced with forced and slave laborers. It ran Gustloff-Werke II, a satellite camp of Buchenwald concentration camp that used slave labor to make G43 self-loading rifles.

Gustloff Werk Suhl, or Waffenfabrik Suhl, was formerly Simson & Co. Suhl, located in Suhl, Thuringen. They made small arms, motorcycles, and bicycles and were the official arms manufacturer for the Weimar Republic. It was confiscated from the Simson family in 1936. In 1939 rifle production was shifted to Gustloff Werk Weimar so Waffenfabrik Suhl could concentrate on MG34 and MG42 machinegun production. All finished rifle parts and components were sold to the Army, who sent them to supply depots as spares.

Gustloff Werk Hirtenberg (also known as Otto Eberhardt Patronenfabrik) was located in Hirtenberg, Austria. It was a cartridge manufacturer. The Nazi Party invested heavily in modernizing and expanding its facilities.

Gustloff Werk Meuselwitz or Maschinenfabrik Meuselwitz was formerly Heymer & Pilz GmbH Maschinenfabriken situated in Meuselwitz, Thuringen, Germany. It was a machine tool maker that had been founded in 1910 and was confiscated in 1939.

Thüringen-Haus, previously Zweigniederlassung (German > "Branch Office"), was situated in Berlin. This was the foreign sales office.
