= Darwin Aviation Museum =

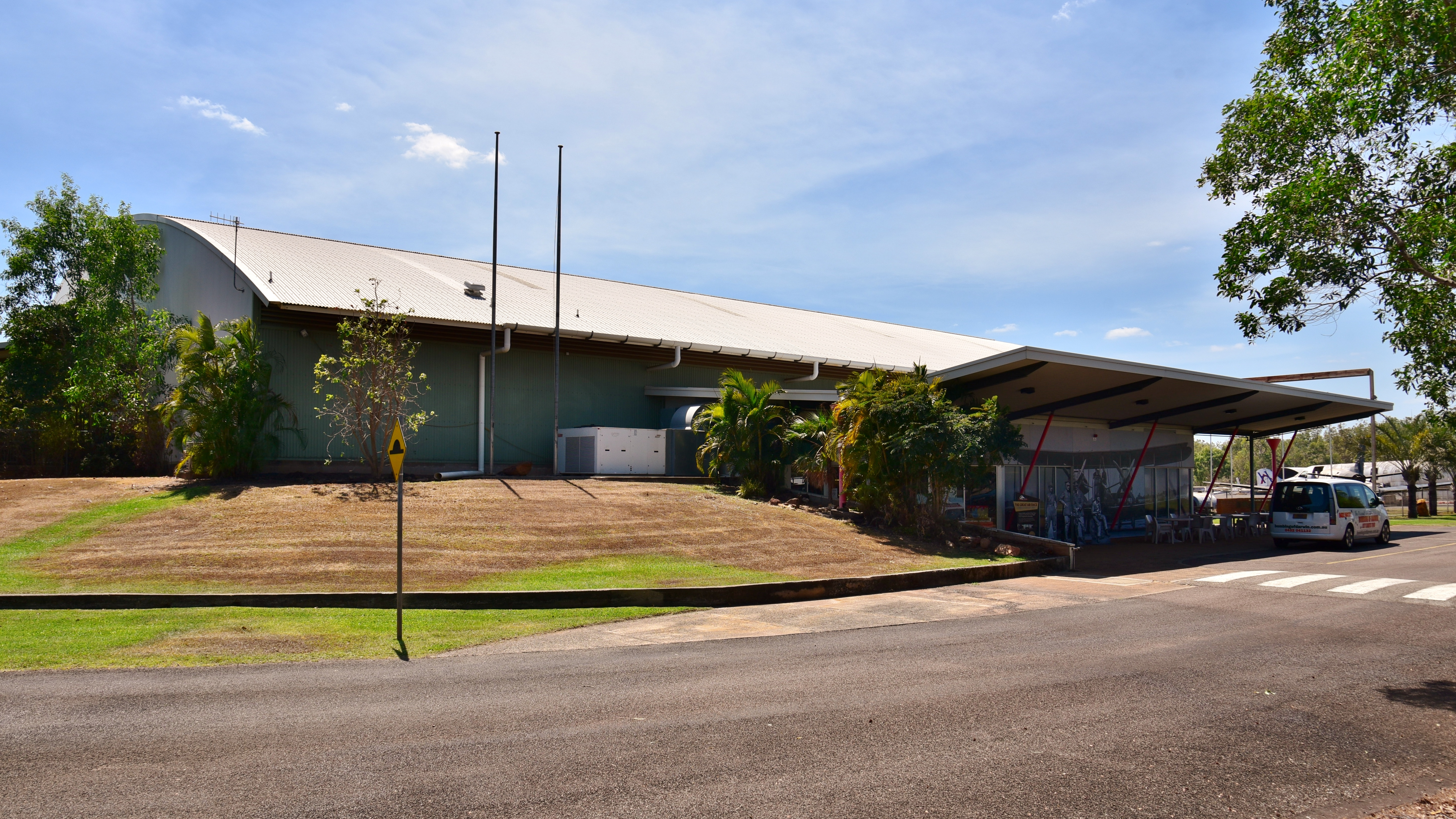
- Darwin Aviation Museum
- Former name: Australian Aviation Heritage Centre
- Established: 1988
- Location: 557 Stuart Highway, Winnellie, Northern Territory
- Coordinates: 12°25′31″S 130°53′45″E
- Type: Aerospace museum
- Website: www.darwinaviationmuseum.com.au

The Darwin Aviation Museum, previously known as the Australian Aviation Heritage Centre, displays aircraft and aircraft engines of relevance to the Northern Territory and aviation in Australia generally. It is located in the Darwin suburb of Winnellie.

== History ==
The museum's origins can be traced to 1976 when a group of enthusiasts sought to preserve aviation relics after the destruction of Cyclone Tracy. It was later broadened to include the documentation of World War II aircraft crash sites and the preservation of aviation relics related to the defence of Darwin during World War II. The museum was first opened to the public in 1988. In the late 1980s, the Society negotiated with the United States Air Force (USAF) and the Northern Territory Government to obtain a surplus USAF Boeing B-52 Stratofortress bomber and to build a museum to house and display the aircraft.

In June 1990, the new Darwin Aviation Museum opened. In 2011, the museum was considered as a display location for one of two Mi-24s confiscated by the Department of Defence in 1997. Due to the presence of asbestos in the airframes, the proposal was dropped. In 2018, the museum acquired a P-3C and looked into expanding their hangar space to house it.

== Collection ==
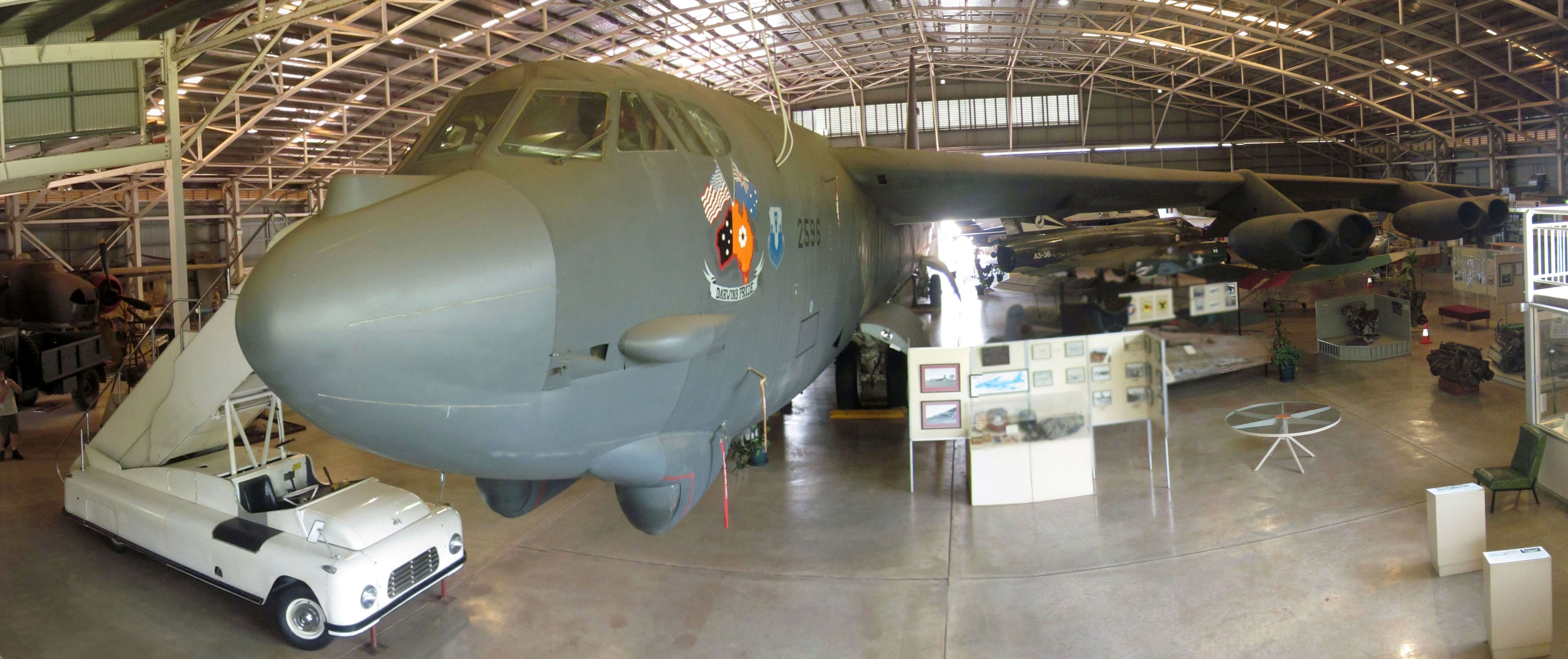
Boeing B-52G bomber on display at the Darwin Aviation Museum

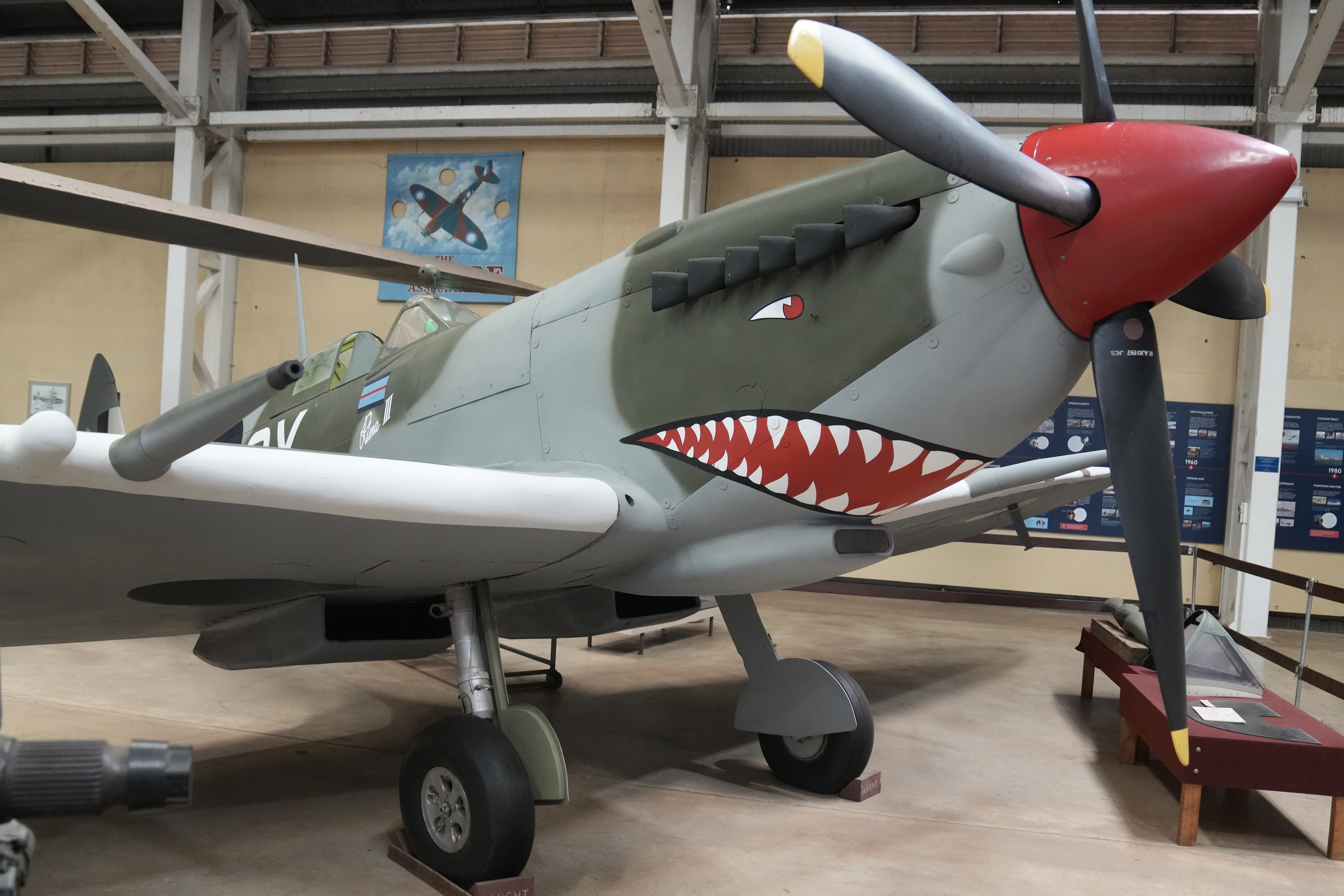
Supermarine Spitfire Mk VIII (Replica)

The museum has on display a Boeing B-52G bomber. It is on permanent loan from the United States Air Force and is one of only three on public display in the world outside the US. There is a bomb fragment dating from a WWII air raid on Darwin.

=== Aircraft on display ===
- Auster J/5P Autocar 3178
- Boeing B-52G Stratofortress 59-2596 "Darwin's Pride"
- CAC Sabre A94-914/A94-921
- Bell AH-1G Cobra 71-21018
- Dassault Mirage IIIO A3-36
- de Havilland DH.82 Tiger Moth A17-4
- de Havilland Dove 1B 4373
- General Dynamics F-111C A8-113
- Hovey Delta Bird
- Mitsubishi MU-2B 37
- Mitsubishi A6M2 Model 21 Zero BII-124
- North American B-25D Mitchell 41-30222
- Rockwell Shrike Commander 500
- Rutan Long-EZ
- Supermarine Spitfire VIII – Replica
- Westland Wessex HAS.31B N7-202

=== Aircraft engines on display ===
- Allison J33
- Allison V-1710
- Bristol Centaurus
- Continental O-200
- de Havilland Gipsy Major II
- de Havilland Gipsy Six II
- de Havilland Gipsy Queen 30
- de Havilland Gipsy Queen 70-2
- Franklin 6V4
- Liberty L-12
- Nakajima Sakae 12
- Napier Gazelle
- Pratt & Whitney R-1340 Wasp
- Pratt & Whitney R-1830 Twin Wasp
- Rolls-Royce Avon RA.6
- Rolls-Royce Derwent 8
- Rolls-Royce Merlin XXIII
- Wright R-2600-13 Twin Cyclone

== See also ==
- List of aviation museums
