= Canadian Home Rotors Safari =

American kit helicopter

Safari
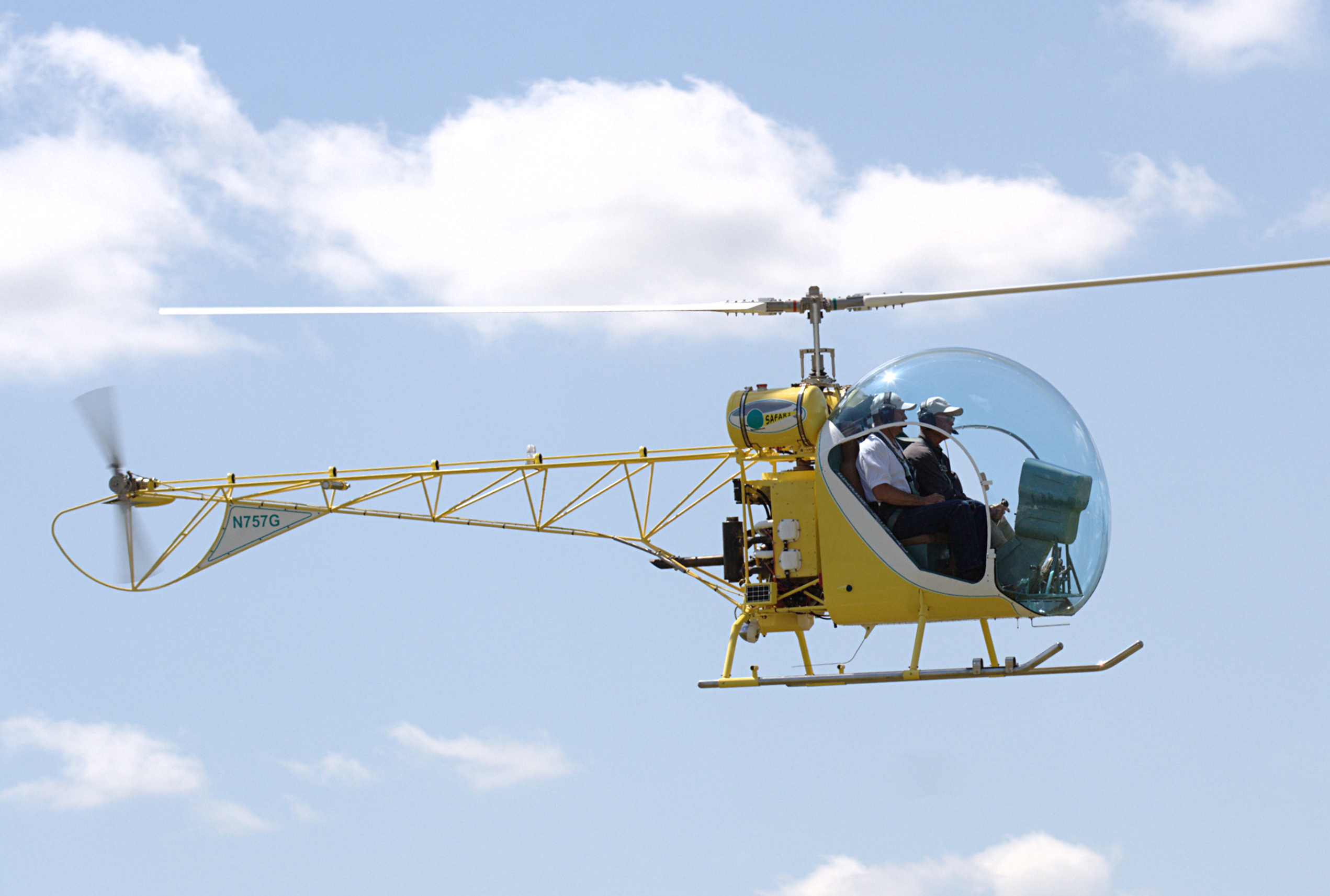
- A Safari over Oshkosh Airventure 2009

General information
- Type: Kit helicopter
- National origin: Canada
- Manufacturer: Safari Helicopter
- Number built: 120 (2005)

History
- Developed from: Helicom H-1 Commuter Jr

The Canadian Home Rotors Safari is a kit helicopter, produced by CHR International of Marianna, Florida, and formerly produced by Safari Helicopter (formerly known as Canadian Home Rotors) of Ear Falls, Ontario.

The design is reminiscent of a small-scale Bell 47 helicopter. In fact, the helicopter was originally called the Baby Belle, but Bell Helicopters objected and the name was changed to Safari.

== Design ==
The Safari is a two-seat light helicopter with a bubble canopy, a two-bladed main rotor and a skid landing gear. The aircraft structure consists predominantly of welded 4130 chromoly steel tubing. The kit provides the main and tail rotors, rotor hubs, transmission, engine, cockpit and tailboom completed. Builder construction is largely assembly.

Engine options over time have included the 160 hp (119 kW) Lycoming O-320-B2B, 180 hp (134 kW) Lycoming O-360-C2C, the 160 hp (119 kW) Superior XP320 and the 180 hp (134 kW) XP360 engines.

== Specifications (Safari 400) ==
Data from CHR

General characteristics

- Crew: one pilot
- Capacity: one passenger
- Length: 30 ft 3 in (9.22 m)
- Height: 8 ft 0 in (2.44 m)
- Airfoil: NACA0012
- Empty weight: 950 lb (431 kg)
- Gross weight: 1,600 lb (726 kg)
- Max takeoff weight: 1,600 lb (726 kg)
- Fuel capacity: 28 US gal (106 litres)
- Powerplant: 1 × Lycoming O-360-C2C four cylinder, four-stroke aircraft piston engine, 180 hp (130 kW)
- Main rotor diameter: 25 ft 4 in (7.72 m) chord 8 in (20 cm)

Performance

- Maximum speed: 100 mph (160 km/h, 87 kn)
- Cruise speed: 85 mph (137 km/h, 74 kn)
- Never exceed speed: 100 mph (160 km/h, 87 kn)
- Range: 270 mi (430 km, 230 nmi)
- Service ceiling: 10,000 ft (3,000 m)
- Rate of climb: 1,000 ft/min (5.1 m/s)

== See also ==
Related development

- Helicom H-1 Commuter Jr, Original design which the Safari evolved from.

Aircraft of comparable role, configuration, and era

- Bell 47
- Hiller OH-23 Raven
- Hughes TH-55 Osage
- Sikorsky S-300 (formerly Hughes/Schweizer 300)

Related lists

- List of aircraft
