= Hopfer =

Hopfer is a German surname. Notable people with the surname include:

- Bartholomäus Hopfer (1628–1699), German artist
- Daniel Hopfer (c. 1470 – 1536), German artist
- Liselotte Hopfer, German luger
- Thomas Hopfer (born 1990), Austrian footballer

== See also ==
- Hopfner (disambiguation), a similarly spelled surname
