= Helicom H-1 Commuter Jr =

H-1 Commuter Jr

General information
- Type: Helicopter
- Manufacturer: Helicom
- Designer: Harold Emigh

History
- Introduction date: 1953
- Variant: Canadian Home Rotors Safari

The Helicom H-1 Commuter Jr is a single or two place homebuilt helicopter.

== Design and development ==
The Commuter Jr uses a welded steel tube fuselage with a small forward fairing over the nose with a windscreen. It can seat two people in side-by-side configuration.

The rights to the Commuter I and II were sold to International Helicopters in 1970. Rights were sold again in 1980 with the company dissolving in 1981. The rights were purchased again in 1986 by Home Rotors Inc.

== Variants ==
Helicom H-1 Commuter Jr
Helicom Commuter I
Helicom Commuter II
Designed in 1962, Used a 150 hp (112 kW) engine.
Helicom Duster
100 hp Continental-powered version with 23-foot rotors, rigged for cropdusting.
International Helicopters H-1 Commuter IA
Fiberglass cabin
International Helicopters H-1 Commuter IIB
Fiberglass cabin
Canadian Home Rotors Safari
Heavily modified version by Canadian Home Rotors.

== Surviving aircraft ==
One example (c/n 101, N17RS) named "Schmidt Commuter Helicom" is on display at the Planes of Fame Museum, Valle-Williams, AZ

== Specifications (H-1 Commuter Jr) ==
Data from Air Trails

General characteristics

- Crew: 1
- Length: 18 ft 4 in (5.59 m)
- Height: 8 ft (2.4 m)
- Empty weight: 650 lb (295 kg)
- Gross weight: 950 lb (431 kg)
- Fuel capacity: 12 gal
- Powerplant: 1 × Franklin Sport 4B-1 Horizontally opposed piston, 85 hp (63 kW)
- Main rotor diameter: 21 ft 0 in (6.40 m)
- Main rotor area: 345 sq ft (32.1 m^{2})

Performance

- Maximum speed: 87 kn (100 mph, 160 km/h)
- Cruise speed: 78 kn (90 mph, 140 km/h)
- Range: 152 nmi (175 mi, 282 km)
- Service ceiling: 6,000 ft (1,800 m)
- Rate of climb: 1,600 ft/min (8.1 m/s)

== See also ==
- Hillman Hornet
