= Safari Helicopter =

Kit aircraft manufacturer

- Industry: Aerospace
- Headquarters: Hendersonville, Tennessee, United States
- Products: Kit aircraft
- Parent: CHR International
- Website: www.safarihelicopter.com

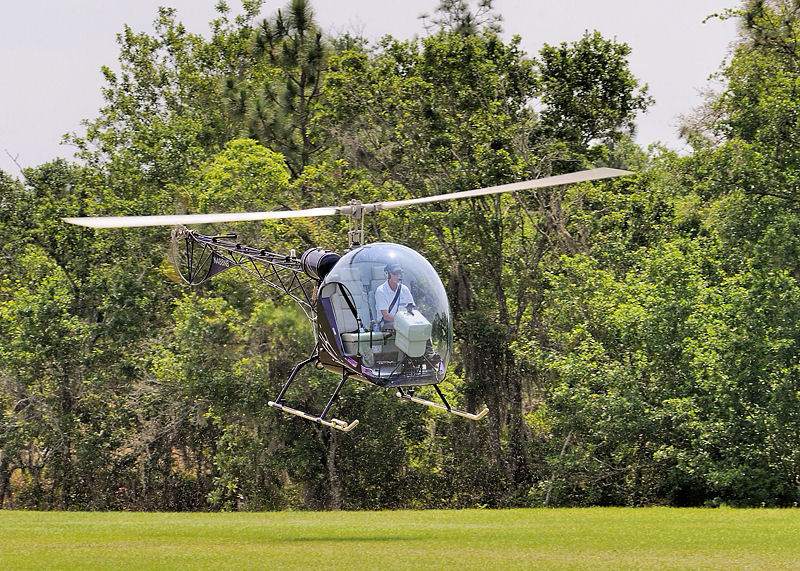
Safari Kit Helicopter at Sun-N-Fun 2013

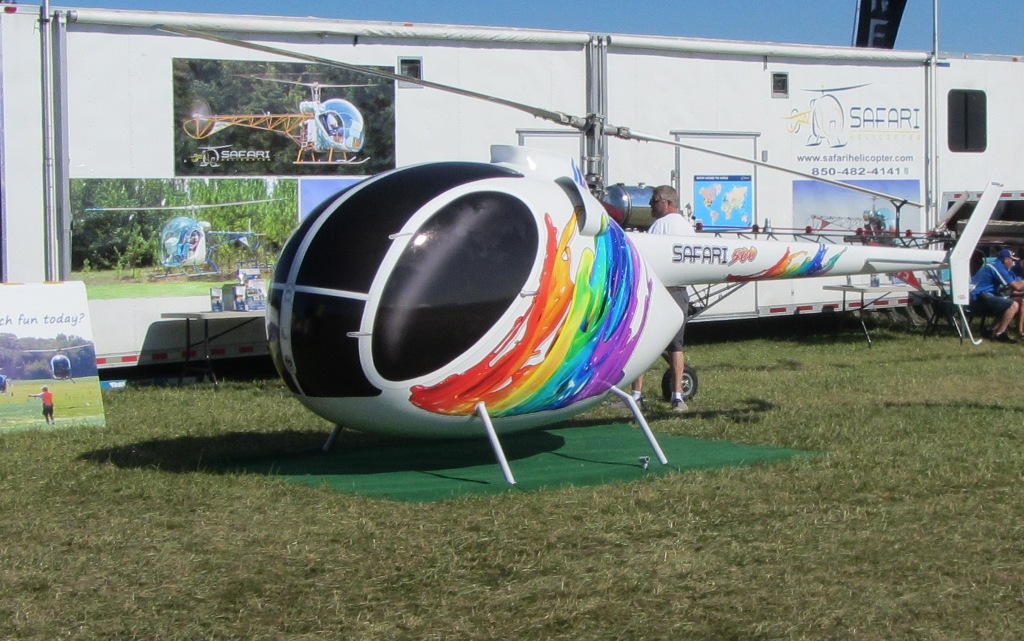
Safari 500

Safari Helicopter is an American kit aircraft manufacturer located in Hendersonville, Tennessee.

The company was originally known as Canadian Home Rotors and then Safari Helicopter and was founded in Ear Falls, Ontario, Canada. It was purchased by the Marianna, Florida-based company CHR International in August 2009.

Safari Helicopters moved their headquarters from Marianna, Florida to Hendersonville, Tennessee in 2021.

== Aircraft ==
- Canadian Home Rotors Safari
