= Horten H.VI =

German single-seat glider, 1944

H.VI
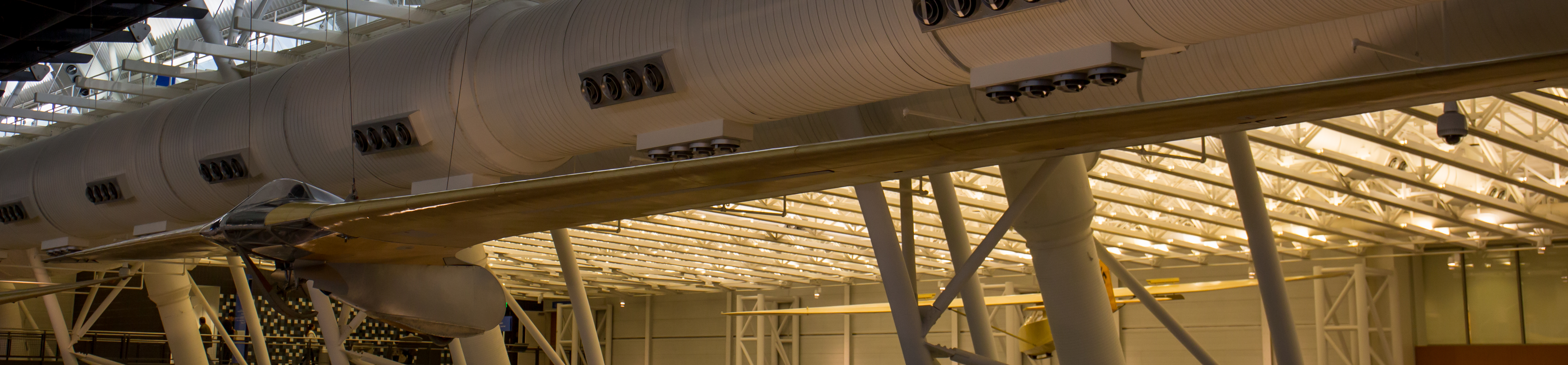
- Horten Ho VI V2 on display at the Steven F. Udvar-Hazy Center

General information
- Type: High performance sailplane
- National origin: Germany
- Manufacturer: Horteh
- Designer: Walter and Reimar Horten
- Number built: 2

History
- First flight: May 1944
- Developed from: Horten H.IV

The Horten H.VI is a flying wing aircraft designed by the Horten brothers during World War II.

Based on the Horten H.IV, the H.VI was an enlarged version of the H.IV, with the goal of comparing their flying wing designs against the very large span Akaflieg Darmstadt D-30 Cirrus.

The H.VI was allocated the RLM ID number 8-253 and by inference Horten Ho 253 though this was little used in practice.

== Specifications (H.VI V2) ==
Data from Sailplanes 1920-1945

General characteristics

- Crew: 1
- Length: 2.5 m (8 ft 2 in) centre-section (wing-tips extended past the end of the centre-section)
- Wingspan: 24.25 m (79 ft 7 in)
- Height: 1 m (3 ft 3 in)
- Wing area: 17.8 m^{2} (192 sq ft)
- Aspect ratio: 32.4
- Empty weight: 330 kg (728 lb)
- Gross weight: 410 kg (904 lb)

Performance

- Never exceed speed: 200 km/h (120 mph, 110 kn)
- Maximum glide ratio: 1:43
- Wing loading: 23 kg/m^{2} (4.7 lb/sq ft)
