= Hughes XV-9 =

American experimental helicopter

XV-9
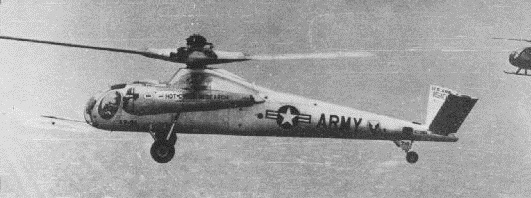
- The XV-9A during a test flight

General information
- Type: Experimental helicopter
- Manufacturer: Hughes Helicopters
- Status: Retired
- Number built: 1

History
- First flight: 5 November 1964
- Retired: 1965

The Hughes XV-9 (company designation Hughes Model 385) was a 1960s American high-speed research helicopter built by Hughes Helicopters.

== Design and development ==
The Model 385 was designed and built under a United States Army research contract to prove a concept known as hot-cycle propulsion. The helicopter was given the military designation XV-9A with the serial number 64-15107. Two General Electric YT64-GE-6 turbojets were used as gas generators, the jet efflux was ducted to nozzles at the blade tips. The rotor blades also had cooling ducts in both the leading and trailing edges. To keep costs to a minimum the cockpit with two side-by-side seats of an OH-6A was used and the landing gear was from a Sikorsky H-34.

== Operational service ==
The helicopter first flew on November 5, 1964. After test flight at Hughes facility at Culver City, California, the XV-9A was transferred to Edwards Air Force Base for further tests. The tests were satisfactory and the company was confident that the hot-cycle system would be widely used, although the XV-9A was noisy and had a high fuel consumption. The company was unable to mitigate the problems and the development by Hughes of pressure-jet systems did not proceed. The Army tests were completed in August 1965 and the helicopter was returned to Hughes.

== Variants ==
XV-9A
United States military designation for the Hughes Model 385, one built.

== Specifications (XV-9A) ==
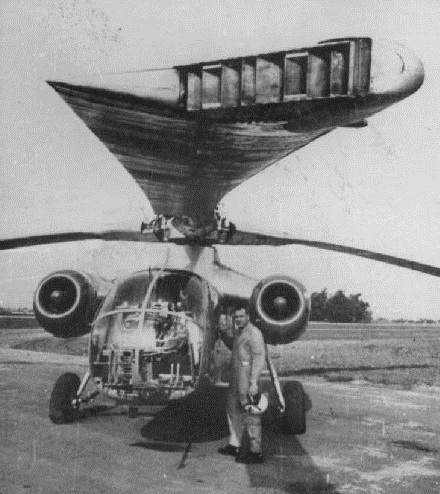
Detail of the bladetip diffuser

Data from U.S. Army Aircraft Since 1947

General characteristics

- Crew: Two
- Length: 45 ft 0 in (13.72 m)
- Height: 12 ft 0 in (3.66 m)
- Empty weight: 8,500 lb (3,864 kg)
- Gross weight: 15,300 lb (6,955 kg)
- Powerplant: 2 × General Electric YT64-GE-6 gas turbine , 2,850 hp (2,126 kW) each
- Main rotor diameter: 55 ft 0 in (16.76 m)
- Main rotor area: 2,376 sq ft (220.6 m^{2})

Performance

- Maximum speed: 173 mph (279 km/h, 150 kn)
- Cruise speed: 150 mph (242 km/h, 130 kn)
- Range: 165 mi (266 km, 143 nmi)
- Service ceiling: 11,500 ft (3,505 m)

== See also ==
- Hughes XH-17, a much larger test of the rotor concept
- Tip jet
