= Hubertec Thermik =

German ultralight trike

Thermik

General information
- Type: Ultralight trike and powered parachute
- National origin: Germany
- Manufacturer: Hubertec
- Status: In production (2013)

The Hubertec Thermik (English: Thermal) is a German ultralight trike, designed and produced by Hubertec of Aach, Rhineland-Palatinate. The aircraft is supplied as a complete ready-to-fly-aircraft.

The company is an industrial prototyping and exercise machine specialist that decided to produce an ultralight trike design as a sideline project.

== Design and development ==
Intended for self-launching and soaring flight, the Thermik was designed to comply with the Fédération Aéronautique Internationale microlight category, the German 120 kg ultralight class and the US FAR 103 Ultralight Vehicles rules.

The Thermik features a cable-braced hang glider-style high-wing, weight-shift controls, a single-seat open cockpit without a cockpit fairing, tricycle landing gear and a single engine in pusher configuration.

The aircraft is made from bolted-together aluminum tubing, with its double surface wing covered in Dacron sailcloth. Its 9.6 m (31.5 ft) span Bautek Pico two-place wing is supported by a single tube-type kingpost and uses an "A" frame weight-shift control bar. The powerplant is a single cylinder, air-cooled, two-stroke, 25 hp (19 kW) Simonini engine.

The Thermik has an empty weight of 48 kg (106 lb) and a gross weight of 200 kg (441 lb), giving a useful load of 152 kg (335 lb). With full fuel of 15 litres (3.3 imp gal; 4.0 US gal) the payload is 141 kg (311 lb).

The aircraft can utilize any hang glider wing that can support 140 kg (309 lb), although the prototype used a Bautek Pico two-place wing.

An alternative version that fits a paraglider wing is also available, flying as a powered parachute.

== Specifications (Thermik with Bautek Pico wing) ==
Data from Bayerl

General characteristics

- Crew: one
- Wingspan: 9.6 m (31 ft 6 in)
- Wing area: 17.2 m^{2} (185 sq ft)
- Empty weight: 48 kg (106 lb)
- Gross weight: 200 kg (441 lb)
- Fuel capacity: 15 litres (3.3 imp gal; 4.0 US gal)
- Powerplant: 1 × Simonini single cylinder, air-cooled, two stroke aircraft engine, 19 kW (25 hp)

Performance

- Maximum speed: 84 km/h (52 mph, 45 kn)
- Cruise speed: 60 km/h (37 mph, 32 kn)
- Stall speed: 28 km/h (17 mph, 15 kn)
- Rate of climb: 2.5 m/s (490 ft/min)
- Wing loading: 11.6 kg/m^{2} (2.4 lb/sq ft)
