= Hovey Delta Bird =

American ultralight airplane

Delta Bird
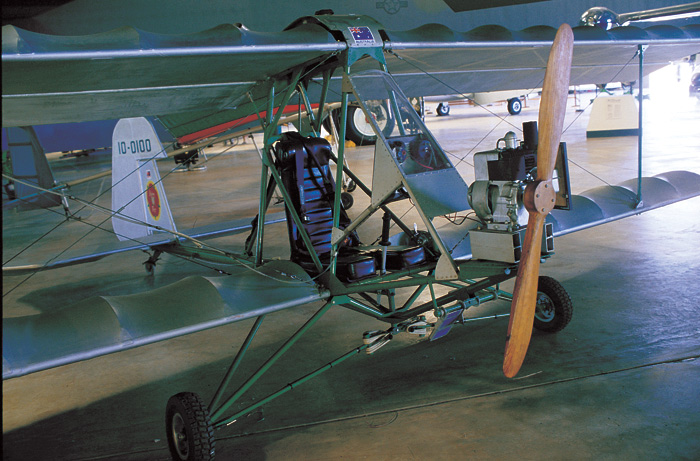
- Hovey Delta Bird at the Darwin Aviation Museum

General information
- Type: Ultralight aircraft
- National origin: United States
- Designer: Bob Hovey
- Status: Production completed

History
- Introduction date: 1982
- Developed from: Hovey Whing Ding II

The Hovey Delta Bird is an American ultralight aircraft that was designed by Bob Hovey in 1982 and supplied as plans for amateur construction.

== Design and development ==
The aircraft was designed to comply with the US FAR 103 Ultralight Vehicles rules, including the category's maximum empty weight of 254 lb (115 kg). The aircraft has a standard empty weight of 218 lb (99 kg). It features a biplane wing configuration, a single-seat, open cockpit, conventional landing gear and a single engine in tractor configuration.

The aircraft is made from pop-riveted and gusseted aluminum tubing, with the wings and tail surfaces covered in doped aircraft fabric covering. Its biplane wing has a top span of 24 ft (7.3 m), a bottom span of 20.3 ft (6.2 m), employs cabane struts and one set of interplane struts. The controls are conventional three-axis, with full-span ailerons on the top wing. The landing gear is bungee suspended and includes main wheel brakes and tailwheel steering. Common engines used include the 30 hp (22 kW) Cuyuna 430R in the Delta Bird and the 40 hp (30 kW) Kawasaki 440 in the Delta Hawk.

== Variants ==
Delta Bird
Base model, an open cockpit design, with the pilot's seat mounted to the main keel tube.
Delta Hawk
Model with conventional fabric-covered fuselage, 248 lb (112 kg) empty weight and 445 lb (202 kg) gross weight.
Super Delta Hawk
Model with sheet aluminum covered fuselage.

== Specifications (Delta Bird) ==
Data from Cliche and Virtual Ultralight Museum

General characteristics

- Crew: one
- Length: 15 ft 0 in (4.57 m)
- Upper wingspan: 24 ft 0 in (7.32 m)
- Lower wingspan: 20 ft 4 in (6.20 m)
- Height: 6 ft 0 in (1.83 m)
- Wing area: 160 sq ft (15 m^{2})
- Empty weight: 218 lb (99 kg)
- Gross weight: 415 lb (188 kg)
- Fuel capacity: 5 U.S. gallons (19 L; 4.2 imp gal)
- Powerplant: 1 × Cuyuna 430R , 30 hp (22 kW)

Performance

- Maximum speed: 60 mph (97 km/h, 52 kn)
- Cruise speed: 45 mph (72 km/h, 39 kn)
- Stall speed: 26 mph (42 km/h, 23 kn)
- Never exceed speed: 80 mph (130 km/h, 70 kn)
- Range: 50 mi (80 km, 43 nmi)
- g limits: +3.5/-3.5
- Maximum glide ratio: 6:1
- Rate of climb: 400 ft/min (2.0 m/s)
- Wing loading: 2.6 lb/sq ft (13 kg/m^{2})
