= Hirsch H.100 =

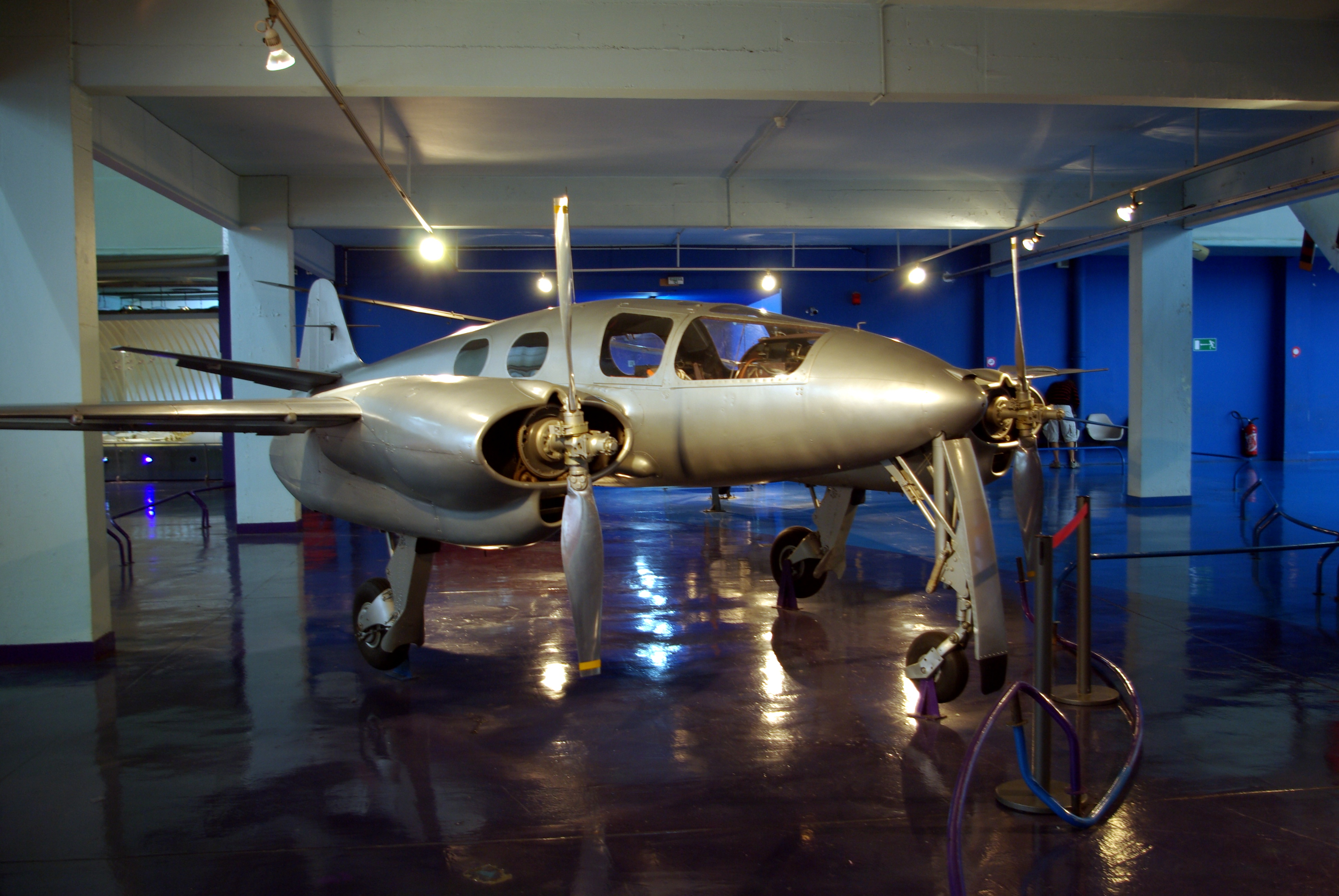
- H-100 (Lycoming engines) exhibited at the Air & Space Museum at Le Bourget, France

General information
- Type: Anti-gust aerodynamic research
- National origin: France
- Manufacturer: Société MAéRC
- Designer: René Hirsch
- Number built: 1

History
- First flight: 15 June 1954

The Hirsch or Hirsch-MAéRC H.100 is an experimental aircraft, built in France in the 1950s to test an aerodynamic gust suppression system. The system worked but was not further developed.

== Design and development ==
René Hirsch had been working on aerodynamic methods that would stabilize an aircraft meeting a gust since 1936 and had set up a company to this end, Moyens aérodynamiques de regulation et de contrôle (MAéRC) (English: Aerodynamic means of regulation and control). Making its first flight on 15 June 1954, the H.100 incorporated the results of his research but was MAéRC's only aircraft.

Control systems apart, the H.100 was a fairly conventional twin engine, wooden aircraft, with a cantilever low wing of trapezoidal plan. The fuselage was strikingly clean aerodynamically, with only gradual changes of cross-section from nose to tail. Behind the pilot's transparency there were three starboard and two port side windows. The horizontal surfaces, mounted on top of the fuselage, had both a high aspect ratio and marked dihedral. Originally the vertical tail was rounded and quite small but during development a large, straight tapered ventral fin was added.

The H.100 had a tall, rearward retracting tricycle undercarriage. The main legs retracted into extensions of the engine fairings beyond the wing trailing edge.

Little detail about the stabilization system is recorded. It is known that the horizontal tail surfaces were hinged to allow the dihedral to change and that such motions were coupled to lift-changing flaps. Together, these stabilized pitch. The wing tips could rotate to control roll. The system was pneumatically powered and could be turned on and off in flight to test its efficiency.

On its first flight and for early tests, the H.100 was powered by two 71 kW (95 hp) Régnier 4EO four cylinder inverted air-cooled engines. The aircraft was damaged in a take-off accident on 3 September 1955 and during a prolonged rebuild the Régnier's were replaced with much more powerful 127 kW (170 hp) Lycoming O-360 flat-four engines. It flew with these engines in 1962.

Test flights reportedly showed satisfactory results but, with investment lacking, nothing further resulted. The H.100 made its last flight on 16 June 1971, having flown for a total of 130 hours. In that year it was donated to the Musée de l'Air et de l'Espace, at Le Bourget, Paris, It remains on display there.

== Specifications (Régnier engines) ==
Data from Gaillard (1990) p.151

General characteristics

- Crew: Three
- Length: 7.60 m (24 ft 11 in)
- Wingspan: 8.60 m (28 ft 3 in)
- Height: 2.15 m (7 ft 1 in)
- Wing area: 8.5 m^{2} (91 sq ft)
- Empty weight: 904 kg (1,993 lb)
- Max takeoff weight: 1,319 kg (2,908 lb)
- Powerplant: 2 × Régnier 4EO 4-cylinder inverted air-cooled piston engine, 71 kW (95 hp) each
- Propellers: 2-bladed

Performance

- Maximum speed: 330 km/h (210 mph, 180 kn)
- Cruise speed: 305 km/h (190 mph, 165 kn)
- Range: 1,750 km (1,090 mi, 940 nmi)
- Service ceiling: 6,100 m (20,000 ft)

== See also ==
- List of experimental aircraft
