= Hollandsche Vliegtuigenfabriek Avia =

Avia

General information
- Type: Two seat fighter aircraft/post and passenger transport
- National origin: Nederlands
- Manufacturer: Hollandsche Vliegtuigenfabriek
- Designer: Jablonski

History
- First flight: May not have flown

The Hollandsche Vliegtuigenfabriek Avia was a two-seat biplane, designed and displayed in the Netherlands in 1918. It was advertised as a fighter or as a post and passenger aircraft. Its first flight has not been confirmed.

== Design and development ==
The Avia's only known appearance was at an exhibition at Rotterdam after the Armistice in 1918, where it was described both as a fighter, carrying fixed, forward firing machine guns and a moveable gun in the rear cockpit, and as a post- and passenger carrier. It was a two bay biplane with parallel interplane struts. The upper wing was supported over the fuselage by a cabane structure. It had a fixed, single axle conventional undercarriage, with struts from each wheel to the central fuselage underside and was powered by a 134 kW (180 hp) Argus six cylinder upright inline water-cooled engine, driving a two blade propeller.

There were reports that the Avia was to be taken to Soesterberg for flight testing but nothing more was heard about it.

== Specifications ==
Data from Wissenlink

General characteristics

- Crew: Two
- Wingspan: 11.60 m (38 ft 1 in)
- Gross weight: 1,200 kg (2,646 lb) approximately
- Powerplant: 1 × Argus Motoren As III 6-cylinder upright water-cooled inline engine, 130 kW (180 hp)
- Propellers: 2-bladed

Performance

- Maximum speed: 180 km/h (110 mph, 97 kn) estimated
- Endurance: 4.5 hr estimated
