= Hollsmidt 222 =

Hollsmidt 222 (HT-1)
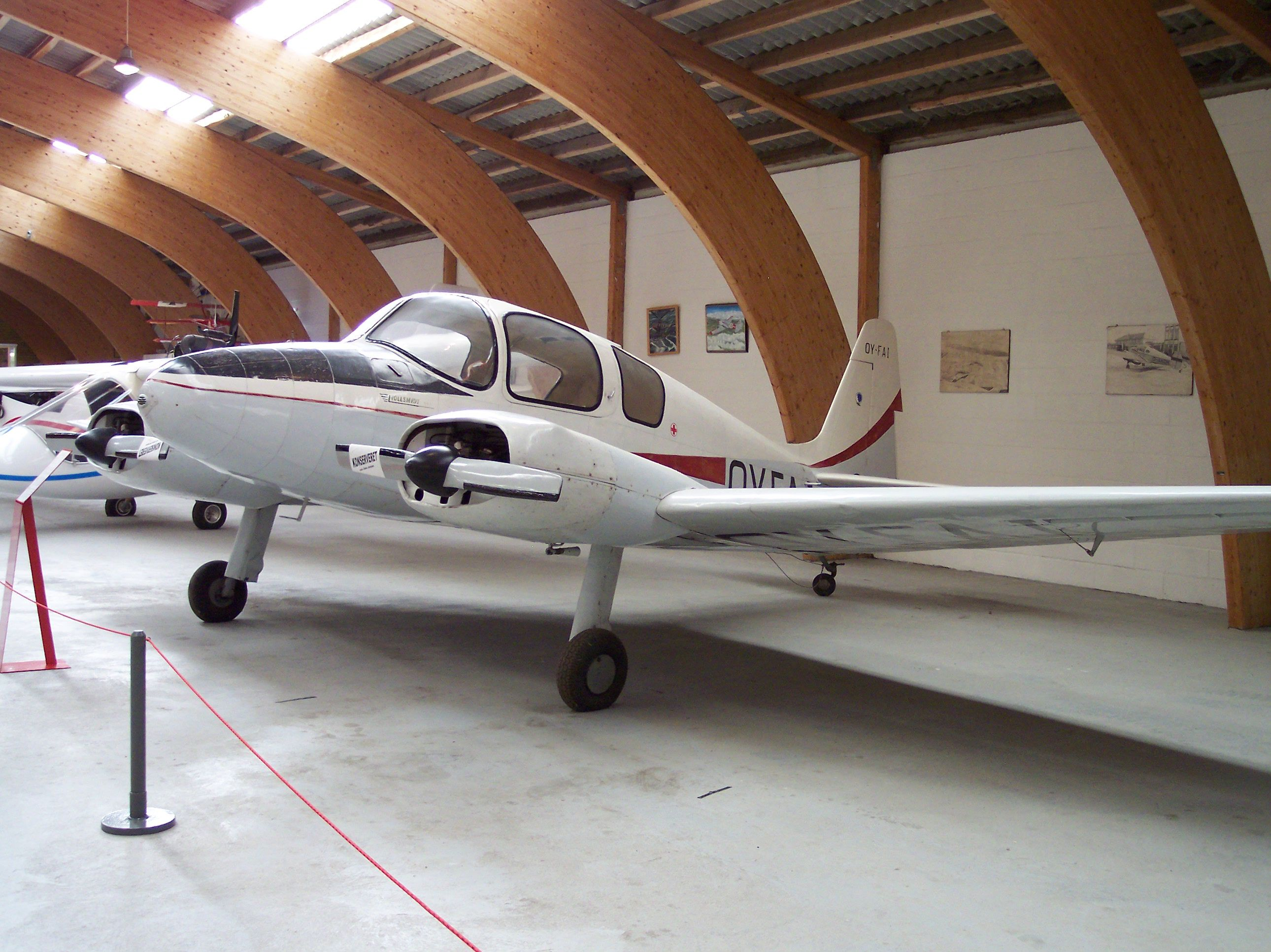
- Hollsmidt 222 at Dansk Veteranflysamling

General information
- Type: Utility aircraft
- Manufacturer: Amateur
- Designer: Harald Thyregod
- Status: Prototype
- Primary user: Denmark
- Number built: 1

History
- First flight: 24 April 1964
- Retired: 1978

The Hollsmidt 222 or HT-1 was a Danish light utility amateur aircraft.

== Design and development ==
The plane was designed by engineer Harald Thyregod in 1958 and built by a farmer Arne Hollænder and Aksel Smidt at Hollænder's farm in Aarre. Therefore, it is known as HT-1 for Harald Thyregod or Hollsmidt for two builders. The idea was to create a light, cheap aircraft, fit to homebuilding, with two engines giving more safety. The engines themselves were converted Volkswagen car engines.

== Operational history ==
The plane was first flown by Harald Thyregod on 24 April 1964. It was used by Arne Hollænder and received a registration OY-FAI. At the end of airworthiness (estimated at 300 hours), in 1978 it was donated to Denmark's "flying" Museum (Dansk Veteranflysamling).

== Specifications ==
General characteristics

- Crew: 1
- Capacity: 1 passenger
- Length: 5.83 m (19 ft 2 in)
- Wingspan: 8.87 m (29 ft 1 in)
- Empty weight: 332 kg (732 lb)
- Gross weight: 500 kg (1,102 lb)
- Powerplant: 2 × Volkswagen 1200 4-cyl air-cooled boxer engine, 48 kW (65 hp) each

Performance

- Maximum speed: 210 km/h (130 mph, 110 kn)
- Cruise speed: 157 km/h (98 mph, 85 kn)
