= HPK SP-1 =

General information
- Type: Homebuilt aircraft
- National origin: United States of America
- Manufacturer: HPK Aircraft Associates, a division of Engle Flying Service, Inc.
- Designer: Harold Hayden, Art Payne, Robert Kinney, Norman R. Benner
- Number built: 1

History
- Introduction date: 1957
- First flight: 23 August 1957

The HPK SP-1 a.k.a. "Some Pisser-1" is a single seat homebuilt aircraft.

== Design and development ==
Engle Flying Service members, Harold Hayden, Art Payne, Robert Kinney, and Norman R. Benner developed the HPK SP-1 over the course of five years. Plans for a two-seat side by side, and four seat variants were not completed.

The SP-1 is a single-place, all-metal, low-wing aircraft with conventional landing gear and partial span split trailing edge flaps. The cowling is from a Piper Tri-Pacer.

== Operational history ==
The aircraft was built and tested at Three-M airfield in Pennsylvania, home of Kaiser-Fleetwings Company. The prototype has been registered for over 50 years.

== Specifications (HPK SP-1) ==
Data from sport aviation

General characteristics

- Length: 19 ft 1 in (5.82 m)
- Wingspan: 25 ft (7.6 m)
- Height: 8 ft 1 in (2.46 m)
- Wing area: 99 sq ft (9.2 m^{2})
- Airfoil: 4412
- Empty weight: 1,300 lb (590 kg)
- Powerplant: 1 × Lycoming O-235-C1 , 115 hp (86 kW)
- Propellers: 2-bladed

Performance

- Maximum speed: 140 kn (160 mph, 260 km/h)
- Cruise speed: 126 kn (145 mph, 233 km/h)
- Stall speed: 43 kn (50 mph, 80 km/h)
- Wing loading: 13 lb/sq ft (63 kg/m^{2})
