= Honda MH01 =

1980s prototype aircraft

MH01

General information
- Type: Experimental aircraft
- Manufacturer: Honda; Mississippi State University
- Status: Retired
- Number built: 1

The Honda MH01 is an experimental aircraft developed by the Japanese company Honda, in cooperation with the Raspet Flight Research Laboratory of Mississippi State University.

Using the airframe of a Beechcraft Bonanza, Honda sought to incorporate composite materials into a metal aircraft, the first this had been done in a business aircraft. The goal was also to gain experience in aircraft design and construction.

Its successor is the Honda MH02, a jet that uses exclusively composite materials.

== See also ==
Related development

- Honda HA-420 HondaJet

Related lists

- List of civil aircraft
- List of experimental aircraft
