= Hoffman X-1 =

General information
- Type: Homebuilt aircraft
- National origin: United States
- Designer: Edward C. Hoffman

History
- First flight: 24 February 1960

The Hoffman X-1 Sweet Patootie is an American homebuilt aircraft designed by Edward C. Hoffman, first flying on 24 February 1960.

== Design and development ==
The Hoffman "Sweet Patootie" is a single place, low-wing, conventional landing gear-equipped aircraft.

== Specifications (X1) ==
Data from Jane's All the World's Aircraft 1961–62

General characteristics

- Crew: 1
- Length: 17 ft 6 in (5.33 m)
- Wingspan: 19 ft 0 in (5.79 m)
- Height: 10 ft 0 in (4.0 m)
- Airfoil: NACA 23015
- Empty weight: 616 lb (279 kg)
- Gross weight: 894 lb (406 kg)
- Powerplant: 1 × Continental C90 horizontally opposed piston aircraft engine, 90 hp (67 kW)

Performance

- Maximum speed: 125 mph (201 km/h, 109 kn)
- Cruise speed: 120 mph (190 km/h, 100 kn)
- Range: 200 mi (320 km, 170 nmi)
- Rate of climb: 1,000 ft/min (5.1 m/s)
