= Hovey Whing Ding =

American ultralight aircraft

Whing Ding II
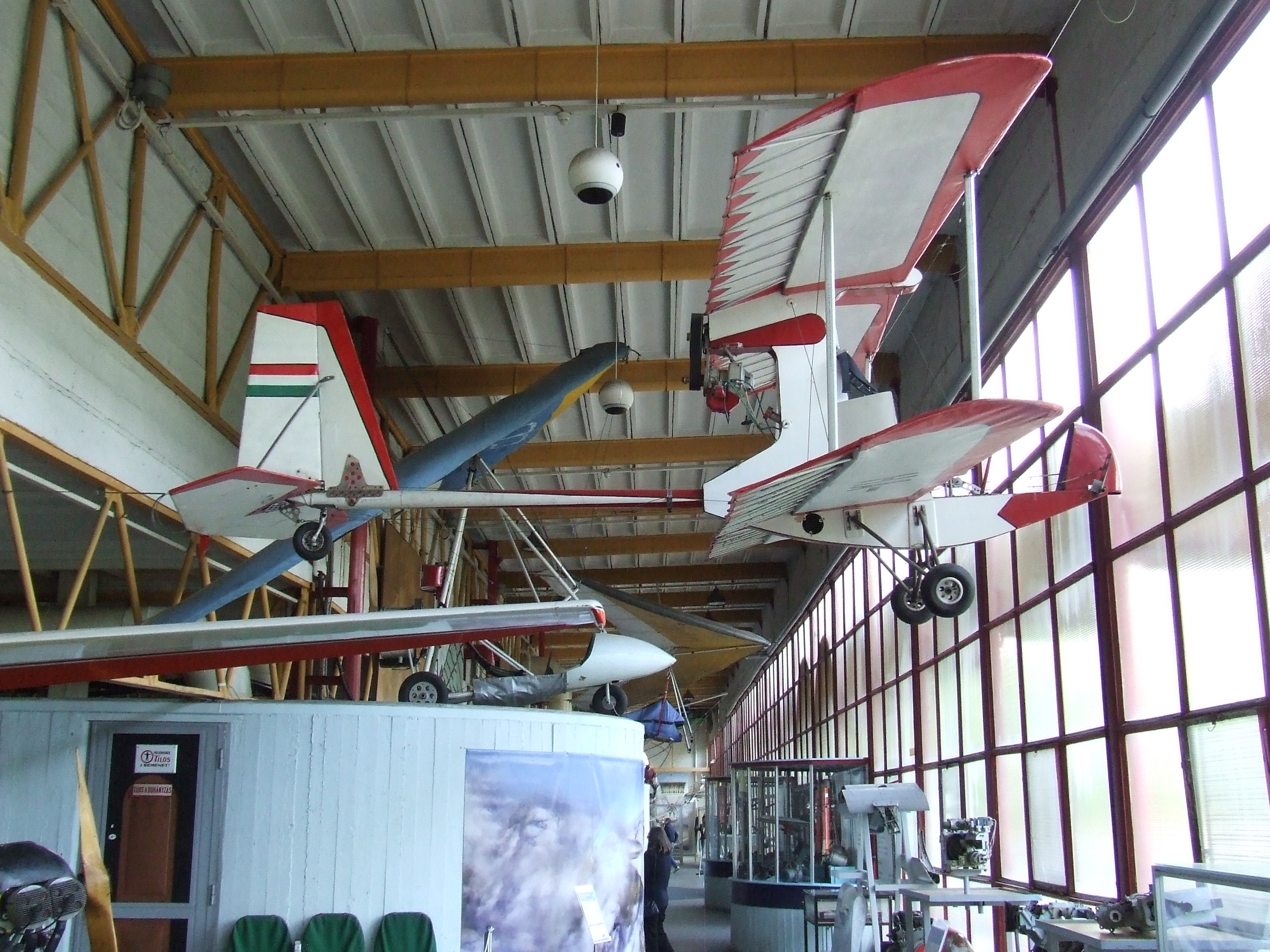

General information
- Type: Ultralight aircraft
- National origin: United States
- Manufacturer: Vintage Ultralight and Lightplane Association
- Designer: Bob Hovey
- Status: Plans available (2014)

History
- First flight: February 1971
- Variant: Hovey Delta Bird

The Hovey Whing Ding is an extremely minimalist American ultralight aircraft that was designed by Bob Hovey of Saugus, California, first flying in 1971. The aircraft is supplied in the form of plans for amateur construction by the Vintage Ultralight and Lightplane Association of Marietta, Georgia.

== Design and development ==
Hovey set out to create the lightest aircraft to carry a person ever to fly, with the resulting design being a biplane, with a plywood box filled with Polyurethane foam serving as the fuselage, supporting the pilot's seat. The aircraft features a conventional fabric-covered empennage carried at the end of a short tailboom made of aluminum tube. The horizontal stabilizer is made from reinforced cardboard. Early versions used wing warping for roll control, while later models used full-span ailerons. The specified pusher configuration powerplant is a McCulloch chainsaw engine turning a hand-carved wooden propeller via a chain drive. The first prototype had a monowheel undercarriage, with skids under the wingtips, but this was soon changed to twin mainwheels carried on a spring-type strut. With no brakes to stop the aircraft after landing, pilots were supposed to press their heels against the mainwheels.

The Whing Ding was designed long before the US FAR 103 Ultralight Vehicles regulations were introduced, but it fully conforms to the rules. The Whing Ding helped generate interest in ultralight aircraft and lead to the ultralight boom of the late 1970s and 1980s.

Hovey conceived of the aircraft as an experimental project and not as a form of transportation. Due to its unreliable powerplant he intended it to only be flown over open areas where a safe landing could be carried out at any time. The plans were complex to follow and were not intended to make construction easy. Construction time typically is about 400 hours.

The Whing Ding was marketed as plans, and sold extremely well - by 1979, over 6,000 sets had been purchased. In 2011 the plans were still available, and at no cost.

On 22 June 2022, the Dingo, a full metal replica of the Hovey Whing Ding, designed by Marek Ivanov since 2021, took maiden flight by test pilot Jan Jílek at the Jaroměř airport (LKJA). This prototype plane was powered by two-stroke 27 hp Vittorazi Moster engine with 185-cc displacement and air-cooling. As of 2024, the Dingo is available as a ready to build KIT plane provided by the Future Vehicles s.r.o.

My long-time dream was to build something like Hovey Whing Ding because I like it, but a little bigger so I can fly it.

— Ing. Marek Ivanov, Chief Designer of DINGO, https://www.futurevehicles.eu/dingo-en/

== Operational history ==
Depending on the density altitude and the weight of the pilot, some builders discovered that the aircraft was under powered and suffered from too small a wing area to climb out of ground effect.

== Variants ==
Whing Ding
Initial version
Whing Ding II
Improved version, incorporating a higher seat to prevent pilots dragging their feet on the ground to stop the aircraft, which resulting in broken bones in some cases.

== Specifications (typical) ==
Data from Cliche and the Virtual Ultralight Museum

General characteristics

- Crew: one
- Length: 14 ft (4.3 m)
- Wingspan: 17 ft (5.2 m)
- Height: 5 ft 6 in (1.68 m)
- Wing area: 98 sq ft (9.1 m^{2})
- Empty weight: 122 lb (55 kg)
- Gross weight: 300 lb (136 kg)
- Fuel capacity: 0.5 U.S. gallons (1.9 L; 0.42 imp gal)
- Powerplant: 1 × McCulloch MAC-101 chain saw engine, 12.5 hp (9.3 kW)
- Propellers: 2-bladed hand carved wooden propeller

Performance

- Maximum speed: 50 mph (80 km/h, 43 kn)
- Cruise speed: 40 mph (64 km/h, 35 kn)
- Stall speed: 26 mph (42 km/h, 23 kn)
- Range: 20 mi (32 km, 17 nmi)
- Service ceiling: 4,000 ft (1,200 m)
- g limits: +3/-3
- Rate of climb: 100 ft/min (0.51 m/s)

Avionics

- none

== See also ==
Aircraft of comparable role, configuration, and era

- Aerosport Rail
- RLU-1 Breezy
