= Horten Aircraft HX-2 =

German flying wing

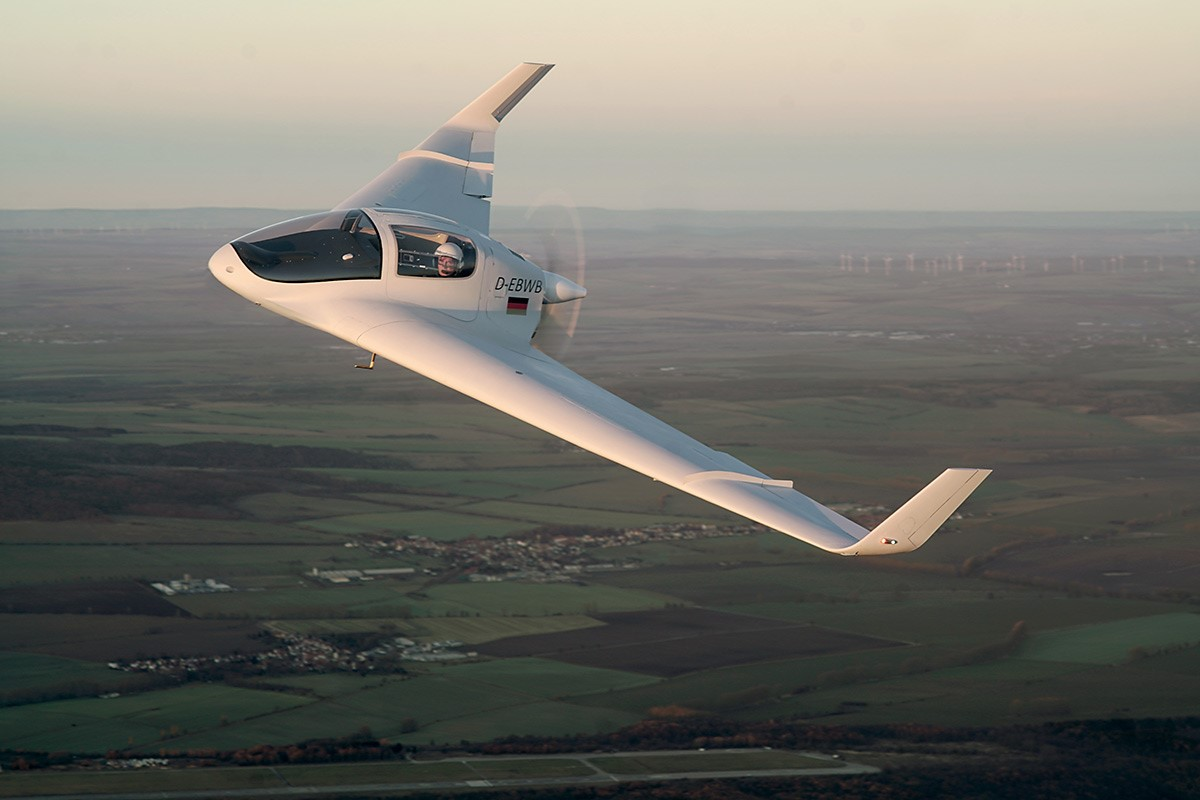
HX-2 Flying Wing during flight testing in Eisenach, Germany

The Horten Aircraft HX-2 is a two-seat flying wing or "Blended Wing Body" aircraft powered by a Rotax 912 iS2 engine. It was built and first flown by Horten Aircraft in 2018 as an experimental aircraft. Test flying continued in 2019 at the Kindel Airfield near Eisenach in Germany.

== Design and development ==
The company is named after aircraft designer Reimar Horten (1915-1994). He is regarded as a pioneer in the field of tailess aircraft and made the most significant contributions to the development of predecessor aircraft prototypes, including the PUL-9 and PUL-10.

The HX-2 has a two-seat enclosed cockpit in the centre of the carbon-fibre and glass-fibre honeycomb structure, reinforced to provide roll-over protection. The undercarriage comprises a retractable tricycle landing gear, with an emergency ballistic parachute.

By June 2019 there were no published performance specifications for the design, but the company claimed that it would be faster and with greater range than comparable aircraft, due to the lower drag of its no-fuselage design.

The manufacturer claimed that the design was intended to accept new technology propulsion systems, as they become available.

The HX-2 prototype was exhibited at AERO Friedrichshafen, 2019.

== Specifications (HX-2) ==
General characteristics

- Crew: 2
- Length: 4.5 m (14 ft 9 in)
- Wingspan: 10 m (32 ft 10 in)
- Gross weight: 600 kg (1,323 lb)
- Fuel capacity: 240 L (63 US gal; 53 imp gal)
- Powerplant: 1 × Rotax 912 iS2 4-cylinder air-cooled horizontally-opposed piston engine, 75 kW (100 hp)
