= Hillman Hornet =

General information
- Type: Homebuilt aircraft
- National origin: United States
- Designer: Doug Hillman

History
- Developed from: Helicom H-1 Commuter Jr

The Hilman Hornet is a two place homebuilt helicopter.

== Development ==
The Hillman Hornet is a two place side by side helicopter designed for homebuilt construction. it features an enclosed cabin without side doors. The helicopter was an evolution of the Helicom H-1 Commuter Jr funded by 10 San Luis Obispo County investors.

== Variants ==
Hornet
Standard piston engined homebuilt helicopter.
Turbo Hornet
Turboshaft powered variant of the Hornet

== Specifications (Hillman Hornet) ==
Data from Air Progress, Plane and Pilot

General characteristics

- Crew: 1
- Capacity: 1 passenger
- Length: 21 ft 2 in (6.45 m)
- Wingspan: 25 ft 5 in (7.75 m)
- Empty weight: 800 lb (363 kg)
- Gross weight: 1,400 lb (635 kg)
- Fuel capacity: 22
- Powerplant: 1 × Lycoming O-320-A2B horizontally-opposed air-cooled, four-cylinder piston engine, 150 hp (110 kW)
- Main rotor diameter: × 25 ft 5 in (7.75 m)

Performance

- Maximum speed: 87 kn (100 mph, 160 km/h)
- Cruise speed: 78 kn (90 mph, 140 km/h)
- Range: 170 nmi (200 mi, 320 km)
- Service ceiling: 12,000 ft (3,700 m)

== See also ==
- YouTube video of Hornet in flight

Related development

- Helicom H-1 Commuter Jr
