= Hirtenberg HS.9 =

HS.9 and HS.16
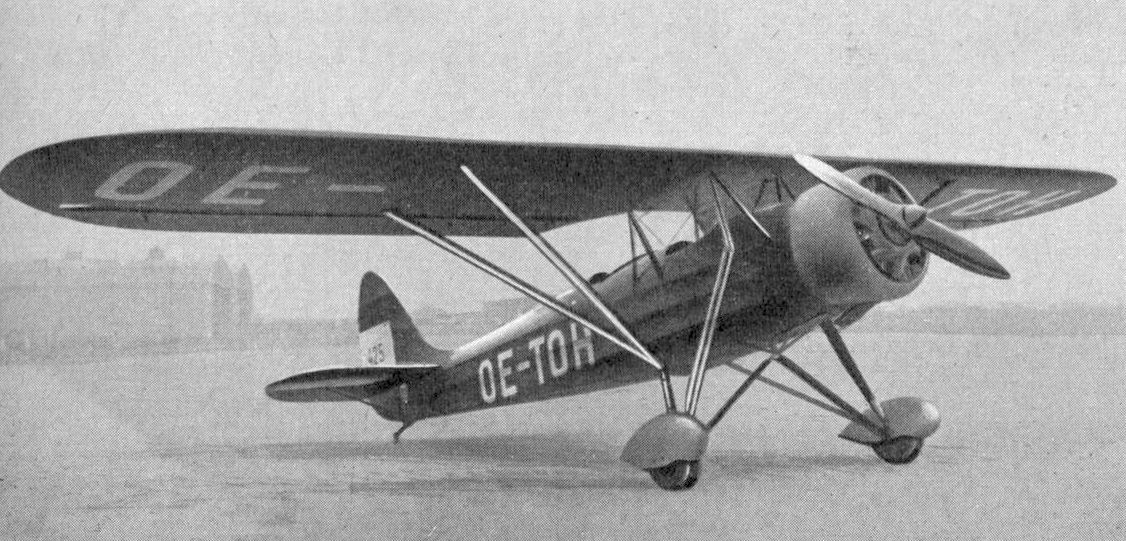
- HS.9

General information
- Type: two-seat touring monoplane
- Manufacturer: Hopfner, Hirtenberg
- Designer: Theodor Hopfner
- Number built: ca. 40

History
- First flight: 1932

The Hirtenberg HS.9 was an Austrian two-seat touring or training aircraft of the early 1930s.

== Design and development ==
A derivative of the Hopfner HS-5/28 via the Hopfner HS-8/29, the HS.9 was a parasol wing monoplane with a fixed tailskid landing gear and room for two occupants in tandem open cockpits, and first flew as the Hopfner HS-9/32 in 1932, powered by a de Havilland Gipsy I engine. Production versions had Siemens Sh 14 engines with NACA cowlings. A single example of a refined version with an uncowled Siemens engine was flown in 1935 as the Hopfner HS-9/35, shortly before the Hopfner company went bankrupt.

When Hopfner's assets were purchased by Otto Eberhardt Patronenfabrik, production continued of both de Havilland- and Siemens-powered aircraft under the Hirtenberg brand.

== Variants ==
- HS-9/32 - Original version by Hopfner
- HS-9/35 - developed version of HS-9/32
- HS.9 - Production aircraft with a Siemens Sh 14a piston engine.
  - HS.9A - Production aircraft with a de Havilland Gipsy Major piston engine.
- HS.16 - military trainer version of HS.9

== Operators ==
Austria

- Austrian Air Force (1927-1938)

== Specifications (HS.9A) ==
Data from British Civil Aircraft since 1919 Volume 3.

General characteristics

- Crew: 2
- Length: 8.05 m (26 ft 5 in)
- Wingspan: 10.972 m (36 ft 0 in)
- Empty weight: 568.8 kg (1,254 lb)
- Gross weight: 948 kg (2,090 lb)
- Powerplant: 1 × de Havilland Gipsy Major , 90 kW (120 hp)

Performance

- Maximum speed: 190 km/h (118 mph, 103 kn)
