= Hopfner HA-11/33 =

HA-11/33, Wn 11
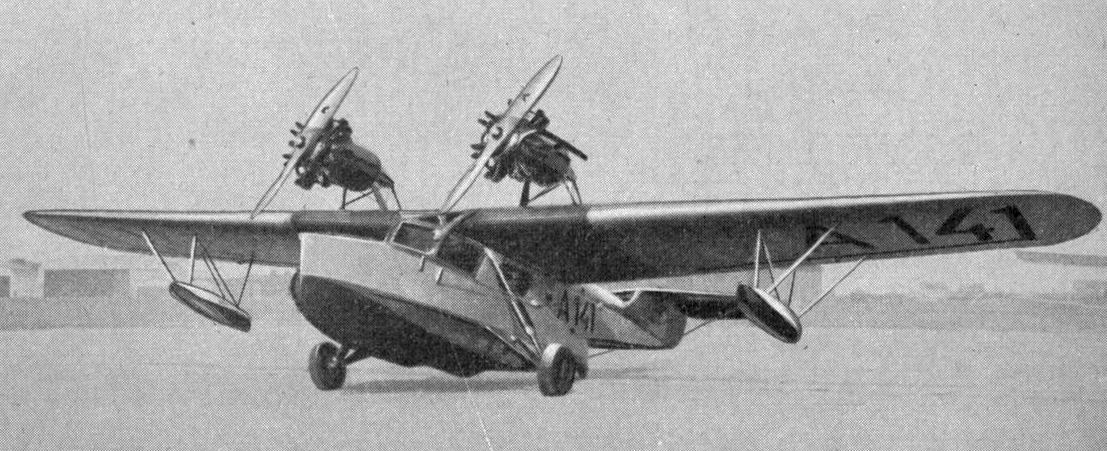

General information
- Type: Utility amphibian
- National origin: Austria
- Manufacturer: Hopfner, WNF
- Designer: Theodor Hopfner

History
- First flight: 1933

The Hopfner HA-11/33 was an amphibious flying boat built in Austria in 1933 to a specification by the Dr. Oetker company. The result was a conventional, high-wing cantilever monoplane with a stepped flying boat hull and pontoons on struts under the wings at mid-span. The cabin was fully enclosed, and the twin engines were mounted tractor-fashion on struts above the wing.

== Development ==
A HA-11/33 was purchased by the Austrian Air Force, and was subsequently absorbed into the German Luftwaffe following the Anschluss. Deemed worthy of further development, WNF (which had absorbed Hirtenberg, which itself had taken over Hopfner) was tasked with developing it into a military training aircraft for flying boat pilots. Designated WNF Wn 11 by the RLM, testing was undertaken at Travemünde in 1940, but the type was not ordered into production. Development of a highly streamlined derivative with Hirth HM 508 engines, the WNF Wn 11C was also abandoned.

== Specifications ==
Data from

General characteristics

- Crew: 1
- Capacity: 3 pax
- Length: 10.17 m (33 ft 4 in)
- Wingspan: 14.11 m (46 ft 4 in)
- Height: 3.15 m (10 ft 4 in)
- Wing area: 30.4 m^{2} (327 sq ft)
- Empty weight: 1,100 kg (2,425 lb)
- Gross weight: 1,800 kg (3,968 lb)
- Powerplant: 2 × Siemens Sh 14A 7-cylinder air-cooled radial piston engines, 93 kW (125 hp) each
- Propellers: 2-bladed wooden fixed-pitch propellers

Performance

- Maximum speed: 190 km/h (120 mph, 100 kn)
- Cruise speed: 160 km/h (99 mph, 86 kn)
- Range: 900 km (560 mi, 490 nmi)
- Service ceiling: 4,500 m (14,800 ft)
