= Hoefelman CH-1 Schatzie =

CH-1 Schatzie

General information
- Type: Homebuilt aircraft
- National origin: United States
- Designer: Charles D Hoefelman

History
- Introduction date: 1967

The Hoefelman CH-1 Schatzie is an American aircraft that was designed by Charles D Hoefelman for homebuilt construction.

== Design and development ==
The Schatzie is a single engine, negative stagger biplane with retractable conventional landing gear. The fuselage is welded steel tubing with aircraft fabric covering. The wing is of wood construction.

== Specifications (CH-1 Schatzie) ==
Data from Sports Planes

General characteristics

- Crew: 1
- Length: 18 ft 3 in (5.56 m)
- Wingspan: 23 ft 4 in (7.11 m)
- Powerplant: 1 × Lycoming O-235 horizontally-opposed piston aircraft engine, 125 hp (93 kW)

Performance

- Maximum speed: 123 kn (141 mph, 227 km/h)
- Cruise speed: 110 kn (130 mph, 210 km/h)
- Range: 320 nmi (370 mi, 600 km)

== See also ==
Aircraft of comparable role, configuration, and era

- Sorrell Hiperbipe
