= Hirtenberg =

- Municipality
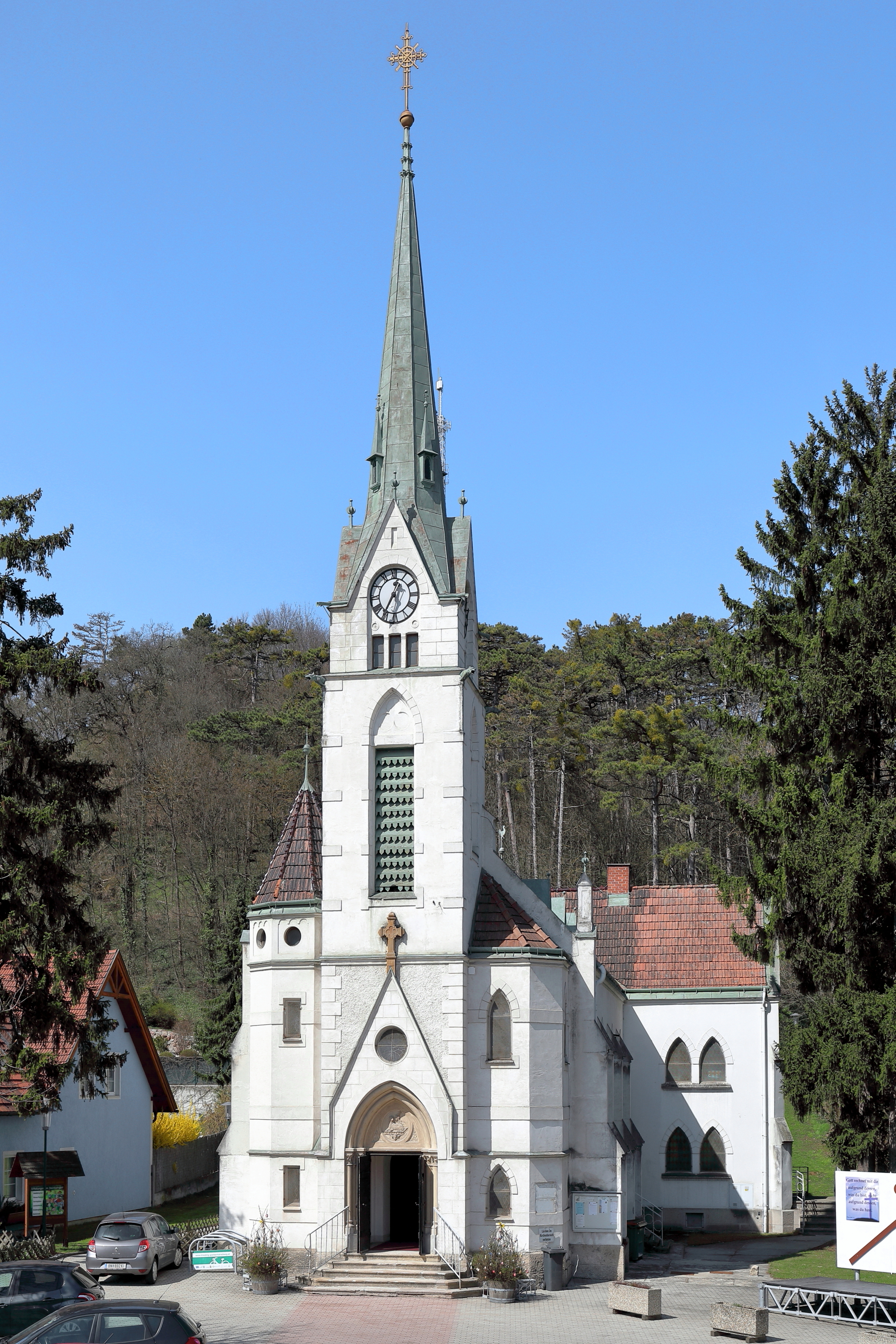
- Hirtenberg parish church

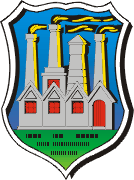
- Coat of arms

- Location within Austria
- Coordinates: 47°55′00″N 16°10′00″E
- Country: Austria
- State: Lower Austria
- District: Baden

Government
  - Mayor: Karl Brandtner (SPÖ)

Area
  - Total: 1.47 km^{2} (0.57 sq mi)
- Elevation: 280 m (920 ft)

Population (2018-01-01)
  - Total: 2,586
  - Density: 1,760/km^{2} (4,560/sq mi)
- Time zone: UTC+1 (CET)
  - Summer (DST): UTC+2 (CEST)
- Postal code: 2552
- Area code: 02256
- Vehicle registration: BN
- Website: www.hirtenberg.at

Hirtenberg is a town of approx. 2,500 inhabitants near Baden bei Wien in Lower Austria, Austria. The river Triesting is located at the south border of the town. Coming from the Vienna Woods, the valley of Triesting joins the Vienna Basin here.

== Neighbourhoods ==
Starting in the east going clockwise the following towns are located next to Hirtenberg:

- Leobersdorf
- Enzesfeld-Lindabrunn
- St. Veit an der Triesting (part of Berndorf)

== Traffic ==
The Leobersdorf railway connecting the Austrian Southern Railway at Leobersdorf with the Austrian Western Railway at St. Pölten runs at the southern border of the town. The train-station of Hirtenberg is located on the area of Enzesfeld. The main road in the town is the federal highway B18 Hainfelder Bundesstraße.

== History ==
The name "Hirtenberg" is derived from the name of a small castle - the Feste Huotto - which was located on a hill overlooking the valley of the Triesting. At the end of the first Turkish war in 1532 the army of Kasim Bey was defeated in the area of Hirtenberg. With the beginning of the 20th century some industrial companies were founded: a weaving company, the Otto Eberhardt Patronenfabrik ammunition factory (with a KZ Mauthausen subcamp), and a steel-producing company. Because of this fact the coat of arms of Hirtenberg contains an industrial building with three chimneys. The big companies are now far smaller and employ far fewer people than before and turned to produce different things like airbag ignitions, steel lockers or car rims.

== Population ==
Historical population
Year	Pop.	±%
1971	2,164	—
1981	2,147	−0.8%
1991	2,088	−2.7%
2001	2,270	+8.7%
2011	2,605	+14.8%

== Public buildings ==
- Federal prison - The fifth biggest prison of Austria, 500 of the 2,300 inhabitants are in fact prisoners.
