= Horn Lil' Trouble =

General information
- Type: Homebuilt aircraft
- National origin: United States of America
- Designer: Mark Horn
- Number built: 1

History
- First flight: 1953

The Horn Lil' Trouble is a single-seat low-wing, homebuilt aircraft designed by Mark Horn.

== Design and development ==
The wings and reversed struts were sourced from a Monocoupe. The fuselage is a modified Aeronca Defender. The landing gear and tail section is from a Piper Cub. The aircraft features dual controls with a jump seat in the baggage compartment that can accommodate a 90 lb (41 kg) or lighter co-pilot.

== Specifications (Horn Lil' Trouble) ==
Data from Sport Aviation

General characteristics

- Length: 17 ft (5.2 m)
- Height: 5 ft 4 in (1.63 m)
- Empty weight: 910 lb (413 kg)
- Fuel capacity: 10 U.S. gallons (38 L; 8.3 imp gal)
- Powerplant: 1 × Continental C-90 , 90 hp (67 kW)
- Propellers: 2-bladed 71-51 McCauley propeller

Performance

- Cruise speed: 143 kn (165 mph, 266 km/h)
- Stall speed: 70 kn (80 mph, 130 km/h)
- Service ceiling: 12,500 ft (3,800 m)
- Rate of climb: 1,700 ft/min (8.6 m/s)
