= Hirtenberg HV.15 =

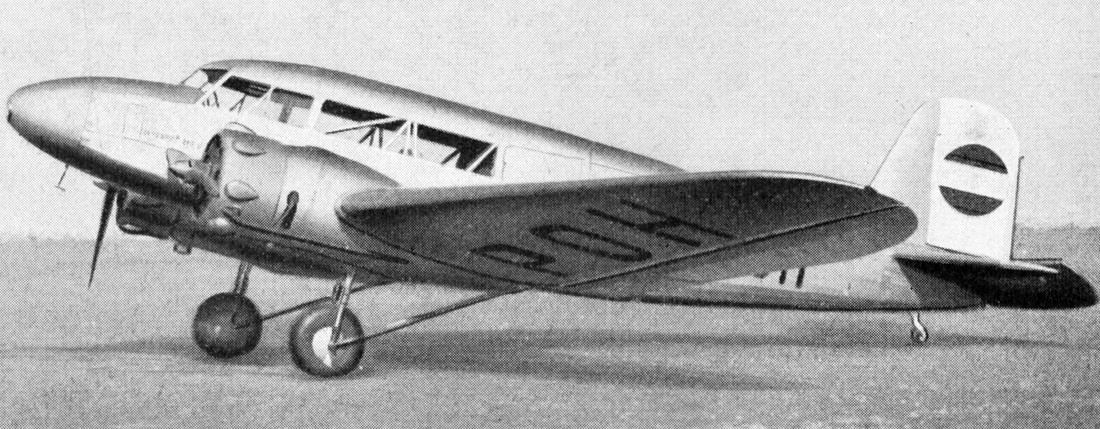

General information
- Type: Passenger aircraft
- National origin: Austria
- Manufacturer: Hirtenberg
- Number built: 1

History
- First flight: March 8, 1936

The Hirtenberg HV.15 was a twin-engine Austrian monoplane produced by Hirtenberg.

== Design and development ==
The HV.15 was the company's first twin-engined aircraft, originally made for the civilian market. Designed for mass production, the aircraft was planned to be a passenger aircraft or light transport. The HV.15 first flew on March 8, 1936, powered by the most powerful engines available to Austria at the time, a pair of Siemens-Halske Sh 14A rotary engine, each producing 160 hp (119 kW).

== Specifications ==
General characteristics

- Crew: 2
- Capacity: 4 passengers
- Length: 10.65 m (34 ft 11 in)
- Wingspan: 15 m (49 ft 3 in)
- Height: 2.9 m (9 ft 6 in)
- Wing area: 33 m^{2} (360 sq ft)
- Empty weight: 1,550 kg (3,417 lb)
- Gross weight: 2,200 kg (4,850 lb)
- Powerplant: 2 × Siemens-Halske Sh 14A radial engine, 120 kW (160 hp) each

Performance

- Maximum speed: 235 km/h (146 mph, 127 kn)
- Cruise speed: 198 km/h (123 mph, 107 kn)
- Range: 900 km (560 mi, 490 nmi)
- Service ceiling: 5,200 m (17,100 ft)
