= Holleville RH.1 Bambi =

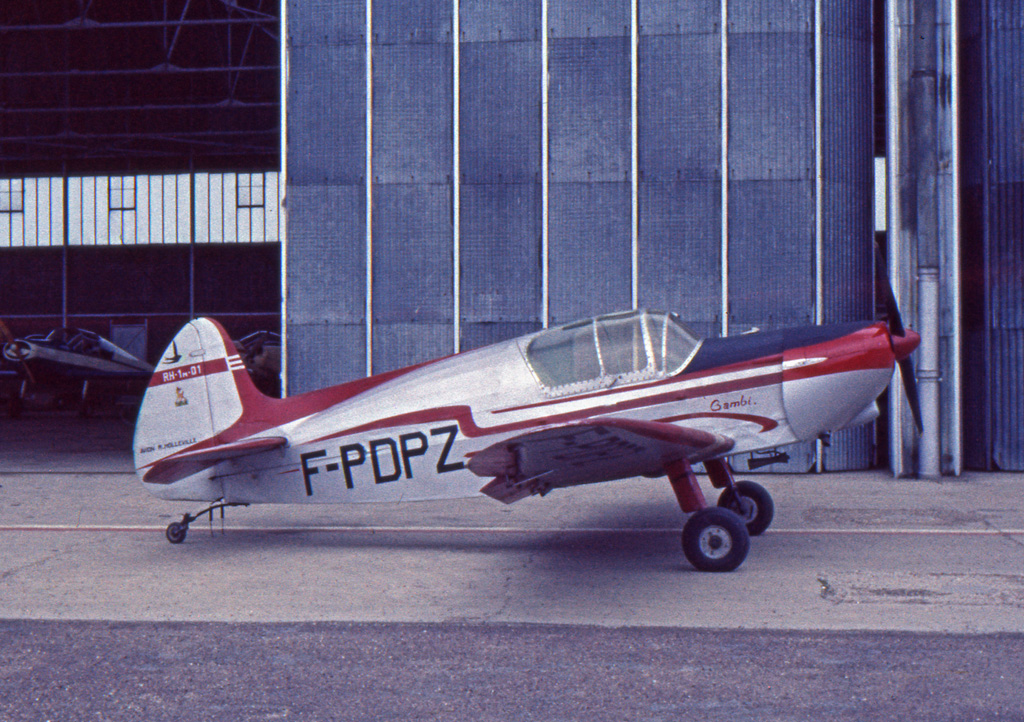
- The RH.1 Bambi at Guyancourt airfield in 1963

General information
- Type: light sporting aircraft
- National origin: France
- Manufacturer: Roger Holleville
- Designer: Roger Holleville
- Status: preserved airworthy
- Primary user: the builder
- Number built: one

History
- Introduction date: 1953
- First flight: 27 July 1953

The Holleville RH.1 Bambi is a French-built light sporting aircraft of the 1950s.

== Development and design ==
The RH.1 Bambi was designed and built by Monsieur Roger Holleville and flown for the first time in 1953. It is a side-by-side two-seat aircraft and was unusual at the time to be among self-build types to make extensive use of synthetic resins and sandwich construction. It was originally intended to make construction plans available to clubs and groups. However, the rather sophisticated design motivated against the acceptance of the Bambi by amateur constructors.

The Bambi is basically of wooden construction and the exceptional cleanliness of the overall design results in an outstanding performance on a 65 h.p. engine.

The aircraft has a low-wing layout and a fixed tail-wheel undercarriage.

== Operational history ==
The Bambi was initially operated by its designer from Guyancourt airfield to the west of Paris. By 1964 it was owned by Monsieur Gerard Chaplain and based at St Dizier.

It has visited the United Kingdom to attend light aircraft rallies including at Biggin Hill airport in Kent in 1967. The Bambi is preserved in airworthy condition in the Musee Regional de l'Air at Angers Aerodrome, 20 km north east of the town.

== Specifications ==
Data from The Aircraft of the World (1965 Ed.)

General characteristics

- Crew: 1
- Capacity: 1 passenger
- Length: 6.71 m (22 ft 0 in)
- Wingspan: 8.38 m (27 ft 6 in)
- Height: 2.24 m (7 ft 4 in)
- Wing area: 9.9 m^{2} (107 sq ft)
- Empty weight: 289 kg (637 lb)
- Gross weight: 499 kg (1,100 lb)
- Powerplant: 1 × Continental A65 piston, 48 kW (65 hp)

Performance

- Maximum speed: 200 km/h (124 mph, 108 kn)
- Cruise speed: 169 km/h (105 mph, 91 kn)
- Endurance: 4.5 hours
- Service ceiling: 4,500 m (14,700 ft)
- Rate of climb: 5.5 m/s (1,080 ft/min)
