= Hopfner HS-10/32 =

HS-10/32 and HS-10/33
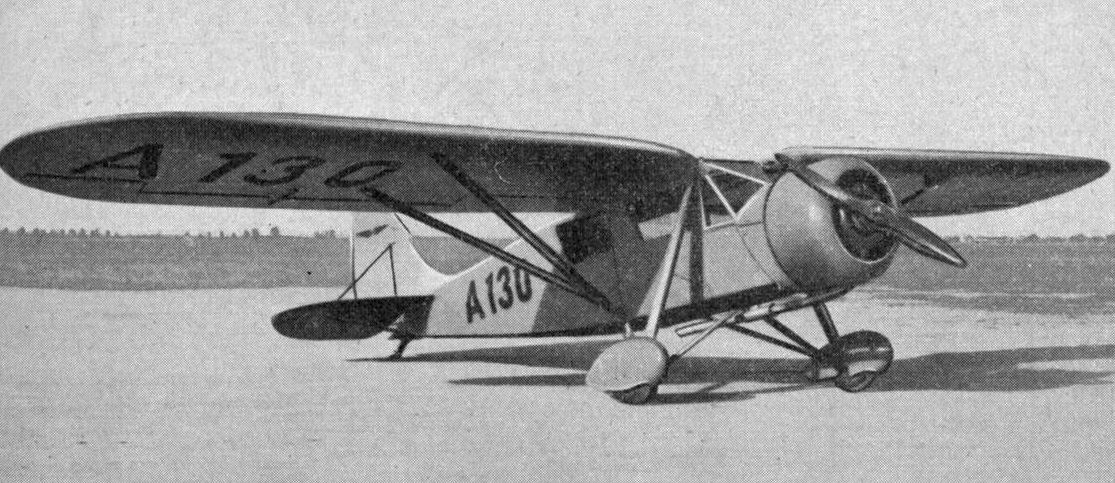

General information
- Type: Airliner
- National origin: Austria
- Manufacturer: Hopfner
- Designer: Theodor Hopfner
- Number built: 4

History
- First flight: 1932

The Hopfner HS-10/32 was a utility aircraft built in Austria in the early 1930s. It was a conventional, high-wing, strut-braced cabin monoplane derived from Hopfner's series of parasol-wing light aircraft that began with the HS-5/28. Three examples (including the single prototype) flew in late 1932 under the designation HS-10/32, followed by a single example of the improved HS-10/33 the following year, a generally similar aircraft with revised ailerons. The HS-10/33 was eventually purchased by the Austrian Air Force to use as a liaison machine.

== Specifications (HS-10/32) ==
General characteristics

- Crew: One pilot
- Capacity: 1 passenger
- Length: 10.96 m (36 ft 0 in)
- Wingspan: 8.02 m (26 ft 4 in)
- Height: 2.39 m (7 ft 10 in)
- Wing area: 18.0 m^{2} (194 sq ft)
- Empty weight: 640 kg (1,410 lb)
- Gross weight: 1,000 kg (2,200 lb)
- Powerplant: 1 × Siemens Sh 14A , 110 kW (150 hp)

Performance

- Maximum speed: 190 km/h (120 mph, 100 kn)
- Range: 840 km (525 mi, 456 nmi)
- Service ceiling: 4,500 m (14,800 ft)
