= Huntington Governor =

Two Seater Monoplane

Governor
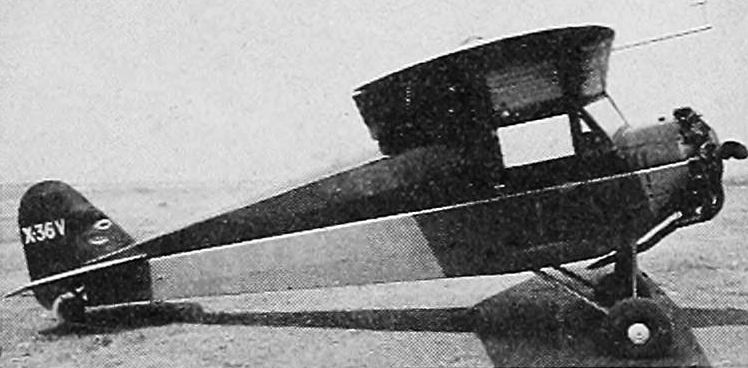

General information
- National origin: United States
- Manufacturer: Huntington Aircraft Co.
- Number built: 3

History
- First flight: c.1930

The Huntington H-11 Governor was a two-seat cabin monoplane with a high, cantilever wing built in the United States and first flown around 1930. Three were completed.

== Design and development ==
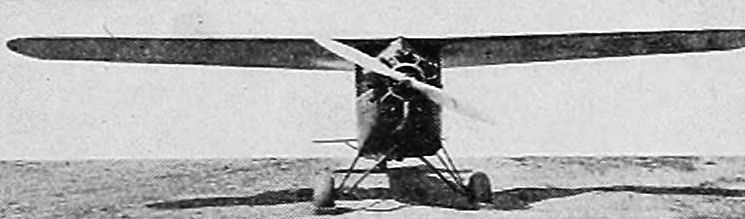
Huntington Governor

The Governor was a side-by-side, cantilever high wing monoplane, designed for business or pleasure. It was unusually aerodynamically clean as its cantilever wing, mounted on top of the fuselage, had no external struts. The wing had a straight leading edge and tapered out to blunted tips.

The fuselage structure was rectangular in section but its decking was polyangular. The Governor prototype was powered by a 110 hp (82 kW) Warner Scarab seven cylinder radial engine, though the 120 hp (89 kW) Chevrolet D-4 (later called the Martin 4-333) air-cooled, inverted four cylinder inline or 125 hp (93 kW) Kinner B-5 five cylinder radial were options. Pilot and passenger sat side by side behind it in an underwing, windowed cabin accessed by large doors. The tail was conventional with a tailplane, braced from below, on top of the fuselage and a cropped triangular fin and rounded balanced rudder.

The main undercarriage was a split-axle design with the axles from the fuselage central underside. Their outer ends were mounted on V-struts from the lower fuselage longerons. There was a small and semi-enclosed tailwheel.

The date of the Governor's first flight is not known. The prototype was largely complete by the time of the August 1930 Aero Digest article, though its photo shows instrument panel gaps. Three were built, the last a Kinner-powered H-11K, but their later activities are not known.

== Specifications ==
Data from Aero Digest, August 1930

General characteristics

- Crew: one
- Capacity: one passenger
- Length: 33 ft 5 in (10.19 m)
- Wingspan: 22 ft 6.5 in (6.871 m)
- Height: 8 ft 4 in (2.54 m)
- Wing area: 178 sq ft (16.5 m^{2})
- Empty weight: 1,020 lb (463 kg)
- Gross weight: 1,650 lb (748 kg)
- Powerplant: 1 × Warner Scarab 7 cylinder radial, 110 hp (82 kW) at 1,850 rpm
- Propellers: 2-bladed

Performance

- Maximum speed: 120 mph (190 km/h, 100 kn)
- Cruise speed: 100 mph (160 km/h, 87 kn)
- Landing speed: 49 mph (79 km/h; 43 kn)
- Range: 550 mi (890 km, 480 nmi) at cruising speed
