= Hopfner HV-4/28 =

HV-4/28

General information
- Type: Airliner
- National origin: Austria
- Manufacturer: Hopfner
- Designer: Theodor Hopfner
- Primary user: Rundflugunternehmen Theodor Hopfner
- Number built: 1

History
- First flight: 25 July 1929

The Hopfner HV-4/28 was a small airliner built in Austria in the late 1920s. An enlarged version of the HV-3/27, it was a conventional, high-wing cantilever monoplane with a fully enclosed cabin. A single example was built in 1928 and saw heavy use by the airline that year. In 1929, it received a major refurbishment that included a change or powerplant from the original Heiro to a Gnome et Rhône 9A Jupiter engine and was sold to a private owner under the new designation HV-8/29GR. This aircraft was still flying at the time of the Anschluß, after which it received a new German registration.

== Specifications (HV-4/28) ==
General characteristics

- Crew: One pilot
- Capacity: 4 passengers
- Length: 11.00 m (36 ft 1 in)
- Wingspan: 16.20 m (53 ft 2 in)
- Height: 3.30 m (10 ft 10 in)
- Wing area: 42.0 m^{2} (452 sq ft)
- Empty weight: 1,390 kg (3,060 lb)
- Gross weight: 1,970 kg (4,340 lb)
- Powerplant: 1 × Hiero 6 , 170 kW (230 hp)

Performance

- Maximum speed: 125 km/h (78 mph, 68 kn)
- Cruise speed: 108 km/h (67 mph, 58 kn)
- Endurance: 6 hours 30 minutes
