= HTM Skytrac =

Skytrac / Skyrider
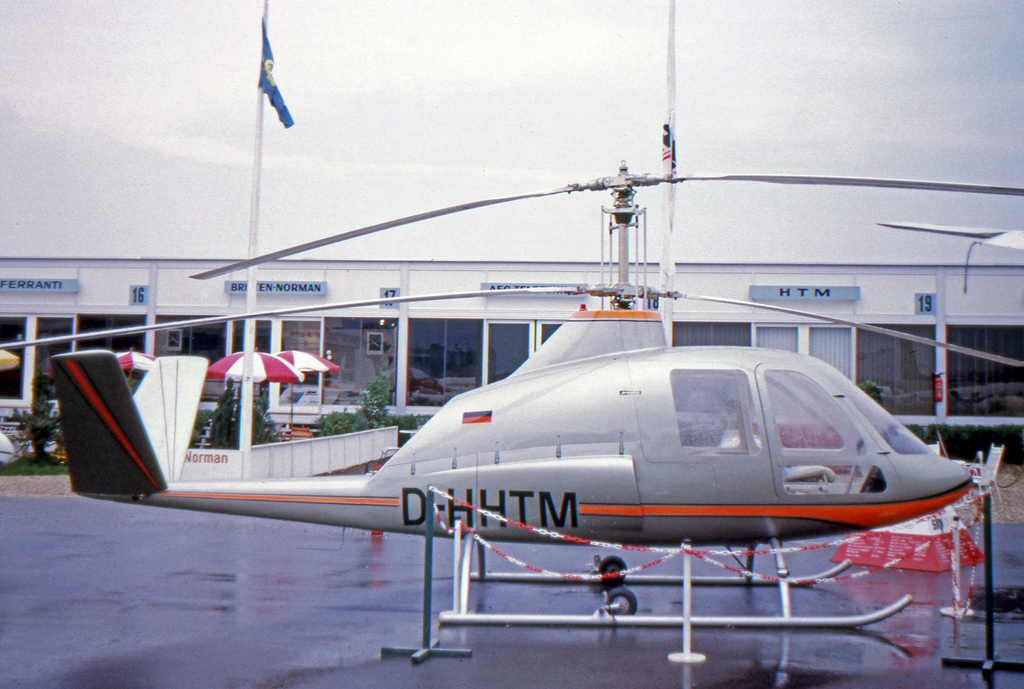
- HTM Skyrider exhibited at the 1973 Paris Air Show

General information
- Type: Utility helicopter
- National origin: Germany
- Manufacturer: Wagner, HTM
- Primary user: Manufacturer

History
- First flight: July 1965
- Variant: Elecpro RU series

The HTM Skytrac (originally known as the Wagner Skytrac) was a light utility helicopter developed in Germany in the 1960s and 70s. A later four-seat version was known as the Skyrider. Despite achieving certification from the German aviation authorities and firm orders from customers, the Skytrac was never produced in series.

== Design and development ==
Development commenced in the mid-1960s as an offshoot of the Wagner firm's attempts to develop a roadable helicopter, and utilised the same coaxial dynamic components that had been developed for that project. The Skytrac featured a narrow single-seat cabin at one end of a box-like "keel" structure, a horizontally mounted Franklin flat-6 engine at the other end, and the transmission and rotor mast between them. The pilot's seat was enclosed by a sliding, bubble canopy. The prototype flew in this form in July 1965, and it was exhibited and flown at the 1966 Hannover Air Show.

The Skytrac 1 was followed by a second machine with pontoons and a V-tail at the end of a boom for improved directional control. The third prototype had three seats in a more conventional cabin structure, and was fitted with spray bars and chemical tanks for demonstration of the type's potential as an agricultural machine. Certification of the design was achieved in 1969.

In 1971, the newly formed Helikopter Technik München (HTM) took over the manufacture and marketing of the Skytrac, announcing in mid-1972 that a production line was being established at Jesenwang with the intention of producing 35 machines by the end of 1973, all of which had found buyers. After this initial batch, HTM planned to sell licences to produce the design in batches of 30 machines each. None of this was to come to pass, however, as HTM was unable to finance the production of the first batch of aircraft.

The final development was the Skyrider, which enclosed the Skytrac into a full fuselage with seating for four. Mockups of this configuration were displayed at the Hanover and Cannes airshows in 1972. A prototype was exhibited at the June 1973 Paris Air Show and flown in February 1974. It was possible to convert the basic Skytrac into a Skyrider in a matter of only a few hours' work. By the following year, however, HTM was out of business, and no further examples of their helicopter designs were ever constructed.

Since 1992, all the rights for production and design of the Skytrac and Skyrider helicopters are owned by Peter Chrobak. In 2014, Chrobak sold all of the designs and rights of production to a Chinese manufacturer Guangdong Elecpro Electric Appliance Holding Co., Ltd. for a total of 2.52 million Euros, and based on the technology purchased, the Chinese manufacturer not only produced the original crewed version, but also developed its own RU series uncrewed versions.

== Specifications (Skytrac 3) ==
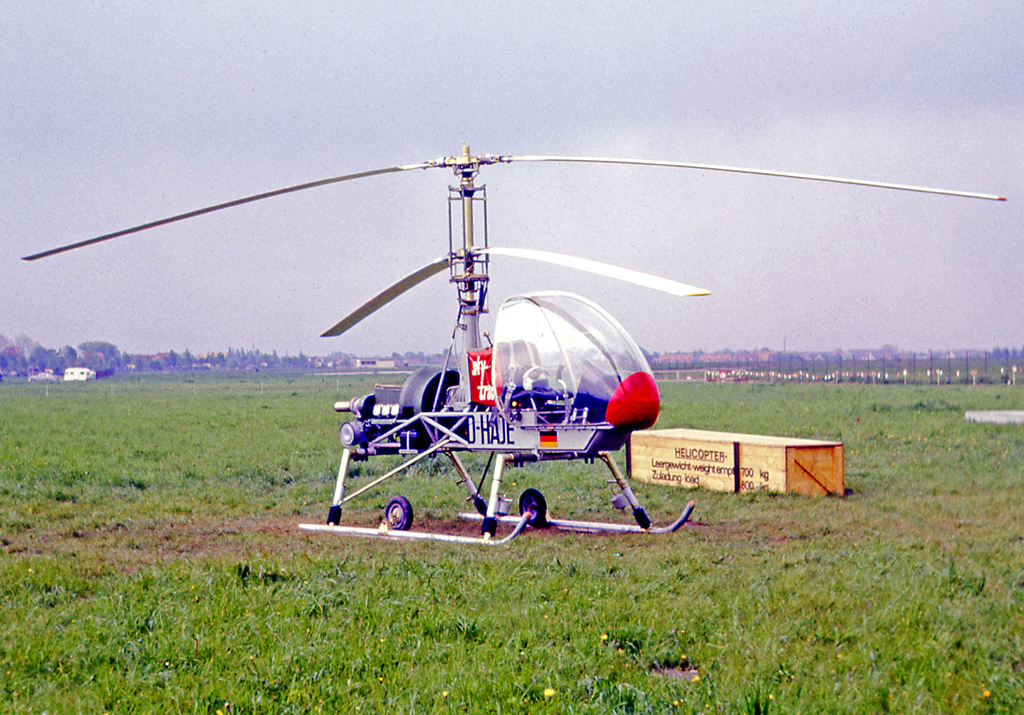
The prototype single-seat Wagner Skytrac 1 at the 1966 Hannover Air Show.

Data from Jane's All the World's Aircraft 1971–72

General characteristics

- Crew: 1
- Capacity: 2
- Length: 7.10 m (23 ft 4 in) (overall length)
- Height: 3.60 m (11 ft 10 in)
- Empty weight: 920 kg (2,028 lb)
- Max takeoff weight: 1,500 kg (3,307 lb)
- Powerplant: 1 × Franklin 6AS-335-A air-cooled six-cylinder horizontally-opposed engine
- Main rotor diameter: 2 × 10.00 m (32 ft 10 in)
- Main rotor area: 157.2 m^{2} (1,692 sq ft)

Performance

- Maximum speed: 160 km/h (99 mph, 86 kn)
- Cruise speed: 140 km/h (87 mph, 76 kn)
- Range: 400 km (250 mi, 220 nmi) with auxiliary tank
- Service ceiling: 3,860 m (12,650 ft)
- Rate of climb: 6 m/s (1,200 ft/min)

== See also ==
Related lists

- List of rotorcraft
