= Hopfner HV-3/27 =

HV-3/27

General information
- Type: Airliner
- National origin: Austria
- Manufacturer: Hopfner
- Designer: Theodor Hopfner
- Primary user: Rundflugunternehmen Theodor Hopfner
- Number built: 1

History
- First flight: 1927

The Hopfner HV-3/27 was a small airliner built in Austria in the late 1920s. A development of the HV-2, it was a conventional, high-wing cantilever monoplane with a fully enclosed cabin and a strong resemblance to the contemporary Fokker F.II. A single example was built in 1927 and used by Hopfner's own airline until 1934.

== Specifications ==
Data from Jane's all the World's Aircraft 1928

General characteristics

- Crew: 1
- Capacity: 4 pax
- Length: 10.5 m (34 ft 5 in)
- Wingspan: 16.4 m (53 ft 10 in)
- Height: 3.3 m (10 ft 10 in)
- Wing area: 36 m^{2} (390 sq ft)
- Empty weight: 1,380 kg (3,042 lb)
- Gross weight: 2,080 kg (4,586 lb)
- Powerplant: 1 × Hiero E 6-cylinder water-cooled in-line piston engine, 170 kW (230 hp)
- Propellers: 2-bladed wooden fixed pitch propeller

Performance

- Endurance: 6
