= Otto Eberhardt Patronenfabrik =

Austrian company

- Industry: cartridge and metal fabrication
- Headquarters: Hirtenberg, Lower Austria, Austria
- Key people: Otto Eberhardt
- Parent: Gustloff-Werke - Waffenwerk Suhl

External images
- Proof mark P635 headstamp mark 8mm Mauser ammo box

Otto Eberhardt Patronenfabrik (English: "Otto Eberhardt Cartridge Factory") was a munitions company established in 1860. The company's Hirtenberger Patronen, Zündhütchen und Metallwarenfabrik (English: "cartridge, primer and metalware fabrication in Hirtenberg") near Wiener Neustadt (proofmark "am") used forced labor during World War II from a sub-camp of the Mauthausen-Gusen concentration camp and produced ammunition including 9×19mm Parabellum (pistol and submachine gun) and 8 mm Mauser (rifle) cartridges. The company also had a factory in Ronsdorf near Wuppertal (proofmark "ap") which produced rifles. Additional Gustloff facilities were in Meiningen and Weimar.

== Hirtenberg aircraft ==
Otto Eberhardt Patronenfabrik also purchased the assets of the Hopfner aircraft company in 1935. They continued production of both de Havilland- and Siemens-powered aircraft under the Hirtenberg brand. They produced the Hirtenberg HS.9 under their brand.

== Unbuilt projects ==
From

- Hopfner H.A.M.11 (amphibious twin-engine aircraft based on H.A.11/33)
- H.M.15 (six-seat, twin-engine military aircraft based on the HV.15)
