= Hopfner HV-6/28 =

HV-6/28

General information
- Type: Airliner
- National origin: Austria
- Manufacturer: Hopfner
- Designer: Theodor Hopfner
- Primary user: Aero St. Gallen
- Number built: 1

History
- First flight: 1929

The Hopfner HV-6/28 was a small airliner built in Austria in the late 1920s for Swiss use. Unrelated to Hopfner's other airliners of the period, the HV-6/28 was a conventional, high-wing, strut-braced monoplane with a fully enclosed cabin. The main units of the fixed tailskid undercarriage were divided. The single example built was flown by Aero St. Gallen between 1929 and 1931, and then scrapped.

== Specifications ==
General characteristics

- Crew: One pilot
- Capacity: 6 passengers
- Length: 10.00 m (32 ft 10 in)
- Wingspan: 16.00 m (52 ft 6 in)
- Height: 2.90 m (9 ft 6 in)
- Wing area: 36.4 m^{2} (392 sq ft)
- Empty weight: 1,113 kg (2,449 lb)
- Gross weight: 1,950 kg (4,290 lb)
- Powerplant: 1 × Walter Castor , 180 kW (240 hp)

Performance

- Maximum speed: 194 km/h (123 mph, 107 kn)
- Range: 250 km (160 mi, 140 nmi)
- Service ceiling: 3,500 m (11,500 ft)
