= Hopfner HS-5/28 =

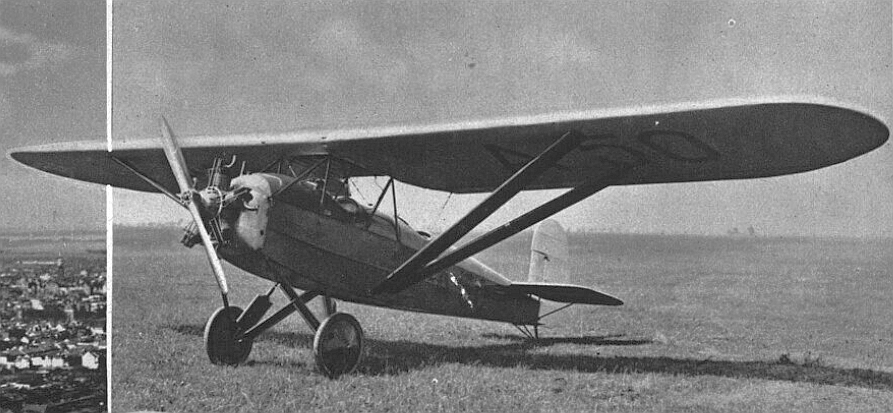
- Hopfner with engine Walter NZ-60

General information
- Type: Utility aircraft
- National origin: Austria
- Manufacturer: Hopfner
- Designer: Theodor Hopfner
- Number built: 4

History
- First flight: July 1928

The Hopfner HS-5/28 was a utility aircraft built in Austria in the late 1920s. It was a conventional, parasol-wing monoplane with seating for two occupants in tandem, open cockpits. The landing gear was of fixed, tailskid type with divided main units. Two examples were built with Walter NZ60 engines, followed by two more with the more powerful NZ85 for Swiss aeroclub use. One of these latter machines remained in service until 1934.

== Variants ==
- HS-5/28 - version with NZ60 engine
- HS-5/28a - version with NZ85 engine

== Specifications (HS-5/28) ==
Data from Jane's all the World's Aircraft 1928

General characteristics

- Crew: 1
- Capacity: 1
- Length: 7.4 m (24 ft 3 in)
- Wingspan: 11.26 m (36 ft 11 in)
- Width: 3.1 m (10 ft 2 in) wings folded
- Height: 2.55 m (8 ft 4 in)
- Wing area: 19.8 m^{2} (213 sq ft)
- Empty weight: 385 kg (849 lb)
- Gross weight: 615 kg (1,356 lb)
- Max takeoff weight: 770 kg (1,698 lb)
- Powerplant: 1 × Walter NZ60 5-cylinder air-cooled radial piston engine, 45 kW (60 hp)
- Propellers: 2-bladed wooden fixed-pitch propeller

Performance

- Maximum speed: 148 km/h (92 mph, 80 kn)
- Landing speed: 50 km/h (31 mph; 27 kn)
- Range: 2,160 km (1,340 mi, 1,170 nmi) with maximum load
- Time to altitude: 1,000 m (3,300 ft) in 9 minutes
- Wing loading: 31 kg/m^{2} (6.3 lb/sq ft) normal; 38.8 kg/m^{2} (7.9 lb/sq ft)
- Power/mass: 17.16 kg/kW (28.2 lb/hp)
