= I.Ae. 25 Mañque =

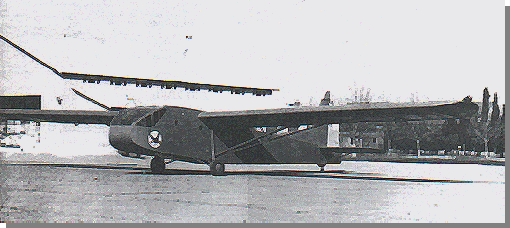

General information
- Type: Transport glider
- National origin: Argentina
- Manufacturer: Instituto Aerotecnico de Cordoba
- Number built: 1

History
- First flight: 1945

The I.Ae. 25 Mañque (en: Vulture) was an Argentine assault troop/cargo glider designed at the Instituto Aerotecnico de Cordoba. The prototype was finished on 11 August 1945, flying only once before it was cancelled. Its structure was constructed with Argentine woods mañio, araucaria and guatambú.

Its design was based on the American military glider CG-4A Waco, its exterior configuration being very similar. It had a crew of two and carried 13 fully loaded soldiers.

== Specifications ==
General characteristics

- Crew: two
- Capacity: 13 troops
- Length: 17.40 m (57 ft 1 in)
- Wingspan: 25.5 m (83 ft 8 in)
- Height: 3.84 m (12 ft 7 in)
- Wing area: 79.1 m^{2} (85.1 sq ft)
- Empty weight: 2,460 kg (5,410 lb)
- Gross weight: 3,580 kg (7,880 lb)

Performance

- Maximum speed: 220 km/h (140 mph, 120 kn)

== See also ==
- Altinger Lenticular 15S
- I.Ae. 34 Clen Antú
- I.Ae. 41 Urubú

Aircraft of comparable role, configuration, and era

- CG-4A Waco
- Airspeed Horsa
