= I.Ae. 34 Clen Antú =

Clen Antú
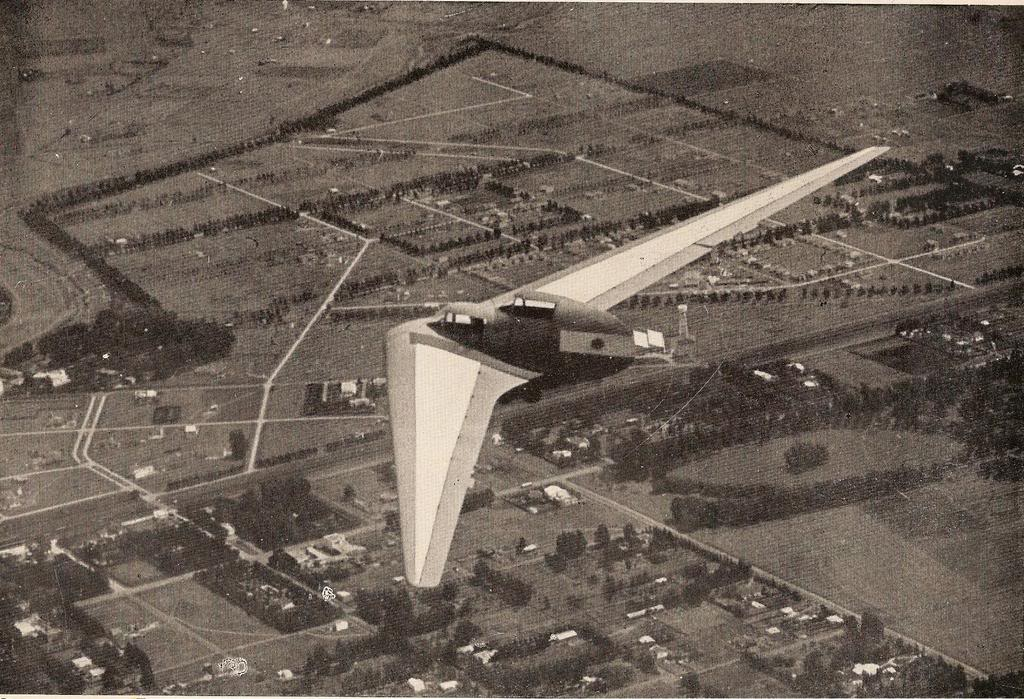
- I.Ae.34 Clen Antú

General information
- Type: Tailless glider
- National origin: Argentina
- Manufacturer: Instituto Aerotecnico, Cordoba
- Designer: Reimar Horten
- Number built: 6

History
- First flight: 20 June 1949

The I.Ae. 34 Clen Antú, sometimes known as the Horten XVa after its designer Reimar Horten, was a two-seat tailless glider built in Argentina. Two single-seat variants competed unsuccessfully in the 1952 World Gliding Championships.

== Design and development ==
Between 1946 and 1956 the Fabrica Miitar de Aviones of Córdoba, Argentina was known as the Instituto Aerotecnico (I.Ae.). During that immediately post-World War II period, it had on its staff several designers who had worked with the Nazi regime. These included Émile Dewoitine, Kurt Tank and Reimar Horten, the latter best known with his brother for their interest in tailless aircraft. His I.Ae.34 Clen Antú was recognisably one of the glider family that contained the Horten IV and Horten VI, though smaller than both. Clen Antú means Sun Ray in Mapudungun, a language spoken in some areas of Argentina and Chile. According to one source, the Clen Antú was intended as an aerodynamic model of a four-engined flying wing transport, the I.Ae 38 Naranjero. Others state it was intended as a training glider for clubs.

The Clen Antú was a pure tailless glider, a flying wing apart from a central accommodation pod. It had a high aspect ratio (about 17) wing, swept at 23.67^{o} at quarter chord, with no vertical airfoil surfaces. The chord decreased along the span to 20% of the root value at the tip, and the wing carried a dihedral of about 3.5^{o}. Broad chord tabbed control surfaces filled the trailing edge from the tip to about half-span and airbrakes were fitted. The accommodation pod was narrow but tall, providing fully instrumented tandem dual control positions. The forward pilot sat in a glazed cockpit on the wing near its leading edge, with the second seated in his own enclosed cockpit stepped above and behind the first. Aft of the cockpits the plywood pod ended in a flat oval shape which provided some yaw stability. The pod continued below the wing containing a tandem pair of wheels with brakes at the rear and skids below the nose.

The first flight was made on 20 June 1949. Four of these two-seaters were built, one used to explore unconventional control surfaces.

Two more were built later for the Second International Glider Competition held in Madrid, Spain in 1952. These were single-seaters designated I.Ae.34 M (for Monoplace), though at the competition they were recorded as Horten XV. The accommodation pod was smaller, though still relatively tall and narrow; the pilot sat near midwing under a removable section that was part wooden fairing, part glazing. Underneath the wing the pod, which now contained a single wheel, reached forward only to midwing. The undercarriage was completed by a nosewheel that retracted into the leading edge of the wing. The single-seater was 25 kg (55 lb) lighter than the I.Ae34. The I.Ae.34 Ms did not distinguish themselves in the competition, which was dominated by the Slingsby Skys, failing to finish in the top twelve. Both suffered landing damage in practice, attributed to their "long undercarriage". One was withdrawn before the start of the competition proper, and the second was damaged and withdrawn on day 4.

=== Horten notation ===
Some sources use the Horten notation, in which the I.Ae. 34 is the Horten XVa, the I.Ae. 34 M is the Horten XVb and the I.Ae. 41 the Horten XVc.

== Specifications (I.Ae. 34a) ==
Data from

General characteristics

- Crew: two
- Length: 4.40 m (14 ft 5 in) length over the pod was 3.50 m (11 ft 6 in)
- Wingspan: 18.0 m (59 ft 1 in)
- Height: 1.6 m (5 ft 3 in)
- Wing area: 18.9 m^{2} (203 sq ft)
- Aspect ratio: 17.1
- Empty weight: 270 kg (595 lb)
- Max takeoff weight: 430 kg (948 lb)
- Leading edge sweepback: 21.8 degrees
- Aerofoil thickness: 18%

Performance

- Never exceed speed: 250 km/h (160 mph, 130 kn)
- Towing speed: 65 km/h (40 mph)
- Landing speed: 65 km/h (40 mph)
- Maximum glide ratio: 1:28.5 at 88 km/h (55 mph) and 22.7 kg/m^{2} (4.6 lb/sq ft)
- Rate of sink: 0.75 m/s (148 ft/min) at 70 km/h (43 mph) and 22.7 kg/m^{2} (4.6 lb/sq ft)
- Wing loading: 22.7 kg/m^{2} (4.6 lb/sq ft)

== See also ==
- Altinger Lenticular 15S
- I.Ae. 25 Mañque
- I.Ae. 41 Urubú
- Nike PUL 9

Related lists

- list of gliders I.Ae.
