= Horten H.II =

German flying wing glider

Horten H.II Habicht
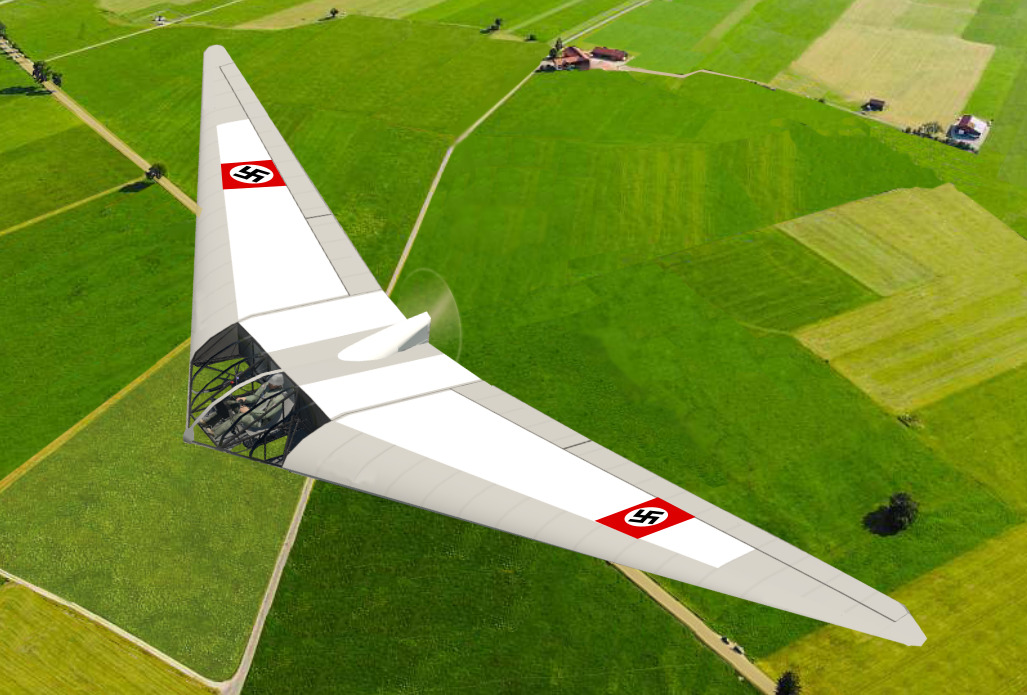
- A modified H.II with a Hirth HM.60R motor in a pusher configuration

General information
- Type: Flying wing glider and motorglider
- National origin: Germany
- Designer: Walter and Reimar Horten, who also built it
- Number built: 4

History
- First flight: July 1935

The Horten H.II Habicht (Hawk) was a German flying wing glider built in Germany in 1935. Four, including one flown mostly as a motorglider, were built. One of the gliders was used to test the aerodynamics of a prototype World War II Horten jet fighter-bomber.

== Design ==
The Horten brothers' first glider, the H.I, was a true flying wing without any vertical surfaces or fuselage which had flown for seven hours at the 1934 Rhön competition on the Wasserkuppe. It had attracted much interest, gaining a DM600 "Construction Prize", but was hard to control and made only one competitive flight. The brothers "abandoned and burned it on the Wasserkuppe". In the next nine months, helped by the prize, they built the Horten H.II which had a wing of greater span and higher aspect ratio than the shallow delta of the Horten I, with sweep on the trailing edges as well. With improved yaw control it flew much better, though a test report from Hanna Reitsch made it clear that more work was required.

The Habicht had a thick, reflex section wing, with a maximum thickness/chord ratio of 20% at the root and 10% near the tips. It had a quarter-chord sweep of 26°, 3° of dihedral and 7° of washout. It was in three parts with a central section, built on steel tubes, and two wooden outer panels. The latter had single spars and plywood covered leading edges, forming torsion-resisting D-boxes.

In the absence of a conventional rudder the Habicht had drag rudders. These were leading edge flaps placed near the tips and formed by mounting the leading edge surfaces on a hinge so they could open upwards and downwards (those of the Horten H.I had extended downwards only). Their differential operational controlled yaw and they served as conventional airbrakes when opened together. The whole trailing edge was occupied by control surfaces; the outer panels had elevons outboard and landing flaps inboard and there were further landing flaps on the centre section. Rear control surfaces were assisted by Flettner servo tabs and were ply covered.

The seat in the Habicht was strongly reclined and positioned the pilot entirely within the 700 mm (28 in) maximum thickness of the central wing profile. In place of a canopy the leading edge near the cockpit was covered on each side in transparent Cellon.

The Habicht had tandem wheel landing gear; the forward wheel, fitted with a brake, was mounted on a long fork and retracted by being swung backward so it was semi-protruding from the fuselage. The fixed rear wheel was below the trailing edge, half within a large fairing which was rectangular ahead of the wheel and raked behind. This probably acted as a short-coupled fin.

== Development ==
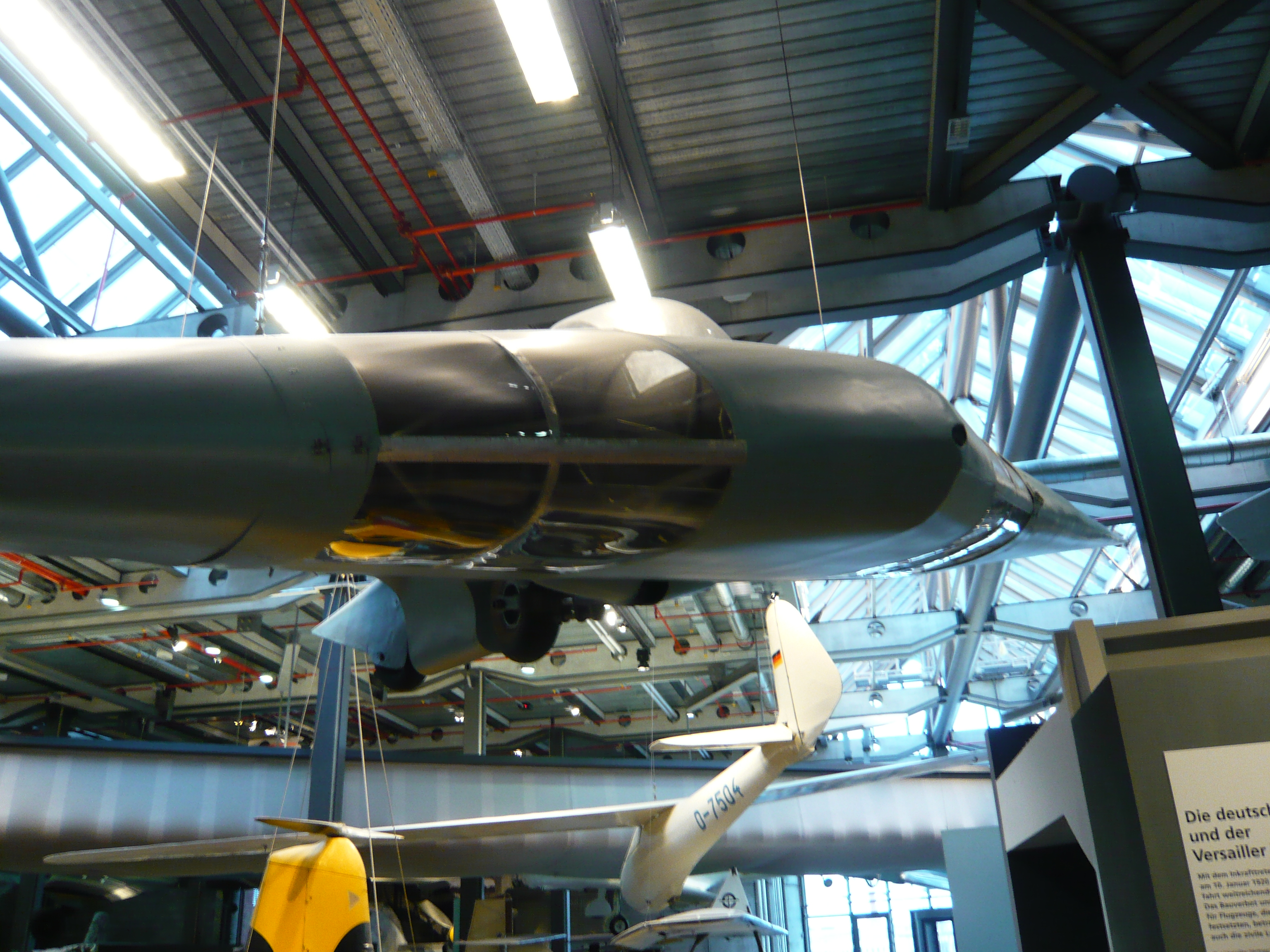
The landing gear (retracted) of the Horten H.IIL

The first Horten H.II was completed as a glider in May 1935 and flew shortly after, too late for the 1935 Rhön contest. It was soon flying as a motorglider, designated H.IIM powered by a pusher configuration Hirth HM 60R air-cooled, inverted, four cylinder, inline engine, mounted on top of the wing. The engine increased the empty weight by 110 kg (240 lb) and enabled a maximum speed in level flight of 200 km/h (120 mph), but increased the minimum sink rate to 0.8 m/s (2.6 ft/s). To clear the propeller, the rear wheel fairing was altered to have a squarer profile. In 1937 the borrowed engine had to be returned, ending the career of the first Habicht.

The Luftwaffe became aware of Horten's work during tests of the Horten H.V, a twin engine aircraft with military potential, and ordered three more Horten II motorgliders. Designated Horten H.IIL, they had slightly increased washout and a more upright seat. The pilot's head was now above the wing under a 300 mm (12 in) high clear perspex canopy. The alterations increased the weight by 30 kg (66 lb). The first two of these were built in 1937 and the decision was made to enter them as gliders in the annual Rhön contest. Their performance there were not outstanding as their wing loading was too low to reach the speeds necessary for rapid cross country flights between thermals.

The third Horten H.IIL was test flown in November 1938 by Hanna Reitsch, who reported that whilst comfort was "not exceptional", the "view is bad" (even with the new canopy), entry and exit were "only possible for athletes" and that the undercarriage retraction lever could only be operated by pilots with longer arms than hers. It achieved a soaring flight of 260 km (160 mi) in 1938.

That example was destroyed in a fatal accident in March 1939. Witnesses described how the canopy detached during a high-speed dive in aerobatics practice, hitting pilot Kurt Hiekmann.

Encouraged by the military, the Hortens concentrated on the Horten H.III as a competitor in the 1938 Rhön, where the H.IILs were used only for pilot training. Nonetheless, D-10-125, the first of the H.IILs, was continuously modified. One of the first changes was to the central leading edge transparencies, which were reduced to two separate panels on either side of ply skinning. Early photographs of it show a fully transparent leading edge and later images the revisions. It was much involved in the 1944 development of the Horten IX twin-jet fighter-bomber; most notably it was flown as a "wind-tunnel substitute" for the H.IX V-6, with its extended, pointed nose, dummy air-intakes and exhausts, and twin small fins. A photograph also exists of it with the intakes but not the pointed nose. D-10-125 is now on display, restored to an earlier form, in the Deutsches Technikmuseum, Berlin.

== Variants ==
Horten II
Original glider version from 1935, flown summer 1935.

Horten IIM
The original version modified into a motorglider with a pusher configuration Hirth HM.60R, flown from autumn 1935 to 1937.

Horten IIL
Three built in 1937–1938 for the Luftwaffe, with canopy, upright seat and slightly increased washout.

== Aircraft on display ==
- Deutsches Technikmuseum, Berlin: Horten IIL D-10-125.

== Specifications (Horten IIL) ==
Data from Nurflügel (2012)

General characteristics

- Crew: One
- Wingspan: 16.5 m (54 ft 2 in)
- Wing area: 32 m^{2} (340 sq ft)
- Aspect ratio: 8.5
- Empty weight: 250 kg (551 lb)
- Max takeoff weight: 330 kg (728 lb)

Performance

- Never exceed speed: 230 km/h (140 mph, 120 kn)
- Maximum glide ratio: 1:24 at 72 km/h (45 mph; 39 kn) and 10.3 kg/m^{2} (2.1 lb/sq ft)
- Rate of sink: 0.7 m/s (140 ft/min) minimum, at 72 km/h (45 mph; 39 kn) and 10.3 kg/m^{2} (2.1 lb/sq ft)
