= Fieseler Fi 5 =

German single-engine sportplane

Fi 5
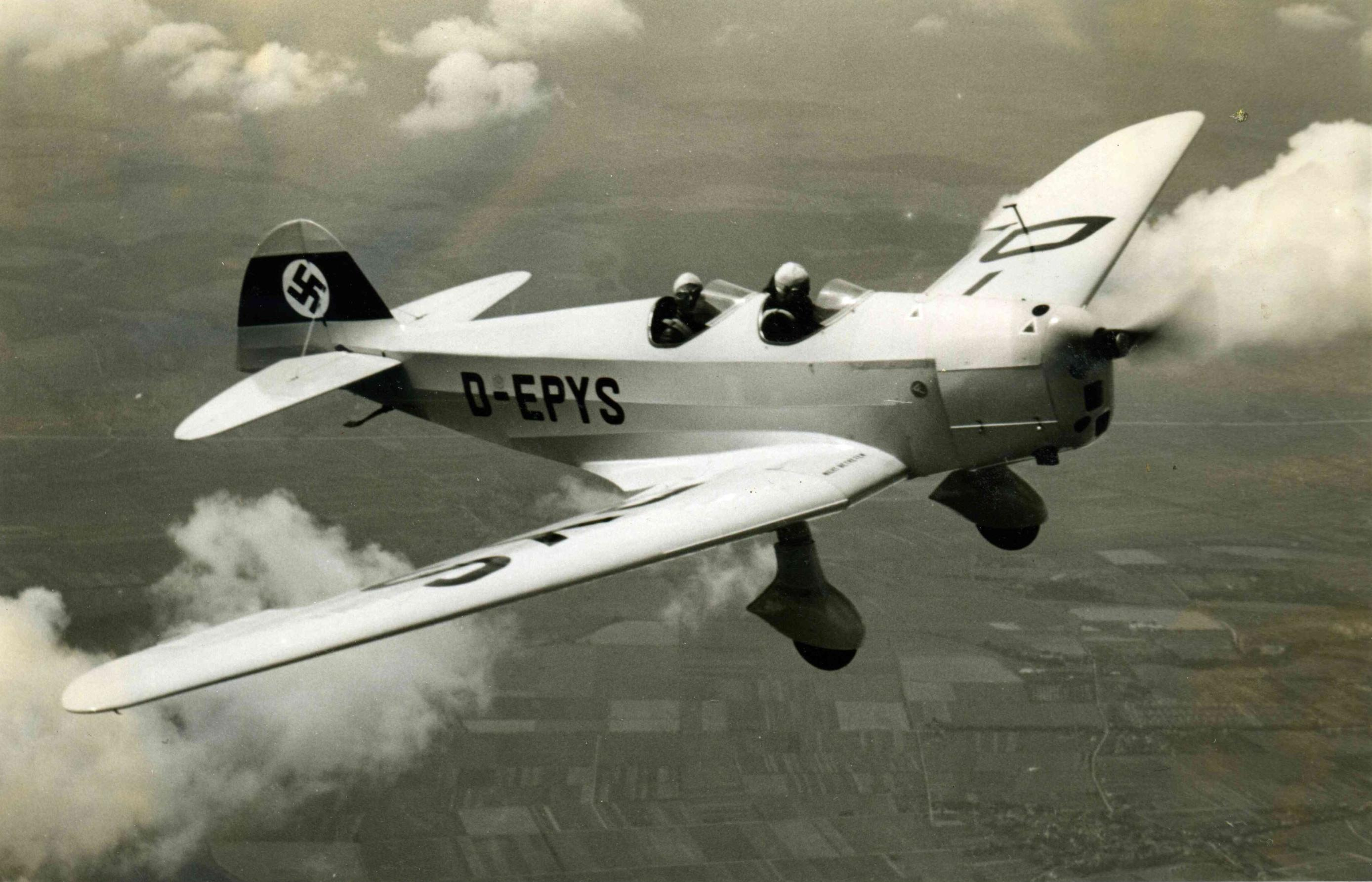
- Fieseler F5 R

General information
- Type: Sports plane
- National origin: Germany
- Manufacturer: Fieseler
- Number built: 29+

History
- First flight: 1933
- Retired: 1968
- Developed from: Fieseler F 4

The Fieseler Fi 5 (previously F5) was a single-engined two-seat sportplane of the 1930s. It was produced by the German aircraft manufacturer Fieseler Flugzeugbau, which was started by the World War I fighter ace and German aerobatic star, Gerhard Fieseler.

== Design and development ==
Gerhard worked at the company full-time after winning the first World Aeronautics Competition (Championship) of 1934 in his Fieseler F2 Tiger, having previously won the 1932 European Aerobatic Championship, and the F5 was among the company's earliest big sellers. The F5 was powered by the Hirth HM 60 engine. It competed with the Klemm Kl 25, but with the F5's shorter wings and different handling that experienced pilots preferred, it became quite popular.

The F 5 was a low-wing tandem two-seat monoplane which retained the fabric-covered steel-tube fuselage of the earlier Fieseler F 4 but introduced a new two-spar cantilever wing. It had a fixed conventional landing gear with a tail-skid and the tandem open-cockpit were fitted with dual-controls. Behind the rear seat was a large luggage locker, the top decking at the rear could be removed to carry a spare propeller or skis.

In 1935 one aircraft Saureland was modified as a single-seat aerobatic aircraft for Lise Fastenrath with the front cockpit covered over. Only one aircraft survived the Second World War, it was later fitted with an enclosed cabin but was written off in France in 1968.

== Variants ==
F 5
Production aircraft with a Hirth HM.60 engine.
F 5R
Aircraft fitted with an uprated Hirth HM.60R engine.

== Specifications (F.5R) ==
Data from Aircraft of the Third Reich, and The "Fieseler 5" Monoplane

General characteristics

- Crew: 2
- Length: 6.6 m (21 ft 8 in)
- Wingspan: 10 m (32 ft 10 in)
- Height: 2.3 m (7 ft 7 in)
- Wing area: 13.6 m^{2} (146 sq ft)
- Empty weight: 395 kg (871 lb)
- Max takeoff weight: 660 kg (1,455 lb)
- Powerplant: 1 × Hirth HM.60R inverted 4-cyl. air-cooled in-line piston engine, 60 kW (80 hp) for take-off

Performance

- Maximum speed: 200 km/h (120 mph, 110 kn) at sea level
- Cruise speed: 175 km/h (109 mph, 94 kn)
- Range: 1,000 km (620 mi, 540 nmi)
- Service ceiling: 4,200 m (13,800 ft)
- Rate of climb: 3.67 m/s (722 ft/min)
- Time to altitude: 1,000 m (3,300 ft) in 4.8 minutes

== See also ==
Related lists

- List of military aircraft of Germany
- List of aircraft of the World War II Luftwaffe
