= FMA I.Ae. 48 =

Argentine jet fighter project

General information
- Type: Fighter
- National origin: Argentina
- Manufacturer: Fábrica Militar de Aviones
- Designer: Reimar Horten
- Status: Cancelled 1960

The I.Ae. 48 was a prototype jet fighter of Argentine origin. It was to be developed after the I.Ae. 37 program was split with it becoming a subsonic trainer as the new, more powerful fighter, designated as the I.Ae. 48, with two podded engines under the wings and intended to reach Mach 2.2.(2700 km/h). However, both projects were canceled in 1960 as an economic measure, only a year before the I.Ae. 37 was to fly.

== History ==
Since the late 1940s, the major aviation industry was passing a golden age in which the availability of foreign exchange in government coffers, the profusion of German aeronautical engineers, unemployed Italian and French and British willingness to provide aeronautical engines and accessories generation allowed the Aeronautical and Mechanical Industries of the State (IAME) embark on the dream of becoming autonomous in the development and construction of high-performance aircraft and advanced technology. But the depletion of budget sources, the ambition of some designs, and distraction in initiatives outside the aerospace field conspired to dilute the fantasy that Argentina achieved aeronautical be a power comparable to the great nations. The coup of 1955 only served to finish a project that, by 1953, showed clear signs of stagnation due to lack of resources and, why not, by the appearance of some technical bottlenecks own work that sometimes bordered on border technology of the time.

== Overview ==
This model, designated IA-48, be equipped with two Rolls-Royce Avon RA3 thrust of 2,950 kg, two Rolls-Royce Nene 101, 2 267 kg or two nacelles containing Bristol Orpheus 2 200 kg under the wings, which in turn, would delta wing Pointed or Gothic was designed to reach Mach 2.2. The Navy was interested in the model for use in the new aircraft carrier Independence, reached in 1958, that is why underwent some changes, such as the orientation of the flow of engine exhaust.

== Specifications ==
- Type: Interceptor
- Engine: 2 RR Avon of 2950 kg, or 2 RR Nene 101 of 2267 kg, or 2 Bristol Orpheus Bor of 2200 kg thrust
- Max. Speed: Mach 2.2
- Landing Speed: 155 km / h
- 16 800 kg MTOW
- Wing Area: 50 m2
