= Horten H.XIII =

WWII German flying wing aircraft

H.XIII
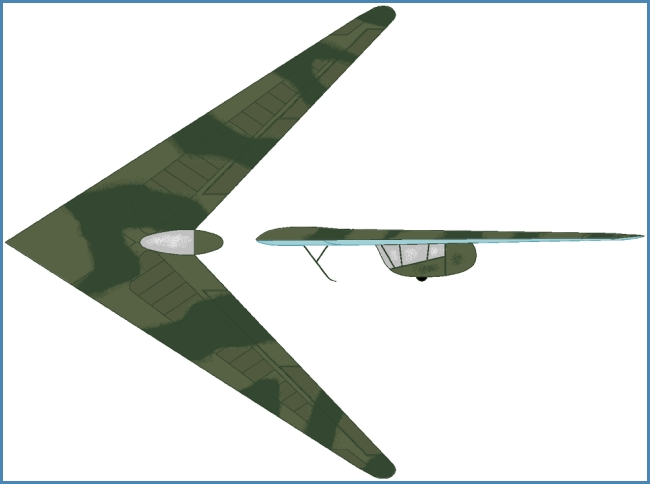

General information
- Type: experimental glider
- National origin: Germany
- Manufacturer: Horten
- Designer: Walter and Reimar Horten
- Number built: 1

History
- First flight: 27 November 1944

The Horten H.XIII was an experimental flying wing aircraft designed by the Horten brothers during World War II.

== Design ==
The H.XIIIa was an unpowered glider with wings swept backwards at 60°. It was a technology demonstrator to examine the low speed handling of highly swept wings, for the development of a jet fighter which was expected to exceed Mach 1, the H.XIIIb.

== Specifications (H.XIIIa) ==
Data from Nurflügel

General characteristics

- Crew: 1
- Length: 10 m (32 ft 10 in) nose to imaginary line between wing tips
- Wingspan: 12 m (39 ft 4 in)
- Wing area: 36 m^{2} (390 sq ft)
- Aspect ratio: 4.0
- Empty weight: 250 kg (551 lb)
- Max takeoff weight: 330 kg (728 lb)

Performance

- Stall speed: 44 km/h (27 mph, 24 kn)
- Never exceed speed: 180 km/h (110 mph, 97 kn)
- Landing speed: 44 km/h (27 mph; 24 kn)
- Maximum glide ratio: 16:1 at 80 km/h (50 mph; 43 kn) and 9.2 kg/m^{2} (1.9 lb/sq ft)
- Rate of sink: 1.1 m/s (220 ft/min) at 60 km/h (37 mph; 32 kn)
- Wing loading: 9.2 kg/m^{2} (1.9 lb/sq ft)
