= Shackleton-Murray SM.1 =

SM.1
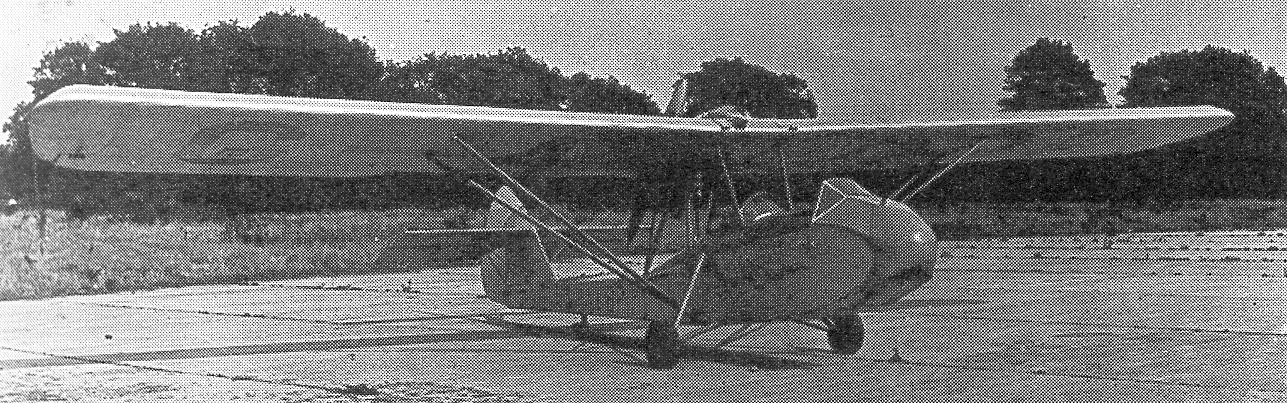

General information
- Type: Light aircraft
- National origin: United Kingdom
- Designer: William Shackleton
- Number built: 1

History
- First flight: 1933
- Retired: 1937

The Shackleton-Murray SM.1 was a single-engined two-seat light aircraft designed in Britain and flying in 1933. It was a pusher driven parasol winged monoplane. Only one was built.

== Development ==
William Shackleton designed the Beardmore Wee Bee that won the first prize at the Lympne light aircraft trials#1924. He then set up in partnership with a fellow Australian, Lee Murray who wanted a machine of his own and had been impressed by the Curtiss-Wright Junior, a parasol-wing pusher driven two seater that had sold well in the United States. The influence of the Junior was clearly seen in the Shackleton-Murray SM.1, though in detail they were quite different.

The SM.1 was a wooden-framed, fabric-covered parasol monoplane. The wing had constant chord and only slightly rounded tips, the latter built out of papier-mâché. It carried a pair of narrow ailerons, inboard of which were wing-folding boxes, hinged sections of the trailing edge which could be lifted up to allow the wings to fold backwards against the fuselage. All four spars were identical and the pairs of ailerons and wingboxes were interchangeable to keep the costs of spares low. Pairs of V-shaped lift struts ran from the lower fuselage longerons to the two wing spars. There were pairs of tall centre section struts to the wing from the top longerons in front of and behind the rear cockpit, keeping the wing high enough to provide easy access. The rear pair also supported the front of the Hirth HM 60 four cylinder inverted in-line engine mounted on the underside of the wing, assisted by another pair at the rear of it. The Hirth drove a two-bladed pusher propeller.

With the engine high amidships, the pusher arrangement allowed the fuselage to sit close to the ground, making cockpit access easy. The fuselage was deep in the nose, and the front cockpit well forward. The rear cockpit was under the forward part of the wing; dual controls were fitted. Behind the rear cockpit the fuselage became less deep, providing clearance for the propeller tips and further aft was quite slender. A conventional fin and balanced rudder carried the rectangular tailplane, with its split elevators, about halfway up and strut-braced from below. The undercarriage was a split-axle design, with the main legs attached to the upper longerons just behind the rear cockpit and with pairs of bracing struts from the lower longerons. Though the wheels were small in diameter, they used low-pressure tyres. Unusually, the rear wheel was not at the tail but halfway between the trailing edges of wing and rudder.

The SM.1 was built by Airspeed, starting at their York works and following them down to Portsmouth Airport in 1933. The date of its first flight, made from Sherburn-in-Elmet Airfield is not recorded, but in September 1933 it went from London Air Park, Hanworth to Martlesham Heath Airfield for certification. Plans to put the SM.1 into production, using a Pobjoy R radial were announced in May 1933, but came to nothing. The sole SM.1, registered G-ACBP in January 1935 was later sold to Lord Apsley of the Bristol and Wessex Aero Club, but came down in the sea off the Isle of Wight after the engine failed on 22 July 1936. Lord Apsley was picked up by a passing yacht.

== Specifications ==
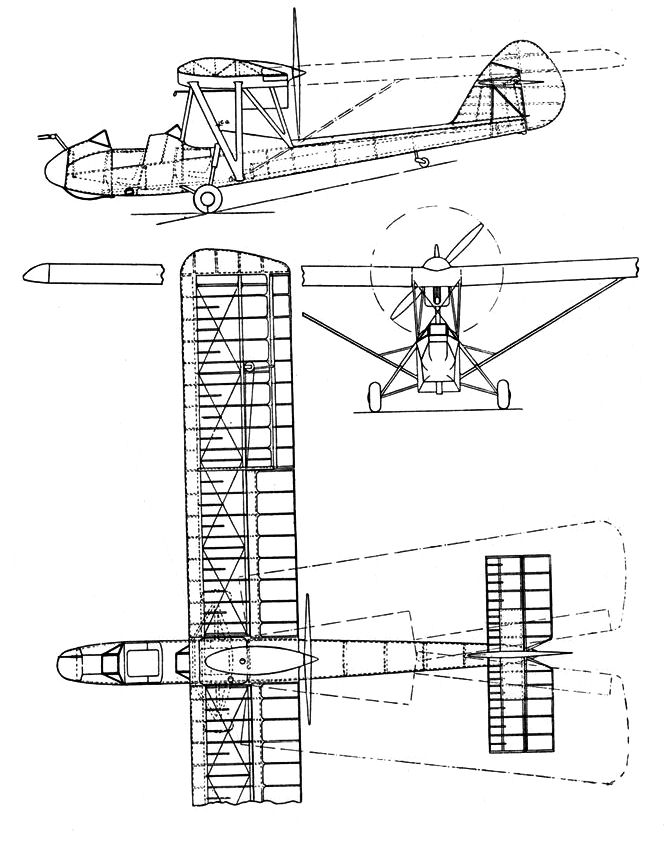
Shackleton-Murray SM.1 3-view drawing from L'Aerophile-Salon 1934

Data from Ord-Hume 2000, pp. 462

General characteristics

- Crew: 2
- Length: 25 ft 7 in (7.80 m)
- Wingspan: 40 ft 0 in (12.19 m)
- Height: 7 ft 6 in (2.29 m)
- Wing area: 210 sq ft (20 m^{2})
- Empty weight: 840 lb (381 kg)
- Gross weight: 1,450 lb (658 kg)
- Powerplant: 1 × Hirth HM 60 four cylinder inverted in-line air-cooled

Performance

- Maximum speed: 90.5 mph (145.6 km/h, 78.6 kn)
- Cruise speed: 75 mph (121 km/h, 65 kn)
- Stall speed: 35 mph (56 km/h, 30 kn)
- Range: 250 mi (400 km, 220 nmi)
