= Nike PUL 9 =

Argentine experimental tailless aircraft

PUL 9

General information
- Type: Experimental tailless aircraft
- National origin: Argentina
- Manufacturer: Nike Aeronautica srl, Bologna
- Designer: Reimar Horten & Siegfried Panek
- Number built: 1

History
- First flight: 22 July 1990

The Nike PUL 9 is an Argentine experimental tailless aircraft powered by a Rotax 447 engine.

== Design and development ==
The PUL 9 had its origins in Argentina, the home of the German flying wing pioneer Reimar Horten since 1948. In late 1989 a collaboration between Horten and Siegfried Panek produced a design for a single seat, single pusher engine tailless aircraft. The name was an acronym of Panek UltraLight, with 9 the span in metres. Construction began near Frankfurt, Germany in January 1990 but was transferred to the Italian company Nike Aeronautica in the spring. The PUL 9 first flew on 22 June 1990.

It had 30° of sweep on the leading edges of its thick (thickness/chord ratio 20%), symmetric aerofoil, wings, built using carbon fibre and Kevlar with glassfibre for the spars. The wingtips were rounded, with washout. Elevons controlled both pitch and roll; there was no vertical stabilizing surface, rudder or separate tailplane.

Like some of Horten's tailless gliders, the I.Ae. 34 Clen Antú for example, the PUL 9 had a well defined, though short, fuselage or pod. This was a deep steel tube structure starting about mid-chord and extending well behind the trailing edge, with a single seat open cockpit at the front and a 42 hp (31 kW) Rotax 447 two cylinder two-stroke engine in pusher mode behind. The main wheels of the PUL 9's fixed tricycle undercarriage were also mounted on the steel frame, with the nosewheel attached near the leading edge. The undercarriage used rubber cord shock absorbers and drum brakes.

The PUL 9 is reported to have flown several times and handled well. By the end of 1991 attention had turned to a two-seat version, the Nike PUL 10.

== Specifications ==
Data from Jane's All the World's Aircraft 1991/2

General characteristics

- Crew: 1
- Length: 3.90 m (12 ft 10 in)
- Wingspan: 9.00 m (29 ft 6 in)
- Height: 1.60 m (5 ft 3 in)
- Wing area: 11.60 m^{2} (124.9 sq ft) approximate
- Empty weight: 150 kg (331 lb)
- Max takeoff weight: 300 kg (661 lb)
- Powerplant: 1 × Rotax 447UL 2-cylinder inline two-stroke, 31.3 kW (42.0 hp)
- Propellers: 3-bladed Arplast 148GAM adjustable pitch pusher, 1.48 m (4 ft 10 in) diameter

Performance

- Maximum speed: 225 km/h (140 mph, 121 kn) at sea level
- Cruise speed: 140 km/h (87 mph, 76 kn) economical, at sea level
- Stall speed: 55 km/h (34 mph, 30 kn)
- Rate of climb: 5.08 m/s (1,000 ft/min)

== See also ==
- BAaer BA-5 Guri
