= Charles M. Olmsted =

American aeronautical engineer

Charles Morgan Olmsted
- Born: January 19, 1881
- Died: 1948 (aged 66–67)
- Occupation: Aeronautical Engineer
- Spouse: Elizabeth A. McNiel (June 18, 1881)
- Children: 5 children
- Parent(s): Clara Amanda Morgan; John Bartow Olmsted

Charles Morgan Olmsted (January 19, 1881 – 1948) was an American aeronautical engineer.

== Aeronautics ==
Charles M. Olmsted held a Ph.D. in astrophysics and became an aeronautical engineer in the early 20th century. When he was 14, he designed and built a glider, one of the first models ever tested in the United States. In the fall of 1909 Olmsted led an attempt by the Pitts company to begin the production of airplanes in contrast to the steam tractors they were producing. He began in 1909 by designing and constructing a minimum-induced-loss propeller and then in 1910 a prototype plane of solid construction, as opposed to the ultra-light construction of the day, a plane which would have inherent stability and an efficient stream-lined profile. Olmsted minimum-induced-loss propellers set many records in climb rates, speed and weight carried aloft in flights of the Curtiss built flying boats, Edith and America, in 1914, and various military craft during 1917 and 1918. Because they increased efficient by 20% over the standard design, Olmsted minimum-induced-loss propellers were also used on the first leg of the historic Transatlantic flights of the NC planes in 1919. Charles Olmsted can be ranked as America's first scientifically trained aeronautical engineer in the modern sense of the term: one who applies mathematical methodology to the scientific study of air flow, propeller design and to the analysis of the strengths and weights of materials to design and construct aircraft.

Olmsted was not the first in the US to design, build and fly a glider, which he did at the age of 13 in 1894, but he was probably the first child to do so. In 1894 Charles Olmsted designed and built a glider in which during the following year he made the longest glider flight ever achieved in America till that time. Most noteworthy, beginning in 1910, Olmsted was the first to design and construct a streamlined monocoque aircraft and Olmsted was certainly the first to develop the minimum-induced-loss propeller.

In 1894 and 1895, Charles Olmsted attended Harvard University. After Harvard, Olmsted attended Göttingen University and Wilhelm Institute Bonn from 1902 to 1906, obtaining his PhD from Bonn. In 1908, Olmsted began experiments and theoretical investigations into minimum-induced loss propellers. Only five years after the first successful powered flight of the Wrights, Charles Olmsted developed the initial equations describing the blade shape and pitch to achieve the maximum attainable efficiency from an airplane propeller. In the first-time-ever wind-tunnel testing of full-size propellers in 1909, Olmsted perfected his design and his theory of propellers.

Such increases in efficiency were crucial for the successful operation of the early Transatlantic Flying Boats, like the America (1914) and the four Curtiss NCs (1919), all of which utilized Olmsted propellers. After final testing on July 12, 1914, in preparation for the planned Transatlantic flight, Glenn Curtiss publicly announced the Olmsted propellers, “the finest and most efficient I have ever seen.” Two years after developing the propeller equations in 1908, Olmsted formed a syndicate with the Buffalo Pitts Company to develop for mass-production a prototype plane.

Founded in 1851, the Buffalo Pitts Company had grown to be the world's largest producer of threshers and steam-traction engines. Located on the Erie Canal in the port area of Buffalo, the “Queen City of the Lakes”, the company had shipped farm equipment to all corners of the globe (pl. 3). In the fall of 1909 Charles Olmsted had set up an aerodynamic laboratory on the third floor of the Buffalo Pitts building, where he would test his already-developed mathematical techniques for producing a “minimum-induced-loss” propeller. The main draw for Olmsted was the vast electrical dynamos of Niagara Falls, supplying power to the Pitts Company, which would enable him to use controllable large-horsepower electric motors to produce high-velocity wind to test propellers and plane models accurately in a wind-tunnel. In the spring of 1910 Olmsted led an attempt by the Pitts company to begin the production of airplanes in contrast to the steam tractors they were producing. He began by designing and constructing a prototype plane of solid construction, as opposed to the ultra-light construction of the day, a plane which would have inherent stability and an efficient stream-lined profile. The plane was as light and graceful as the Pitts company's steam engines were heavy and cumbersome. Unfortunately, the Buffalo Pitts Company was too late in its attempt to diversify and fell a victim to the depression of 1912–14.

Nearly completed by 1912, the Olmsted monocoque Bird would be one of the first true solidly-built “airplanes” of scientifically engineered design and structure ever to be constructed. Its wings were made of thin-gauge chrome-vanadium steel sheets, aluminum, and basswood laminations, all firmly riveted together. Its fuselage, like that of the Spruce Goose despite its name, was molded of monocoque laminated birch. Careful testing of the weights and strengths of the materials and parts utilized in its construction played a paramount role in its design, as did testing in the wind tunnel to minimize drag and maximize lift. Planes contemporary with the Olmsted-Buffalo-Pitts craft were fabricated from wooden ribs and often bamboo framing covered with lacquered fabric of essentially ultralight design. Even the Curtiss flying boats still had rubberized fabric wings to lift their thin wooden boat hulls. Since the pilot of the Olmsted plane would be surrounded by crushable laminated wood structures, these structures would absorb much of the blow in case of a crash. By the additional incorporation of “inherent stability” in flight as well as “around the stall” and “special landing gear” for nose-first landing, Olmsted wished to make “aeroplaning as safe and feasible as automobiling”.

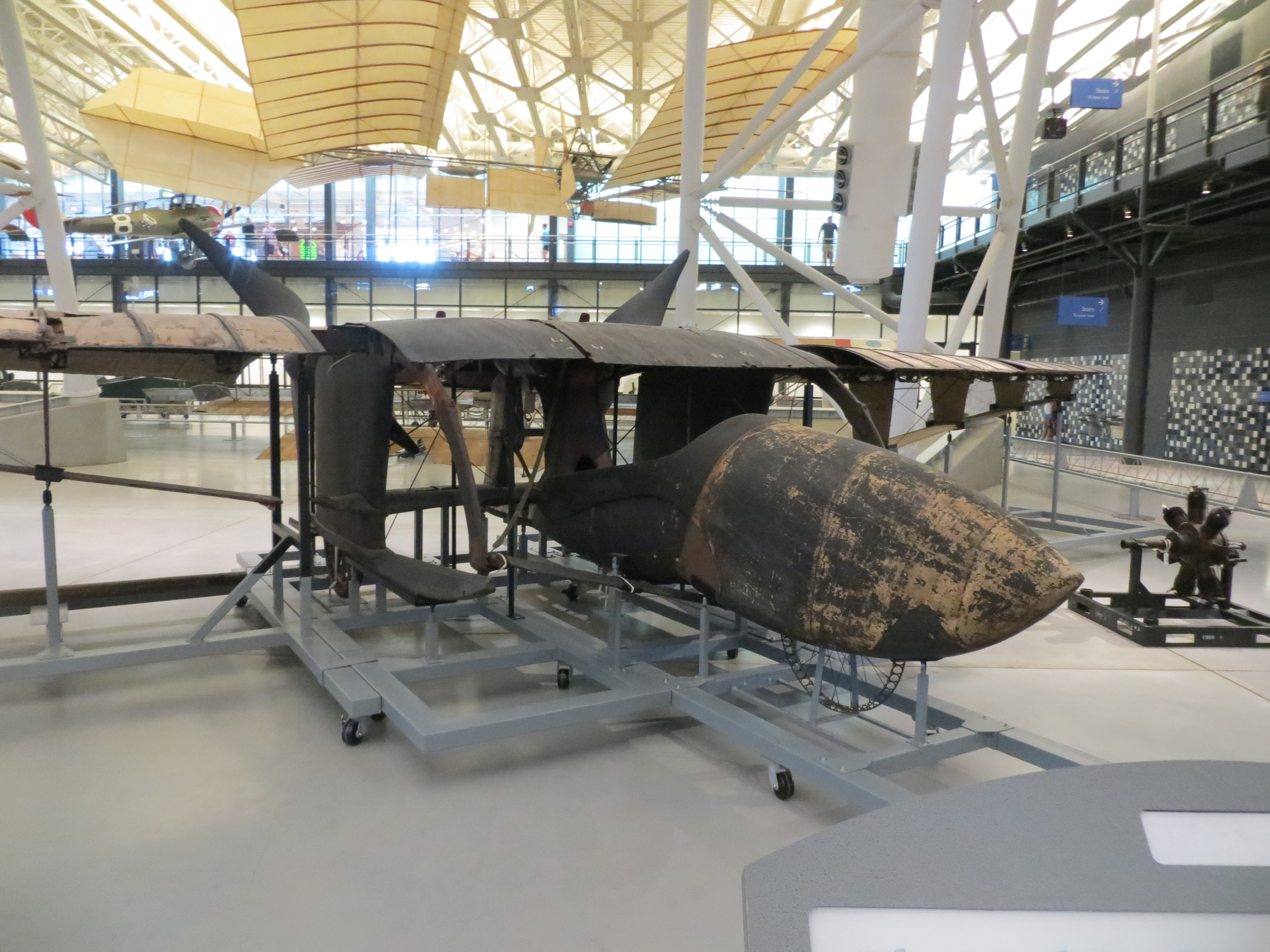
The remains of Olmsted's monocoque Pusher Aircraft on display at the Steven F. Udvar-Hazy Center

The prototype plane which Charles Olmsted designed in 1910 for the Buffalo-Pitts-Olmsted Syndicate has raked-back infinitely-variable-camber high-aspect-ratio wings, identical in shape to those of the 1935 DC-3. It also has retractable nose-first landing gear, an elevated high-aspect-ratio T-shaped tail section, and a gyroscopically stable air-cooled Gnome engine rotating in the direction of travel. The two counter-rotating maximally-efficient pusher propellers were mounted closely together at the apex of the wings and the covered surfaces of the wheel mount to counter swirl. There are special struts above and behind them to further render the remaining swirl directly into lift and thrust. Propeller swirl was hindered on the up-stroke but free on the down stroke to increase lift at take-off.

A major pioneering innovation on the plane is that every item was carefully stress-analyzed to a standard strength redundancy and minimum weight. All wooden parts were of hollow skin-stressed construction. Blueprints and patterns were made for every part, so that the Buffalo Pitts Company could go into immediate assembly-line production of the successful prototype sometime late in 1912. Many of the features of the Buffalo-Pitts-Olmsted plane are incorporated in the carbon-fiber 2008 Pipistrel Virus, winner of the 2007 and 2008 NASA award. The Virus also utilizes a streamlined fuselage suspended beneath the wing and an elevated T-shaped tail section. The Virus's propeller is also of Olmsted-patent type. The overall similarity of the two craft, separated by nearly 100 years in time, is quite striking (pls. 18–19). Today the plane is visible for all to see in the Smithsonian's Udvar Hazy center, but not a trace survives of the Buffalo Pitts Company. The entire complex occupying the blocks between Virginia and Carolina Streets on both sides of Fourth Street has been leveled and turned into a school playing field. Perhaps in memory of the Spaulding football which would have absorbed the front-wheel landing shock of the touchdown of the Olmsted Bird if she had been given the chance to fly, the goal post of a football field now marks the spot where the Bird lost her wings.

The Olmsted-Buffalo-Pitts 1912 Monocoque Bird with its wings made of thin-gauge chrome-vanadium steel sheet, aluminum sheet, and basswood lamination, and its fuselage molded of monocoque laminated birch and chrome-vanadium steel sheet was one of the first true “airplanes” of scientifically engineered design and structure ever to be manufactured. The plane's original development was stopped when it was 90% completed due to the bankruptcy of the Buffalo Pitts Company in the summer of 1912. Charles Olmsted then formed the CMO Physical Laboratory and continued to manufacture and sell the ultra-efficient propellers on his own for another seven years.

Indeed, flying boats with Olmsted propellers broke the world weight-carrying record twice in 1914, a MacDonnell hydroplane with an Olmsted propeller set the Navy climb record in 1917, and a Le Pere fighter clocked in its fastest flight ever with an Olmsted propeller in 1918. Olmsted propellers also enabled the NC boats to fly with 1500 pounds more weight and they also cut the take-off distance in half. Charles Olmsted was also the first to design a super-transport WIGE (wing-in-ground effect) vehicle in the spring of 1942. Out of this effort ultimately developed Howard Hughes huge flying boat, the Spruce Goose, as notes from the meeting with John Towers demonstrate ((Olmsted 2020: 226–230.

Olmsted only flew four times under powered flight in his entire life.

== See also ==
- Curtiss NC-4
- Horten H.V, a flying wing design from Germany that essentially used Olmsted-pattern pusher propellers
- John Cyril Porte
