= Klemm Kl 35 =

Aircraft

Kl 35
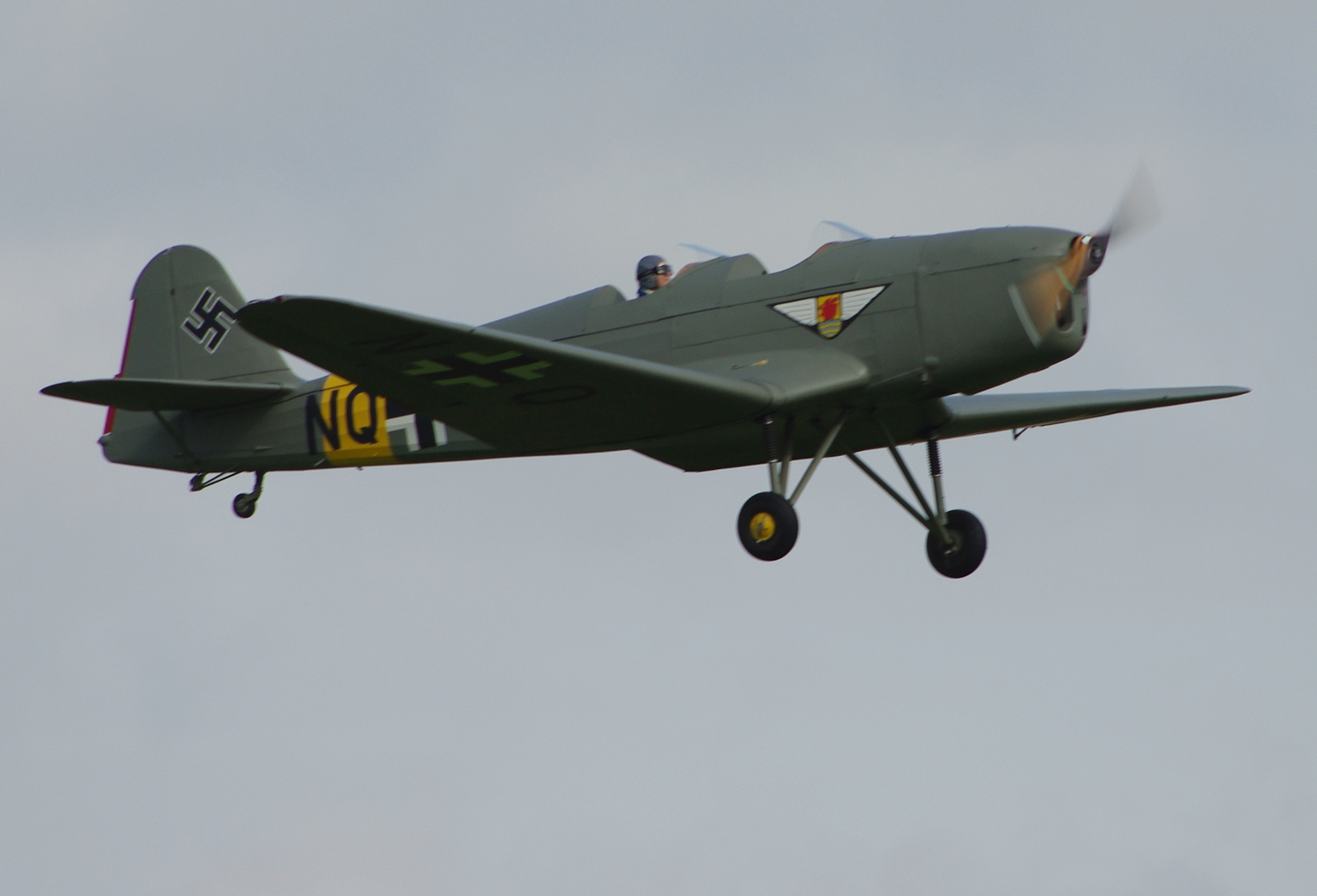
- Klemm Kl 35D

General information
- Type: Two-seat sports and training aircraft
- Manufacturer: Klemm Leightflugzeugbau Gmbh
- Designer: Friedrich Fecher
- Status: out of service
- Primary users: Luftwaffe Czechoslovak Air Force; Royal Hungarian Air Force; Royal Romanian Air Force
- Number built: c. 2,000

History
- Manufactured: 1937–1944
- Introduction date: 1935
- First flight: 1935

The Klemm Kl 35 is a German sporting and training aeroplane developed as a successor to the Kl 25. A product of Klemm Leichtflugzeugbau Gmbh, it shared the same single-engine, cantilever low-wing configuration as the earlier machine, the major difference being the introduction of an inverted gull wing.

Probably Klemm's most important type, the fully aerobatic aeroplane was shown for the first time publicly in October 1935 at the international Air Show in Milan and soon found many private buyers. Powered initially by an 80 hp (60 kW) Hirth HM60R inline, it had fixed undercarriage, mixed wood and fabric covering, and the choice of open or closed cockpit. Powered by the Hirth 60R, it became the Kl 35A (with floats, Kl 35AW), while with the 105 hp (78 kW) Hirth, it was the Kl 35A (with floats, Kl 35AW).

An improved Kl 35D, designed as a Luftwaffe trainer, with 105 hp (78 kW) Hirth HM 504A-2 engine and the option of ski or float landing gear, appeared in 1938. It was the most numerous, with over three thousand built.

A number of air forces purchased copies, including the Romanian, Hungarian, and Slovak. The Swedish Air Force bought several, designated Sk 15, for training use (at least five of those were seaplanes) and in 1941 began licence production, building about 74 more, with some remaining in service until 1951. The Lithuanian air force flew three.

== Development ==
The Kl 35 was designed in 1934 under the auspices of the Reichsluftfahrtministerium (RLM). Dipl. Ing. Friedrich Fecher had overall responsibility for the construction. The so-called Gemischtbauweise construction was used: steel for fuselage, wood for wings and tail units and only small quantities of light alloy for linings were used. This became a preferred building method with the RLM around this time, because from considerations of strategic material availability.

=== Production ===
Klemm suffered a setback in 1935 when the prototype Kl 35 crashed during testing at Rechlin. The results of further trial must have been satisfactory, because in July 1936, 23 aircraft were ordered for delivery between July and September 1937, with production planned to increase to 3 per month. Klemm was at the time manufacturing the Fw 44 under licence from Focke-Wulf.

By this time the RLM was already looking for a sub-contractor to build the Kl 35A under licence, choosing Fieseler which was already undertaking licence production of the He 72 and Fw 58 alongside Storchs at its Kasseler plant.

Further orders, to a total of 1,386, followed and new variants came on line, beginning with the Kl 35B with a new engine.

Manufacture at Fieseler ceased in November 1939, after 365 aircraft, when the RLM transferred licence production to Zlin in occupied Czechoslovakia.

Production ended in May 1943 with total production for the Luftwaffe having reached 1,302. The balance of production was for private and export customers, though since these would have to number nearly 700 to reach the oft-quoted total of around 2,000 this may be exaggerated.

== Operational history ==
During the late 1930s and throughout World War II, the Kl 35 was widely employed in the Luftwaffe. Its main role was training student pilots—particularly in aerobatics, navigation, and transition to faster military aircraft. Unlike frontline fighters, the Kl 35 was not designed for combat, but its use was essential for preparing thousands of Luftwaffe pilots.

Variants like the Kl 35B and Kl 35D featured refinements in engine type and equipment. Around 2,000 units were built during its production run (1935–1943).

The Kl35 was the most manufactured model of Klemm Leichtflugzeugbau Gmbh. Some were manufactured for export to countries including Hungaria, Lithuania, and Sweden.

It is currently believed that at most 20 Kl35s have survived until the present day.

== Variants ==
Kl 35a
The first prototype, powered by a 60-kW (80-hp) Hirth HM60R piston engine.
Kl 35b
Second prototype.
Kl 35A
Initial production version, powered by a 60-kW (80-hp) Hirth HM60R piston engine
Kl 35B
Version, powered by an 80-kW (105-hp) Hirth HM 504 A2 piston engine. Covered single-strut landing gear
Kl 35BW
Floatplane version.
KL 35C
Version with wooden fuselage soon renamed as Kl 106, intended for production under licence in the United States, just one built
Kl 35D
Improved version with triangle landing gear.
Kl 35E
Version powered by an improved 80-kW (105-hp) Hirth HM 500 engine
Sk 15
Swedish military designation for the Kl 35D.

== Operators ==
Czechoslovakia

- Czechoslovak Air Force (Postwar)

Germany

- Luftwaffe

Hungary

- Royal Hungarian Air Force

Lithuania

- Lithuanian Riflemen's Union's Aviation

Slovakia

- Slovak Insurgent Air Force
- Slovak Air Force (1939–1945)

Romania

- Royal Romanian Air Force

Spain

- Spanish Air Force

Sweden

- Swedish Air Force

== Surviving aircraft ==
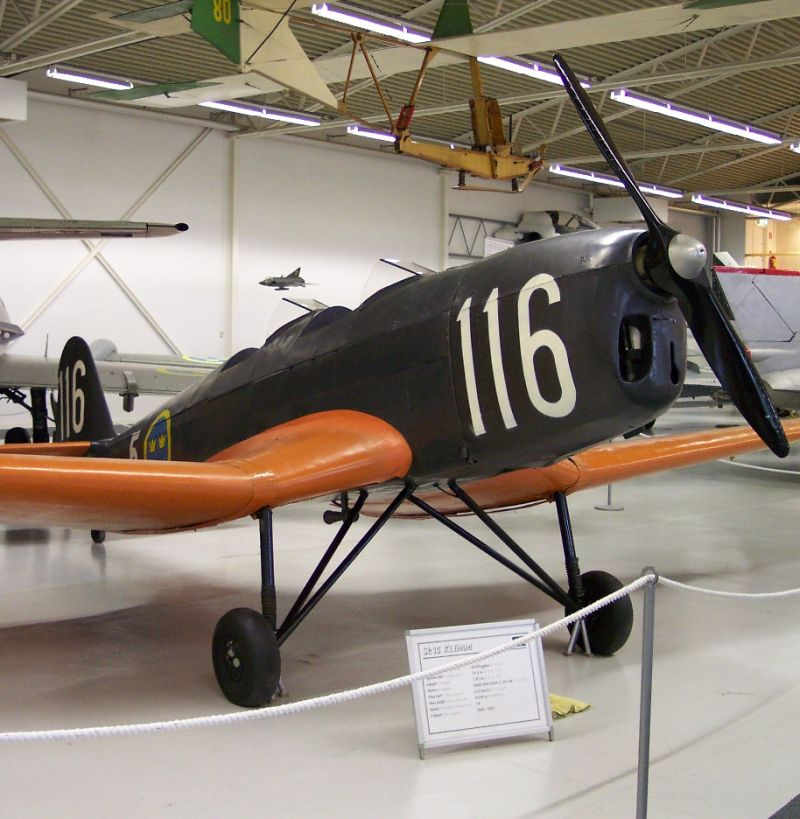
Klemm Kl35

No Luftwaffe machine is known to survive, but a number of ex-Flygvapnet machines have been preserved.

- Klemm Kl 35B, Fv5081, Werk-Nr. 1596, 5-116, Swedish Airforce museum, Linköping S
- Klemm Kl 35D D-EFTY, Werk-Nr. 1642, the only German survivor, Fliegendes Museum, Großenhain D
- Klemm Kl 35D, SE-AKN, Werk-Nr. 1783, closed cabin, Edeby S
- Klemm Kl 35D, Fv5010, Werk-Nr. 1806, Malmö Museer, Malmö S
- Klemm Kl 35D, D-EFUB, Werk-Nr. 1810, Winzeln-Schramberg D
- Klemm Kl 35D D-EMHN, Werk-Nr. 1842, Bad Wörrishofen D
- Klemm Kl 35D F-AZTK, Werk-Nr. 1854, ex D-EHKO F
- Klemm Kl 35D, Fv5010, Werk-Nr. 1899, 5-155, Svedinos Museum, Halmstad S
- Klemm Kl 35D, D-EDOD, Werk-Nr. 1917, ex D-ELLY, flown by Liesel Bach, Deutsches Technikmuseum Berlin D
- Klemm Kl 35D, D-EQXD, Werk-Nr. 1979, ex G-KLEM was owned and operated by Peter Holloway at Old Warden, Bedfordshire, UK. Sold to Germany, Paderborn
- Klemm Kl 35D D-EBUX, Werk-Nr. 1981, 5-182, Fv 5052, ex SE-BHT major overhaul since 2011, Eutingen D, 1st flight after overhaul 2019-08-01
- Klemm Kl 35D SE-BGA, Werk-Nr. 1983, 5-184, flew again after nearly 50 years on 19 December 2009. It is based at Siegerland-Airport EDGS, .

== Specifications (Klemm Kl 35D) ==
Data from The Concise Guide to Axis Aircraft of World War II

General characteristics

- Crew: 2
- Length: 7.5 m (24 ft 7 in)
- Wingspan: 10.4 m (34 ft 1 in)
- Height: 2.05 m (6 ft 9 in)
- Wing area: 15.2 m^{2} (164 sq ft)
- Empty weight: 460 kg (1,014 lb)
- Max takeoff weight: 750 kg (1,653 lb)
- Powerplant: 1 × Hirth HM 60R 4-cylinder inverted air-cooled in-line piston engine, 60 kW (80 hp)
- Propellers: 2-bladed fixed-pitch propeller

Performance

- Maximum speed: 212 km/h (132 mph, 114 kn)
- Cruise speed: 190 km/h (120 mph, 100 kn)
- Range: 665 km (413 mi, 359 nmi)
- Service ceiling: 4,350 m (14,270 ft)
- Rate of climb: 3.0 m/s (590 ft/min)

== See also ==
Aircraft of comparable role, configuration, and era

- Miles Magister

Related lists

- List of military aircraft of Germany

== Bibliography ==
- Bohill-Smith, Steve. "On the Wings of a Klemm: Flying America's Unique Klemm Kl 35". Air Enthusiast, No. 55, Autumn 1994, pp. 28–31. ISSN 0143-5450
- Mondey, David. The Concise Guide to Axis Aircraft of World War II. London: Chancellor, 1996. ISBN 1-85152-966-7.
- Smith, J. R. and Kay, Antony L. German Aircraft of the Second World War. London: Putnam, 1990. ISBN 0-85177-836-4.
- Sinnhuber, Karl (2012). Salzburg To Stalingrad. UK: Milton Keynes. ISBN 9781471702228.
