= Horten H.V =

German motor-glider

H.V
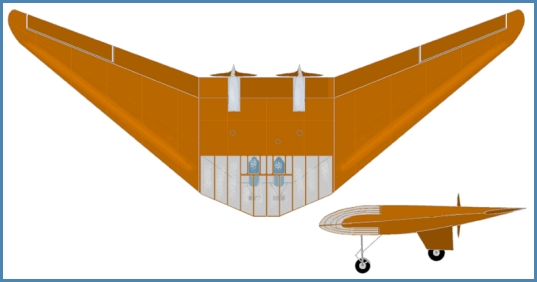
- The H.V (later H.Va)

General information
- Type: Tail-less delta motorglider
- National origin: Germany
- Designer: Reimar Horten and Walter Horten
- Number built: 2

History
- First flight: June 1937

The Horten H.V was a delta-winged, tail-less, twin-engined motor-glider designed and built in the late 1930s and early 1940s by Walter and Reimar Horten in Germany. The H.V aircraft were used for various experimental duties, including: innovative structure, performance, stability and control of flying wing aircraft. The first H.V was the first aircraft to be built using an all composite material structure.

== Design and development ==
Reimar Horten developed a relationship with Dynamit AG, at Troisdorf, the major producer of phenolic resins in Germany. There he learnt of the various products available and how to use them in aircraft structures.

After having built two Hols der Teufel wings from 'Dynal', a plastic composite material made from paper reinforced phenolic resin and incorporated other plastic materials in the Horten H.II, the Horten brothers took the next step and designed an aircraft to be built completely of Dynal, (with the exception of undercarriage, engine mounts, high strength fittings and cockpit framing). Structural components were moulded and assembled using glue and bolts through holes drilled in the components without bushings. Leading edge D-boxes were built up using sheets of Dynal glued either side of a 'Tronal' (wall board) core, cold pressed in moulds. The first H.V (later re-dubbed H.Va after two further aircraft were built) was powered by two 59 kW (79 hp) Hirth HM 60R engines driving specially carved pusher propellers directly, without gearboxes or extension shafts. Pilot and passenger lay semi-prone in the nose under extensive plastic sheet glazing.

The undercarriage of the H.V was fixed, with a nosewheel just aft of the cockpit and two mainwheels under the engines, the fairings of which formed the only fin area to impart directional stability.

One more aircraft was built, using conventional wooden materials: the H.Vb, which had two upright seats under individual canopies either side of the centre-section. After being abandoned to the elements the H.Vb was converted to the sole H.Vc with a single upright seat under a sideways opening canopy.

The H.Vc was allocated the RLM ID number 8-252 (later re-used for the 1938-39 Junkers trimotor replacement for the Ju 52/3m) and by inference Horten Ho 252 though this was little used in practice.

== Operational history ==
The H.V(a) had a very brief career crashing on take-off for its first flight, after the nose rose alarmingly without enough control power to lower it. Walter Horten, the pilot, shut one engine down and closed the throttle on the other with difficulty, but was unable to prevent the aircraft sinking to the ground in a flat attitude at a high rate of descent.

The H.Vb enjoyed a successful career but was eventually abandoned to the elements when the brothers had pressing wartime commitments. This aircraft was rebuilt as the H.Vc, flying in 1942. Eventually the H.Vc succumbed to a crash in 1943 after the pilot attempted a take-off with full landing flap selected, hit a hangar and dropped to the ground.

== Variants ==
H.V
(H.Va) The World's first all composite aircraft, with 14 m (46 ft) span wings.
H.Vb
the second aircraft built with upright seats under individual canopies, with 16 m (52 ft) span wings.

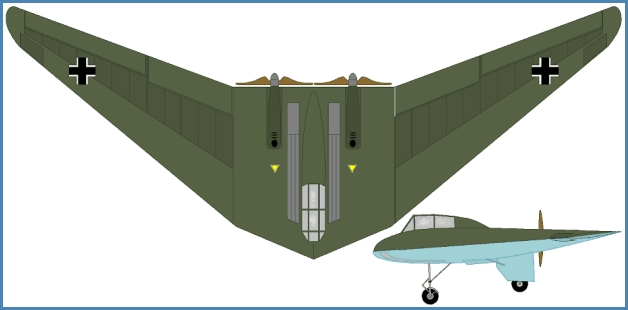
the H.Vc, with Olmsted-style "minimum induced-loss" propellers

H.Vc
After falling into disrepair the H.Vb was rebuilt with a single seat under a sideways-opening canopy on the centreline.

== Successor ==
The Horten H.VII, developed during the Second World War, was based on the Horten H.V.

== Specifications (H.Vb) ==
Data from Horten Nurflügels

General characteristics

- Crew: 2
- Wingspan: 16 m (52 ft 6 in)
- Wing area: 38 m^{2} (410 sq ft)
- Aspect ratio: 6.75
- Empty weight: 1,360 kg (2,998 lb)
- Max takeoff weight: 1,600 kg (3,527 lb)
- Fuel capacity: 80 kg (180 lb)

Performance

- Maximum speed: 260 km/h (160 mph, 140 kn)
- Cruise speed: 230 km/h (140 mph, 120 kn)
- Stall speed: 82 km/h (51 mph, 44 kn)
- Landing speed: 70 km/h (43 mph; 38 kn)
- Never exceed speed: 350 km/h (220 mph, 190 kn)
- Wing loading: 38 kg/m^{2} (7.8 lb/sq ft)
- Power/mass: 13.5 kg/kW (22.2 lb/hp)
