= FMA I.Ae. 37 =

Argentine jet fighter prototype

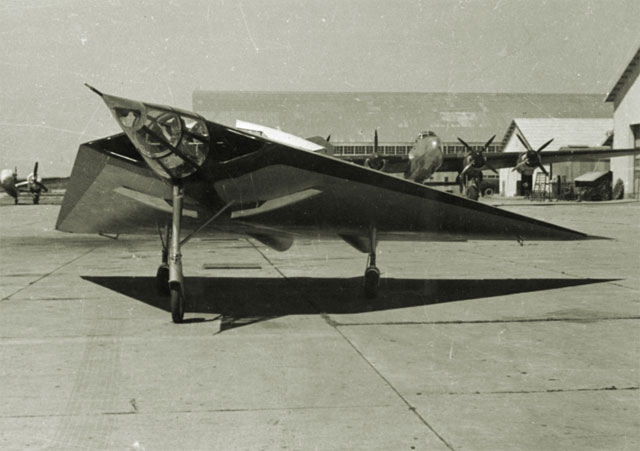

General information
- Type: Interceptor
- National origin: Argentina
- Manufacturer: Fábrica Militar de Aviones
- Designer: Reimar Horten
- Status: Cancelled 1960

The FMA I.Ae. 37 was a prototype jet fighter developed in Argentina during the 1950s. It never flew and was cancelled in 1960.

== Development ==
Reimar Horten began work on the I.Ae. 37 around 1952, after his earlier flying wing projects were cancelled in 1951. This was a single-engined jet fighter that used a Delta wing flying wing structure with lateral engine inlets on each side of the nose. Wind tunnel tests began in 1953 as did testing of scale models at speeds up to 200 km/h (120 mph). A full scale glider was built and made its first flight on 1 October 1954. Most unusually the pilot lay prone and looked out through the clear nose. Flight performance was deemed excellent and manufacture of a prototype powered by a Rolls-Royce Derwent V began in 1955. This engine was selected as it was readily available, but lacked the thrust desired for the fighter. The glider was modified with a normal cockpit in 1956. Shortly afterwards the program was split with the current aircraft becoming a subsonic trainer and a new, more powerful fighter, designated as the I.Ae. 48, with two podded engines under the wings and intended to reach Mach 2.2 (2,700 km/h). However, both projects were cancelled in 1960 as an economy measure, only a year before the I.Ae. 37 was to fly.

== Specifications (I.Ae. 37) ==
Data from Rivas 2008, p. 170

General characteristics

- Crew: 1
- Length: 11.78 m (38 ft 8 in)
- Wingspan: 10 m (32 ft 10 in)
- Height: 4.92 m (16 ft 2 in)
- Wing area: 48 m^{2} (520 sq ft)
- Empty weight: 3,300 kg (7,275 lb)
- Gross weight: 4,800 kg (10,582 lb)
- Powerplant: 1 × Rolls-Royce Derwent V turbojet, 16.02 kN (3,600 lbf) thrust

Performance

- Maximum speed: 800 km/h (500 mph, 430 kn)
- Range: 2,000 km (600 mi, 520 nmi)
- Service ceiling: 11,000 m (36,089 ft)

== See also ==
- I.Ae. 48
