= I.Ae. 41 Urubú =

1950s Argentinian flying wing glider

IAe.41 Urubú
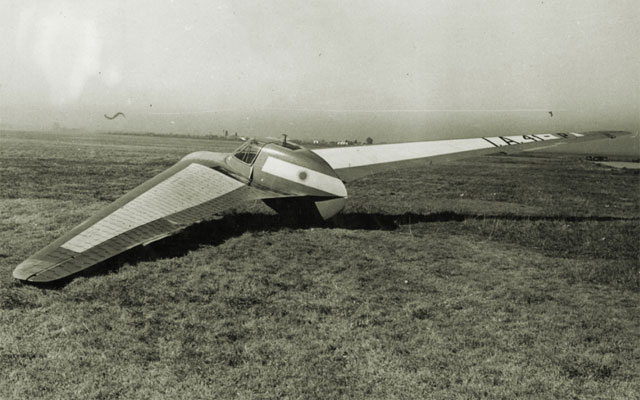

General information
- Type: Civil tailless flying wing sailplane
- National origin: Argentina
- Manufacturer: Instituto Aerotécnico
- Designer: Reimar Horten
- Number built: 5

History
- First flight: 1953

The I.Ae.41 Urubú was a two-seat flying wing tailless glider, built in Argentina by the Fábrica Militar de Aviones (FMA) in the 1950s.

== History ==
In 1951 some airclubs requested from the Department of Aeronautics (Secretaría de Aeronáutica) that a side-by-side two-seater sports glider should be built. Its development was assigned to the Instituto Aerotécnico (I.Ae.), in Cordoba. The design team was led by Professor Reimar Horten, who was a pioneer in the design of tailless flying wing planes. His project H.XVc was submitted to the Department of Aeronautics, and was assigned the denomination I.Ae.41 "Urubú" (meaning "owl" in mapudungun). Production at the FMA was limited to five planes, and the first flight was in 1953.

In September 1956, after a proposal from the "Dirección de Fomento de la Aviación Civil" (Civil Aviation Directorate), a crossing of the Andes Mountain Range ("Cordillera de los Andes") with sailplanes was attempted. The gliders chosen were the I.Ae.41 Urubú, towed by a Morane-Saulnier, and a Slingsby Sky glider, towed by a Stearman. Pilots Hans Scheidhauer (Urubú) and Claudio Dori (Sky) flew from San Carlos de Bariloche (Argentina) to Paraje Ensenada (Chile). The flight lasted three hours, crossing over: Cerro Otto, Cerro Catedral, the Tristeza branch of Nahuel Huapi lake, Puerto Blest, Cerro Tornador, Laguna Fría, Lanín Volcano, Cerro El Puntiagudo and Cerro Osorno.

== Description ==
The I.Ae 41 was a wooden aircraft, similar in general to the preceding I.Ae. 34 Clen Antú but with a spacious twin-seat side-by-side cockpit. Its design incorporated lessons learnt from its predecessor and it had improved aerodynamics, showing better handling in turbulent conditions. Its tandem landing gear had more efficient shock absorbers.

== Surviving aircraft ==
A surviving aircraft has been restored, and is displayed at the Argentine Air Force’s Museo Nacional de Aeronáutica de Argentina, located at Morón Airport.

== Specifications (I.Ae. 41) ==
Data from

General characteristics

- Crew: two
- Length: 4.40 m (14 ft 5 in)
- Wingspan: 18 m (59 ft 1 in)
- Height: 1.9 m (6 ft 3 in)
- Wing area: 27 m^{2} (290 sq ft)
- Empty weight: 250 kg (551 lb)
- Max takeoff weight: 410 kg (904 lb)
- Leading edge sweepback: 26.6
- Aerofoil thickness: 18%

Performance

- Never exceed speed: 200 km/h (120 mph, 110 kn)
- Towing speed: 51 km/h (32 mph)
- Landing speed: 51 km/h (32 mph)
- Maximum glide ratio: 24 at 81 km/h (50 mph) and 15.2 kg/m^{2} (3.1 lb/sq ft)
- Rate of sink: 0.85 m/s (167 ft/min) at 65 km/h (40 mph) and 15.2 kg/m^{2} (3.1 lb/sq ft)
- Wing loading: 15.2 kg/m^{2} (3.1 lb/sq ft)

== See also ==
- Altinger TA-15 Lenticular
- I.Ae. 25 Mañque
- I.Ae. 34 Clen Antú

Related lists

- List of flying wing aircraft
