= Horten brothers =

German aircraft pilots (1910s–1990s)

The Horten brothers: Walter (left) and Reimar (right)

Walter Horten (born 13 November 1913 in Bonn; died 9 December 1998 in Baden-Baden, Germany) and Reimar Horten (born 12 March 1915 in Bonn; died 14 March 1994 in Villa General Belgrano, Argentina), sometimes credited as the Horten Brothers, were German aircraft pilots. Walter was a fighter pilot on the Western Front, flying a Bf 109 for Jagdgeschwader 26 in the first six months of World War II, and eventually became the unit's technical officer. Reimar was also trained as a Messerschmitt Bf 109 pilot but, later in August 1940, he was transferred to the glider pilot school in Braunschweig. He earned his PhD in mathematics from the University of Göttingen, having resumed his studies in 1946 with help from Ludwig Prandtl. The Hortens designed the world's first jet-powered flying wing, the Horten Ho 229.

== Biography ==
=== Early lives ===
Between the World Wars, the Treaty of Versailles limited the construction of German military airplanes. In response, German military flying became semi-clandestine, taking the form of civil "clubs" where students trained on gliders under the supervision of World War I veterans. As teenagers, the Horten brothers were involved in these flying clubs.

This back-to-the-basics education, and an admiration of German avant-aircraft designer Alexander Lippisch, led the Hortens away from the dominant design trends of the 1920s and 1930s, and toward experimenting with alternative airframes — building models and then filling their parents' house with full-sized wooden sailplanes. The first Horten glider flew in 1933, by which time both brothers were members of the Hitler Youth.

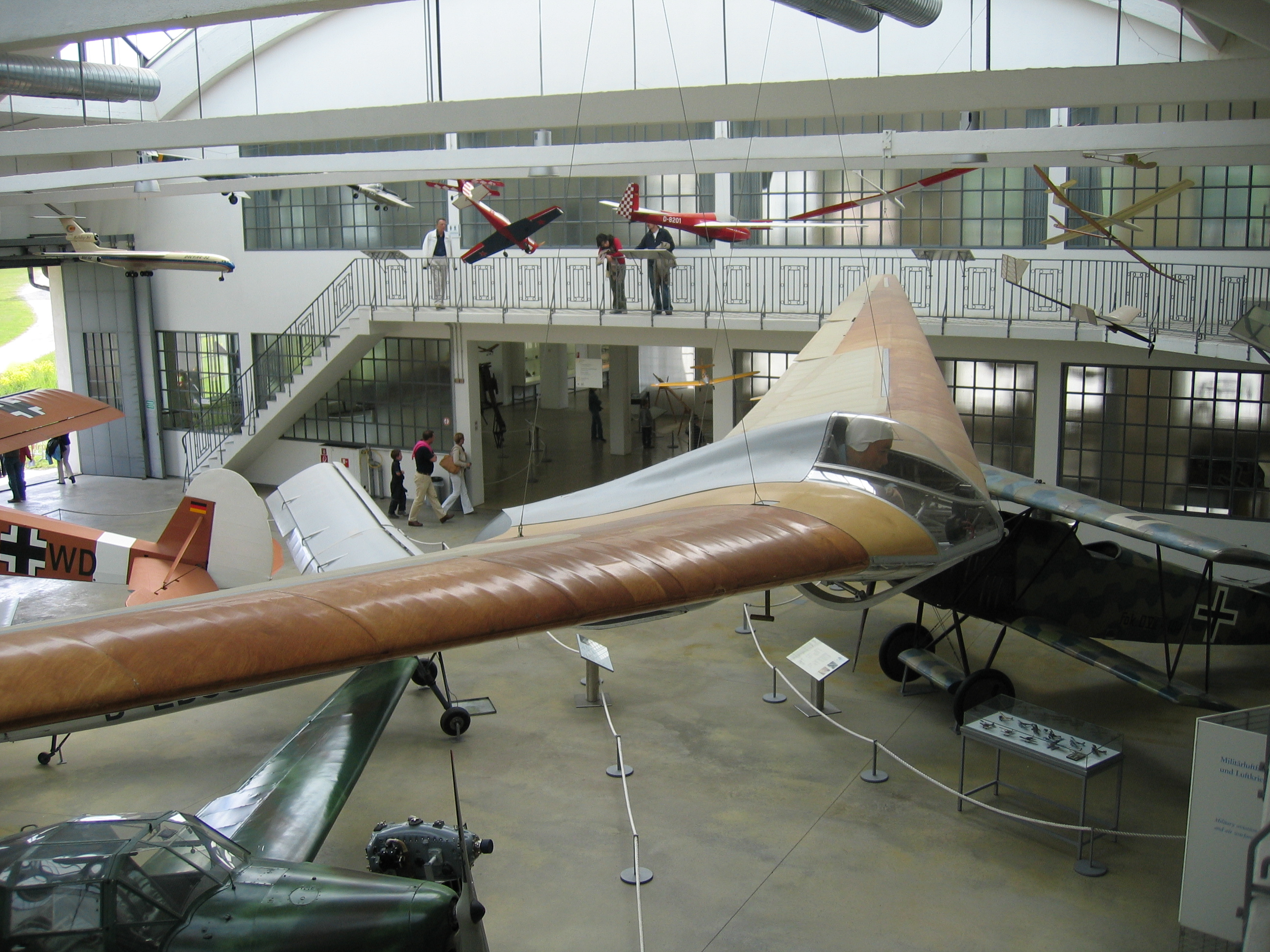
Horten Ho IV flying wing sailplane recumbent glider at the Deutsches Museum

The Hortens' glider designs were extremely simple and aerodynamic, generally consisting of a huge, tailless albatross-wing with a tiny cocoon of a fuselage, in which the pilot lay prone. The great advantage of the Horten designs was the relatively low parasitic drag of their airframes.

=== During World War II ===
By 1939, with Adolf Hitler in power and the Treaty of Versailles no longer in effect, Walter and Reimar had entered the Luftwaffe as pilots. A third brother, Wolfram, was killed flying a bomber over Dunkirk. They were also called upon as design consultants, though Germany's aeronautical community tended to regard the Hortens not as part of the cultural elite. However, both were members of the NSDAP.

Walter participated in the Battle of Britain, secretly flying as the wingman for Adolf Galland, and shot down seven British aircraft.

In 1937, the Hortens began using motorized airplanes, with the debut of the twin-engined pusher-prop airplane H.VII (an earlier glider had a mule engine). The Luftwaffe, however, did not use many of the Hortens' designs until 1942, but gave enthusiastic support to a twin-turbojet-powered fighter/bomber design, designated under Luftwaffe protocols as the Horten H.IX. For their completion of the three Ho 229 prototypes (V1, V2, V3), the Horten brothers were awarded 500,000 Reichsmark (approximately US$2–3 million in 2021 terms).

The Horten Ho 229, the first jet-powered flying wing

Securing the allocation of turbojets was difficult in wartime Germany, as other projects carried higher priority due to their rank in the overall war effort. Although the turbojet-equipped Ho 229 V2 nearly reached a then-astonishing 800 km/h (500 mph) in trials, the production of the third prototype V3 was given over to the coachbuilder Gothaer Waggonfabrik, subsequently called Gotha Go 229. The Go 229 was captured by the U.S. Army at the end of World War 2, and the nearly complete V3 third prototype aircraft was shipped to the US to be studied. It is presently stored at the Smithsonian Institution in Washington, D.C., US.

The Ho 229 had potential, but it was simply developed too late to see service. The Horten brothers also worked on the Horten H.XVIII, an intercontinental bomber that was part of the Amerikabomber project, and a prototype for a smaller version was ordered for the 1000 x 1000 x 1000 contest, for a bomber capable of flying at 1,000 km/h (620 mph) with 1,000 kg (2,200 lb) bombs with a 1,000 km (620 mi) range.

Among other advanced Horten designs of the 1940s was the supersonic delta-wing H.X, designed as a hybrid turbojet/rocket fighter with a top speed of Mach 1.4, but it was only tested in glider form as the Horten H.XIII.

=== Post World War II ===
As the war ended, Reimar Horten emigrated to Argentina after failed negotiations with the United Kingdom and China, where he continued designing and building gliders, including one experimental supersonic delta-wing aircraft and the four-engined flying wing FMA I.Ae 38 Naranjero, intended to carry oranges from producers to Buenos Aires. Walter remained in Germany after the war and became an officer in the post-war German Air Force. Reimar died on his ranch in Argentina in 1994, while Walter died in Germany in 1998.

In the late 1940s, the personnel of Project Sign, the U.S. Air Force's flying saucer investigation, seriously considered the possibility that UFOs might have been secret aircraft manufactured by the USSR based on the Hortens' designs.

== Aircraft ==
=== Germany ===
- Horten H.I
- Horten H.II Habicht
- Horten H.III
- Horten H.IV
- Horten H.V
- Horten H.VI
- Horten H.VII
- Horten H.XIII
- Horten H.XVIII
- Horten Ho 229

==== Post-war ====
- Horten Ho 33
- PUL-10

=== Argentina ===
- Horten H.Ib
- I.Ae. 34 Clen Antú
- I.Ae. 37
- I.Ae. 38 Naranjero
- I.Ae. 41 Urubú
- Nike PUL 9

== See also ==
- Amerikabomber
- Northrop YB-35
- Northrop YB-49
- Fábrica Militar de Aviones
- Alsomitra
- German inventors and discoverers

== Bibliography ==
- Russell E. Lee, Only the Wing: Reimar Horten's Epic Quest to Stabilize and Control the All-Wing Aircraft (Washington, Smithsonian Institution Scholarly Press, 2012).
