= Göppingen Gö 9 =

German research aircraft

Gö 9
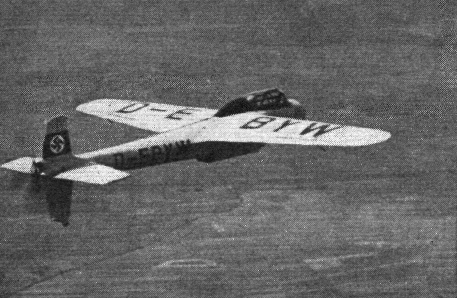
- Göppingen Gö-9 motor glider, flying c.1941

General information
- Type: Experimental aircraft
- National origin: Nazi Germany
- Manufacturer: Schempp-Hirth
- Designer: Ulrich Hütter
- Number built: 1

History
- First flight: 1941, by Dornier Test Pilot Henry H. W. Quenzler
- Developed from: Dornier Do 17

The Göppingen Gö 9 was a German experimental aircraft built to investigate the practicalities of powering a plane using a pusher propeller located far from the engine and turned by a long driveshaft.

== Design and development ==
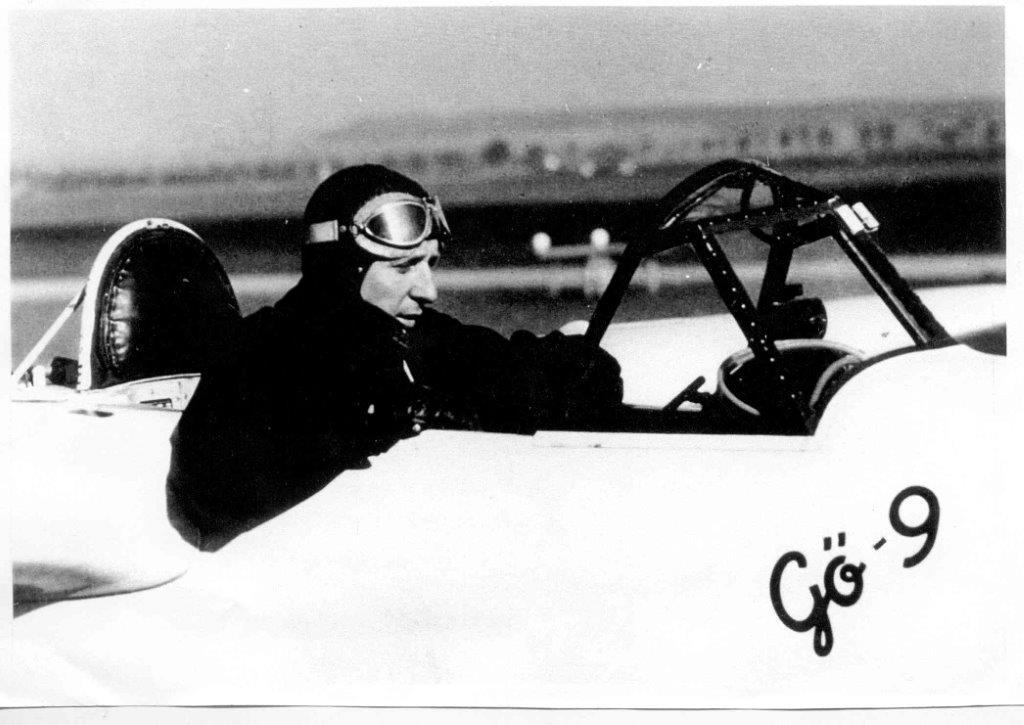
Dornier Test Pilot Henry H. W. Quenzler in cockpit of Gö 9 experimental aircraft

In 1937, Claudius Dornier observed that adding extra engines and propellers to an aircraft in an attempt to increase speed would also attract a penalty of greater drag, especially when placing two or more engines within nacelles mounted on the wings. He reasoned that this penalty could be minimized by mounting a second propeller at the rear of an aircraft. To prevent tail-heaviness, however, the engine would need to be mounted far ahead of it. Dornier patented this idea and commissioned a test plane to evaluate it.

The aircraft was designed by Dr Ulrich Hütter as a 40% sized, scaled-down version of the Dornier Do 17's fuselage and wing panels without the twin-engine nacelles, and built by Schempp-Hirth. The airframe was entirely of wood and used a retractable tricycle landing gear – one of the earliest non-Heinkel-built German airframe designs to use such an arrangement. Power was supplied by a Hirth HM 60 inverted, air-cooled inline four-cylinder engine mounted within the fuselage near the wings. Other than the engine installation, the only other unusual feature of the aircraft was its all-new, full four-surface cruciform tail, which included a large ventral fin/rudder unit of equal area to the dorsal surface. This fin incorporated a small supplementary tailwheel protruding from the ventral fin's lower tip that assisted in keeping the rear-mounted, four-blade propeller away from tailstrike damage against the ground during take-off and landing. The Gö 9 carried the civil registration D-EBYW.

== Operational history ==
Initially towed aloft, flight tests began in June 1941, but later flights operated under its own power. The design validated Dornier's ideas, and he went ahead with his original plan to build a high-performance aircraft with propellers at the front and rear, producing the Dornier Do 335. The test pilot was Henry H. W. Quenzler. The eventual fate of the Gö 9 is not known.

== Specifications (Gö 9) ==
Data from Die Deutsche Luftruestung 1933-1945 Vol.1 - AEG-Dornier

General characteristics

- Crew: 1
- Length: 6.80 m (22 ft 4 in)
- Wingspan: 7.20 m (23 ft 7 in)
- Gross weight: 720 kg (1,587 lb)
- Powerplant: 1 × Hirth HM 60 4-cyl. inverted air-cooled in-line piston engine, 60 kW (80 hp)
- Propellers: 4-bladed pusher propeller turned via an extension shaft

Performance

- Maximum speed: 220 km/h (140 mph, 120 kn)

== See also ==
Aircraft of comparable role, configuration, and era

- Paulhan-Tatin Aéro-Torpille No.1
- Douglas XB-42

Related lists

- List of military aircraft of Germany
- List of World War II military aircraft of Germany
