= Horten H.VII =

Flying wing prototype

H.VII
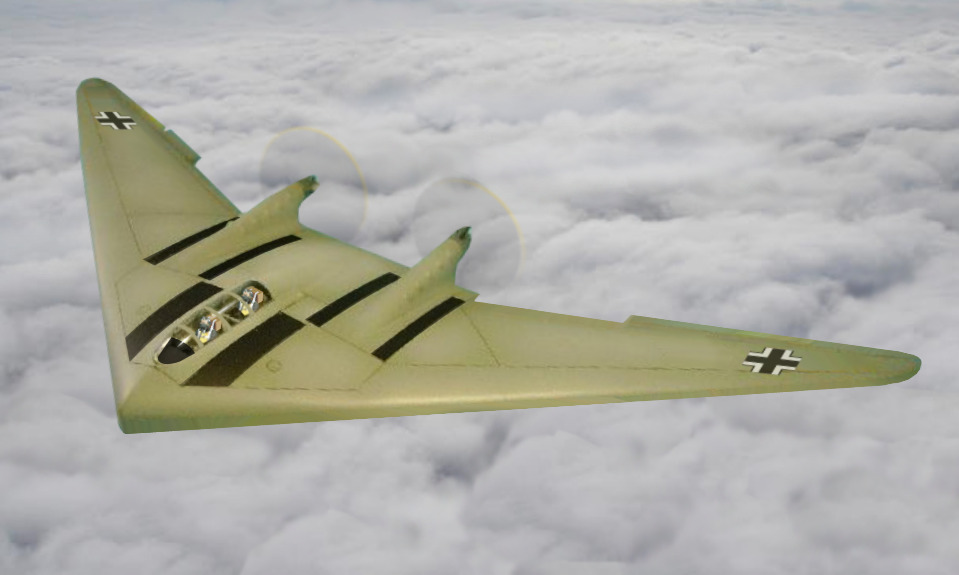
- Artist impression of the Horten H.VII in flight

General information
- Type: Flying-wing fighter-trainer
- National origin: Germany
- Manufacturer: Peschke
- Designer: Walter and Reimar Horten
- Number built: 2

History
- First flight: May 1944
- Developed from: Horten H.V

The Horten H.VII was a flying wing fighter-trainer aircraft designed by the Horten brothers in Nazi Germany during World War II.

== Development ==
The H.VII was originally allocated the Reichsluftfahrtministerium (RLM) designation 8-226, but was later given the new RLM designation 8-254, so it was known by inference as Horten Ho 226 or Horten Ho 254, though these designations were little used in practice.

In 1942 the H.VII design began as a test-bed for the Schmitt-Argus pulse-jet engine but this project was cancelled in 1943 and the aircraft's role became that of a trainer. It was based on the Horten H.V but with more powerful Argus As 10C engines. Walter Horten piloted its first flight in May 1944 and took part in many hours of a series of test flights, partly intended to quell concerns about the tailless aircraft's controllability in the case of an asymmetric power loss.

Two prototypes were built and the H.VII V-3, nearing completion by the time that the allied advance reached the Peschke factory in Minden, would have been the first of twenty production aircraft. Two H.VIIs were destroyed in the advance and one taken to the USSR.

== Specifications (H.VII) ==
Data from Nurflügel except where noted

General characteristics

- Crew: 2
- Wingspan: 16 m (52 ft 6 in) ; 40° leading edge sweep
- Wing area: 44 m^{2} (470 sq ft)
- Aspect ratio: 5.8
- Empty weight: 1,550 kg (3,417 lb)
- Gross weight: 2,000 kg (4,409 lb)
- Powerplant: 2 × Argus As 10C air-cooled, inverted V8 piston engines in angled pusher configuration, 176 kW (236 hp) each
- Propellers: 2-bladed Argus, driven via long, cowled drive-shafts above the trailing edge of the inner wing.

Performance

- Maximum speed: 350 km/h (220 mph, 190 kn)
- Cruise speed: 300 km/h (190 mph, 160 kn)
- Never exceed speed: 550 km/h (340 mph, 300 kn)
- Service ceiling: 6,500 m (21,300 ft)
- Rate of climb: 7 m/s (1,400 ft/min) from sea level
- Wing loading: 45.5 kg/m^{2} (9.3 lb/sq ft)
- Power/mass: 5.7 kg/kW (9.4 lb/hp)
- Take-off: at 110 km/h (68 mph; 59 kn) after 250 m (820 ft) roll.
