= Horten H.I =

German single-seat glider, 1933

H.I
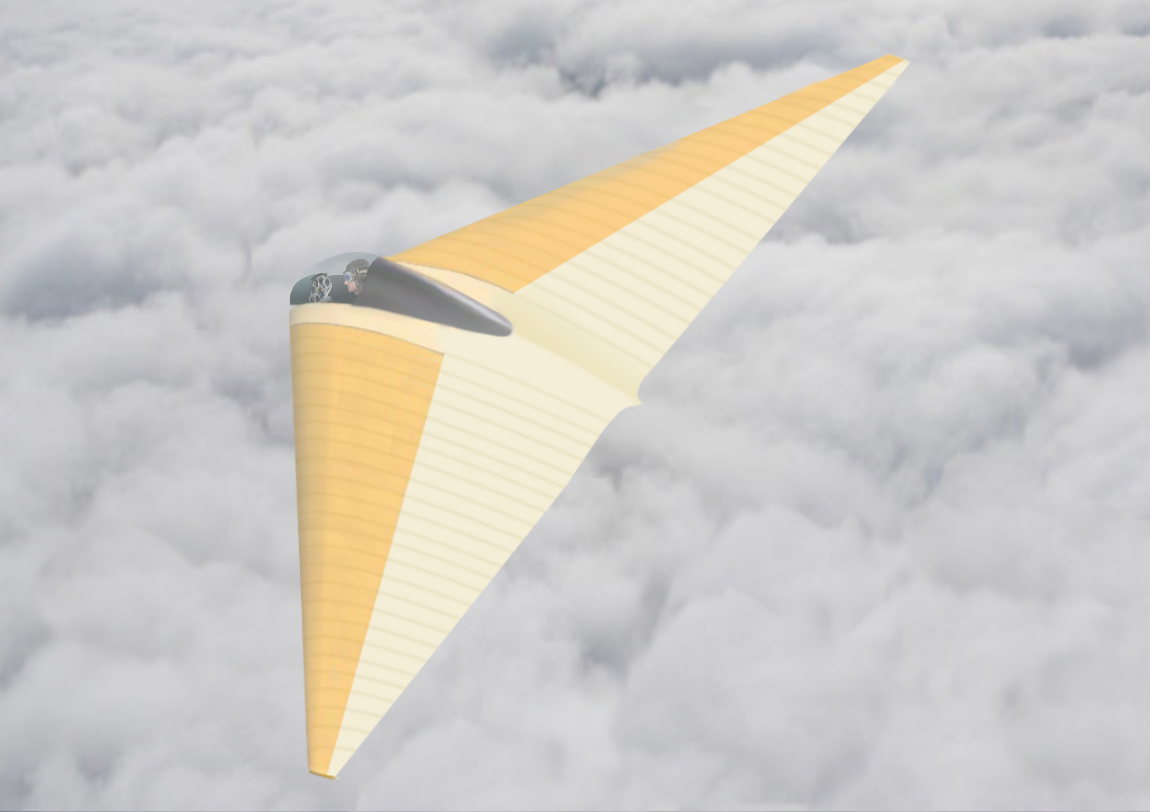
- Artist impression of the H1 in flight

General information
- Type: Tail-less research glider
- National origin: Germany
- Manufacturer: Horten brothers
- Designer: Walter & Reimar Horten
- Number built: 2

History
- First flight: July 1933

The Horten H.I was a German flying wing research glider built by Walter and Reimar Horten in 1933.

== Design and development ==
The first aircraft of the Horten brothers was created with considerable effort in 1933 in their parents' apartment in Bonn. Reimar Horten designed and built the machine and learned to fly it. Flight testing started in July 1933 at the Bonn-Hangelar airport, and Walter Horten, only 20 years old, made the first cautious hops in the aircraft on the end of a bungee cord, resulting in glides of 150 to 300 feet at altitudes of six feet or less. After a few small changes, the H.I had overcome the biggest teething troubles, and the brothers took it to the Wasserkuppe competition the following year.

=== H.Ib ===
In 1951, members of the Club de Planeadores Otto Ballod and Reimar Horten built a new version, called the H.Ib, using a more modern section and the control accomplished by elevons located on the outer wings, omitting the inner elevators/flaps. For use as rudders, Schempp-Hirth flaps were installed on the wingtips, also serving as a landing aid when both flaps were activated together.

== Operational history ==
=== Horten H.I ===
The H.I was first flown in July 1933 at Bonn-Hangelar airport, initially using bungee cord, then auto-tow, leading to winch launches to 300 m (1,000 ft). Aero-tow launches were then carried out using a BFW M.23 as tug, to 1,100 m (3,500 ft).

Problems with control and stability were discovered, due to the operation of the elevators and ailerons and centre of gravity too far aft. With the flying qualities of the aircraft satisfactory, Walter Horten set off under aero-tow to the 1934 Rhön meeting at the Wasserkuppe, towed by a Klemm L.25. Delayed en route by bad weather, Walter arrived late and also damaged the aircraft on landing. Although unable to participate in the flying contest the H.I was awarded a "Construction" prize of DM600.

Walter remained at the Wasserkuppe with the H.I until the Gliding school Director ordered him to leave and take the H.I with him. A telephone request to Alexander Lippisch for a tug to fly the H.I back to Bonn was unsuccessful, so Walter flew the H.I for one more time, landed successfully, broke up the aircraft and burned the remains.

=== Horten H.Ib ===
The H.Ib had good handling characteristics and was flown far into the 1970s by the Club de Planeadores Otto Ballod. At the turn of the millennium, the members of the club restored their long-serving flying-wing to "better than new" condition.

The H.Ib was the only Horten flying wing still airworthy, until the first flight in Germany in 2016 of the newly built H.IV.

== Variants ==
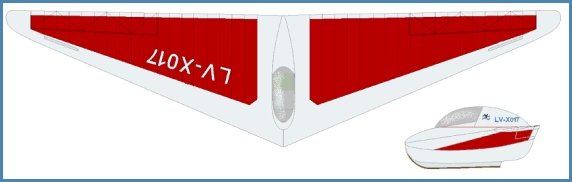
H.Ib

H.I
Single-seat tail-less research glider first flown in 1933; one built.
H.Ib
A post-WWII low-performance derivative designed and built in Argentina and flown, for the first time, on 2 May 1954.

== Specifications (H.I) ==
Data from Nurflügel : die Geschichte der Horten-Flugzeuge 1933-1960, The Horten brothers and their all-wing aircraft

General characteristics

- Crew: 1
- Wingspan: 12.4 m (40 ft 8 in)
- Height: 0.9 m (2 ft 11 in)
- Wing area: 21 m^{2} (230 sq ft)
- Aspect ratio: 6:1
- Empty weight: 120 kg (265 lb)
- Max takeoff weight: 210 kg (463 lb)

Performance

- Stall speed: 45 km/h (28 mph, 24 kn)
- Never exceed speed: 228 km/h (142 mph, 123 kn)
- Rate of sink: 0.8 m/s (160 ft/min) at 60 km/h (37 mph; 32 kn) and 10 kg/m^{2} (2.0 lb/sq ft) wing loading
- Lift-to-drag: 21:1 at 72 km/h (45 mph; 39 kn) and 10 kg/m^{2} (2.0 lb/sq ft) wing loading
- Wing loading: 10 kg/m^{2} (2.0 lb/sq ft)
- Landing speed: 60 km/h (37 mph; 32 kn)
