= Altinger Lenticular 15S =

Lenticular 15S

General information
- Type: Single-seat FAI Standard Class Glider
- National origin: Argentina
- Designer: Theo Altinger
- Number built: 12+

History
- First flight: 1972

The Altinger Lenticular is an Argentine single-seat FAI Standard Class glider designed and built by Theo Altinger.

== Design and development ==
The Lenticular 15S was built with financial assistance from the Argentine Soaring Association for use by flying clubs in Argentina. The glider was built in time to enter the gliding national championship in 1972.

The Lenticular 15S is a cantilever mid-wing monoplane with a glass-fibre semi-monocoque structure and a cantilever T-tail. The pilot has a fully enclosed cockpit with a transparent canopy. The Lanticular 15S has a retractable monowheel landing gear with a semi-recessed tailwheel.

== Specifications ==
Data from Jane's All the World's Aircraft 1973-74

General characteristics

- Crew: 1
- Length: 6.5 m (21 ft 4 in)
- Wingspan: 15.00 m (49 ft 2.5 in)
- Height: 1.40 m (4 ft 7 in)
- Wing area: 12.00 m^{2} (129.2 sq ft)
- Aspect ratio: 18.8
- Empty weight: 200 kg (441 lb)
- Gross weight: 310 kg (683 lb)

Performance

- Maximum speed: 235 km/h (146 mph, 127 kn)
- Stall speed: 60 km/h (37.5 mph, 32.6 kn)
- Maximum glide ratio: 32

== See also ==
- I.Ae. 34 Clen Antú
- I.Ae. 41 Urubú

Related lists

- List of gliders
