= Horten H.III =

German single-seat glider, 1937

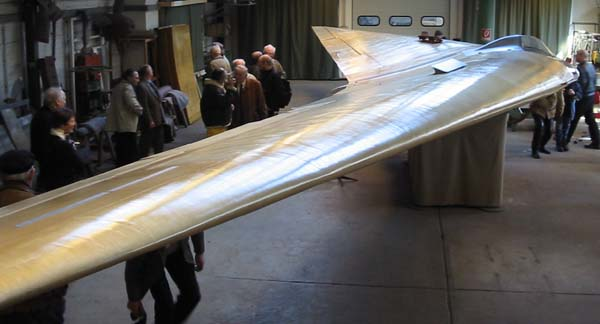
- Horten H.III at Deutsches Technikmuseum Berlin

General information
- Type: Glider
- National origin: Germany
- Manufacturer: Horten Flugzeugbau
- Designer: Walter Horten and Reimar Horten
- Number built: 19

History
- First flight: 1937
- Developed from: Horten H.II

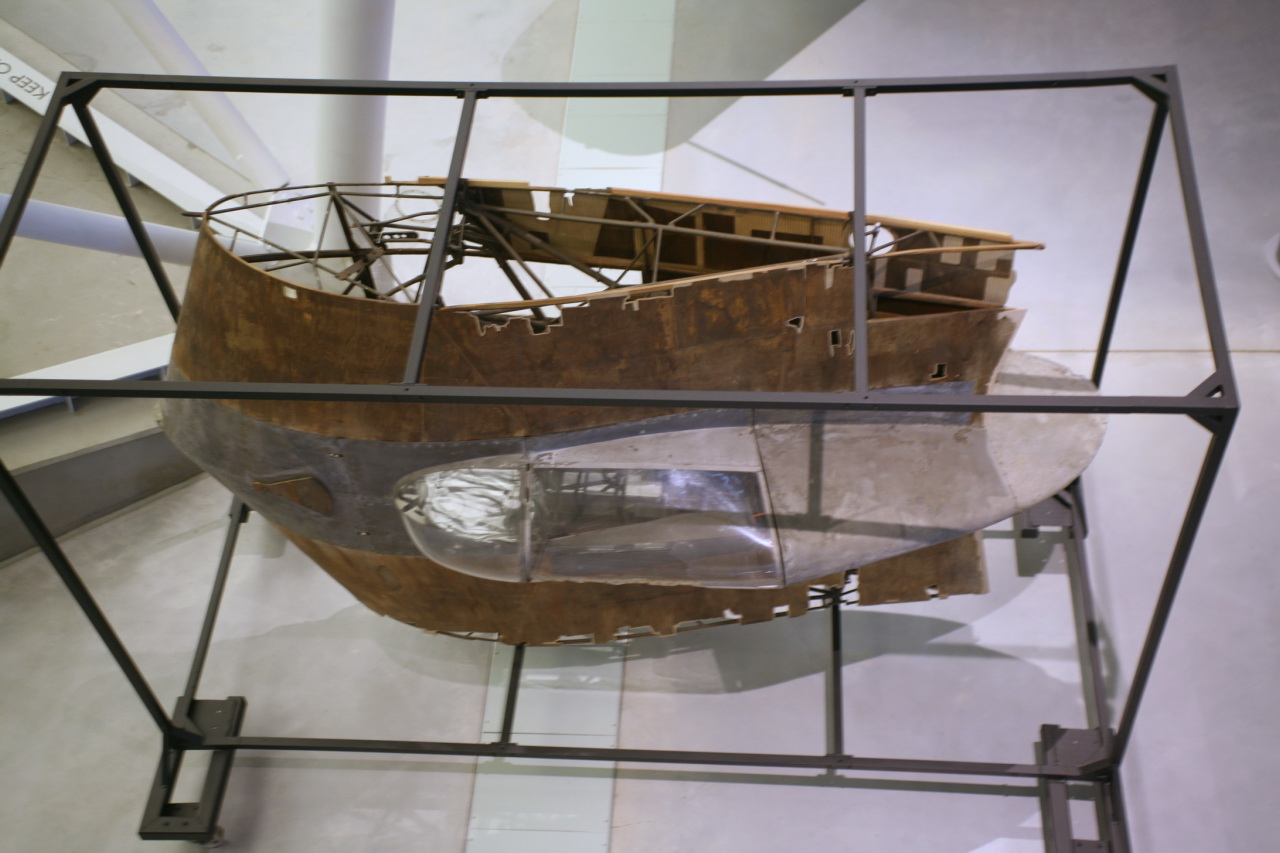
Aerofoil section at the root of a H.IIIh

The Horten H.III is a flying wing sailplane built by Walter and Reimar Horten in Germany from 1937 to 1944.

== Design ==
The H.III series was an incremental development of the Horten H.II with reduced sweepback of 23°, span increased to 20 m (65 ft 7 in) and modified lateral controls. The wing trailing edges had three movable surfaces; the innermost was a landing flap, but the outer pair were geared differential elevons with the outer elevon having a large upward deflection and only slight downward movement, conversely, the inner elevon had large downward movement and slight upward movement.

This arrangement reduced unfavorable yawing moments due to aileron by making use of differential aileron movement but avoided the change in longitudinal trim by the opposing differential of the inner flap pair. In high-speed flight, the nose down trim was provided mainly by the inner elevon section moving downwards, the outer flap deflecting only slightly; this had the advantage of relieving the tips of torsional loads at high speed. Drag rudders, similar to airbrakes fitted in modern gliders, were fitted near the wingtips, providing yaw control similar to those used in the H.II.

The first two H IIIs, an IIIa, and an IIIc (w/n 10 & 11) were built in workshops at Cologne in 1938. Subsequent H.IIIs were built at various locations including Peschke Flugzeugban in Berlin, Fürth, Giebelstadt, Minden, Bonn and Göttingen. Built specifically for the 1938 Rhön competitions the H.IIIa was found to have unsatisfactory turning performance, so the H.IIIc, to be flown by Werner Blech, was modified with a canard surface mounted above and in front of the cockpit to assist with pitch control at low speeds.

Aerodynamic balance for control surfaces was by a geared tab on the IIIa and b, but on IIId, f, and g the outer flap had a 20% Frise nose which also countered adverse yaw: out-of-balance aerodynamic loads on the elevators were trimmed by a rubber bungee trimmer with the trim datum set by the pilot.

== Operational history ==
The H.III was designed to compete at the 1938 Rhön Gliding Competitions at the Wasserkuppe and two aircraft were available at the start of the competition, to be flown by Heinz Scheidhauer and Werner Blech. As the competition progressed the two H.IIIs were achieving reasonable results with Blech leading over Scheidhauer. Near the end of the competition the weather deteriorated with cumulonimbus clouds and rain showers. Blech recognised that he could win the competition outright with a high-altitude flight in one of the clouds.

Blech warned the other pilots not to follow him into the same cloud and took an aero-tow from Walter Horten in their Focke-Wulf Fw 56 glider tug. After entering the cloud, several other pilots ignored Blechs warning, including Scheidhauer, and followed him into the large thundercloud. Several less adventurous pilots left the cloud almost immediately, but Scheidhauer's H.IIIa was severely damaged by hail and was seen fluttering to the ground closely followed by Scheidhauer hanging unconscious from his parachute, suffering from severe frostbite.

Blech was not so fortunate; his glider was later seen fluttering to the ground without its canopy and trailing a parachute bag, but a search of the wreckage found no trace of Blech, whose ice-coated body was soon found on the Wasserkuppe. When the barometer carried by the H.IIIc was checked the needle had left the trace area at 8,000 metres (26,250 ft), the limit of the barometer's range, meaning the aircraft had exceeded this altitude. Examination of Blech's body revealed a broken nose and neck, pointing to a collision with either his own aircraft, or another, after he had abandoned the H.IIIc. Scheidhauer recovered in hospital over the next six months losing two fingers of his right hand to frostbite.

Sponsored by the Luftwaffe, Walter and Reimar had four H.III gliders ready to fly in the 1939 Rhön competition, piloted by Heinz Scheidhauer, Geitner and Flakowsky representing the Luftwaffe and Gotthold Peter representing the DVL. For various reasons the H.IIIs had a lacklustre showing, with a best placing of twenty-second by Scheidhauer, (partly due to his retrieve crew having been detained by customs for four days at the Czechoslovak border, on return from a competition flight). Geitner came last due to his persistent partying at the local hostelries and subsequent lack of fitness for competition flying. All four pilots understandably bemoaned the lack of practice in flying the H.III before the competition.

At least one H.IIIb was converted as an ammunition carrier, with bays in the wings designed to house pallets loaded with ammunition, for supplying outlying army posts, but it is unclear if this aircraft carried out operational flights. Training for flying wing pilots was also carried out using two-seater H.IIIg's. Other H.IIIs carried out research into control systems.

The H.III was allocated the RLM ID number 8-250 and by inference Horten Ho 250 though this was little used in practice.

== Surviving aircraft ==
The centre section of the H.IIIh, (werknummer 31) built at Göttingen in 1944, is preserved at the Smithsonian National Air and Space Museum. The glider was captured by the British Combined Intelligence Objectives Subcommittee in 1945 at Rottweil, moved to Freman Field in America, by 1946 and transferred to Northrop Corporation at Hawthorne, California along with a Horten H.IIIf and the Horten VI V2 in 1947.

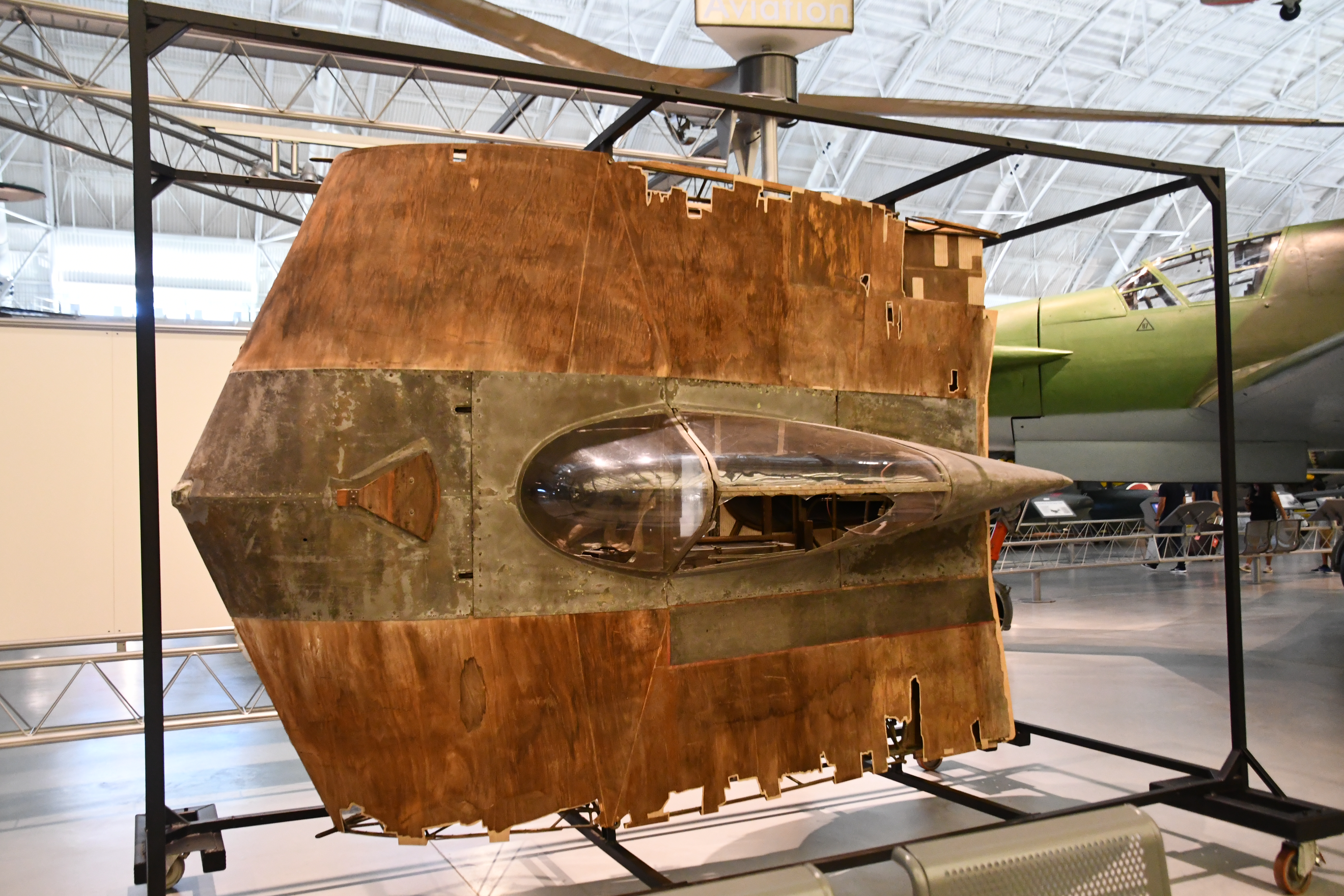
Horten Ho III h, preserved at the Steven F. Udvar-Hazy Center

== Variants ==
Horten H.IIIa
Original version, flown by Heinz Scheidhauer in the 1938 Rhön Gliding Competition. Scheidhauer entered a cumulonimbus cloud during a competition altitude flight and was next seen descending by parachute, presently followed by the hail shattered remains of his H.IIIa. Scheidhauer was suffering from frostbite and lost several fingers.
Horten H.IIIb
Similar to the H.IIIa, but with outer elevon not extending to the wing tip. Selected for production, nine were completed by 1941.

Horten H.IIIc
Identical to the H.IIIa, but with a canard surface mounted above and in front of the cockpit. One H.IIIc was built, to be flown by Werner Blech at the 1938 Rhön contest. The intention of the canard surface was to improve CL_{max}, but actual results were inconclusive. Blech flew the H.IIIc well and was leading Scheidhauer in the competition. On the same day as Scheidhauer's disastrous flight, Blech entered the same cloud as Scheidhauer after telling other pilots not to enter it after him. Blech's H.IIIc was next seen fluttering slowly to the ground without a canopy and trailing Blech's parachute bag. Blech's ice-covered body was discovered later on a rocky outcrop of the Wasserkuppe.

Horten H.IIId
A motorglider version of the H.III was produced by attaching standard H.IIIb wings to a special centre section housing the cockpit and a 32hp Volkswagen engine driving a folding propeller.

Performance as a powered aircraft included:

- Ground run 70 metres
- Rate of climb 2 m/s.
- Cruising speed 110 km/h
- Max. speed 130 km/h

Horten H.IIIe
H III glider with variable sweep and dihedral of the outer wing panels for research into control systems.

Horten H.IIIf

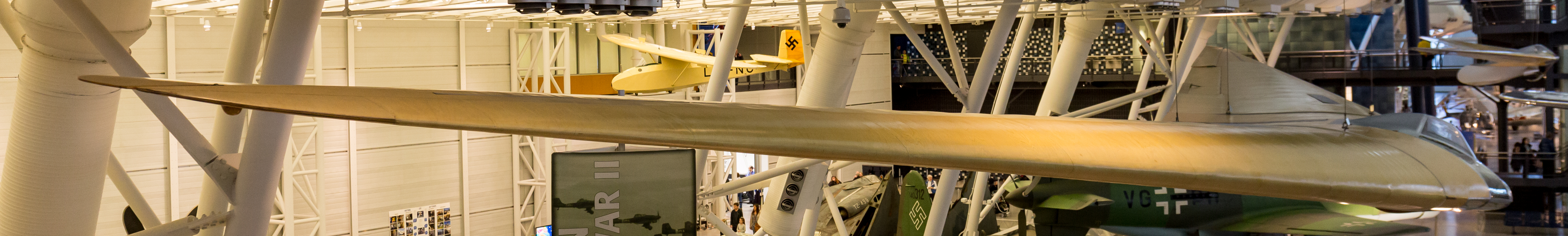
A Horten Ho.IIIf at the Udvar-Hazy Center

A H.IIIb built with a prone-position cockpit and modified control systems. Three built, one is being displayed at the Steven F. Udvar-Hazy Center.

Horten H.IIIg
Special two-seater centre section with tandem seats for training purposes. Four aircraft were built with one being converted to the sole H.IIIh.

Horten H.IIIh
A single H.IIIg modified with the a second cockpit filled with test equipment, survived the war with the remains held by the Smithsonian Institution, displayed at the Steven F. Udvar-Hazy Center.

== Specifications (Horten H.III) ==
Data from Nurflügel

General characteristics

- Crew: 1

H.IIIg: 2
H.IIIh: 2

- Wingspan: 20.5 m (67 ft 3 in)

H.IIIa: 20.4 m (67 ft)

- Wing area: 37.5 m^{2} (404 sq ft)

H.IIIa: 36 m^{2} (388 sq ft)

- Aspect ratio: 11.1

H.IIIa: 11.6

- Empty weight: 220 kg (485 lb) (H.IIIa)

H.IIIb: 250 kg (551 lb)
H.IIId: 300 kg (661 lb)
H.IIIe: 340 kg (750 lb)
H.IIIf: 280 kg (617 lb)
H.IIIg: 300 kg (661 lb)

- Max takeoff weight: 300 kg (661 lb) (H.IIIa)

H.IIIb: 330 kg (728 lb)
H.IIId: 420 kg (926 lb)
H.IIIe: 450 kg (992 lb)
H.IIIf: 360 kg (794 lb)
H.IIIg: 460 kg (1,014 lb)

- Fuel capacity:

H.IIId: 40 kg (88 lb)
H.IIIe: 30 kg (66 lb)

- Chord at root: 5 m (16 ft)
- Sweep at root: 24.3 degrees
- Aerofoil thickness: 20%
- Powerplant: 1 × H.IIId Walter Mikron inverted 4-cyl air-cooled in-line piston engine, 33 kW (44 hp) (later 1 x 48 kW (64 hp) Walter Mikron)

H.IIIe: 1 x 22 kW (30 hp) Volkswagen engine

- Propellers: 2-bladed folding propellers (H.IIId & H.IIId only)

Performance

- Maximum speed: 160 km/h (99 mph, 86 kn) H.IIId (powered level flight)

H.IIIe: 140 km/h (87 mph) (powered level flight)

- Cruise speed: 130 km/h (81 mph, 70 kn) H.IIId: (powered level flight)

H.IIIe: 130 km/h (81 mph) (powered level flight)

- Never exceed speed: 210 km/h (130 mph, 110 kn)
- Towing speed: H.IIIa 37 km/h (23 mph)

H.IIIb: 39 km/h (24 mph)
H.IIId: 44 km/h (27 mph)
H.IIIe: 46 km/h (29 mph)
H.IIIf: 41 km/h (25 mph)
H.IIIg: 46 km/h (29 mph)

- Landing speed: H.IIIa 37 km/h (23 mph)

H.IIIb: 39 km/h (24 mph)
H.IIId: 44 km/h (27 mph)
H.IIIe: 46 km/h (29 mph)
H.IIIf: 41 km/h (25 mph)
H.IIIg: 46 km/h (29 mph)

- Maximum glide ratio: H.IIIa 28 @ 60 km/h (37 mph; 32 kn) and 8.3 kg/m^{2} (1.7 lb/sq ft)

H.IIIb: 28 @ 60 km/h (37 mph; 32 kn) and 8.8 kg/m^{2} (1.8 lb/sq ft)
H.IIId: 25 @ 70 km/h (43 mph; 38 kn) and 12 kg/m^{2} (2.5 lb/sq ft)
H.IIIe: 28 @ 70 km/h (43 mph; 38 kn) and 12 kg/m^{2} (2.5 lb/sq ft)

H.IIIf: 28 @ 63 km/h (39 mph; 34 kn) and 9.6 kg/m^{2} (2.0 lb/sq ft)

H.IIIg: 28 @ 70 km/h (43 mph; 38 kn) and 12 kg/m^{2} (2.5 lb/sq ft)

- Rate of sink: 0.48 m/s (94.5 ft/min) @ 45 km/h (28 mph; 24 kn) and 8.3 kg/m^{2} (1.7 lb/sq ft) (H.IIIa)

H.IIIb: 0.5 m/s (1.6 ft/s) @ 45 km/h (28 mph; 24 kn) and 8.8 kg/m^{2} (1.8 lb/sq ft)
H.IIId: 0.6 m/s (2.0 ft/s) @ 70 km/h (43 mph; 38 kn) and 12 kg/m^{2} (2.5 lb/sq ft)
H.IIIe: 0.6 m/s (2.0 ft/s) @ 53 km/h (33 mph; 29 kn) and 12 kg/m^{2} (2.5 lb/sq ft)
H.IIIf: 0.52 m/s (1.7 ft/s) @ 47 km/h (29 mph; 25 kn) and 9.6 kg/m^{2} (2.0 lb/sq ft)
H.IIIg: 0.6 m/s (2.0 ft/s) @ 53 km/h (33 mph; 29 kn) and 12.2 kg/m^{2} (2.5 lb/sq ft)

- Wing loading: 8.3 kg/m^{2} (1.7 lb/sq ft) (H.IIIa)

H.IIIb: 8.8 kg/m^{2} (1.8 lb/sq ft)
H.IIId: 11.2 kg/m^{2} (2.3 lb/sq ft)
H.IIIe: 12 kg/m^{2} (2.5 lb/sq ft)
H.IIIf: 9.6 kg/m^{2} (2.0 lb/sq ft)
H.IIIg: 12.2 kg/m^{2} (2.5 lb/sq ft)

- Power/mass:

H.IIId: 0.0787 kW/kg (0.0479 hp/lb)
H.IIIe: 0.049 kW/kg (0.030 hp/lb)

== See also ==
- Horten Ho 229
