= Hirth HM 60 =

1920s German aircraft engine

HM 60
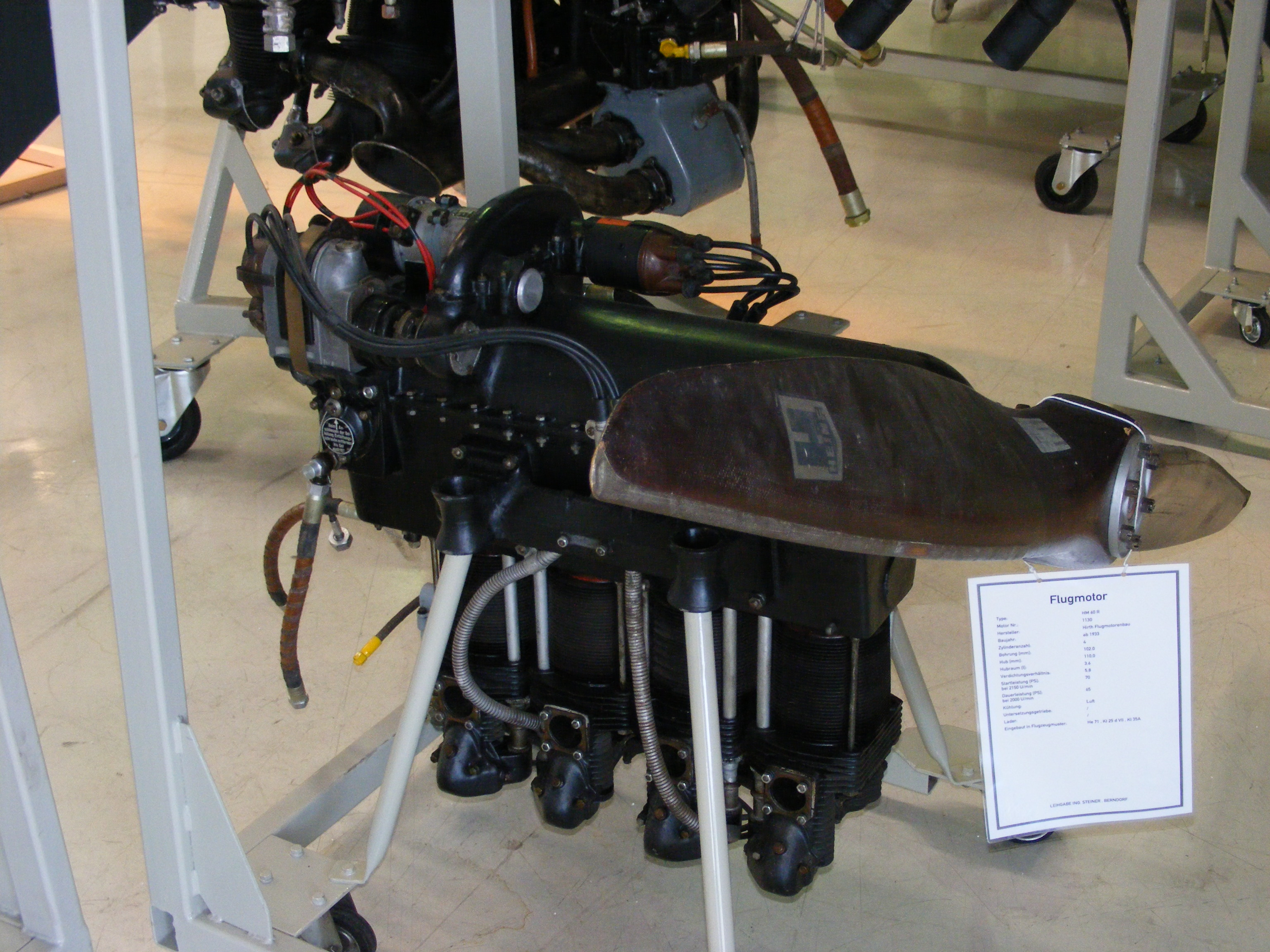
- Type: Inline piston engine
- Manufacturer: Hirth
- First run: June 1923
- Major applications: Klemm Kl 25

The Hirth HM 60 was a four-cylinder inverted air-cooled inline aircraft engine designed in 1923 and first sold in 1924. The engine was of very high quality, and its sales success contributed to Hirth's rapid pre-war expansion. It was a popular engine for light aircraft delivering 80 hp (60 kW) at 2,300 rpm. Later Hirth engines built upon the HM 60's success and provided greater power with many of the same design features.

== Variants ==
HM60
HM60R
HM60R-2

== Applications ==
- Fieseler Fi 5
- Göppingen Gö 9
- Horten H.V
- Klemm Kl 25
- Klemm Kl 35
- Klemm Kl 107
- Shackleton-Murray SM.1
- WNF Wn 16

== Specifications (HM 60R) ==
Data from Flugzeug-Typenbuch. Handbuch der deutschen Luftfahrt- und Zubehör-Industrie 1944

=== General characteristics ===
- Type: 4-cylinder air-cooled inverted in-line aircraft piston engine
- Bore: 102 mm (4.02 in)
- Stroke: 110 mm (4.33 in)
- Displacement: 3.596 L (219.4 cu in)
- Length: 840 millimetres (33.1 in)
- Width: 390 mm (15.4 in)
- Height: 722 mm (28.4 in)
- Dry weight: 91 kg (201 lb) dry, unequipped

97 kg (214 lb) wet, equipped

=== Components ===
- Valvetrain: 1x intake and 1x exhaust under-head valves per cylinder actuated pushrods and rockers
- Fuel system: SUM IFH 36 Nr.552 carburetor
- Fuel type: 74 octane gasoline
- Oil system: Dry sump with one pressure and two scavenge pumps
- Cooling system: air-cooled

=== Performance ===
- Power output:

- 80 PS (79 hp; 59 kW) at 2,400 rpm (5 minutes) at sea level
- 72 PS (71 hp; 53 kW) at 2,320 rpm (max. continuous) at sea level
- 66 PS (65 hp; 49 kW) at 2,240 rpm (cruise) at sea level

- Specific power: 22.25 PS/L (0.36 hp/cu in; 16.36 kW/L)
- Compression ratio: 5.8:1
- Specific fuel consumption: 0.23 kg/PSh (0.514 lb/(hp⋅h); 0.313 kg/kWh) at max continuous
- Oil consumption: 0.015 kg/PSh (0.034 lb/(hp⋅h); 0.020 kg/kWh) at max continuous
- Power-to-weight ratio: 0.893 PS/kg (0.400 hp/lb; 0.657 kW/kg)
- B.M.E.P.: 8.35 atm (8.46 bar; 122.7 psi)

== See also ==
Comparable engines

- Cirrus aero engines
- de Havilland Gipsy Minor
- Menasco Pirate
- Walter Minor

Related lists

- List of aircraft engines
