= Fieseler F 4 =

F 4
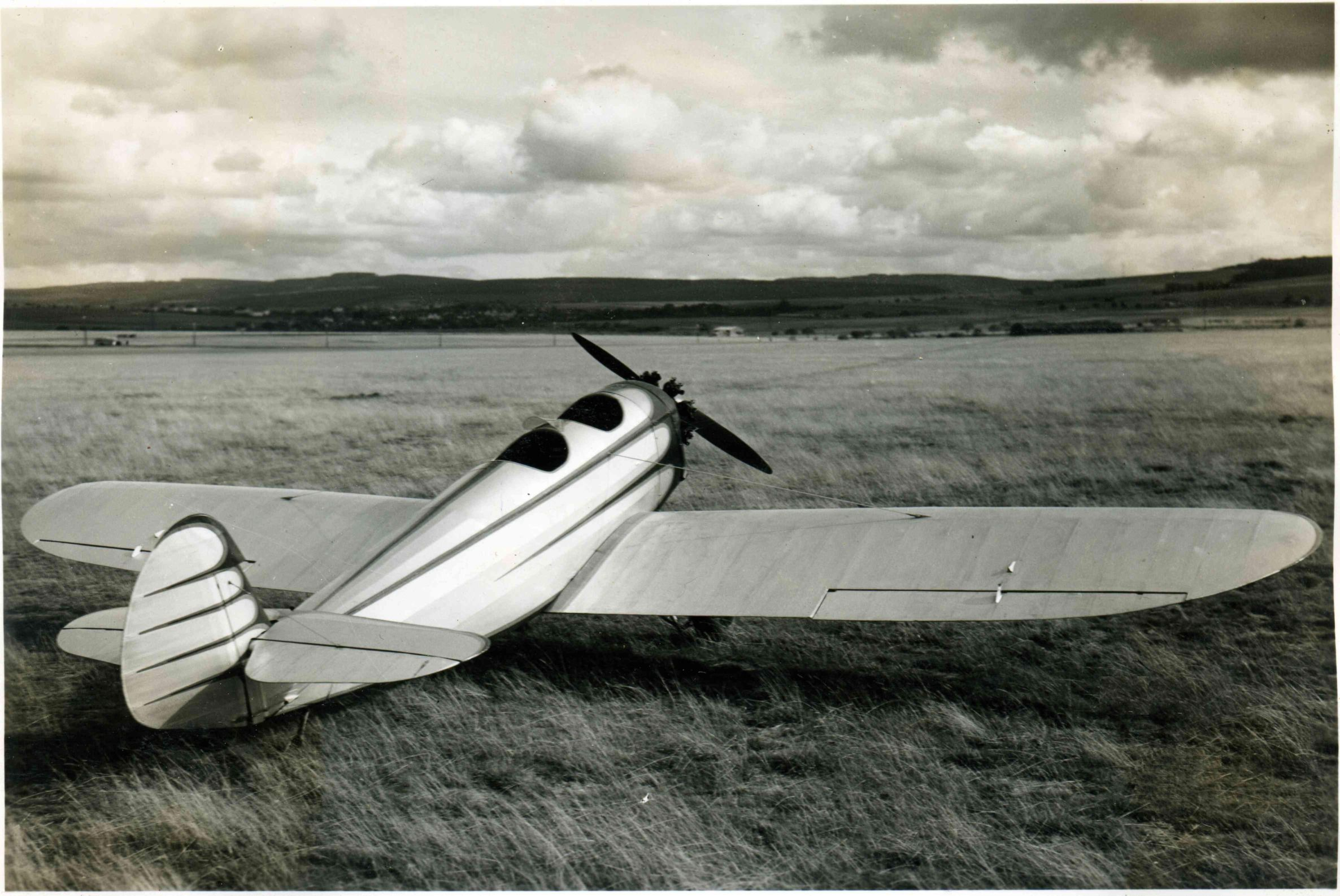

General information
- Type: 2-seat sport aircraft
- National origin: Germany
- Manufacturer: Fieseler Flugzeugbau
- Designer: Gerhard Fieseler
- Number built: 2

History
- First flight: 1932

The Fieseler F 4 was developed, built and flown as a two-seat sports and travel aircraft at the Fieseler Flugzeugbau.

== Design and development ==
After the failure of the Fieseler F 3 Wespe, Fieseler developed a sport aircraft with emphasis placed on safety, quality, efficiency, and convenience, designated Fieseler F 4.

The F 4 was a two-seat low-wing monoplane, with a welded steel tube fuselage and wooden wings covered with aircraft linen. The wings, attached to the fuselage, were braced with profile wires from the top of the fuselage and the undercarriage.

Fitted with balloon tires the undercarriage was attached forward of the centre of gravity, reducing the danger of nose-over during a difficult landing. Fuel was carried in a gravity tank and transferred using flexible hoses.

Well padded seats in the cockpits with moveable armrests increased comfort and adjustable rudder pedals accommodated pilots of varying heights. A luggage compartment behind the pilot's seat also gave access to controls and equipment in the fuselage.

Initially powered by a 35 PS (35 hp; 26 kW) Argus As 16 engine, the F 4 was later powered by a 35 PS (35 hp; 26 kW) Salmson 9 AD engine.

== Operational history ==
When it was first flown in August 1932, Gerhard Fieseler was pleased with F 4's flight characteristics revealed during flight testing despite the low engine power. The targets being confirmed by a number of measurement and test flights.

The F 4 was presented to the public in October 1932 at the German Aerospace Exhibition, offering the aircraft powered by the As 16 at RM 5,900 and RM 6,300 powered by the AD9.

Despite market interest in the F 4, Fieseler had doubts as to the success of the project despite the good market prospects. Flight testing was suspended and production plans abandoned freeing the company to develop new aircraft types.

== Specifications (F 4) ==
General characteristics

- Crew: 2
- Length: 5.8 m (19 ft 0 in)
- Wingspan: 9.5 m (31 ft 2 in)
- Height: 1.9 m (6 ft 3 in)
- Wing area: 13 m^{2} (140 sq ft)
- Empty weight: 240 kg (529 lb)
- Gross weight: 475 kg (1,047 lb)
- Fuel capacity: 235 kg (518 lb) (incl. passengers)
- Powerplant: 1 × Salmson 9 AD 9-cyl. air-cooled radial engine, 30 kW (40 hp)

Performance

- Maximum speed: 155 km/h (96 mph, 84 kn)
- Cruise speed: 135 km/h (84 mph, 73 kn)
- Stall speed: 55 km/h (34 mph, 30 kn)
- Range: 500 km (310 mi, 270 nmi)
- Service ceiling: 4,600 m (15,100 ft)
