= Guatambu =

Coordinates: 27°09′S 48°30′W

- Municipality
- The Municipality of Guatambu
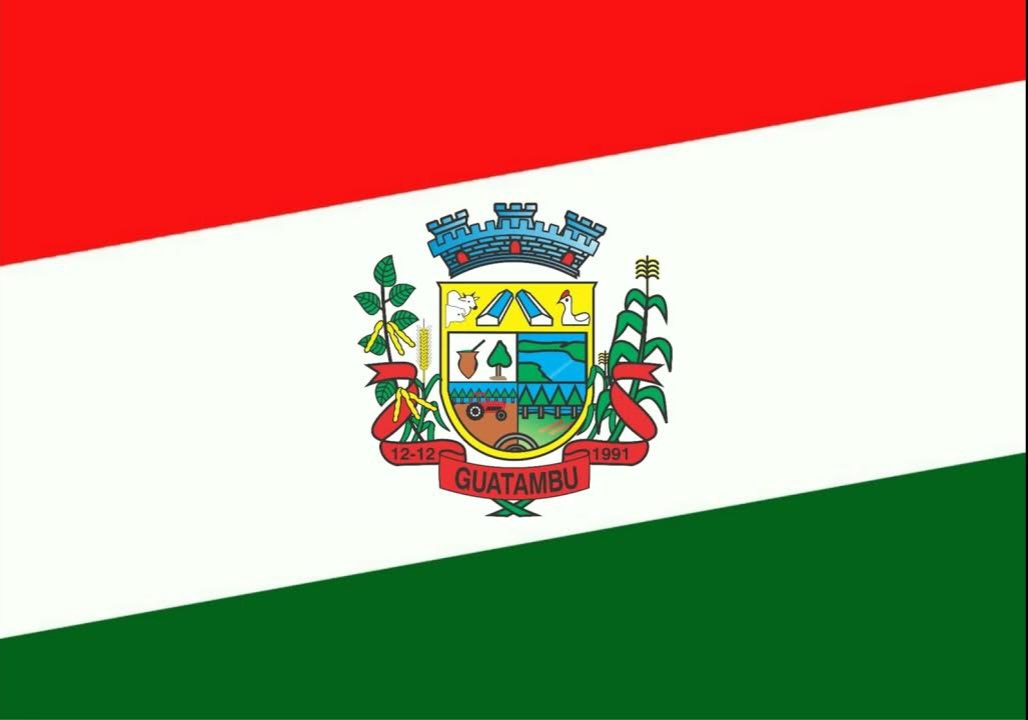
- Flag Coat of arms

- Location of Guatambu in Santa Catarina state
- Country: Brazil
- Region: South
- State: Santa Catarina
- Founded: December 12, 1991

Government
  - Mayor: Pedro Borsoi (DEM)

Area
  - Total: 204.757 km^{2} (79.057 sq mi)
- Elevation: 530 m (1,740 ft)

Population (2020)
  - Total: 4,698
  - Density: 22.94/km^{2} (59.43/sq mi)
- Time zone: UTC-3 (UTC-3)
  - Summer (DST): UTC-2 (UTC-2)
- HDI (2000): 0.737 – medium
- Website: www.guatambu.sc.gov.br

Guatambu is a municipality in the state of Santa Catarina in the South region of Brazil. Its main ethnical compositions are italian, german and cabocla.

== See also ==
- List of municipalities in Santa Catarina
