= Horten H.IV =

German single-seat glider, 1944

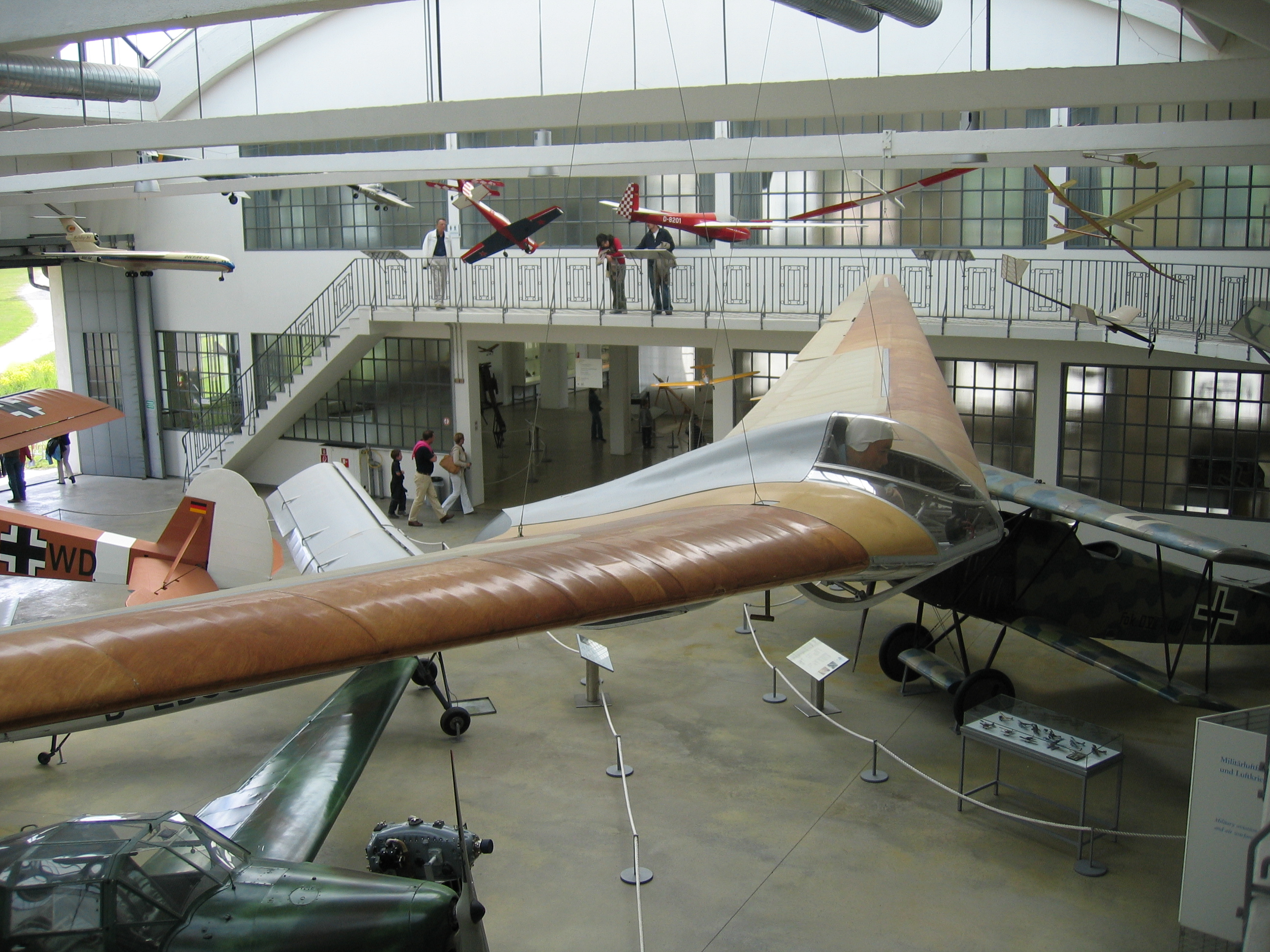
- Horten H.IV in the Deutsches Museum at Schleissheim, Munich

General information
- Type: Glider
- Manufacturer: Horten
- Designer: Reimar and Walter Horten
- Number built: 4

The Horten H.IV is a German tailless flying wing glider in which the pilot was to lie in a prone position to reduce the frontal area, and hence drag. It was designed by Reimar and Walter Horten in Göttingen. Four were built between 1941 and 1943. They were flown in a number of unofficial competitions in Germany during World War II. After the war the flying examples were transported to the United Kingdom and the United States where several contest successes were achieved.

Test pilot Captain Eric Brown describes flying a Horten IV at RAE Farnborough in May 1947 towed by a Fieseler Storch.

The H.IV was allocated the RLM ID number 8-251 and by inference Horten Ho 251 though this was little used in practice.

== Specifications ==
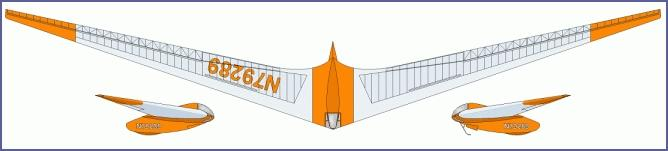
H.IV

Data from

General characteristics

- Crew: 1
- Length: 3.81 m (12 ft 6 in)
- Wingspan: 20.3 m (66 ft 7 in)
- Wing area: 18.9 m^{2} (203 sq ft)
- Aspect ratio: 21.8
- Empty weight: 250 kg (551 lb)
- Gross weight: 330 kg (728 lb)
- Airfoil thickness: 16% T/C ratio
- Sweepback at LE: 20 degrees

Performance

- Never exceed speed: 200 km/h (120 mph, 110 kn)
- Maximum glide ratio: 32 at 73 km/h (45 mph) and 17.5 kg/m^{2} (3.6 lb/sq ft)
- Rate of sink: 0.5 m/s (98 ft/min) at 60 km/h (37 mph) and 17.5 kg/m^{2} (3.6 lb/sq ft)
- Wing loading: 17.5 kg/m^{2} (3.6 lb/sq ft)
- Towing speed: 55 km/h (34 mph)
- Landing speed: 55 km/h (34 mph)

== See also ==
Related development

- Horten H.III

Related lists

- List of gliders
