= Limbach Flugmotoren =

German aircraft engine manufacturer

Limbach Flugmotoren GmbH
- Company type: Company with limited liability
- Industry: Aerospace
- Headquarters: Königswinter, Germany
- Key people: Shuide Chen and Peter Limbach
- Products: Engines
- Owner: Shuide Chen
- Website: limflug.de

Limbach Flugmotoren (Limbach Aero Engines) is a Chinese-owned company based in Germany that produces aircraft engines.

== History ==
The company is named after Peter Limbach who expanded his father's engine repair business in the 1970s in Königswinter. By May 2006, Limbach had produced more than 6000 engines. The engines are certified according to CS-22 Subpart H for use in motorgliders, CS-LSA and CS-VLA type of aircraft.

Most Limbach engines are based on the Volkswagen flat-4 boxer unit with displacement of up to 2.4 liters, and up to 160 BHP in the turbocharged model. The smaller engines, all 1700cc and some 2000cc, are based on the air cooled "Type 1" unit, also referred to as the Beetle engine. The larger engines, some 2000cc and all 2400cc, are based on the Volkswagen Wasserboxer engine. The most powerful versions of the 2400cc engines have water cooled cylinder heads as well as electronic fuel injection and electronic ignition. Limbach also makes two-stroke engines for UAV as well as uncertified versions of a few four-stroke engines for the experimental Homebuilt aircraft market. For most aviation enthusiasts though, Limbach is synonymous to the powerplant found in most German motorgliders.

By late 2011 the company planned to close due to a worsened climate in which they were unable to operate. Allegedly an open letter dated 25 August 2011 could be found on their website, saying: "Years of ever increasing regulations and requirements have been choking us. Our efforts to operate in that environment were not successful because we cannot provide the necessary resources. Additionally there are government activities that hinder our current business and we cannot make plans for the future." Around the same time, Limbach was under investigation by German authorities for the unauthorized export of engines to Iran.

In late 2011, it was announced that the Limbachs assets had been sold to Chen Shuide who tends to continue producing Limbach engines with Peter Limbach still on board.

In September 2020, Germany's intelligence services reported that motors sold to Iran were found in drones used by Houthi rebels.

Engines from subsidiary Xiamen Limbach have been used in drones by Russia during the Russian invasion of Ukraine. In October 2024, the U.S. sanctioned two companies, Xiamen Limbach Aircraft Engine Co. and Redlepus Vector Industry, involving the production of long-range attack drones for Russia, including the Garpiya.

== Products ==
=== 4 Stroke certified engines ===
- Limbach L 1700 - 59 to 67 HP
- Limbach L 2000 - 75 to 80 HP
- Limbach L 2400 - 93 to 130 HP

=== 4 Stroke engines for experimental use ===
- Limbach L 2400 DTX - 158 HP, Turbo

=== 2 Stroke Engines for UAV ===
- Limbach L275E - 20 HP
- Limbach L550E - 50 HP

== Applications ==
- Aeromot AMT-100 Ximango
- AV Leichtflugzeuge Vagabund
- Garpiya
- Grob G 109
- Hoffmann HK 36 Super Dimona
- IAI Searcher
- ICA IS-28
- JPM 01 Médoc
- Lucas L-6A
- Scheibe SF 36A (EA)
- Tri-R KIS TR-1
- Weller UW-9 Sprint
- Whisper Aircraft Whisper
- Scheibe SF 25
- Hinz BLT-ARA
- Hoffmann H-40
- Stemme S10
- Valentin Taifun
- ZALA 421-20
