= Lucas L6 =

French homebuilt aeroplane

General information
- Type: Two-seat homebuilt monoplane
- National origin: France
- Designer: Emile Lucas

History
- First flight: 4 September 1991
- Variants: Lucas L6A; Lucas L6B

The Lucas L6 is a French all-metal monoplane design for homebuilding by Emile Lucas.

== Design and development ==
The Lucas L6 is a tandem two-seat all-metal low-wing cantilever monoplane with a retractable tricycle landing gear. Two variants were designed: the L-6A long-span motor glider version and the short-span L-6B.

== Variants ==
L6A
Long-span (14 metres (46 ft)) variant with either a Limbach L2000 or Lycoming O-235 engine.
L6B
Short-span variant (8.8 metres (29 ft)) which can be fitted with a Lycoming O-235 upwards to the Lycoming O-360.

== Specifications (L6B with Lycoming O-235) ==
Data from

General characteristics

- Crew: 2
- Wingspan: 8.60 m (28 ft 3 in)
- Wing area: 13 m^{2} (140 sq ft)
- Empty weight: 480 kg (1,058 lb)
- Gross weight: 760 kg (1,676 lb)
- Fuel capacity: 140 litres (31 imp gal; 37 US gal)
- Powerplant: 1 × Lycoming O-235 , 81 kW (108 hp)

Performance

- Maximum speed: 230 km/h (140 mph, 120 kn)
- Cruise speed: 190 km/h (120 mph, 100 kn)
- Stall speed: 110 km/h (68 mph, 59 kn)
- Rate of climb: 4 m/s (790 ft/min)
- Wing loading: 57.7 kg/m^{2} (11.8 lb/sq ft)
