= Limbach L2400 =

German aircraft engine

Limbach L 2400
- Type: Piston aircraft engine
- National origin: Germany
- Manufacturer: Limbach Flugmotoren
- First run: c. 1984
- Major applications: Stemme S10

The Limbach L 2400 are a series of German piston aero-engines designed and built by Limbach Flugmotoren. It is a four-cylinder, four-stroke air-cooled flat piston engine typically between 93-130 hp (69.4-97 kW) power output.

== Variants ==
L 2400 DE3.X
Dual ignition system. 90 hp (67 kW)
L 2400 DF
Certified in March 2001, has an electronically controlled fuel injection and double ignition system. Tractor type engine with alternator in the front and starter in the back.
L 2400 DT
Certified in September 2001, has an electronically controlled fuel injection and double ignition system. Tractor type engine with alternator in the back and starter in the back.
L 2400 EB
Certified in June 1985, has a carburettor and magneto ignition system. Two carburettors in the back, alternator in the back and starter in the back. 87 hp (65 kW)
L 2400 EE
Certified in July 1999, has a carbuettor and magneto ignition system. Two carburettors in the back, alternator in the front and starter in the front.
L 2400 EF
Certified in February 1997, has an electronically controlled fuel injection and ignition system. Tractor type engine with alternator in the front and starter in the back.
L 2400 EFI
Fully electronic fuel injection. 100 hp (75 kW)
L 2400 EO.X
Single ignition system. 87 hp (65 kW)
L 2400 ET
Certified in September 2001, has an electronically controlled fuel injection and ignition system. Tractor type engine with alternator in the back and starter in the back.

== Applications ==
- Grob G 109
- Hoffmann HK 36 Super Dimona
- Hinz BLT-ARA
- Hoffmann H-40
- Stemme S10
- Valentin Taifun

== Specifications (L 2400 EF) ==
Data from L2400 series data sheet

=== General characteristics ===
- Type: Four-cylinder, four-stroke air-cooled flat piston engine
- Bore: 97 mm (4 in)
- Stroke: 82 mm (3 in)
- Displacement: 2,424 cm³
- Length: 620 mm (24 in)
- Width: 788 mm (31 in)
- Height: 380 mm (15 in)
- Dry weight: 76 kg (168 lb)

=== Components ===
- Fuel type: 92-98 Octane petrol
- Cooling system: Air-cooled

=== Performance ===
- Power output: 62 kW at 3,000 rpm
- Compression ratio: 9.5:1

== See also ==
Related lists

- Limbach Flugmotoren
- List of aircraft engines
