= Hoffmann H38 Observer =

H38 Observer
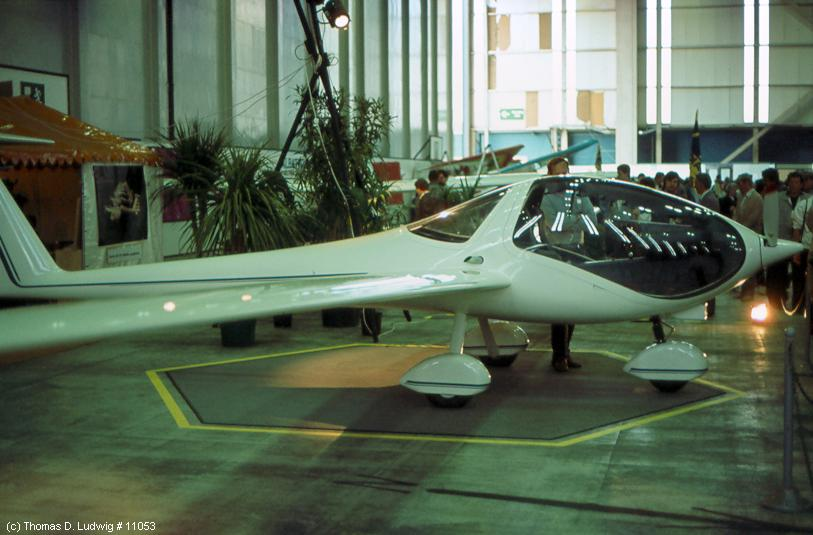
- Hoffmann Visonar / H38 Observer at ILA 1984, courtesy of TDL

General information
- Type: Observation / Project
- National origin: Germany
- Manufacturer: Wolf Hoffmann Flugzeugbau
- Designer: Wolf Hoffmann
- Number built: 1 conversion

History
- First flight: not flown

The H38 Observer is an experimental design for an observation aircraft designed by Wolf Hoffmann, in Austria, in the early 1980s.

== Design and development ==
At ILA 1984 in Hanover Wolf Hoffmann presented a mock-up for a new project based on the Hoffmann Dimona motor-glider, called Hoffmann Visonar, before being renamed. The Observer's design aim was long endurance with minimal fuel burn, combined with extremely good vision from the cockpit. To obtain this, the conventional tractor propeller is driven by a mid-mounted engine placed behind the two side-by-side seats. This location for the power-plant was intended to leave the nose clear of obstruction. Since the canopy glazing extends to the crew's feet, vision was expected to be far better than from a conventional aircraft, and not far from that from some helicopters.

The wings, rear fuselage and T-tail were identical to those of the Dimona, but with wing span increased. A choice of two engine options was proposed and provisions for versions with extended range were made for both options.

The project was not realized due to financial dispute with his former Austrian partner Hoffmann Aircraft and subsequent failure of finding a manufacturer for the H38 (as well as for the H40).

== Specifications (H38 Observer with L2000-EB1 engine) ==
Data from Jane's all the world's aircraft 1986-87

General characteristics

- Crew: 1
- Capacity: 1 pax
- Length: 7.25 m (23 ft 9 in)
- Wingspan: 16.1 m (52 ft 10 in)
- Wing area: 15.33 m^{2} (165.0 sq ft)
- Empty weight: 550 kg (1,213 lb)
- Gross weight: 850 kg (1,874 lb)
- Powerplant: 1 × Limbach L2000-EB1 4-cylinder horizontally-opposed air-cooled piston engine, 60 kW (80 hp)

Performance

- Maximum speed: 205 km/h (127 mph, 111 kn)
- Cruise speed: 190 km/h (120 mph, 100 kn)
- Range: 1,150 km (710 mi, 620 nmi)
- Maximum glide ratio: 28:1
