= Fournier RF-47 =

RF-47

General information
- Type: Two-seat light aircraft
- National origin: France
- Manufacturer: Avions Fournier

History
- First flight: 9 April 1993

The Fournier RF-47 is a 1990s French two-seat light aircraft designed and built by Avions Fournier. First flown 9 April 1993, it is a low-wing tricycle landing gear monoplane. The prototype was powered by a 90 hp (67 kW) Sauer modified Volkswagen air-cooled engine but it was intended that production aircraft would be fitted with a 90 hp (67 kW) Limbach L2400 engine with the Sauer engine as an option. The RF-47 has an enclosed cockpit with side-by-side configuration seating for two under a single piece canopy, the canopy hinges at the rear.

== Specifications (utility) ==
Data from Lambert 1994, p. 93

General characteristics

- Crew: 2
- Length: 6.25 m (20 ft 6 in)
- Wingspan: 10.00 m (32 ft 9.25 in)
- Height: 2.10 m (6 ft 10.25 in)
- Wing area: 10.60 m^{2} (114.1 sq ft)
- Empty weight: 380 kg (838 lb)
- Gross weight: 600 kg (1,323 lb)
- Powerplant: 1 × Limbach L2400 , 67 kW (90 hp)

Performance

- Maximum speed: 270 km/h (167 mph, 145 kn)
- Cruise speed: 190 km/h (118 mph, 103 kn)
- Stall speed: 72 km/h (45 mph, 39 kn)
- Service ceiling: 4,000 m (13,125 ft)
- g limits: +4.4 / -2.2
- Rate of climb: 4.00 m/s (787 ft/min)

== Bibliography ==
- Lambert, Mark, ed. (1994), All the World's Aircraft 1994–95, Coulsdon, Surrey, United Kingdom: Jane's Information Group, ISBN 0-7106-1160-9
