= H40 =

H40 may refer to:

- H-40 (Michigan county highway)
- H-40 (keelboat) a sailing yacht designed by Hans Groop
- H40 (Long Island bus)
- Glaucoma
- HMS Anthony (H40), a Royal Navy A-class destroyer
- Hoffmann H40, a German prototype sports plane
