= CAC Fox =

None

General information
- Type: Reconnaissance and electronics warfare UAV
- National origin: France
- Manufacturer: CAC Systèmes, EADS

The CAC Fox is a small UAV developed in France for use as a reconnaissance aircraft and for electronic warfare. About a thousand have been sold in a number of variants, with generally similar appearance and specifications.

The Fox-TX can carry a variety of payloads for radar or radio communications jamming; radar identification and location; communications intercept; or, when fitted with a warhead and a radar-homing seeker, anti-radar attack. The Fox-TX can also carry two small underwing stores.

== Variants ==
- Fox-AT1 - Short range battlefield reconnaissance variant. The Fox-AT1 has a shorter wingspan of 3.6 metres (11 feet 10 inches); a deeper fuselage; and a sensor payload of 15 kilograms (33 pounds), consisting of day or night imaging systems, chemical sensors, or customer-specified payload. Unlike the Fox-TX, the Fox-AT1 has a skid to permit belly landings. It can carry four small underwing stores. Endurance is only an hour and a half. French forces have used the Fox-AT1 for tactical reconnaissance in the Balkans.
- Fox-AT2 - Long range battlefield reconnaissance variant. The Fox-AT2 looks much like the Fox-AT1, but has the wider 4-meter wingspan. It can carry a heavier sensor payload of 30 kilograms (66 pounds), but only two wings stores, and uses a long-range radio communications link.
- Fox-TS1 - Expendable target, with the short 3.6 meter wingspan. It can carry chaff, flares, radar enhancement devices, and other target gear.

== Specifications (Fox-TX) ==
General characteristics

- Crew: None
- Capacity: 30 kg (66 lb) payload
- Length: 2.75 m (9 ft 0 in)
- Wingspan: 4.00 m (13 ft 1 in)
- Empty weight: 73 kg (161 lb)
- Gross weight: 135 kg (298 lb)
- Powerplant: 1 × Limbach L275E , 16 kW (22 hp)

Performance

- Maximum speed: 180 km/h (110 mph, 96 kn)
- Endurance: 5 hours
- Service ceiling: 3,000 m (9,800 ft)
