= Weller Flugzeugbau =

German aircraft manufacturer

- Company type: Privately held company
- Industry: Aerospace
- Founded: 1987
- Headquarters: Biberfeld, Schwäbisch Hall, Germany
- Products: Ultralight aircraft Aircraft repairs and welding
- Owner: Roman Weller
- Website: www.weller-flugzeugbau.de

Weller Flugzeugbau (English: Weller Aircraft Construction) is a German aircraft manufacturer, owned by Roman Weller and based in Biberfeld. The company was founded in 1987 and in 2012 had two employees. It specializes in the design and manufacture of ultralight aircraft, aircraft parts and aircraft repairs. The company has done contract specialized welding for automotive companies, including DaimlerChrysler, Porsche and BMW as well as work for aircraft manufacturers, including Scheibe Flugzeugbau and Sauer aircraft engines, and aviation museums, such as the Musée de l'Air, Deutsches Museum and the Technikmuseum Speyer.

== Aircraft ==
Summary of aircraft built by Weller Flugzeugbau
Model name	First flight	Number built	Type
Weller ULI NG	2010		Ultralight aircraft
Weller UW-9 Sprint			Ultralight aircraft
Weller Vickers Blériot			Replica of the Blériot XI
Weller Uli V2	2013		Ultralight aircraft
Weller Uli V3 "Rebell"	2013		Ultralight aircraft
