= Whisper Aircraft Whisper =

South African two-seat kit aircraft

Whisper
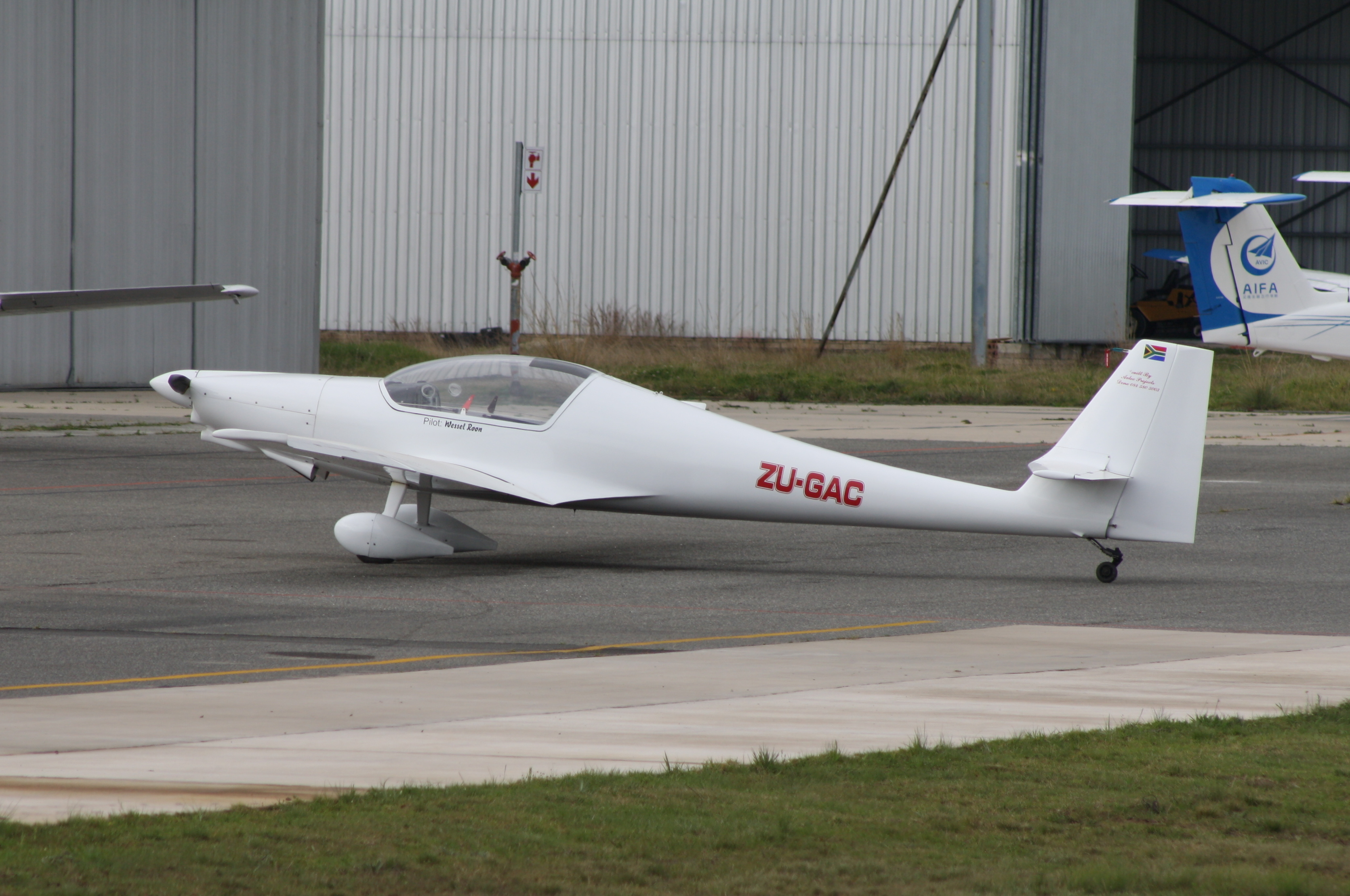

General information
- Type: Motor glider
- National origin: South Africa
- Manufacturer: Whisper Aircraft
- Designer: Russell Phillips
- Status: In production
- Number built: 30 (2020)

History
- Developed into: Whisper X350 Generation II

The Whisper Aircraft Whisper motor glider is a South African two-seat kit aircraft that was designed by Russell Phillips in 2004 and is produced by Whisper Aircraft of Port Elizabeth. Major assemblies are completed at the factory with assembly intended to be completed by the owner. It is powered by a four-cylinder Limbach L2000 aero engine with options for the 85 hp (63 kW) Jabiru 2200 and 80 hp (60 kW) Rotax 912 available.

The design was developed into the Whisper X350 Generation II kit aircraft in 2015.

== Specifications ==
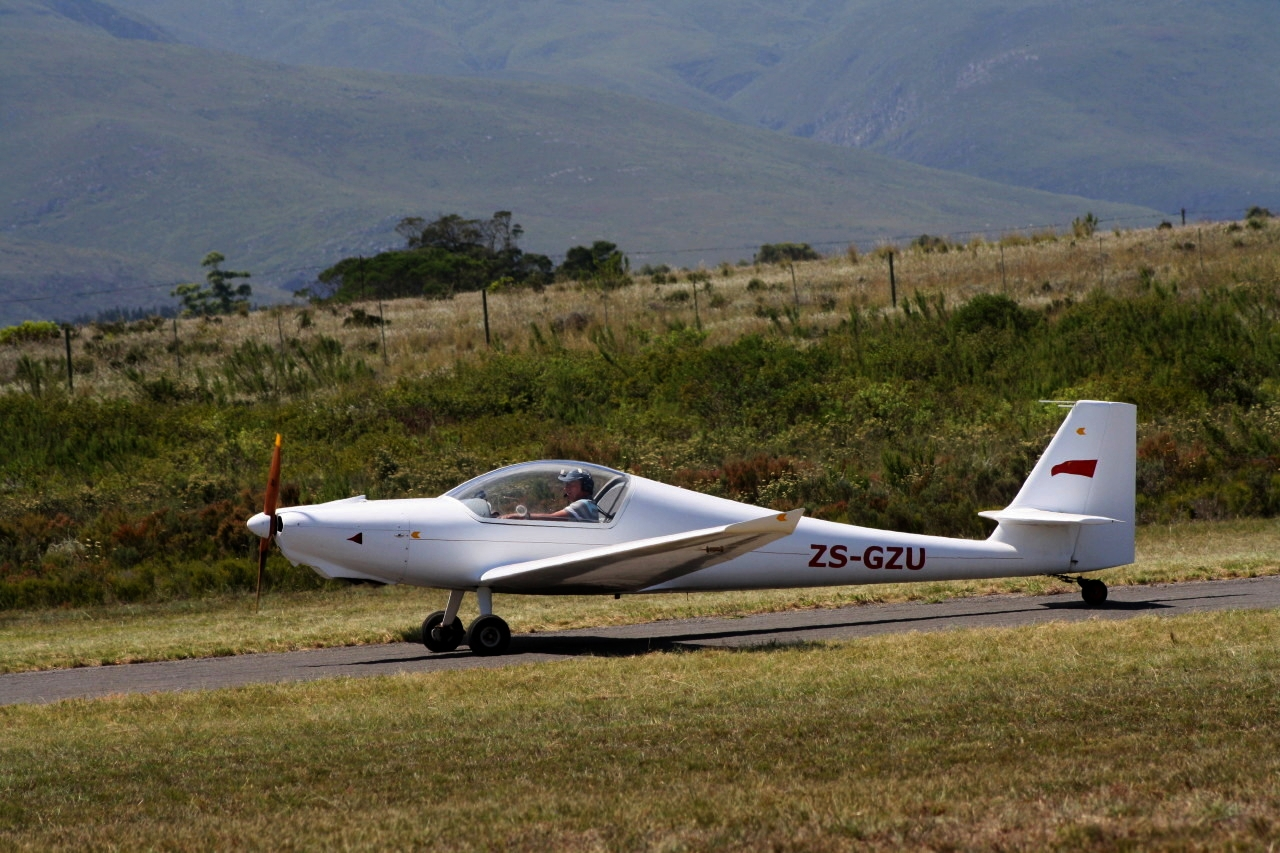
Whisper

Data from Whisper Aircraft

General characteristics

- Crew: 1 pilot
- Capacity: 1 passenger
- Length: 7.16 m (23 ft 6 in)
- Wingspan: 16 m (52 ft 6 in)
- Wing area: 15 m^{2} (160 sq ft)
- Aspect ratio: 17.07
- Empty weight: 500 kg (1,102 lb)
- Gross weight: 775 kg (1,709 lb)
- Fuel capacity: 85 L
- Powerplant: 1 × Limbach L2000 ,four-cylinder, four-stroke aircraft engine, 56 kW (75 hp)
- Propellers: 2-bladed Hoffmann, 3 position or fixed pitch

Performance

- Maximum speed: 210 km/h (130 mph, 110 kn)
- Cruise speed: 180 km/h (110 mph, 97 kn)
- Stall speed: 72 km/h (45 mph, 39 kn)
- Never exceed speed: 250 km/h (160 mph, 130 kn)
- Range: 1,200 km (750 mi, 650 nmi)
- Maximum glide ratio: 28
- Rate of climb: 3.6 m/s (710 ft/min)
- Rate of sink: 0.9 m/s (180 ft/min)
- Wing loading: 51.67 kg/m^{2} (10.58 lb/sq ft)

== See also ==
- Europa XS
- Grob G 109
