= Whisper X350 Generation II =

South African kit aircraft design

X350 Generation II

General information
- Type: Amateur-built aircraft
- National origin: South Africa
- Manufacturer: Whisper Aircraft
- Status: In production (2020)

History
- Developed from: Whisper Aircraft Whisper

The Whisper X350 Generation II is a South African amateur-built aircraft, designed in 2015 and produced by Whisper Aircraft of Mossel Bay. The aircraft was developed from the 2004-designed Whisper Aircraft Whisper motorglider. The X350 Generation II is supplied as a kit for amateur construction.

The X350 Generation II designation indicates a design top speed goal of 350 km/h (189 kn), with the larger engine fitted.

== Design and development ==
The aircraft features a cantilever low-wing, a two-seats-in-side-by-side configuration enclosed cockpit that is 47.2 in (119.9 cm) wide, under an acrylic plastic articulated lift-up bubble canopy. It has fixed optionally tricycle landing gear or conventional landing gear and a single engine in tractor configuration.

The aircraft is predominately made from vacuum-bagged, post-cured carbon fibre composites, with E-glass used for non-structural parts, including the engine cowling, aircraft fairings, wing and tail tips. The structure is 10% anodized aluminum and cadmium-plated steel, with the landing gear legs made from steel.

The design's 26.17 ft (8.0 m) span wing has an area of 122 sq ft (11.3 m^{2}) and mounts plain flaps and features a cruciform tail. The aircraft's recommended engine power range is 160 to 200 hp (119 to 149 kW) and standard engines used include the 160 hp (119 kW) Lycoming O-320, the 180 hp (134 kW) Lycoming O-360, the 200 hp (149 kW) Lycoming IO-390, or the 180 to 200 hp (134 to 149 kW) ULPower UL520i four-stroke powerplants.

The fuel capacity is 32 U.S. gallons (120 L; 27 imp gal) in two fuselage tanks, although future production kits will have 63 U.S. gallons (240 L; 52 imp gal) in a wet wing.

The design has a single centre console-mounted side-stick or optional individual centre stick controls. The ailerons are actuated via push rods, while the elevator has push rods to the tailcone and then cables. The rudder is cable-actuated. There is no elevator trim tab system, but it may be included as a future factory option. Evaluation flights indicated neutral longitudinal stability, however, reducing the need for one. The left seat is equipped with toe-brakes.

The 51% compliant kit includes a mated fuselage and pre-closed wing structures. The aircraft can be constructed in a two-car garage. Construction time from the supplied kit is estimated by the manufacturer as 500 hours.

The design as load factors of +6/-4 g, but is not designed for aerobatics. The instrument panel is made from aluminum. The seats and rudder pedals are independently adjustable. There are optional rear fuselage windows for improved visibility, LED navigation lights and strobe lights on the wing tips and tail. Lightning protection is a factory option.

== Operational history ==
By May 2020 one example had been registered in the United States with the Federal Aviation Administration.

In a 2020 review, Kitplanes writer LeRoy Cook stated, "the Whisper is a sharp-looking side-by-side two-seater, particularly when perched on tailwheel landing gear. Tricycle gear will probably be a popular option, out of necessity for tamer handling and greater tolerance of gusty winds." Cook noted from his evaluation flight, "from my brief sampling, I’d like to see a little more cockpit ventilation, more foot room after the wing fuel system is installed, and enhanced stability with an elevator trim system. I’d also like to revisit it with tricycle gear." He concluded, "there’s a lot to like about the Whisper X350 Gen II: its sleek looks, the blazing cruise speed, a roomy cockpit, and an apparent ease of assembly."

== Specifications (X350 Gen II) ==
Data from Kitplanes and manufacturer

General characteristics

- Crew: one
- Capacity: one passenger
- Length: 6.86 m (22 ft 6 in)
- Wingspan: 7.98 m (26 ft 2 in)
- Wing area: 11.3 m^{2} (122 sq ft)
- Empty weight: 550 kg (1,213 lb) (typical)
- Gross weight: 970 kg (2,138 lb)
- Fuel capacity: 63 U.S. gallons (240 L; 52 imp gal) in three fuselage tanks
- Powerplant: 1 × Lycoming O-360 four-cylinder, air-cooled, four-stroke, horizontally-opposed, piston aircraft engine, 130 kW (180 hp)
- Propellers: 2-bladed Whirl Wind Propellers GA 220L, ground adjustable

Performance

- Maximum speed: 341 km/h (212 mph, 184 kn)
- Cruise speed: 324 km/h (201 mph, 175 kn) at 75% power
- Stall speed: 96 km/h (60 mph, 52 kn) flaps down
- Range: 1,830 km (1,137 mi, 988 nmi)
- Endurance: 6.6 hours
- Service ceiling: 7,800 m (25,500 ft)
- g limits: +6/-4
- Rate of climb: 7.8 m/s (1,540 ft/min)
- Wing loading: 86.3 kg/m^{2} (17.67 lb/sq ft)
