= Weller ULI NG =

German ultralight aircraft

ULI NG
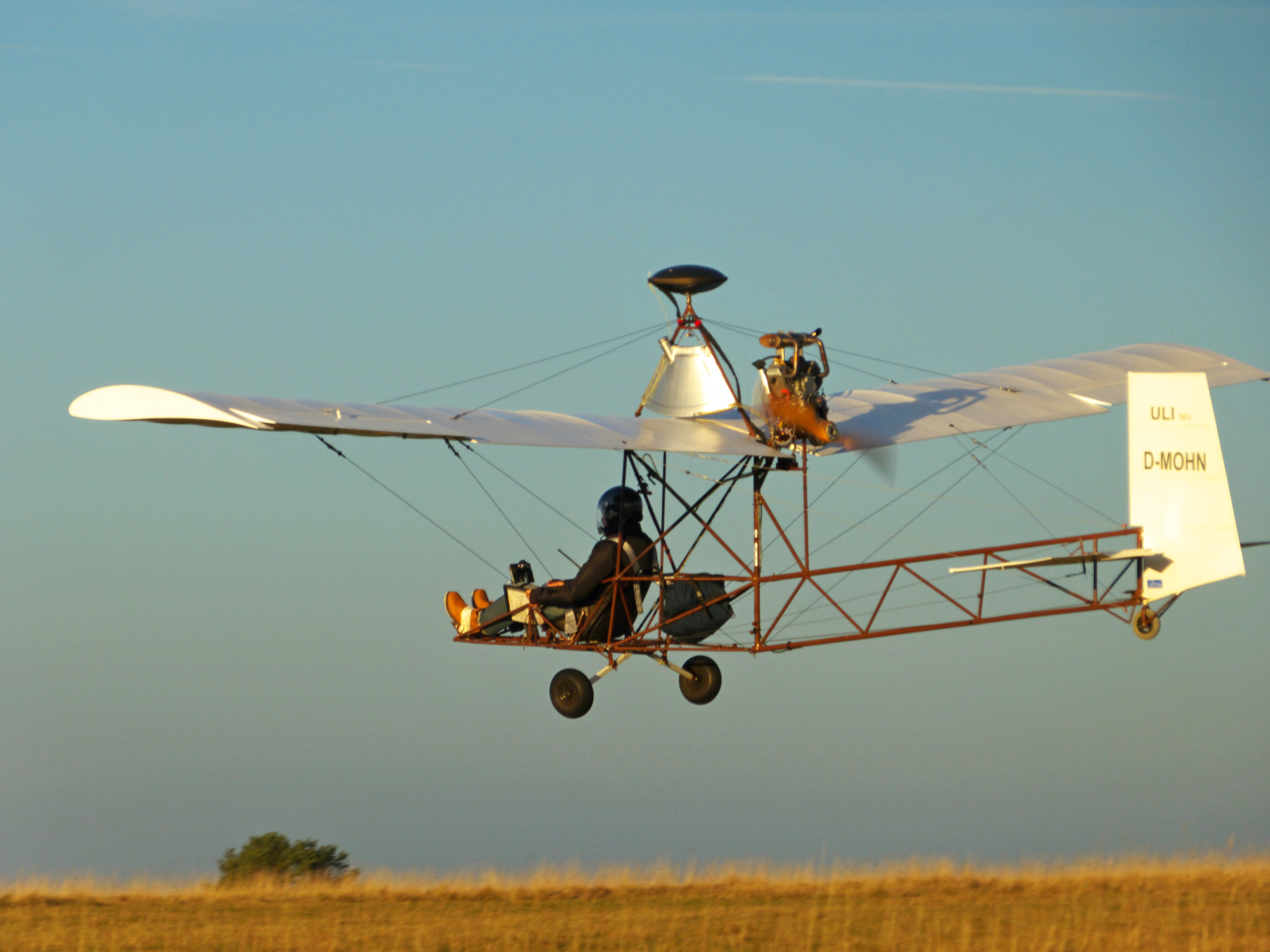

General information
- Type: Ultralight aircraft
- National origin: Germany
- Manufacturer: Weller Flugzeugbau
- Status: In production (2012)

History
- Introduction date: 2010
- Developed from: Egon Scheibe Uli 1

The Weller ULI NG (New Generation), sometimes called the Weller Uli NG, is a German ultralight aircraft, designed and produced by Weller Flugzeugbau of Bibersfeld. It was introduced at the Aero show held in Friedrichshafen in 2010. The aircraft is supplied as a complete ready-to-fly-aircraft.

== Design and development ==
The aircraft is derived from the Egon Scheibe Uli 1 and was re-designed to comply with the German 120 kg (265 lb) class ultralight rules. It features a cable-braced high-wing, a single-seat open cockpit without a windshield, fixed conventional landing gear and a single engine in pusher configuration.

The aircraft fuselage is made from welded steel tubing, the wing built from bolted-together aluminum tubing, with its flying surfaces covered in aircraft fabric. Its 9.68 m (31.8 ft) span wing has an area of 12.78 m^{2} (137.6 sq ft), giving a very light wing loading of 17.0 kg/m^{2} (3.5 lb/sq ft). The standard engine available is the 30 hp (22 kW) Briggs & Stratton industrial four-stroke powerplant with a V-belt reduction drive, powering a two bladed wooden propeller. The engine burns 5 litres (1.1 imp gal; 1.3 US gal) per hour at cruise. The aircraft's 18 litres (4.0 imp gal; 4.8 US gal) fuel tank is detachable for refueling and is filled with premium auto-fuel. The design incorporates a ballistic parachute whole-aircraft rescue system that includes an ignition cut-off upon firing.

== Specifications (version) ==
Data from Bayerl, Tacke and Weller

General characteristics

- Crew: one
- Length: 5.92 m (19 ft 5 in)
- Wingspan: 9.68 m (31 ft 9 in)
- Wing area: 12.78 m^{2} (137.6 sq ft)
- Empty weight: 119.5 kg (263 lb)
- Gross weight: 220 kg (485 lb)
- Fuel capacity: 18 litres (4.0 imp gal; 4.8 US gal) removable tank
- Powerplant: 1 × Briggs & Stratton two cylinder, air-cooled, four stroke aircraft engine, with a V-belt reduction drive, 22 kW (30 hp)
- Propellers: 2-bladed wooden

Performance

- Maximum speed: 95 km/h (59 mph, 51 kn)
- Cruise speed: 80 km/h (50 mph, 43 kn)
- Stall speed: 45 km/h (28 mph, 24 kn)
- Range: 150 km (93 mi, 81 nmi)
- Endurance: 2:30 plus reserve
- Rate of climb: 2 m/s (390 ft/min)
- Wing loading: 17.0 kg/m^{2} (3.5 lb/sq ft)
