= Limbach L275E =

German aircraft engine

- Type: Aircraft engine
- National origin: Germany
- Manufacturer: Limbach Flugmotoren
- Major applications: CAC Fox

The Limbach L275E is a German aircraft engine, designed and produced by Limbach Flugmotoren of Königswinter for use in UAVs.

== Design and development ==
The L275E is a twin-cylinder horizontally-opposed two-stroke, air-cooled, direct-drive petrol engine design, based upon the Volkswagen air-cooled engine. It employs a single magneto ignition, two carburettors, is lubricated by oil mixture lubrication with a fuel to oil ratio of 25:1 for mineral oil or 50:1 for synthetic oil and produces 15 kW (20 hp) at 7200 rpm.

== Applications ==
- CAC Fox

== Specifications (L275E) ==
Data from World Directory of Leisure Aviation 2011-12 and manufacturer

=== General characteristics ===
- Type: Twin-cylinder, two-stroke aircraft engine
- Bore: 66 mm (2.6 in)
- Stroke: 40 mm (1.6 in)
- Displacement: 274 cc (16.7 cu in)
- Length: 255 mm (10.0 in)
- Width: 400 mm (15.7 in)
- Height: 261 mm (10.3 in)
- Dry weight: 7.2 kg (15.9 lb)

=== Components ===
- Fuel type: 90 RON octane unleaded petrol or 100 LL Avgas
- Oil system: oil mixture lubrication, 25:1 fuel to oil ratio for mineral oil, 50:1 for synthetic oil
- Cooling system: air

=== Performance ===
- Power output: 15 kW (20 hp)

== See also ==
Related lists

- List of aircraft engines
