= Lucas L6B =

French homebuilt aeroplane

L-6B

General information
- Type: Homebuilt aircraft
- National origin: France
- Designer: Émile Lucas
- Status: Plan no longer available (2014)

History
- Developed from: Lucas L6; Lucas L-6A

The Lucas L-6B (sometimes L6B) is a French homebuilt aircraft that was designed by Émile Lucas. When it was available the aircraft was supplied in the form of plans for amateur construction.

== Design and development ==
The L-6B is a sport touring aircraft derived from the Lucas L6 and Lucas L-6A. It features a cantilever low-wing, a two-seats-in-tandem enclosed cockpit under a bubble canopy, retractable tricycle landing gear and a single engine in tractor configuration. It is noted for its high service ceiling of 6,096 m (20,000 ft) and 1,770 km (1,100 mi) range.

The aircraft is made from sheet aluminum. Its 8.84 m (29.0 ft) span wing mounts flaps and has a wing area of 13.01 m^{2} (140 sq ft). The wing is a complex shape with a swept wing root, transitioning to a forward swept leading edge, with a straight tapered trailing edge, resulting in a highly tapered wing planform. The outer wing section can be folded for ground transport or storage. There are optional additional span wing tip extensions to increase glide performance. The cabin width is 71 cm (28 in) and fuel tanks are located in the wing leading edge. The acceptable power range is 108 to 180 hp (81 to 134 kW) and the standard engines used are the 108 hp (81 kW) Lycoming O-235 and the 180 hp (134 kW) Lycoming O-360 powerplant.

The L-6B has a typical empty weight of 481 kg (1,060 lb) and a gross weight of 721 kg (1,590 lb), giving a useful load of 240 lb (110 kg). With full fuel of 150 litres (33 imp gal; 40 US gal) the payload for the pilot, passengers and baggage is 131 lb (59 kg).

The manufacturer estimated the construction time from the supplied kit as 4000 hours.

== Operational history ==
By 1998 the company reported that five kits had been sold and two aircraft were completed and flying.

== Specifications (L-6B) ==
Data from AeroCrafter

General characteristics

- Crew: one
- Capacity: one passenger
- Length: 7.92 m (26.00 ft)
- Wingspan: 6.10 m (20.00 ft)
- Wing area: 13.01 m^{2} (140.0 sq ft)
- Empty weight: 481 kg (1,060 lb)
- Gross weight: 721 kg (1,590 lb)
- Fuel capacity: 40 U.S. gallons (150 L; 33 imp gal)
- Powerplant: 1 × Lycoming O-235 four cylinder, air-cooled, four stroke aircraft engine, 81 kW (108 hp)
- Propellers: 2-bladed variable pitch

Performance

- Maximum speed: 190 km/h (120 mph, 100 kn)
- Cruise speed: 174 km/h (108 mph, 94 kn)
- Range: 1,800 km (1,100 mi, 960 nmi)
- Service ceiling: 6,100 m (20,000 ft)
- Wing loading: 55 kg/m^{2} (11.3 lb/sq ft)
