= Weller UW-9 Sprint =

German ultralight aircraft

UW-9 Sprint

General information
- Type: Ultralight aircraft
- National origin: Germany
- Manufacturer: Weller Flugzeugbau
- Status: In production (2012)

The Weller UW-9 Sprint is a German ultralight aircraft designed and produced by Weller Flugzeugbau of Bibersfeld. The aircraft is supplied as a kit for amateur construction or as a complete ready-to-fly-aircraft.

== Design and development ==
The UW-9 is intended as a nostalgic 1930s style design that would comply with the Fédération Aéronautique Internationale microlight rules. It features a strut-braced parasol wing, a two-seats-in-tandem open cockpit, fixed conventional landing gear and a single engine in tractor configuration.

The aircraft fuselage is made from welded steel tubing, with bolted-together aluminum tubing spar ladder-construction wings, all covered in doped aircraft fabric. Its 9.8 m (32.2 ft) span wing has an area of 13.3 m^{2} (143 sq ft) and a cut-out in the centre trailing edge for rear cockpit access. The wing is supported by "V"-struts and jury struts. The tailplane is also supported by "V"-struts. Standard engines available are the 70 hp (52 kW) Sauer UL 2100, the 75 hp (56 kW) Limbach L2000EA, the 100 hp (75 kW) Rotax 912ULS four-stroke powerplants, or the 85 hp (63 kW) Rotec R2800 radial engine. The Sprint is approved for aero-towing gliders and banner towing in Germany.

== Specifications (version) ==
Data from Bayerl and Weller

General characteristics

- Crew: one
- Capacity: one passenger
- Length: 5.7 m (18 ft 8 in)
- Wingspan: 9.8 m (32 ft 2 in)
- Height: 2.5 m (8 ft 2 in)
- Wing area: 13.3 m^{2} (143 sq ft)
- Empty weight: 290 kg (639 lb)
- Gross weight: 472.5 kg (1,042 lb)
- Fuel capacity: 87 litres (19 imp gal; 23 US gal)
- Powerplant: 1 × Sauer UL2100 four cylinder, air-cooled, four stroke aircraft engine, 52 kW (70 hp)
- Propellers: 3-bladed composite

Performance

- Maximum speed: 170 km/h (110 mph, 92 kn)
- Cruise speed: 130 km/h (81 mph, 70 kn)
- Stall speed: 62 km/h (39 mph, 33 kn)
- Range: 630 km (390 mi, 340 nmi)
- Endurance: 7 hours
- Maximum glide ratio: 10.5:1
- Rate of climb: 6.8 m/s (1,340 ft/min)
- Wing loading: 35.5 kg/m^{2} (7.3 lb/sq ft)
