= Lucas L-6A =

French motor glider

L-6A

General information
- Type: Motor glider
- National origin: France
- Designer: Emile Lucas
- Number built: 2 (2002)

History
- Developed from: Lucas L6
- Variant: Lucas L-6B

The Lucas L-6A, also called the L6A, is a French low-wing, two-seats in tandem motor glider that was designed by Emile Lucas of Lagny-le-Sec in the form of plans for amateur construction.

== Design and development ==
The L-6A was developed as a motor glider version of the Lucas L6 light aircraft.

The L-6A is of all-metal construction. The 14 m (46 ft) span wing can be folded for ground transportation or storage and the wing tips are removable. The landing gear is of a retractable conventional landing gear configuration. The recommended engines are the Lycoming O-235 of 75 to 100 kW (101 to 134 hp) or the Limbach L2000 of 60 kW (80 hp).

The L-6A was only available as plans and no kits or completed aircraft were factory-made. The plans cost US$400 in 2002 and at that time two examples were reported complete and flying. The construction time is estimated as 4000 hours.

== Specifications (L-6A) ==
Data from Purdy

General characteristics

- Crew: one
- Capacity: one passenger
- Length: 7.9 m (26 ft)
- Wingspan: 14 m (46 ft)
- Wing area: 16.0 m^{2} (172 sq ft)
- Empty weight: 435 kg (960 lb)
- Gross weight: 626 kg (1,380 lb)
- Fuel capacity: 95 litres (21 imp gal; 25 US gal)
- Powerplant: 1 × Limbach L2000 , 60 kW (80 hp)
- Propellers: 2-bladed variable pitch

Performance

- Maximum speed: 140 km/h (90 mph, 78 kn)
- Cruise speed: 121 km/h (75 mph, 65 kn)
- Stall speed: 76 km/h (47 mph, 41 kn)
- Range: 800 km (500 mi, 430 nmi)
- Service ceiling: 5,800 m (19,000 ft)
- Maximum glide ratio: 20:1
- Wing loading: 39.2 kg/m^{2} (8.02 lb/sq ft)

== See also ==
- List of gliders
