= AV Vagabund =

German ultralight aircraft

Vagabund

General information
- Type: Ultralight aircraft
- National origin: Germany
- Manufacturer: AV Leichtflugzeuge
- Status: In production
- Number built: 4 (1998)

The AV Leichtflugzeuge Vagabund (English: Vagabond) is a German ultralight aircraft that was designed by Birk Meier, Hans Grannemann and Robert Kaps and produced by AV Leichtflugzeuge of Haren, Germany. The aircraft is supplied as a kit or plans for amateur construction or as a complete ready-to-fly-aircraft.

The design was marketed in the 1990s by Aircraft Coverings of Bad Essen, Germany.

== Design and development ==
The Vagabund was designed to comply with the Fédération Aéronautique Internationale microlight rules. It features a strut-braced biplane layout, a two-seats-in-tandem open cockpit, fixed conventional landing gear and a single engine in tractor configuration. The aircraft closely resembles the 1930s Bücker Bü 131.

The aircraft is made from Polish pine, with its flying surfaces covered in doped aircraft fabric. Its 7.55 m (24.8 ft) span wing employs ailerons on the lower wing only. The aircraft can use engines from 50 to 85 hp (37 to 63 kW). The 80 hp (60 kW) Rotax 912UL, the 85 hp (63 kW) Jabiru 2200 and the 75 hp (56 kW) Limbach L2000 Volkswagen air-cooled engine have been fitted, along with automotive conversions such as the Nissan 1.2 litre engine.

== Specifications (Vagabund) ==
Data from Bayerl and Aerocrafter

General characteristics

- Crew: one
- Capacity: one passenger
- Wingspan: 7.55 m (24 ft 9 in)
- Wing area: 18.2 m^{2} (196 sq ft)
- Empty weight: 114 kg (252 lb)
- Gross weight: 450 kg (992 lb)
- Fuel capacity: 50 litres (11 imp gal; 13 US gal)
- Powerplant: 1 × Jabiru 2200 four cylinder, air-cooled, four stroke aircraft engine, 63 kW (85 hp)
- Propellers: 2-bladed wooden

Performance

- Maximum speed: 140 km/h (87 mph, 76 kn)
- Cruise speed: 115 km/h (71 mph, 62 kn)
- Stall speed: 59 km/h (37 mph, 32 kn)
- Range: 400 km (250 mi, 220 nmi)
- Rate of climb: 3 m/s (590 ft/min)
- Wing loading: 24.73 kg/m^{2} (5.07 lb/sq ft)
