= Valentin Taifun =

German motor glider, 1981

Taifun
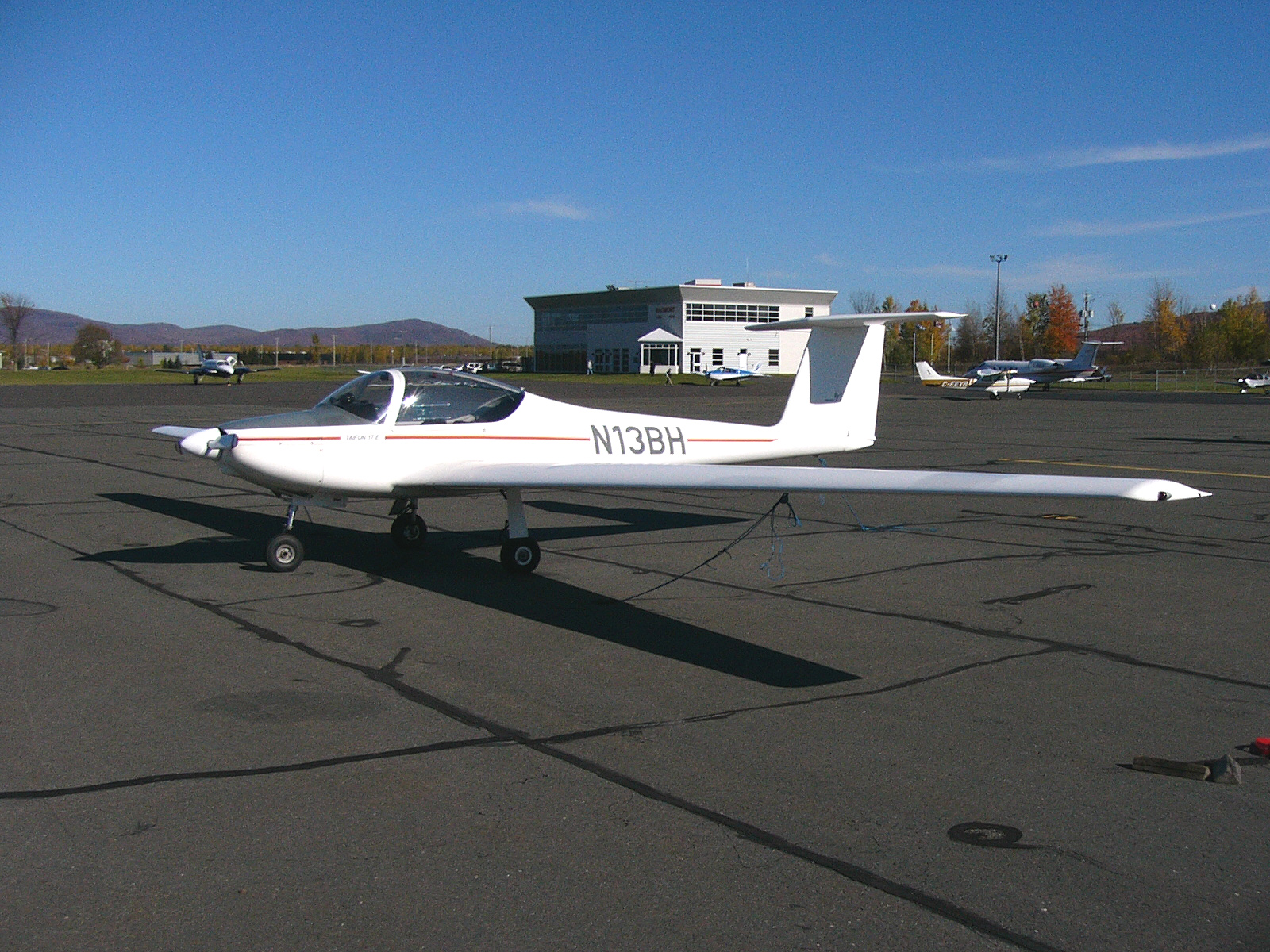
- Valentin Taifun 17E

General information
- Type: Motor glider
- National origin: Germany
- Manufacturer: Valentin Flugzeugbau
- Status: Production completed
- Number built: 136

History
- Introduction date: 1981
- First flight: 28 February 1981

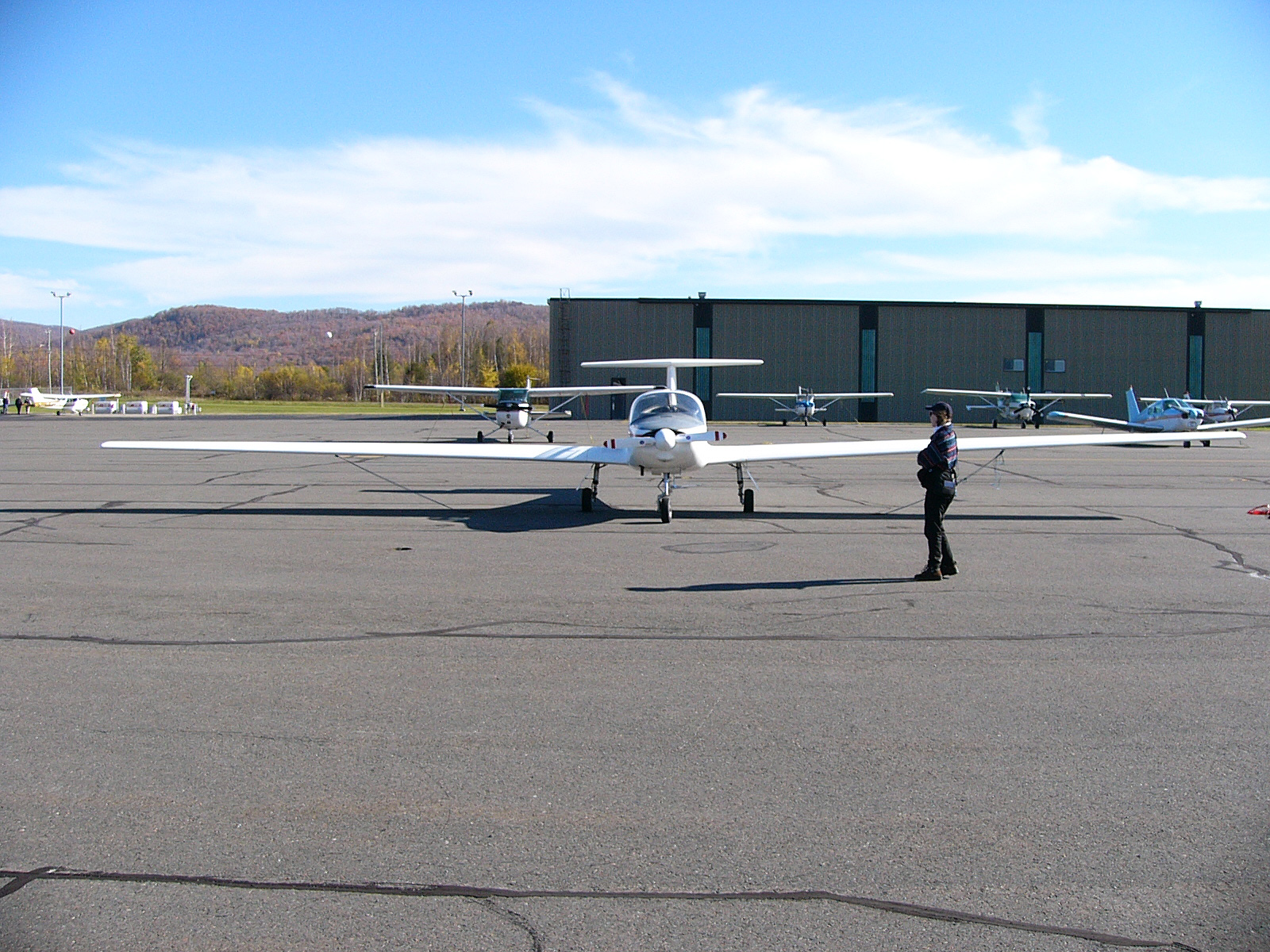
Valentin Taifun 17E, showing its 17-metre (55 foot) wingspan

The Valentin Taifun is a two-seat self-launching sailplane designed and built by Valentin Flugzeugbau GmbH of Hasfurt, Germany.

== Design and development ==
The Taifun is an all glass-fibre low-wing cantilever monoplane with a T-tail and side-by-side seating for two occupants. It has a manually operated retractable tricycle landing gear. The Taifun is powered originally by an 80 hp (60 kW) Limbach L2000EB (Volkswagen) engine with later production aircraft being fitted with 90 hp (67 kW) Limbach L2400EB engine. The wings fold back along the fuselage sides for transportation and storage. The prototype, registered D-KONO, first flew on the 28 February 1981. The main production aircraft had a 17-metre wingspan and was designated the Taifun 17E. Two examples of aircraft with a 12-metre wingspan were built as the Taifun 12E which were classed as light-aircraft rather than a motor glider. An improved four-seat Taifun 11S was studied with a 115 hp (86 kW) Lycoming O-235 engine and fixed landing gear but the design was abandoned.

== Variants ==
Taifun 17E
Main production variant with a 17 metre wingspan and a Limbach flat-four engine.
Taifun 17E II
Later production variant with a 17 metre wingspan and a Limbach flat-four engine or can be retrofitted with a Rotax 914, hydraulically operated landing gear, double panel Schempp-Hirth type airbrakes on the upper wing surface. a.k.a. WI Taifun 17 EII
Taifun 12E
Variant with a 12 metre wingspan, two built.
Taifun 11S
Planned variant with four-seats, not built.

== Aircraft on display ==
- Deutsches Museum Flugwerft Schleissheim, near Munich, Germany.

== Specifications (17E) ==
Data from Jane's All the World's Aircraft 1985–86, Jane's All the World's Aircraft 1988-89

General characteristics

- Crew: 2
- Length: 7.782 m (25 ft 6 in)
- Wingspan: 17 m (55 ft 9 in)
- Height: 2.48 m (8 ft 2 in)
- Wing area: 17.6 m^{2} (189 sq ft)
- Aspect ratio: 16.4
- Airfoil: Wortmann FX-67-K-170/17
- Empty weight: 610 kg (1,345 lb)
- Max takeoff weight: 850 kg (1,874 lb)
- Fuel capacity: 90 L (24 US gal; 20 imp gal)
- Powerplant: 1 × Limbach L.2000EB 4-cyl. air-cooled horizontally-opposed piston engine, 60 kW (80 hp)
- Propellers: 2-bladed Mühlbauer MTV-1-A variable-pitch feathering propeller, 1.6 m (5 ft 3 in) diameter

Performance

- Cruise speed: 220 km/h (140 mph, 120 kn) max
- Stall speed: 72 km/h (45 mph, 39 kn) un-powered
- Never exceed speed: 250 km/h (160 mph, 130 kn) in smooth air

185 km/h (100 kn; 115 mph) in rough air

- Range: 1,250 km (780 mi, 670 nmi) with maximum fuel
- Service ceiling: 5,000 m (16,000 ft)
- g limits: +5.3 -2.65
- Maximum glide ratio: 30 at 105 km/h (57 kn; 65 mph)
- Rate of climb: 3.2 m/s (630 ft/min) max at Sea level
- Rate of sink: 0.95 m/s (187 ft/min) at 75 km/h (40 kn; 47 mph)
- Wing loading: 48.3 kg/m^{2} (9.9 lb/sq ft)
- Power/mass: 12.67 kg/kW (20.82 lb/hp)

== See also ==
Aircraft of comparable role, configuration, and era

- Diamond HK36 Super Dimona
- Grob G 109
