= Limbach L2000 =

German aircraft engine

- Type: Piston aircraft engine
- National origin: Germany
- Manufacturer: Limbach Flugmotoren
- First run: c. 1980
- Major applications: Scheibe SF 36

The Limbach L2000 is a series of German piston aero-engines designed and built by Limbach Flugmotoren. They are four-cylinder, four-stroke, air-cooled horizontally opposed, piston engines with a power output of 75 to 80 hp (56 to 60 kW).

== Variants ==
L2000 DA
Certified in 1989 as a double-ignition tractor engine with carburettor in the back, top location, alternator in the front, starter in the front. 75 hp (56 kW)
L2000 EO
Certified in 1980 as a single-ignition tractor engine with carburettor in the back, bottom location, alternator in the back, starter in the back. 80 hp (60 kW)
L2000 EA
Certified in 1980 as a single-ignition tractor engine with carburettor in the back, top location, alternator in the front, starter in the front. 80 hp (60 kW)
L2000 EB
Certified in 1980 as a single-ignition tractor engine with two carburettors in the back, bottom location, alternator in the back, starter in the back. 80 hp (60 kW)
L2000 EC
Certified in 1980 as a single-ignition pusher engine with carburettor in the back, bottom location, alternator in the back, starter in the back. 80 hp (60 kW)

== Applications ==
- Aeromot AMT-100 Ximango
- AV Leichtflugzeuge Vagabund
- Grob G 109
- Hoffmann HK 36 Super Dimona
- ICA IS-28
- JPM 01 Médoc
- Lucas L-6A
- Politechnika Warszawska PW-4 Pelikan
- Scheibe SF 36A (EA)
- Tri-R KIS TR-1
- Valentin Taifun
- Weller UW-9 Sprint
- Whisper Aircraft Whisper

== Specifications (L 2000 E0) ==
Data from L 2000 series data sheet

=== General characteristics ===
- Type: Four-cylinder, four-stroke air-cooled flat piston engine
- Bore: 90 mm
- Stroke: 78.4 mm
- Displacement: 1.994 cm³
- Length: 627 mm
- Width: 775 mm
- Height: 415 mm
- Dry weight: 70 kg

=== Components ===
- Fuel type: Mogas and 100LL Octane petrol
- Cooling system: Air-cooled

=== Performance ===
- Power output: 53 kW at 3,000 rpm (max continuous)
- Compression ratio: 8:5 - 8:9:1

== See also ==
Related lists

- Limbach Flugmotoren
- List of aircraft engines
