= Diamond HK36 Super Dimona =

Austrian motor glider, 1989

H36 Dimona and HK36 Super Dimona
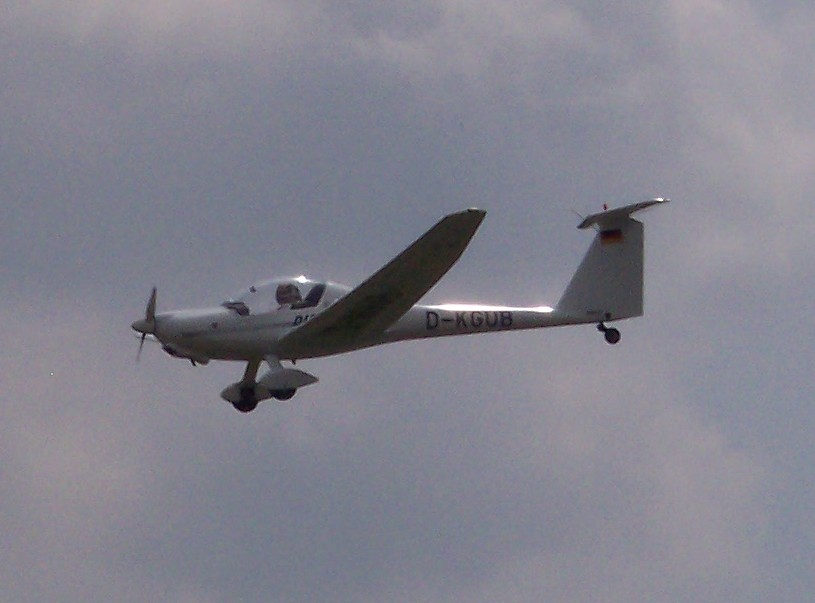
- Diamond HK36 Super Dimona

General information
- Type: Motor glider
- National origin: Austria
- Manufacturer: Diamond Aircraft Industries
- Designer: Wolf Hoffmann
- Status: In production (HK36 Super Dimona)
- Number built: more than 900

History
- Manufactured: 1980–present
- First flight: 9 October 1980 (H36); October 1989 (HK36R)
- Variant: Diamond DV20

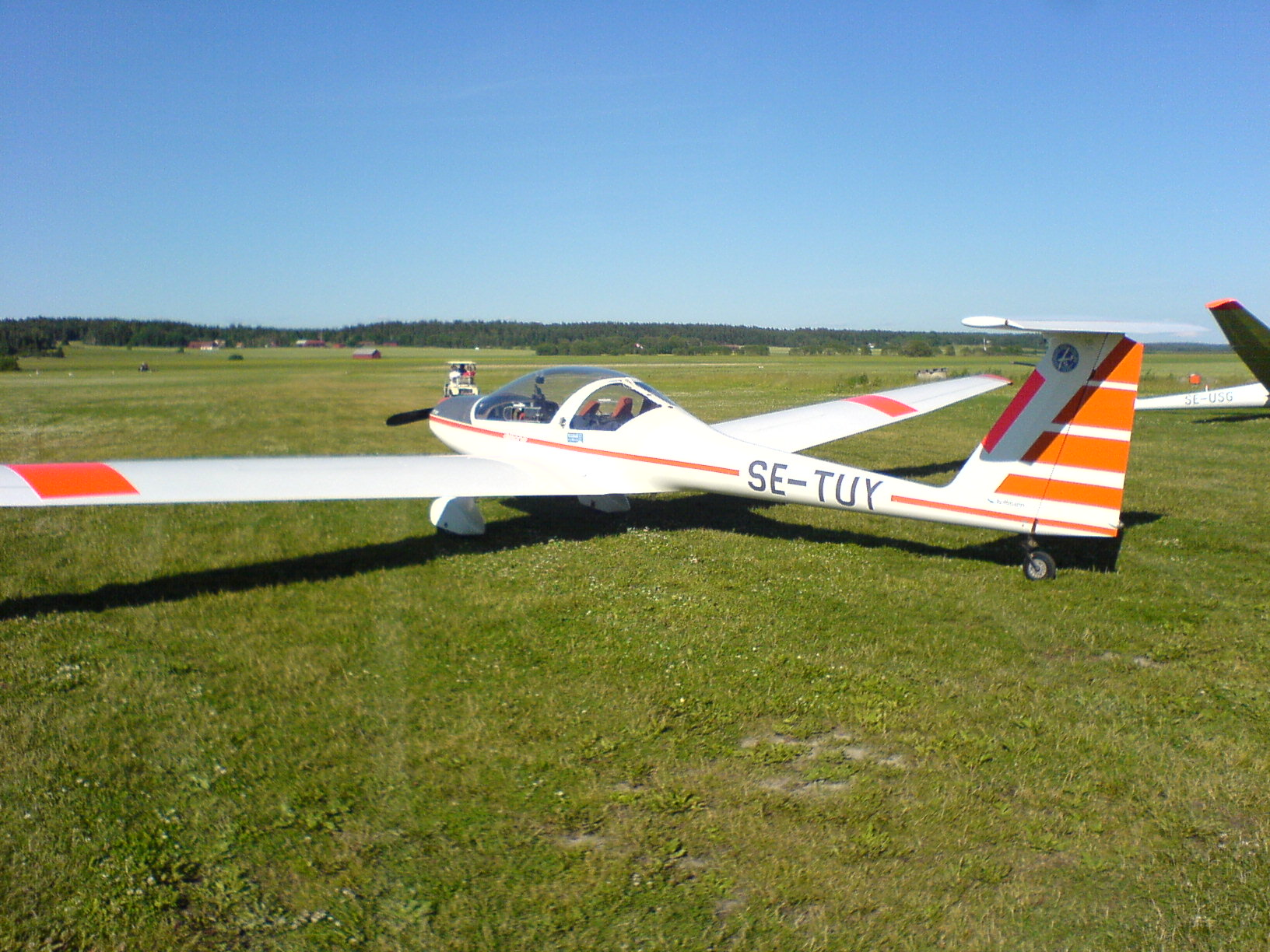
Hoffmann H36 Dimona

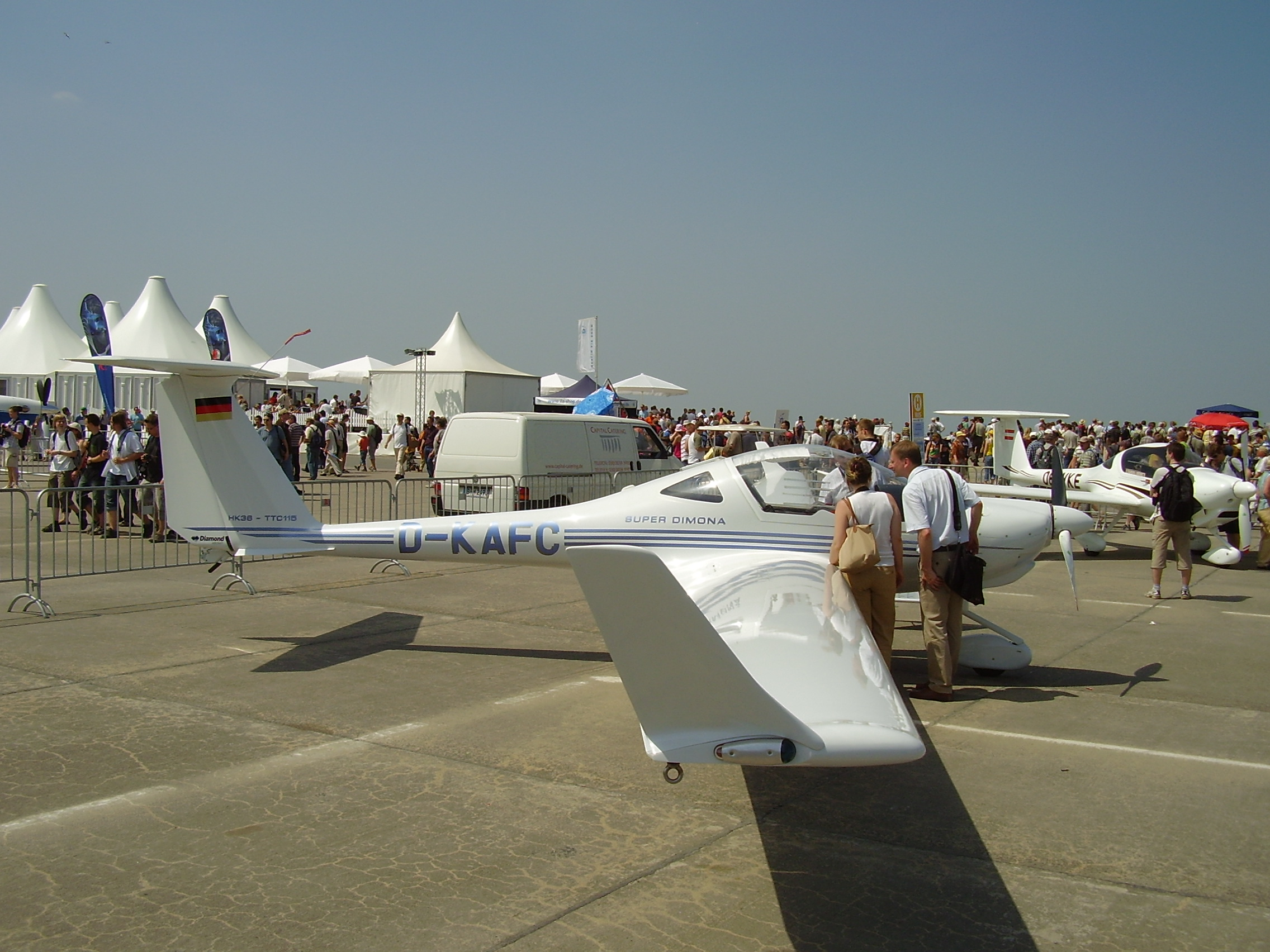
Super Dimona, showing its winglets

The Diamond HK36 Super Dimona is an extensive family of Austrian low-wing, T-tailed, two-seat motor gliders that were designed by Wolf Hoffmann and currently produced by Diamond Aircraft Industries.

== Design and development ==
The series started with the Hoffmann H36 Dimona, a touring motorglider introduced in the early 1980s. The aircraft were initially produced by Hoffmann Flugzeugbau, which became HOAC Flugzeugwerk and later Diamond Aircraft Industries.

Built entirely from fibreglass, the H36 family all use a Wortmann FX 63-137 airfoil. The wings feature top-surface Schempp-Hirth-style airbrakes. Optionally, the wings can be folded by two people in a few minutes to allow storage. The original H36 has 16.0 m (52.5 ft) wings, while the later members of the family added slightly greater span. The H36 offers a 27:1 glide ratio, while later variants improved that by one point, to 28:1 by adding winglets increasing the span to 16.33 m (53.6 ft). Cockpit accommodation seats two in side-by-side configuration, under a hinged bubble canopy that is pushed up and backwards.

The series are type certified in Europe and North America. The H36 received its US Federal Aviation Administration certification on 9 July 1986. Due to its fibreglass construction, the US certification includes the restriction "All external portions of the glider exposed to sunlight must be painted white except of (sic) wing tips, nose of fuselage and rudder."

In March 1987 an improved variant was developed by Dieter Köhler and the subsequent HK36R first flew with a Limbach L2400 engine in October 1989.

When equipped with the larger available engines, particularly the 86 kW (115 hp) Rotax 914 turbocharged powerplant, the aircraft can be used for glider towing. A commercial success, more than 900 H36s and HK36s have been completed.

The HK36 provided the basis from which the Diamond DV20 Katana from which the improved DA20 and four-seat DA40 series were later developed.

== Operational history ==
In 1991, an HK36, flown by Peter Urach in Austria, set an absolute altitude record in its class for a piston engined aircraft of 36,188 ft (11,030 m). The record held until surpassed in 2002 by the Bohannon B-1.

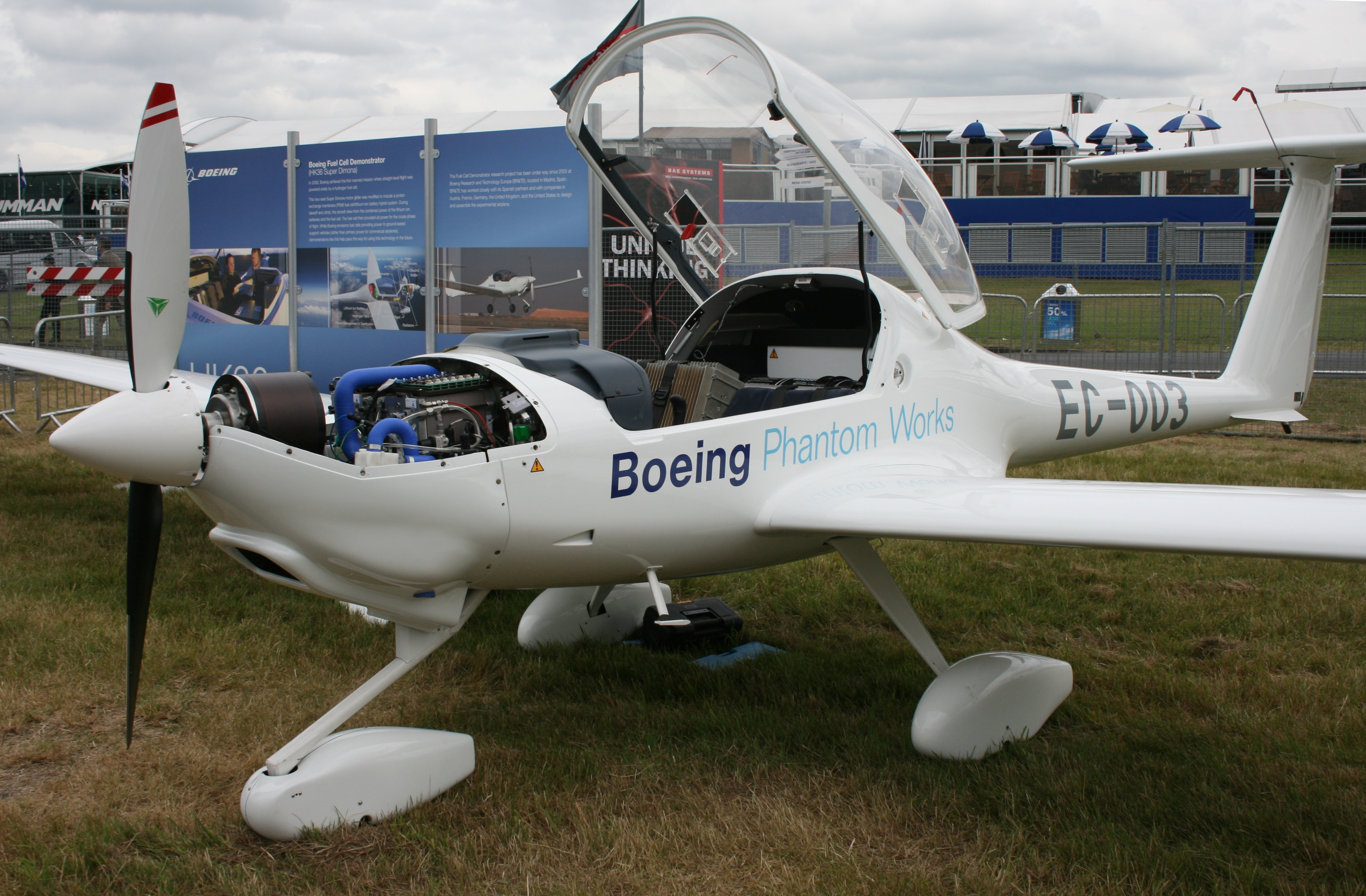
In February 2008, The Boeing Fuel Cell Demonstrator used a Diamond HK36 Super Dimona motor glider airframe and achieved straight-level flight on a manned mission powered by a hydrogen fuel cell.

The FCD (Fuel Cell Demonstrator) was a project led by Boeing that used a Diamond HK36 Super Dimona motor glider as a testbed for a fuel cell-powered light airplane research project. The project achieved level flight using fuel cells only in February and March 2008.

In December 2016 there were nine H36s and thirty HK36s registered with the US FAA, two HK36Rs and two HK36TTSs registered with Transport Canada, along with seven H36s and eight HK36s registered with the UK Civil Aviation Authority.

== Variants ==
H36 Dimona
Original version produced by Hoffmann and later by HOAC, with a 16.0 m (52.5 ft) wingspan, conventional landing gear, 27:1 glide ratio and powered by a Limbach L2000 EB1C engine of 60 kW (80 hp), a Rotax 912A of 60 kW (80 hp) or Limbach L2400 EB of 65 kW (87 hp). Applied for US FAA certificate on 4 April 1982 and received on 9 July 1986 in the utility category at a gross weight of 770 kg (1,698 lb).

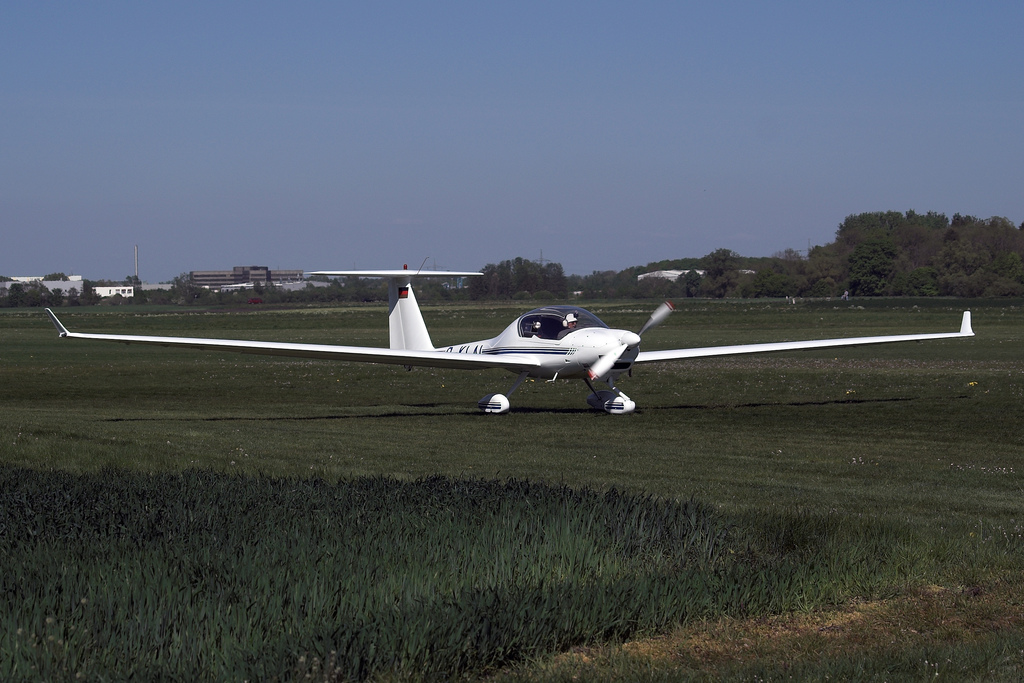
Super Dimona, showing its wingspan

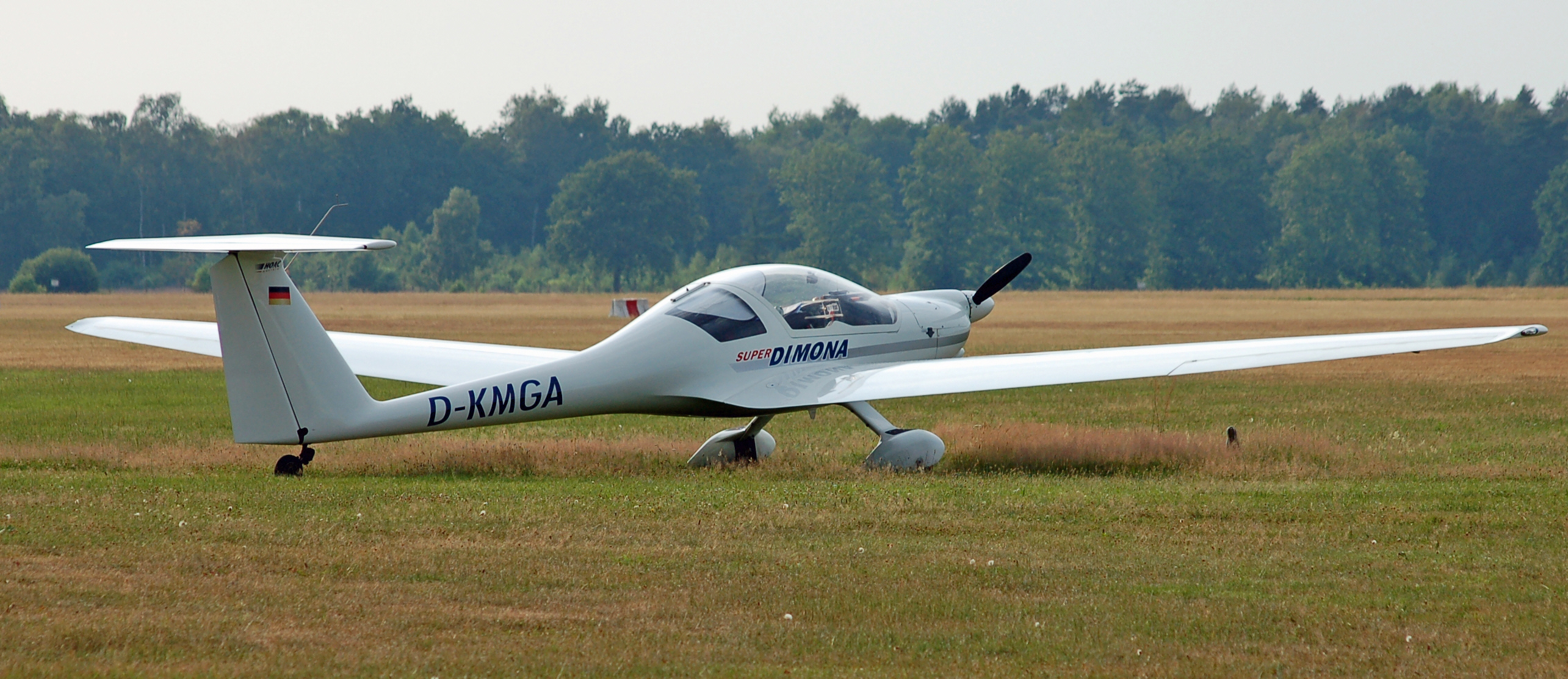
Hoffmann HK-36 R Super Dimona

HK36 R Super Dimona
Developed from the H36, with a carbon-fibre spar, modified fuselage, 16.2 m (53.1 ft) wingspan and 60 kW (80 hp) Rotax 912A engine. Optional wing tips can extend the span to 17.6 m (57.7 ft). Received US FAA type approval on 23 July 1993 in the utility category at a gross weight of 770 kg (1,698 lb).
HK36TS Super Dimona
Developed from the HK36 R Super Dimona, the HK36TS has a 60 kW (80 hp) Rotax 912 A3 engine, 16.6 m (54.5 ft) wingspan, 28:1 glide ratio and conventional landing gear. Received US FAA type approval on 25 September 1997 in the utility category at a gross weight of 770 kg (1,698 lb). Marketed as the Katana Xtreme in Canada and the USA.
HK36TC Super Dimona
The HK36TC has a 60 kW (80 hp) Rotax 912 A3 engine. Received US FAA type approval on 25 September 1997 in the utility category at a gross weight of 770 kg (1,698 lb). Marketed as the Katana Xtreme in Canada and the USA.

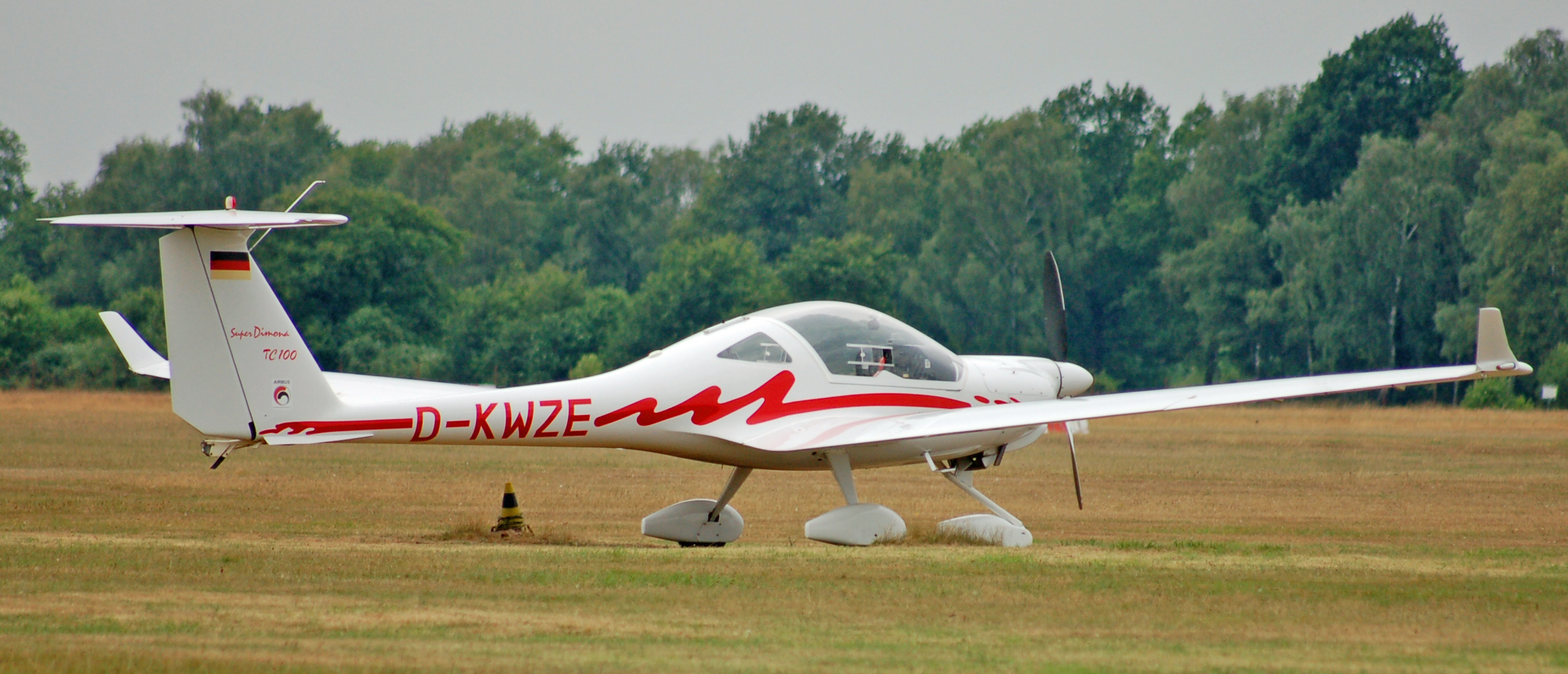
Diamond HK36TC-100 Super Dimona

HK36TC-100 Super Dimona
The HK36TC-100 has a 74 kW (99 hp) Rotax 912 S3 engine. Applied for US FAA type approval on 16 January 2003 and received on 12 January 2004 in the utility category at a gross weight of 770 kg (1,698 lb). Minimum sink rate: 1.18 m/s at 97 km/h, glide ratio 1:27 at 105 km/h Marketed as the Katana Xtreme in Canada and the USA.
HK36TTS Super Dimona
The HK36TTS has an 86 kW (115 hp) Rotax 914 F3 or F4 turbocharged engine, a Muhlbauer MTV-21-A-C-F/CF 175-05 propeller, 16.6 m (54.5 ft) wingspan, 28:1 glide ratio, and conventional landing gear. Received US FAA type approval on 25 September 1997 in the utility category at a gross weight of 770 kg (1,698 lb). Marketed as the Katana Xtreme in Canada and the USA.

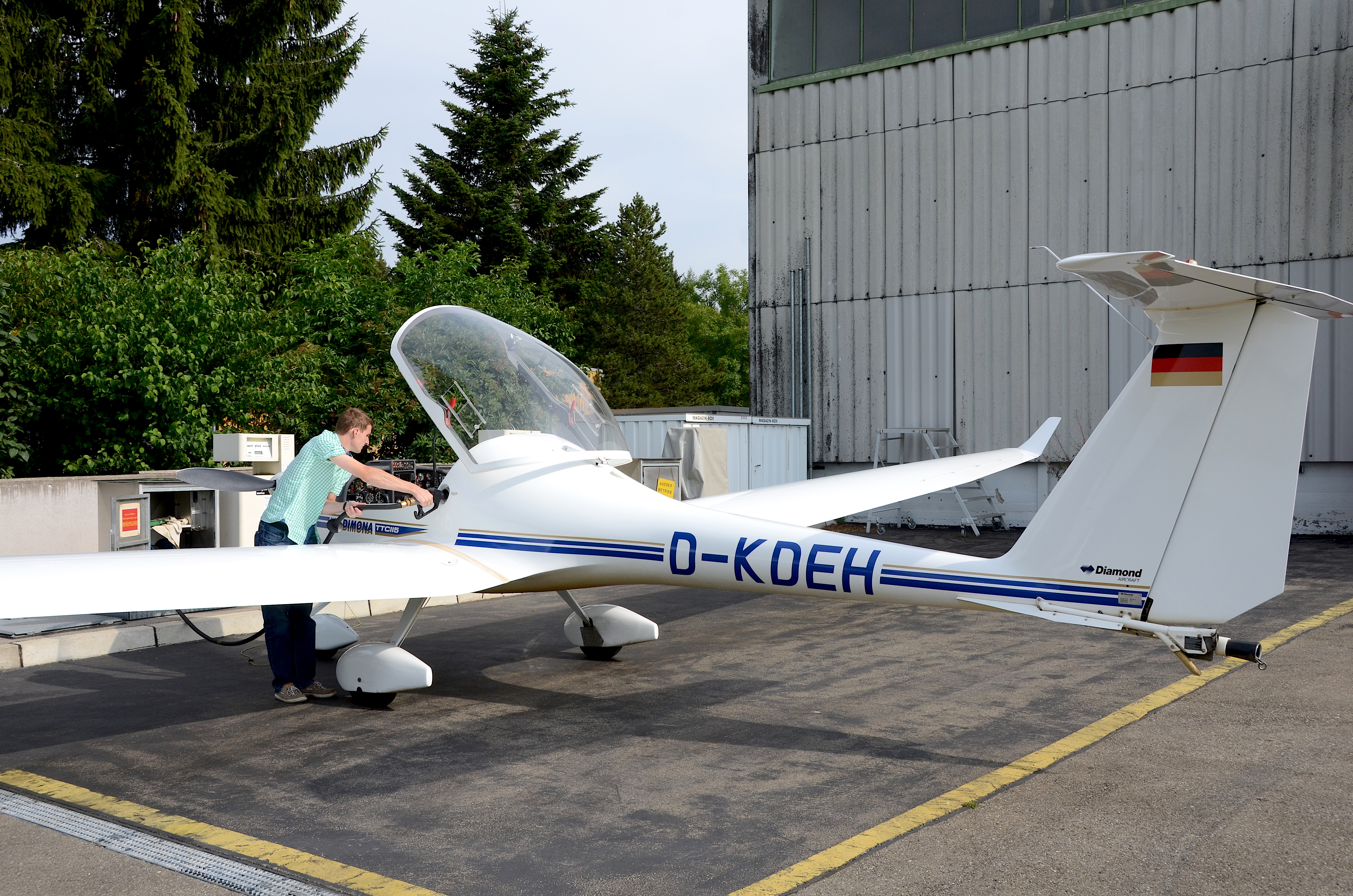
Refueling a HK36-TTC Super Dimona

HK36TTC Super Dimona
The HK36TTC has an 86 kW (115 hp) Rotax 914 F3 or F4 turbocharged engine, 16.6 m (54.5 ft) wingspan, 28:1 glide ratio, and tricycle landing gear. Received US FAA type approval on 25 September 1997 in the utility category at a gross weight of 770 kg (1,698 lb). Marketed as the Katana Xtreme in Canada and the USA.
HK36TTC Eco Dimona
Special mission version of the HK36 for the surveillance role, it is equipped with a gimbal-mounted Wescam camera and cockpit display, an 86 kW (115 hp) Rotax 914 F3 or F4 turbocharged engine and a Muhlbauer MTV-21-A-C-F/CF 175-05 propeller. Received US FAA type approval on 29 March 1999 in the utility category at a gross weight of 770 kg (1,698 lb) and 21 December 2000 in the restricted category, limited to aerial photography only, at a gross weight of 930 kg (2,050 lb). Marketed as the Multi Purpose Xtreme in Canada.
Diamond DA36 E-Star
Developed by Siemens, EADS and Diamond Aircraft to reduce fuel consumption and emissions by up to 25 percent, using a serial hybrid drive that turns the aircraft's prop with a Siemens 70 kW (94 hp) electric motor, from power generated by a 40 hp (30 kW) Austro Engines Wankel rotary engine and generator, stored in batteries. The prototype first flew 8 June 2011.
Hoffmann H38 Observer
A surveillance aircraft largely based on the H36 Dimona which failed to enter flight testing due to failure of the partnership between Wolf Hoffmann and Hoffmann Flugzeugbau.
B.R.1
(Thai: บ.ร.๑) Royal Thai Armed Forces designation for the H36.

== Operators ==
India

- Indian Air Force

== Specifications (Hoffmann H36 Dimona) ==
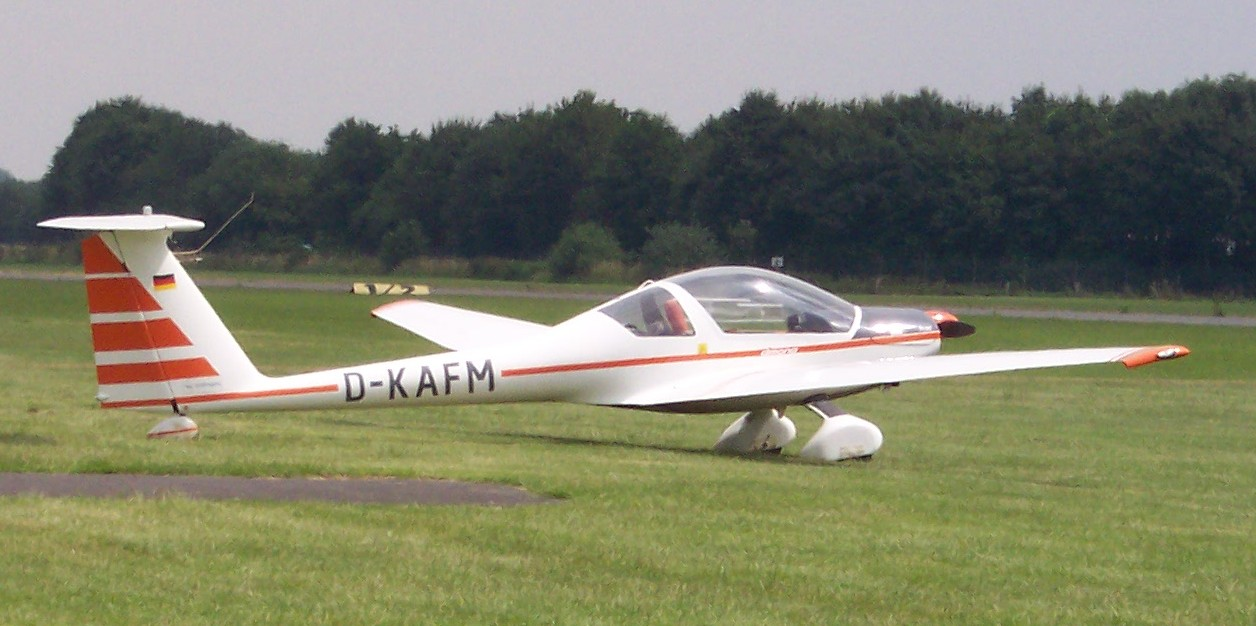
Hoffmann H36 Dimona

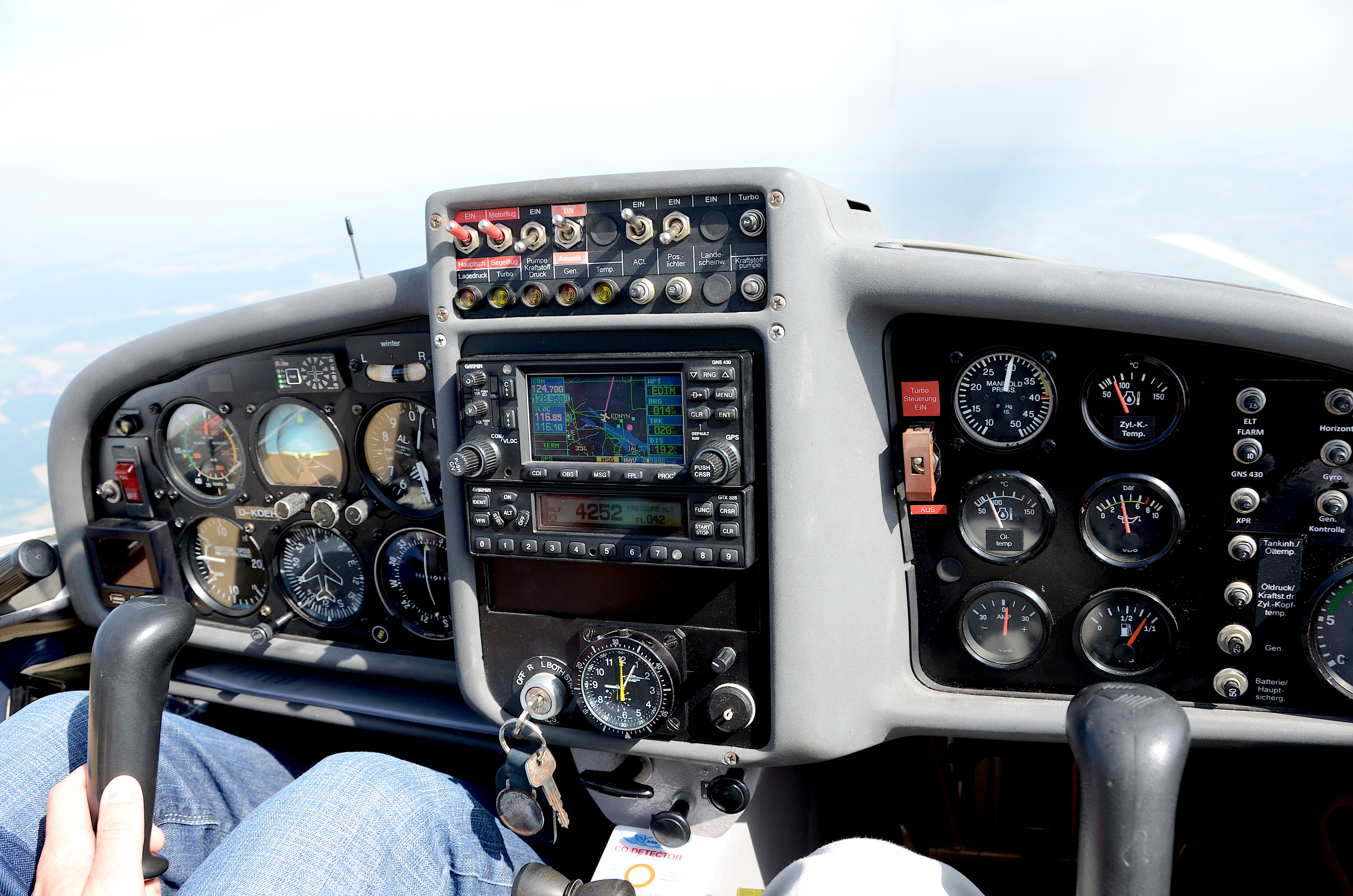
Cockpit of Super Dimona HK36-TTC

Data from Sailplane Directory, Soaring and FAA Type Certificate G51EU

General characteristics

- Crew: one
- Capacity: one passenger
- Wingspan: 16.0 m (52 ft 6 in)
- Wing area: 15.24 m^{2} (164.0 sq ft)
- Aspect ratio: 16.8:1
- Airfoil: Wortmann FX 63-137
- Empty weight: 497 kg (1,096 lb)
- Gross weight: 770 kg (1,698 lb)
- Fuel capacity: 80 liters (18 imp gal; 21 U.S. gal)
- Propellers: 2-bladed Hoffmann HO-V 62-R/L 160 T, three position, fully feathering

Performance

- Cruise speed: 182 km/h (113 mph, 98 kn)
- Never exceed speed: 275 km/h (171 mph, 148 kn) sea level to 6000 feet
- Range: 1,090 km (680 mi, 590 nmi)
- Maximum glide ratio: 27:1 at 105 km/h (65 mph)
- Rate of sink: 0.91 m/s (179 ft/min) at 79 km/h (49 mph)
- Wing loading: 48.56 kg/m^{2} (9.95 lb/sq ft)

== See also ==
- List of gliders

Related development

- Diamond DV20

Aircraft of comparable role, configuration, and era

- Grob G 109
- Pipistrel Sinus
- Schweizer SGM 2-37
- Valentin Taifun
