= Hoffmann H40 =

H40
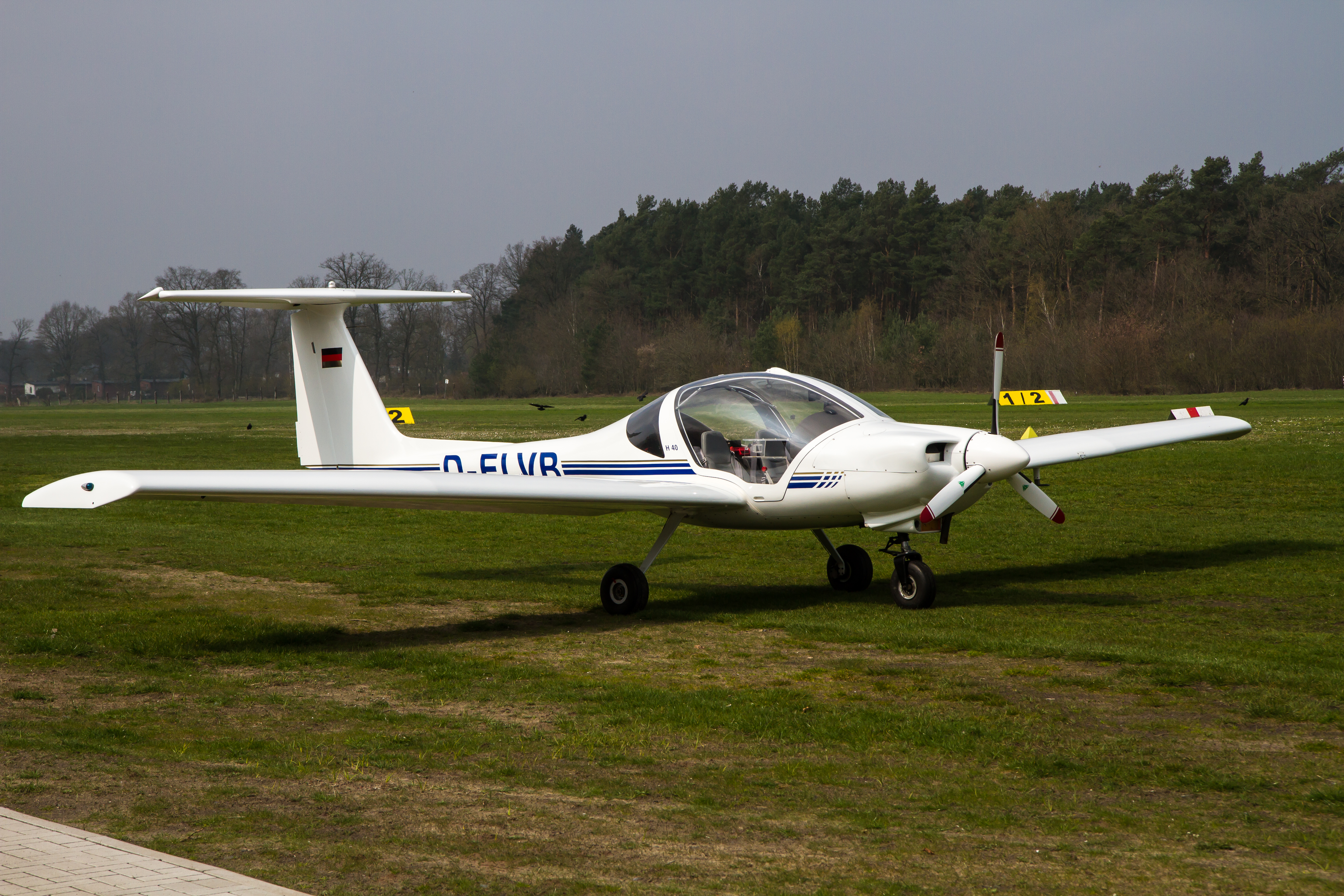

General information
- Type: Sport aircraft
- National origin: Germany
- Manufacturer: Hoffmann
- Designer: Wolf Hoffmann
- Number built: 1

History
- First flight: 28 August 1988

The Hoffmann H40 was a prototype sport aircraft built in Germany in 1988. Designed by Wolf Hoffmann based on his Dimona motor-glider, it was a conventional, low-wing monoplane with side-by-side seating for two and tricycle undercarriage. The aircraft's high aspect ratio wings and T-tail were carried over from its motorglider heritage, but the span was shorter than that of the Dimona. Construction throughout was of composite materials. Hoffmann intended this aircraft to compete with sporting two-seaters such as the Grob G 115 and Robin ATL, but was unable to find the financial backing to bring the aircraft to market, despite a 30% share bought in the project by German pump manufacturer ABS.

== Specifications ==
Data from Jane's All The World's Aircraft 1988-89

General characteristics

- Crew: One pilot
- Capacity: 1 passenger
- Length: 7.26 m (24 ft 11.75 in)
- Wingspan: 10.76 m (35 ft 3.5 in)
- Height: 2.39 m (7 ft 10 in)
- Wing area: 13.62 m^{2} (145.3 sq ft)
- Empty weight: 590 kg (1,300 lb)
- Gross weight: 850 kg (1,874 lb)
- Powerplant: 1 × Lycoming O-235 flat-four , 86.5 kW (116 hp)

Performance

- Maximum speed: 210 km/h (130 mph, 110 kn)
- Cruise speed: 180 km/h (111 mph, 96 kn)
- Range: 680 km (422 mi, 367 nmi)
- Service ceiling: 4,500 m (14,800 ft)
- Rate of climb: 3.6 m/s (700 ft/min)
