= Grob G 109 =

German motor glider family by Grob, 1980

Grob G 109 / Vigilant T1
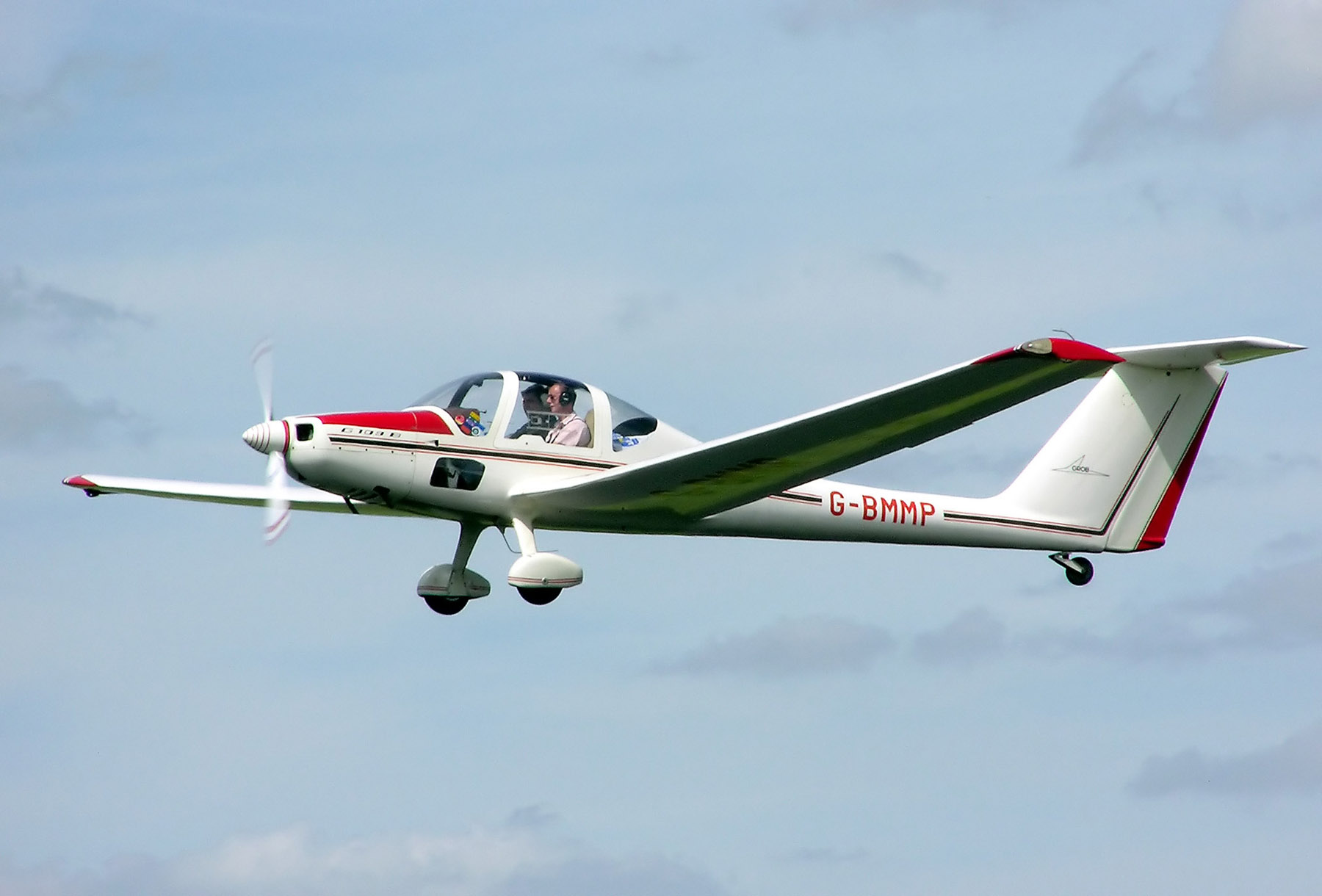
- A British civilian-registered G 109B.

General information
- Type: motor glider
- Manufacturer: Grob Aircraft AG
- Designer: Burkhart Grob
- Primary user: Royal Air Force (historical); Australian Air Force Cadets
- Number built: 476

History
- First flight: 14 March 1980; 46 years ago

The Grob G 109 is a light general aviation aircraft developed by Grob Aircraft AG of Mindelheim Mattsies in Germany. It first flew (G 109 prototype, and then production G 109A form) in 1980. The G 109B followed in 1984. It is a two-seat self-launching motor glider, in which the pilot and passenger or student sit side by side, with good visibility provided by large windows.

As well as conventional civilian use, the G 109B variant was also used in military service by the Volunteer Gliding Squadrons (VGS) of the Royal Air Force (RAF) to train air cadets through the gliding induction, and gliding scholarship courses up until 5 May 2018, when it was retired from RAF service. The Grob G 109B was known in RAF service as the Vigilant T1. The Grob G 109 was the first motor glider built using glass-reinforced plastic composite construction to be granted Federal Aviation Administration approval.

== Design and development ==
=== Technical description (G 109B / Vigilant T1) ===
The G 109B was developed after series production of the G 109A, which itself followed a number of early prototypes with differing wingspans, configurations etc. The G 109B addressed several issues learnt from operation of the earlier G 109A, which included improvements to power; (71 kilowatts (97 metric horsepower; 95 brake horsepower) up from 60 kilowatts (82 metric horsepower; 80 brake horsepower) on the G 109A, performance of the wings when wet, crosswind behaviour, and limits and cockpit space.

The G 109B aircraft is a low-wing cantilever motor glider, with a T-tail, folding (and detachable) wings, and side-by-side seating with dual controls. It is mainly constructed from glass-reinforced plastic, and has a taildragger undercarriage arrangement. Entry and exit from the cockpit is via two acrylic glass doors which open upwards individually; a modification from the original one-piece G 109A canopy. The cockpit can be heated, providing that the engine is running, and the seat backs can be adjusted and cushions of differing thickness inserted to accommodate a range of body sizes.

Total weight is around 850 kilograms (1,874 pounds), with a maximum load of 230 kilograms (507 pounds), though this depends on mod state and history of the airframe, and is rarely above 200 kilograms (441 pounds) on most examples. The Royal Air Force (RAF) sought and obtained a number of military-specific modifications; including a dispensation from Grob for operating the military variant aircraft to a Max AUW of 908 kilograms (2,002 pounds) providing an extra 59 kilograms (130 pounds) of useful load. The aircraft was not modified to allow this, and no changes to the operating procedures were required, as the centre of gravity constraints were not exceeded. Grob have applied to EASA for permission to have an exception to the design standard (CS22) for the Grob G 109B which would allow it to be certified to a similar 903 kg Max AUW, however, while the two objections received were rejected by EASA, the authority has not yet taken the necessary rulemaking action to allow this.

Cruising speed is in the region of 60 to 100 knots (110 to 190 kilometres per hour; 69 to 115 miles per hour) on the 71 kilowatts (97 PS; 95 bhp) engine, which can give the aircraft a top speed of 130 knots (240 kilometres per hour; 150 miles per hour). The engine (based on a Porsche air-cooled car unit) can be shut down in flight, with its propeller blades feathered. The aircraft then becomes a pure glider, with a best glide ratio of around 1:28. The Porsche-derived horizontally opposed air-cooled engine had its cylinder bore increased by Grob to make the engine 2.5 litres (153 cubic inches) displacement, and has had its Time Before Overhaul (TBO) increased by a technote to 1,600 hours after many examples run on condition reached up to or in excess of 4,000 hours in service.

Under the current United Kingdom Civil Aviation Authority (CAA) LASORS document, the G 109B can be classed as either a touring motor glider (TMG), or a self-launching motor glider (SLMG).

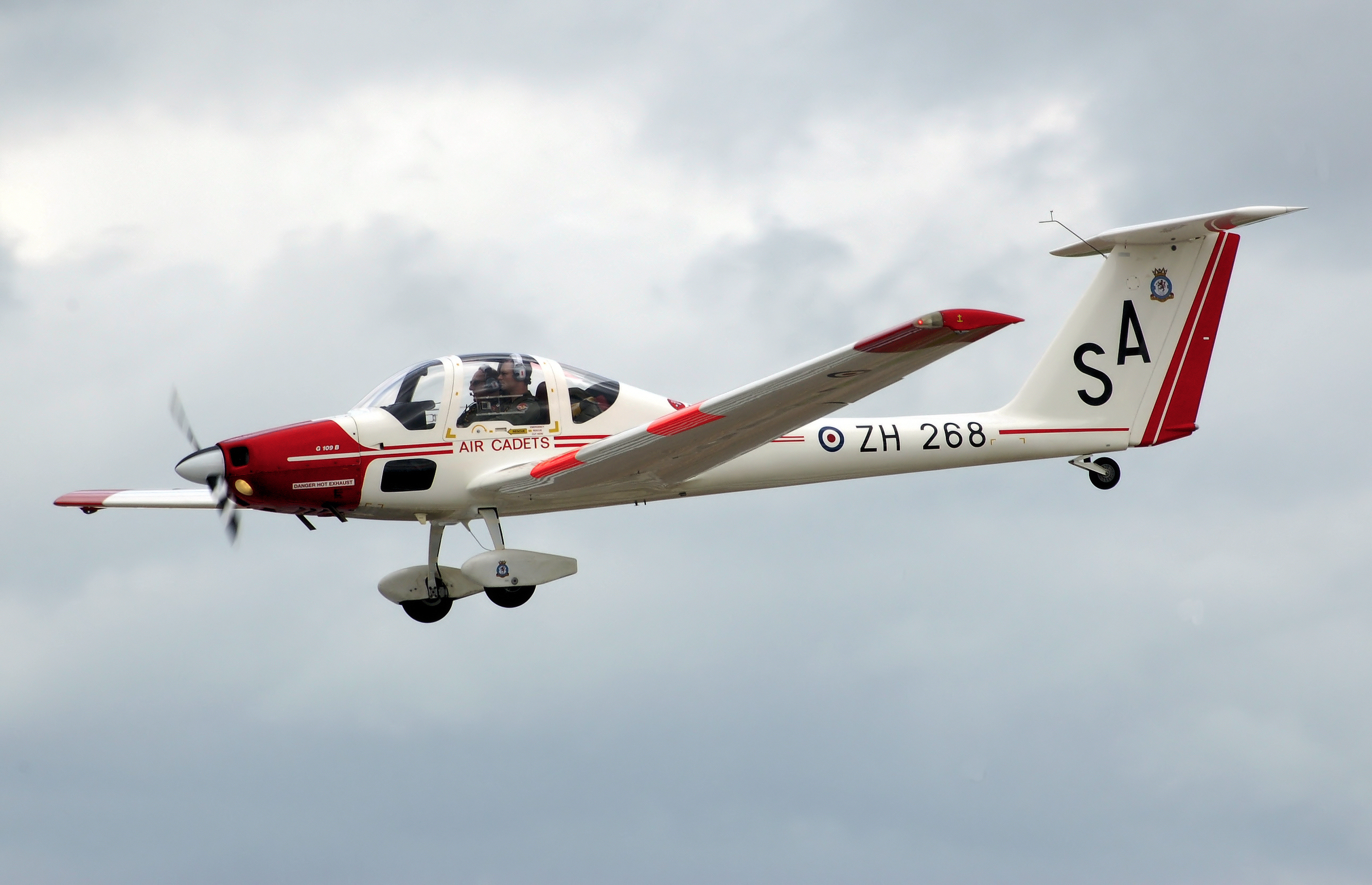
Royal Air Force Vigilant T1 lands at RIAT 2008, England.

=== Engine ===
The G 109B is powered by a Grob 2500 E1 horizontally opposed, four-cylinder, air-cooled petrol engine which develops approximately 71 kilowatts (97 metric horsepower; 95 brake horsepower) at 2,950 rpm. Its propeller is a two-bladed, manually operated variable-pitch type driven directly from the engine. Three pitch settings can be used: 'Fine' for take-off and general flying, 'Coarse' for cruising, and 'Feathered' for pure gliding with the engine off.

Carburettor heat can be supplied to the twin carburettors when there is a risk of icing. An electric fuel pump is used.

=== Controls ===
The G 109 uses conventional controls, duplicated for both seats, including the throttle (not available on the left in standard production G 109s). The rudder pedals, which also operate the wheel brakes, are adjustable forward and backward to suit individuals of differing leg length, and airbrakes are used to increase the rate of descent during the landing approach, as well as limiting airspeed to V_{ne} (velocity never exceed), if required.

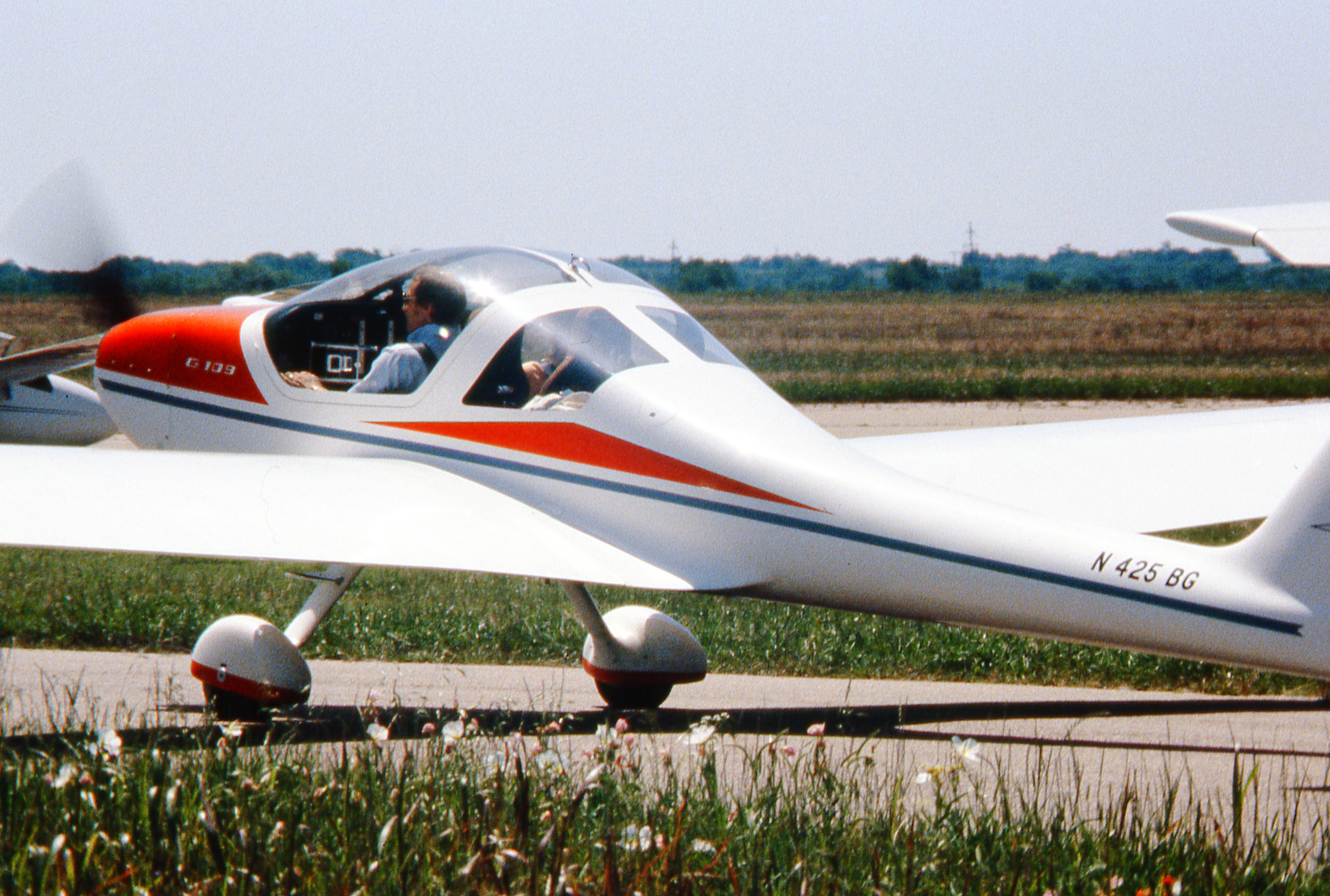
Grob G 109 (sn 6132, N425BG) rolling for takeoff; Texas, 1983.

== Operational history (Vigilant T1) ==
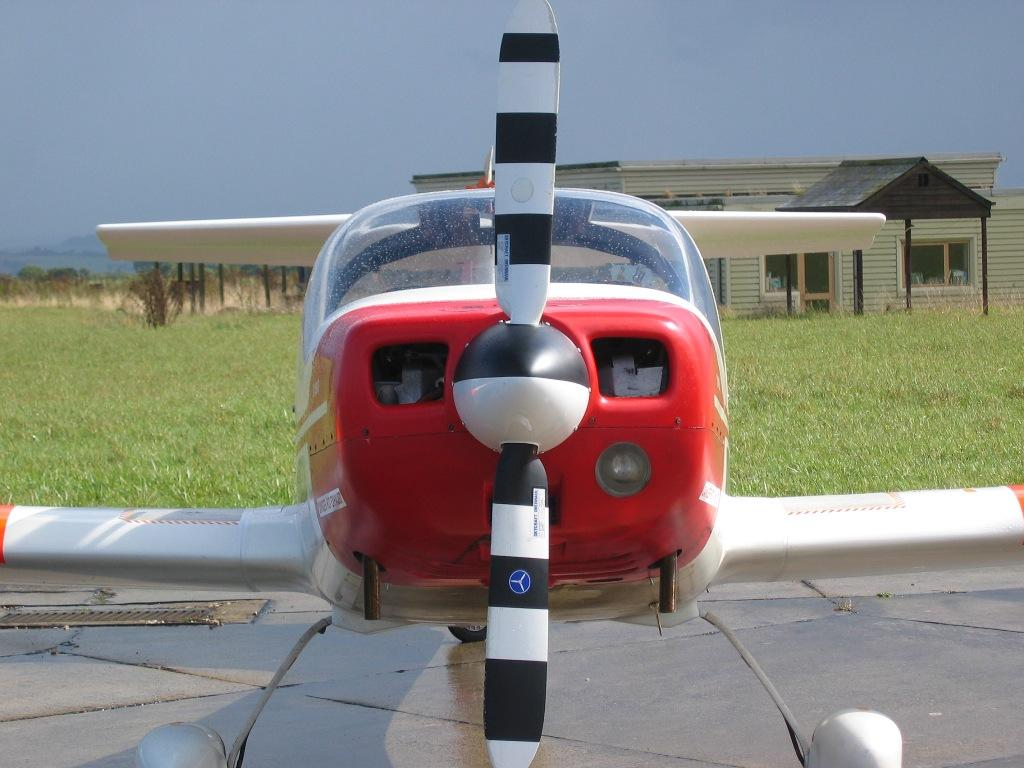
A Grob Vigilant T1 of 637 Volunteer Gliding Squadron.

The Vigilant T1 variant was introduced into Royal Air Force service in 1991, replacing the Slingsby Venture, and was used by Volunteer Gliding Squadrons (VGS) around the UK to train Air Training Corps and Combined Cadet Force cadets in basic flying, with the aim of bringing them to a standard where they are able to fly solo. The initial order for 53 was bolstered by additional aircraft purchased in the private market. The Vigilant was also used by the Royal Air Force Central Gliding School, at RAF Syerston in Nottinghamshire, which trains VGS instructors, as well as providing standards checking, syllabus development, and engineering support.

During the early 2000s, Australian Air Force Cadets adopted the Grob G 109 for pilot training purposes. The type is still in use to date.

The RAF Vigilant fleet was 'paused' from flying in April 2014, due to ongoing maintenance issues associated with poor maintenance (by its civilian contractor) and airworthiness certification. A recovery plan was put into in operation in 2016 which saw Vigilant numbers reduced to 15 nationwide, flown by four VGSs at 'regional hubs'. It was anticipated that these relaunched gliders would be disposed of in October 2019. This date was brought forward, and the Vigilant was retired from service on 5 May 2018. Two Vigilants were retained by the RAF; one as a ground based training aid, and the other as a gate guardian. The remainder of the fleet were transferred to the Defence Equipment Sales Authority, removed from the Military Aircraft Register, and sold to civilian operator Aerobility in 2020.

== Variants ==
G 109

The first two prototype aircraft (constructor's serial numbers 6001 and 6010) were designated G 109. They differed from later production aircraft by having a shorter wingspan of 15 metres (49 feet 3 inches). The first prototype, (registered D-KBGF), flew for the first time on 14 March 1980.

G 109A

The G 109A was fitted with a 2.0 litres (122 cubic inches), 60 kilowatts (82 metric horsepower; 80 brake horsepower) Limbach Flugmotoren flat four engine (maximum power delivered at 3,400 rpm), and the wing span was increased to 16.6 metres (54 feet 6 inches).

The engine power available was marginal in hot atmospheric conditions, or when flying through rain, so around 30 G 109A airframes were fitted with a 2.4 litres (146 cubic inches), 67 kilowatts (91 metric horsepower; 90 brake horsepower) Limbach engine and an electrically controlled variable-pitch propeller. At least two aircraft have been approved to use the Rotax 912 engine; see G 109Ar.

A total of 151 G 109A motor gliders were produced.

G 109Ar

The G 109Ar was a modification used on two Grob G 109A by the Aero Club Valkenburg of two aircraft with a Rotax boxer-type engine for increased performance on short runways and reliability. The nose of the aircraft is longer than that of the standard G 109A, the engine covers are shaped differently to house the engine and its air inlets, and improve airflow across the larger radiator. Three Grob G 109A's were converted on the G 109Ar. The Aero Club Valkenburg still has two of these, the ph-710 and ph-835.

G 109B

Developed out of the Grob G 109A; the wingspan was further increased to 17.4 metres (57 feet), the one-piece canopy of the earlier versions was replaced with two opening doors, and the main landing gear was moved rearwards to ease weight on the tail wheel. The engine was replaced with a Grob-built 2.5 litres (153 cubic inches) unit of 71 kilowatts (97 metric horsepower; 95 brake horsepower).

Some aircraft in Germany have been fitted with a turbocharged engine, and with structural strengthening of the fuselage, have been adapted to aero-tow gliders.

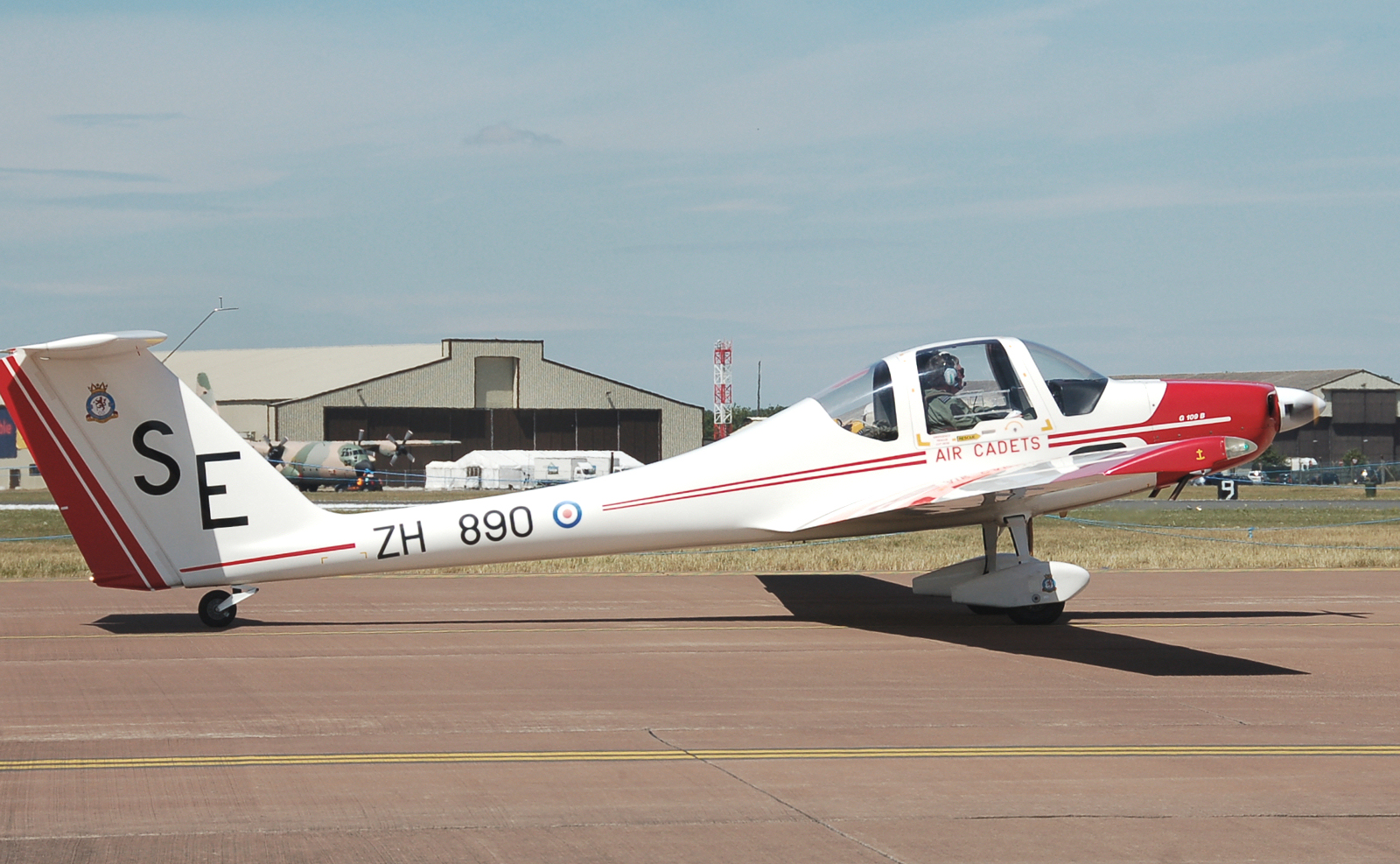
Grob G 109B Vigilant T1 of the RAF at RIAT 2010.

Ranger

Increased MTOW utility version with cameras in extended leading edge root fairings and provision for a ventral pannier for search and rescue equipment.

Vigilant T1

The Vigilant T1 is the military service name of the adapted Grob G 109B used by the Royal Air Force (RAF) for use by Volunteer Gliding Squadrons. VModifications to the Vigilant T1 include a landing light, a higher maximum all up mass (AUM) of 908 kilograms (2,002 pounds), and a throttle for use in the left-hand seat.

G 109 Able

The Vigilant T1 with Rotax 912is3 engine by charity Aerobility

B.R.2
(Thai: บ.ร.๒) Royal Thai Armed Forces designation for the Grob G 109.

== Operators ==
Australia (current as of 2014)

- Australian Defence Force (ADF) - Australian Air Force Cadets

United Kingdom (former)

- Royal Air Force
  - No. 2 Flying Training School RAF
    - Central Gliding School
    - Volunteer Gliding Squadrons

Thailand

- Royal Thai Air Force

== Specifications (G 109B) ==
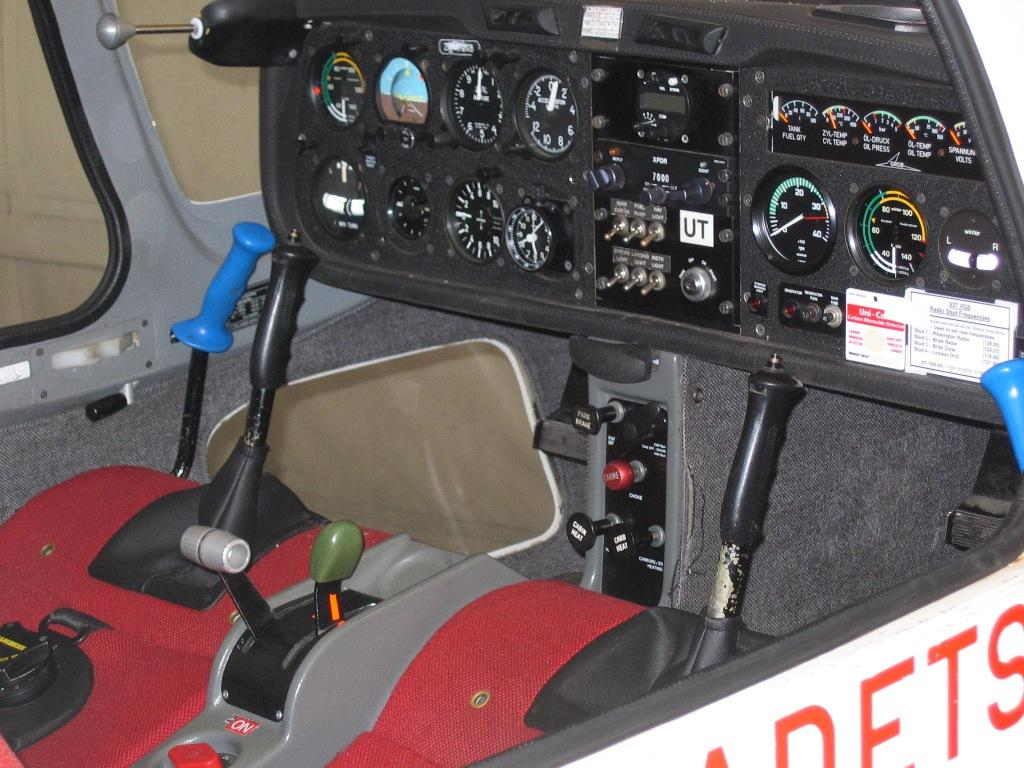
G 109B cockpit.

Data from Jane's all the World's Aircraft 1985–86

General characteristics

- Crew: 2
- Length: 8.1 m (26 ft 7 in)
- Wingspan: 17.4 m (57 ft 1 in)
- Height: 1.8 m (5 ft 11 in)
- Wing area: 19 m^{2} (200 sq ft)
- Airfoil: Eppler E 580 (16.1%)
- Empty weight: 620 kg (1,367 lb)
- Max takeoff weight: 850 kg (1,874 lb)
- Fuel capacity: 100 L (22 imp gal; 26 US gal)
- Powerplant: 1 × Grob 2500E1 air-cooled horizontally-opposed 4-cylinder 2.5 litre piston engine, 71 kW (95 hp)
- Propellers: 2-bladed Hoffmann HO-V 62 R/L 160 BT 3-speed variable-pitch propeller

Performance

- Cruise speed: 205 km/h (127 mph, 111 kn) maximum

180 km/h (110 mph; 97 kn) economical

- Stall speed: 73 km/h (45 mph, 39 kn)
- Never exceed speed: 240 km/h (150 mph, 130 kn)
- Range: 1,500 km (930 mi, 810 nmi) at economical cruise with maximum fuel
- Service ceiling: 6,000 m (20,000 ft)
- g limits: +5.3, -2.65
- Maximum glide ratio: 28 at 115 km/h (71 mph; 62 kn)
- Rate of climb: 3.3 m/s (650 ft/min)
- Rate of sink: 1.1 m/s (220 ft/min) at 105 km/h (65 mph; 57 kn)
- Wing loading: 44.7 kg/m^{2} (9.2 lb/sq ft)
- Power/mass: 0.079 kW/kg (0.048 hp/lb)
- Take-off run: 196 m (643 ft)
- Landing run: 200 m (656 ft)

Avionics

- VOR
- DME
- ADF
- Variometer
- Transponder

== See also ==
- Gliding

Aircraft of comparable role, configuration, and era

- Diamond HK36 Super Dimona
- Fournier RF-9
- Valentin Taifun

Related lists

- List of gliders
