= Warner Spacewalker =

Warner Space Walker or Spacewalker may refer to:

- Warner Space Walker I, a single-seat American homebuilt aircraft
- Warner Space Walker II, a two-seat American homebuilt aircraft
