= Warner Revolution =

Warner Revolution may refer to:

- Warner Revolution I, a single-seat American homebuilt aircraft
- Warner Revolution II, a two-seat American homebuilt aircraft
