= Revolution II =

Revolution II may refer to:

- New England Revolution II, an American professional soccer club based in the Greater Boston area
- Warner Revolution II, an American homebuilt aircraft
