= Model 45 =

Model 45 may refer to:

- Model 45A, an experimental rifle developed by the U.S. Army in 1945.
- Beech Model 45, better known as the T-34 Mentor, an American basic training aircraft.
- Fairchild Model 45, an American utility aircraft of the 1930s.
- Firestone Model 45, better known as the XR-9, an American experimental helicopter of the late 1940s.
- Wedell-Williams Model 45, an American racing aircraft of the 1930s.
