= Historical Aircraft Corporation =

American aircraft manufacturer

- Company type: Privately held company
- Industry: Aerospace
- Fate: Out of business
- Headquarters: Nucla, Colorado, United States
- Products: Kit aircraft

The Historical Aircraft Corporation was an American aircraft manufacturer based in Nucla, Colorado. The company specialized in the design and manufacture of kit aircraft that were scale replicas of Second World War and vintage aircraft.

Construction techniques used in the company's products included welded 4130 steel fuselage frames covered in either doped aircraft fabric or in a shell of polyurethane foam and fiberglass.

The company is no longer in business.

== Aircraft ==
Summary of aircraft built by the Historical Aircraft Corporation
Model name	First flight	Number built	Type
Historical P-51 Mustang			Replica of the North American P-51 Mustang
Historical F4U Corsair			Replica of the Chance-Vought F4U Corsair
Historical P-40C Tomahawk			Replica of the Curtiss P-40C Tomahawk
Historical PZL P.11c			Replica of the PZL P.11c
Historical Ryan STA	1997	1	Replica of the Ryan STA
