= Warner Sportster =

American homebuilt aircraft

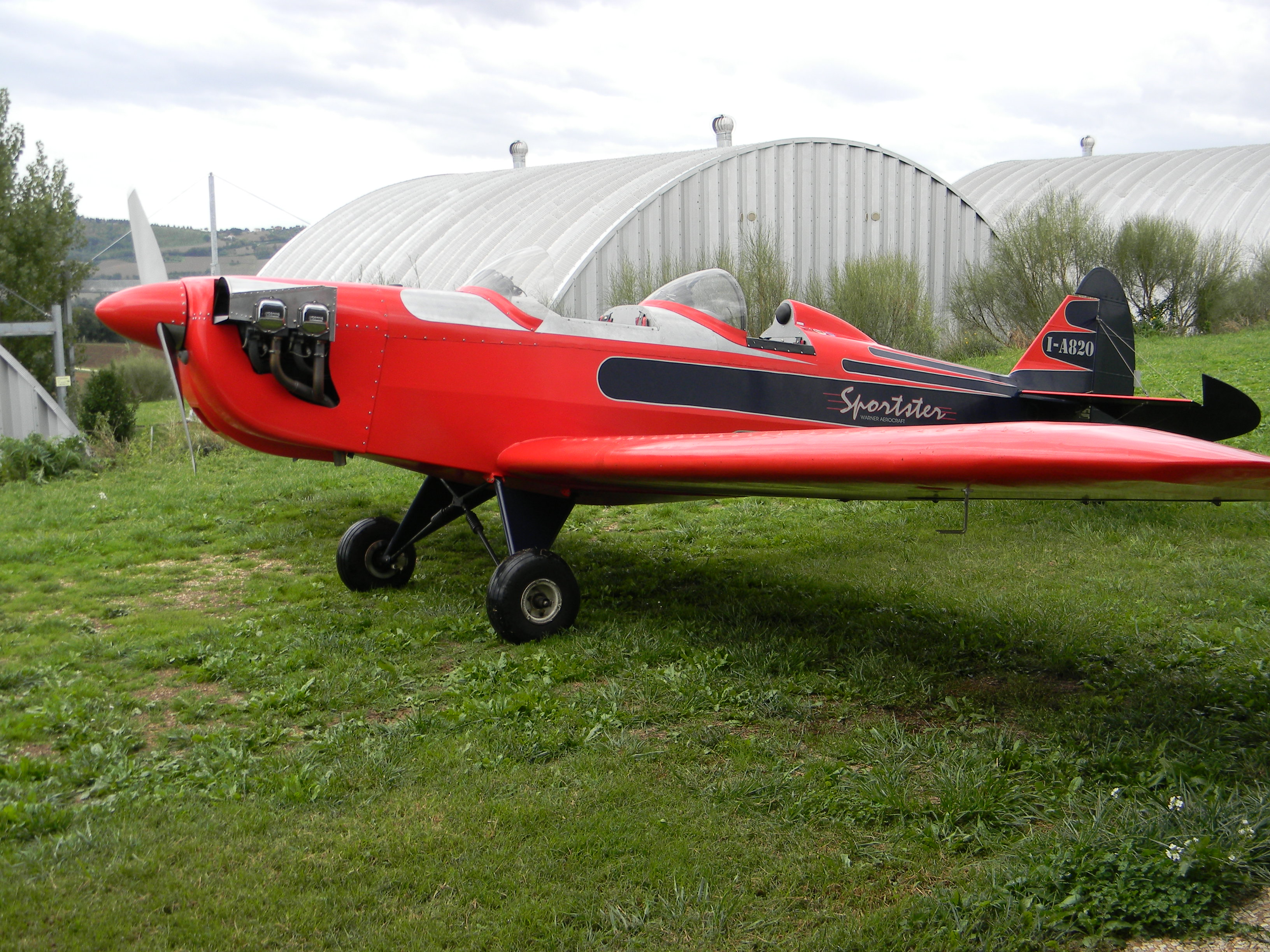

General information
- Type: Light-sport aircraft
- National origin: United States
- Manufacturer: Warner Aerocraft
- Designer: Jesse Anglin
- Status: In production (2017)
- Number built: 5

The Warner Sportster is an American light-sport aircraft, designed and produced by Warner Aerocraft of Seminole, Florida. The aircraft is only supplied as a complete ready-to-fly-aircraft.

== Design and development ==
The Sportster was designed by Jesse Anglin of Henderson, North Carolina. It was derived from his earlier design, the Warner Spacewalker II, to comply with the US light-sport aircraft rules. It features a cantilever low-wing, a single-seat or a two-seats-in-tandem open cockpit which can be optionally enclosed under a bubble canopy, fixed conventional landing gear and a single engine in tractor configuration.

The aircraft fuselage is made from welded steel tubing, with its wooden wings covered in doped aircraft fabric. Its 28.5 ft (8.7 m) span wing has an area of 112.1 sq ft (10.41 m^{2}). The standard engine available is the 100 hp (75 kW) Continental O-200 four-stroke powerplant. The 125 to 140 hp (93 to 104 kW) Lycoming O-290 has also been used.

As of March 2017, the design does not appear on the Federal Aviation Administration's list of approved special light-sport aircraft.

== Operational history ==
By March 2017 five examples had been registered in the United States with the Federal Aviation Administration, all in the experimental category.

== Specifications (Sportster two-seater) ==
Data from Bayerl and Warner Aerocraft

General characteristics

- Crew: one
- Capacity: one passenger
- Length: 21 ft 4 in (6.50 m)
- Wingspan: 28 ft 6 in (8.69 m)
- Height: 5 ft 6 in (1.68 m)
- Wing area: 112.1 sq ft (10.41 m^{2})
- Empty weight: 817 lb (371 kg)
- Gross weight: 1,320 lb (599 kg)
- Fuel capacity: standard: 14.5 U.S. gallons (55 L; 12.1 imp gal), optional 29 U.S. gallons (110 L; 24 imp gal)
- Powerplant: 1 × Continental O-200 four cylinder, air-cooled, four stroke aircraft engine, 100 hp (75 kW)
- Propellers: 2-bladed wooden

Performance

- Maximum speed: 130 mph (210 km/h, 110 kn)
- Cruise speed: 115 mph (185 km/h, 100 kn)
- Stall speed: 48 mph (77 km/h, 42 kn)
- Never exceed speed: 150 mph (240 km/h, 130 kn)
- g limits: +6/-4
- Rate of climb: 1,000 ft/min (5.1 m/s)
- Wing loading: 11.8 lb/sq ft (58 kg/m^{2})
