= R14 =

R14, R-14 or R.14 may refer to:

== Military ==
- Caudron R.14, a French experimental biplane fighter
- Firestone XR-14, a proposed American helicopter
- Johnson Model R-14, a proposed U.S semi-auto rifle
- R-14 Chusovaya, a Soviet ballistic missile
- USS R-14 (SS-91), a submarine of the United States Navy

== Roads ==
- R14 road (Ghana)
- R-14 regional road (Montenegro)

== Other uses ==
- R14 (New York City Subway car)
- R14 (Rodalies de Catalunya), a regional rail line in Catalonia, Spain
- Carbon tetrafluoride, a refrigerant
- Nkumbi language
- R14: Reacts violently with water, a risk phrase
- R14 battery, a dry cell
- Renault 14, a French compact car
