= Rogers Sportaire =

American homebuilt aircraft

Sportaire

General information
- Type: Homebuilt aircraft
- National origin: United States
- Manufacturer: Rogers Aircraft
- Designer: David M. Rogers
- Status: Production completed (1959)
- Number built: One

History
- Manufactured: 1959

The Rogers Sportaire is an American homebuilt aircraft that was designed David M. Rogers and produced by Rogers Aircraft of Riverside, California, introduced in 1959. The aircraft was supplied in the form of plans for amateur construction, but plans are no longer available. Only one was built.

== Design and development ==
The aircraft features a cantilever low-wing, a two-seats-in-side-by-side configuration enclosed cockpit under a bubble canopy, fixed tricycle landing gear and a single engine in tractor configuration.

The aircraft fuselage is made from welded steel tubing, with the 26.3 ft (8.0 m) span wing made from wood, all covered in doped aircraft fabric. The engine used in the sole example is a 125 hp (93 kW) Lycoming O-290 powerplant.

The aircraft has an empty weight of 984 lb (446 kg) and a gross weight of 1,600 lb (730 kg), giving a useful load of 616 lb (279 kg). With full fuel of 22 U.S. gallons (83 L; 18 imp gal) the payload is 484 lb (220 kg).

== Operational history ==
By October 2013 only one example had been registered in the United States with the Federal Aviation Administration.

== Specifications (Sportaire) ==
Data from Plane and Pilot

General characteristics

- Crew: one
- Capacity: one passenger
- Length: 18 ft 0 in (5.49 m)
- Wingspan: 26 ft 4 in (8.03 m)
- Wing area: 102.1 sq ft (9.49 m^{2})
- Aspect ratio: 6.8
- Airfoil: NACA 4418
- Empty weight: 984 lb (446 kg)
- Gross weight: 1,600 lb (726 kg)
- Fuel capacity: 22 U.S. gal (83 L)
- Aileron area: 5.17 sq ft (0.480 m^{2})
- Flap area: 11.94 sq ft (1.109 m^{2})
- Horizontal tail area: 19.37 sq ft (1.800 m^{2})
- Vertical tail area: 10.55 sq ft (0.980 m^{2})
- Horizontal tail airfoil: NACA 0009
- Vertical tail airfoil: NACA 0009
- Wing span efficiency factor: 0.8855
- Nose wheel tire: 12.59 in (0.320 m) diameter × 4.62 in (0.117 m) width
- Main wheel tire: 13.39 in (0.340 m) diameter × 4.62 in (0.117 m) width
- Powerplant: 1 × Lycoming O-290 four cylinder, air-cooled, four stroke aircraft engine, 125 hp (93 kW)

Performance

- Maximum speed: 160 mph (257 km/h, 140 kn)
- Cruise speed: 150 mph (241 km/h, 130 kn)
- Stall speed: 55 mph (89 km/h, 48 kn)
- Range: 400 mi (644 km, 350 nmi)
- Rate of climb: 1,000 ft/min (5.1 m/s)
