= Van Lith VI =

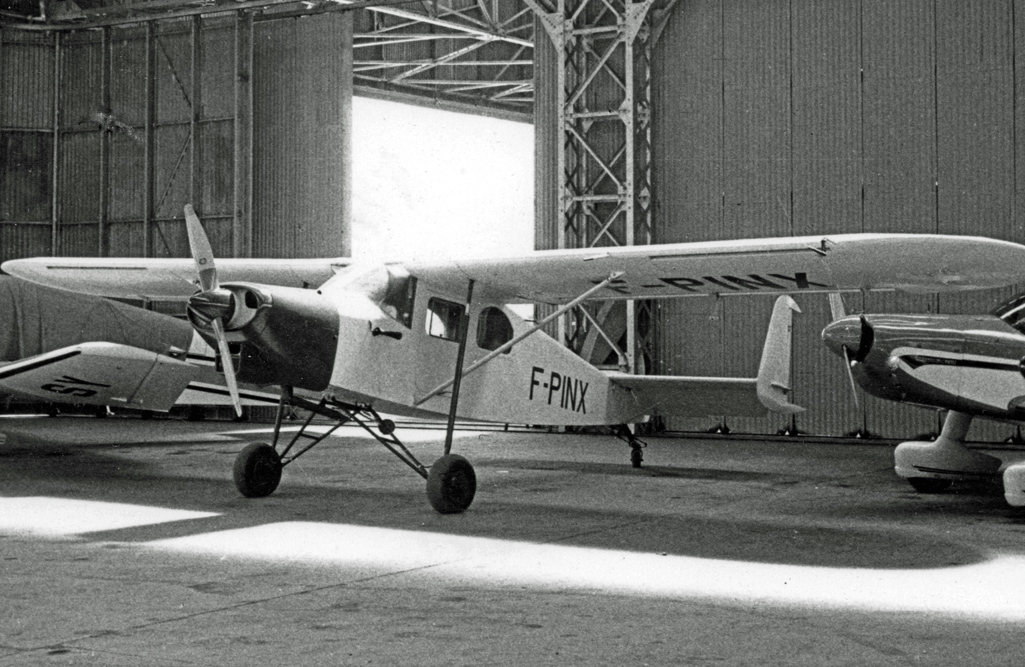
- The sole Van Lith VI hangared at Guyancourt airfield near Paris in 1967

General information
- Type: Light civil utility aircraft
- National origin: France
- Manufacturer: Jean Van Lith
- Designer: Jean Van Lith
- Primary user: the constructor

History
- Introduction date: 1959
- First flight: 30 August 1959

The Van Lith VI was a one-off French-built light civil utility aircraft of the late 1950s.

== Development and design ==
The Van Lith VI was a two/three seat light high-wing cabin monoplane of conventional wooden construction. The wing was a two-spar structure with plywood and fabric covering. The fuselage was of rectangular section with plywood cladding. The main undercarriage with fixed legs, wheels, brakes and tailwheel were adapted from those of the Stampe SV.4. The pilot and passengers were seated in tandem with an access door on each side hinging upward for entry and exit. The slotted ailerons could be drooped together to function as flaps. It was initially flown with a single fin, but this was replaced with twin fins.

== Operational history ==
One example of the design was completed. It was flown by the constructor from airfields at Toussus-le-Noble and Guyancourt near Paris. It was still registered to Jean Van Lith in 1964, and was active until at least 1967, but is no longer extant.

== Specifications ==
Data from Green, 1965

General characteristics

- Crew: 1
- Capacity: 1 or 2 passengers
- Length: 20 ft 0 in (6.10 m)
- Wingspan: 35 ft 5 in (10.80 m)
- Height: 6 ft 6 in (1.98 m)
- Wing area: 140 sq ft (13 m^{2})
- Empty weight: 1,285 lb (583 kg)
- Gross weight: 2,127 lb (965 kg)
- Powerplant: 1 × Lycoming O-290-3 piston, 135 hp (101 kW)

Performance

- Maximum speed: 124 mph (200 km/h, 108 kn)
- Cruise speed: 106 mph (171 km/h, 92 kn)
- Service ceiling: 13,780 ft (4,200 m)
- Rate of climb: 785 ft/min (3.99 m/s)
