= Historical F4U Corsair =

American homebuilt aircraft

F4U Corsair

General information
- Type: Homebuilt aircraft
- National origin: United States
- Manufacturer: Historical Aircraft Corporation
- Status: Production completed

History
- Developed from: Chance-Vought F4U Corsair

The Historical F4U Corsair is an American homebuilt aircraft that was designed and produced by the Historical Aircraft Corporation of Nucla, Colorado. The aircraft is a 60% scale replica of the original Chance-Vought F4U Corsair and when it was available was supplied as a kit for amateur construction.

== Design and development ==
The aircraft features a cantilever low gull wing, a single-seat enclosed cockpit under a bubble canopy, retractable conventional landing gear and a single engine in tractor configuration.

The aircraft is made from welded steel tubing covered in a shell of polyurethane foam and fiberglass. Its 24.80 ft (7.6 m) span wing, mounts flaps and has a wing area of 127.5 sq ft (11.85 m^{2}). The cockpit width is 21 in (53 cm). The standard engine used is the 230 hp (172 kW) Ford Motor Company V-6 automotive conversion powerplant.

The aircraft has a typical empty weight of 1,405 lb (637 kg) and a gross weight of 2,004 lb (909 kg), giving a useful load of 599 lb (272 kg). With full fuel of 45 U.S. gallons (170 L; 37 imp gal) the payload for pilot and baggage is 329 lb (149 kg).

The aircraft has fairly lengthy runway requirements with a standard day sea level take-off distance of 1,200 ft (366 m) and a landing distance of 1,500 ft (457 m).

The kit included prefabricated assemblies, the engine and scale fixed pitch propeller, instruments and avionics. The manufacturer estimated the construction time from the supplied kit as 2000 hours.

== Specifications (F4U) ==
Data from AeroCrafter

General characteristics

- Crew: one
- Length: 21.20 ft (6.46 m)
- Wingspan: 24.80 ft (7.56 m)
- Wing area: 127.5 sq ft (11.85 m^{2})
- Empty weight: 1,405 lb (637 kg)
- Gross weight: 2,004 lb (909 kg)
- Fuel capacity: 45 U.S. gallons (170 L; 37 imp gal)
- Powerplant: 1 × Ford Motor Company V-6 four stroke automotive conversion powerplant, 230 hp (170 kW)
- Propellers: 4-bladed fixed pitch composite

Performance

- Maximum speed: 256 mph (412 km/h, 222 kn)
- Cruise speed: 225 mph (362 km/h, 196 kn)
- Stall speed: 55 mph (89 km/h, 48 kn) flaps and gear down
- Range: 650 mi (1,050 km, 560 nmi)
- Service ceiling: 26,250 ft (8,000 m)
- Rate of climb: 2,235 ft/min (11.35 m/s)
- Wing loading: 15.72 lb/sq ft (76.8 kg/m^{2})
