= Historical PZL P.11c =

American homebuilt aircraft

PZL P.11c

General information
- Type: Homebuilt aircraft
- National origin: United States
- Manufacturer: Historical Aircraft Corporation
- Status: Production completed

History
- Developed from: PZL P.11c

The Historical PZL P.11c is an American homebuilt aircraft that was designed and produced by Historical Aircraft Corporation of Nucla, Colorado. The aircraft is a 66% scale replica of the Polish PZL P.11c fighter and when it was available was supplied as a kit for amateur construction.

== Design and development ==
The aircraft features a strut-braced high-wing, a single-seat open cockpit with a windshield, fixed conventional landing gear and a single engine in tractor configuration.

The aircraft is made from welded steel tubing and wood, with its flying surfaces covered in doped aircraft fabric. Its 30.00 ft (9.1 m) span wing employs a NACA 2412 airfoil and has a wing area of 84.00 sq ft (7.804 m^{2}). The cockpit width is 21 in (53 cm). The standard engine used is the 100 hp (75 kW) CAM 100 four stroke powerplant.

The aircraft has a typical empty weight of 800 lb (360 kg) and a gross weight of 1,100 lb (500 kg), giving a useful load of 300 lb (140 kg). With full fuel of 11 U.S. gallons (42 L; 9.2 imp gal) the payload for the pilot and baggage is 234 lb (106 kg).

The kit included prefabricated assemblies, the engine and scale fixed pitch propeller, basic VFR instruments, fabric and even paint. Also included were replica 7.9 mm machine guns and a ring gun site. The manufacturer indicated that the design was intended for novice builders and estimated the construction time from the supplied kit as 1400 hours.

== Specifications (PZL P.11c) ==
Data from AeroCrafter and The Incomplete Guide to Airfoil Usage

General characteristics

- Crew: one
- Length: 18.30 ft (5.58 m)
- Wingspan: 30.00 ft (9.14 m)
- Wing area: 84.00 sq ft (7.804 m^{2})
- Airfoil: NACA 2412
- Empty weight: 800 lb (363 kg)
- Gross weight: 1,100 lb (499 kg)
- Fuel capacity: 11 U.S. gallons (42 L; 9.2 imp gal)
- Powerplant: 1 × CAM 100 four cylinder, air-cooled, four stroke aircraft engine, 100 hp (75 kW)
- Propellers: 2-bladed composite

Performance

- Maximum speed: 105 mph (169 km/h, 91 kn)
- Cruise speed: 90 mph (140 km/h, 78 kn)
- Stall speed: 55 mph (89 km/h, 48 kn)
- Range: 300 mi (480 km, 260 nmi)
- Service ceiling: 12,500 ft (3,800 m)
- Rate of climb: 800 ft/min (4.1 m/s)
- Wing loading: 13.1 lb/sq ft (64 kg/m^{2})

Armament

- Guns: replica 7.9 mm machine guns
