= Historical P-40C Tomahawk =

American homebuilt aircraft

P-40C Tomahawk

General information
- Type: Homebuilt aircraft
- National origin: United States
- Manufacturer: Historical Aircraft Corporation
- Status: Production completed

History
- Developed from: Curtiss P-40C Tomahawk

The Historical P-40C Tomahawk is an American homebuilt aircraft that was designed and produced by the Historical Aircraft Corporation of Nucla, Colorado. The aircraft is a 62.5% scale replica of the original Curtiss P-40C Tomahawk and when it was available was supplied as a kit for amateur construction.

== Design and development ==
The aircraft features a cantilever low-wing, a single-seat enclosed cockpit under a framed aircraft canopy, retractable conventional landing gear and a single engine in tractor configuration.

The aircraft is made from welded steel tubing covered in a shell of polyurethane foam and fiberglass. Its 24.50 ft (7.5 m) span wing, mounts flaps and has a wing area of 100.00 sq ft (9.290 m^{2}). The cockpit width is 21 in (53 cm). The standard engine used is the 230 hp (172 kW) Ford Motor Company V-6 automotive conversion powerplant.

The aircraft has a typical empty weight of 1,347 lb (611 kg) and a gross weight of 1,938 lb (879 kg), giving a useful load of 591 lb (268 kg). With full fuel of 42 U.S. gallons (160 L; 35 imp gal) the payload for pilot and baggage is 339 lb (154 kg).

The aircraft has fairly lengthy runway requirements with a standard day sea level take-off distance of 1,200 ft (366 m) and a landing distance of 1,500 ft (457 m).

The kit included prefabricated assemblies, the engine and scale fixed pitch propeller, instruments, avionics and even paint. The manufacturer estimated the construction time from the supplied kit as 2000 hours.

== Specifications (P-40C) ==
Data from AeroCrafter

General characteristics

- Crew: one
- Length: 21.27 ft (6.48 m)
- Wingspan: 24.50 ft (7.47 m)
- Wing area: 100.00 sq ft (9.290 m^{2})
- Empty weight: 1,347 lb (611 kg)
- Gross weight: 1,938 lb (879 kg)
- Fuel capacity: 42 U.S. gallons (160 L; 35 imp gal)
- Powerplant: 1 × Ford Motor Company V-6 four stroke automotive conversion powerplant, 230 hp (170 kW)
- Propellers: 3-bladed fixed pitch composite

Performance

- Maximum speed: 250 mph (400 km/h, 220 kn)
- Cruise speed: 224 mph (360 km/h, 195 kn)
- Stall speed: 61 mph (98 km/h, 53 kn) flaps and gear down
- Range: 650 mi (1,050 km, 560 nmi)
- Service ceiling: 27,250 ft (8,310 m)
- Rate of climb: 2,365 ft/min (12.01 m/s)
- Wing loading: 19.38 lb/sq ft (94.6 kg/m^{2})
