= Toyo T-T.10 =

T-T.10
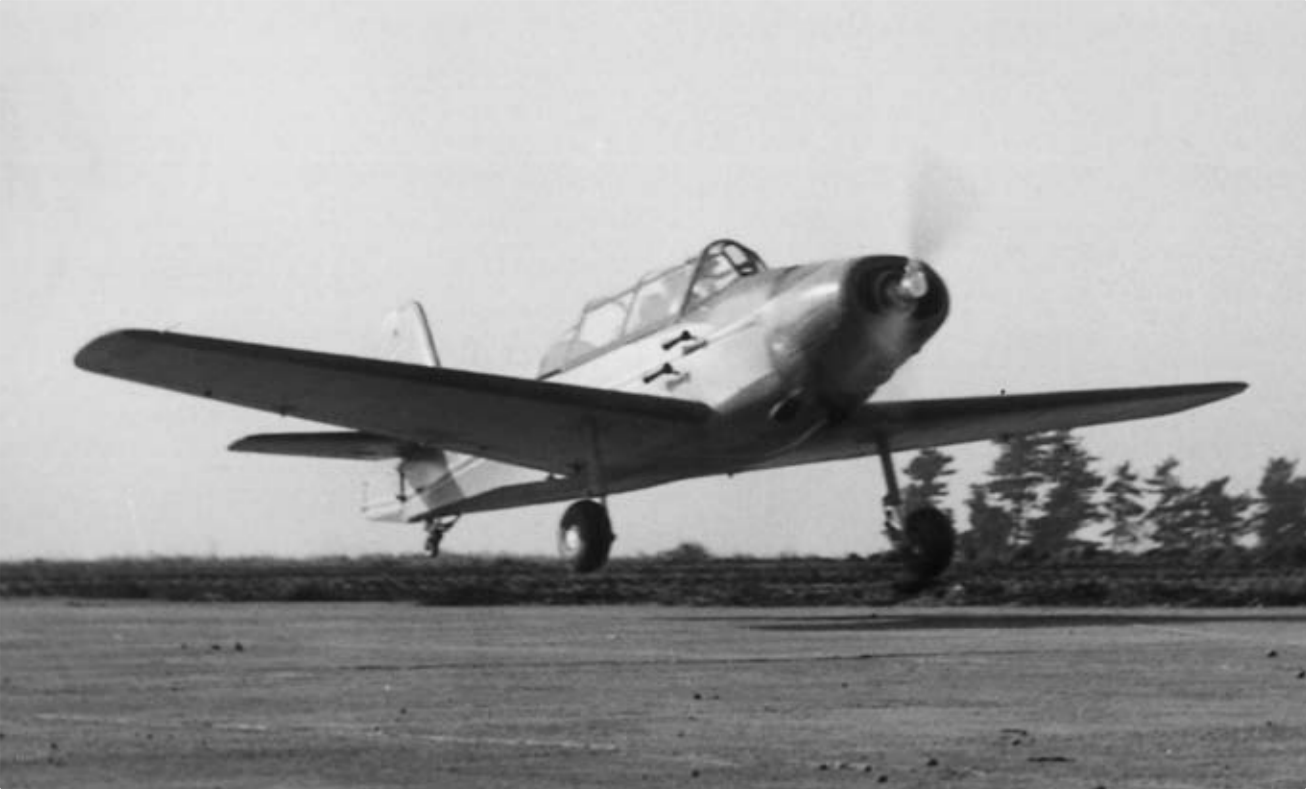

General information
- Type: Two-seat trainer
- National origin: Japan
- Manufacturer: Toyo Aircraft Manufacturing Co. (Toyo Koku Kabushiki Kaisha)
- Designer: Yoshio Hashiguchi
- Number built: at least 2

History
- First flight: 30 December 1952

The Toyo Kukku T-T.10 is a low wing, single engine training aircraft which seats two in tandem. It was designed and built in Japan in 1952.

== Development ==
Toyo Aircraft was established in June 1952 and their first aircraft, the T-T.10, was completed by the end of the year. It is of mixed construction; the wing is built entirely from wood and fabric around two spars, with a plywood skin enclosed within fabric. The flaps and ailerons are wood framed and fabric covered. In planform the wings are straight tapered with rounded tips; most of the taper is on the trailing edge. There is 6° of dihedral. The T-T.10's tail surfaces are also straight tapered with rounded tips, generally wood framed with fabric covering. Its horizontal tail is mounted at the top of the fuselage. The elevators have a cut-out to allow rudder movement, as the latter extends down to the keel. There is a trim tab on the port elevator.

The fuselage of the T-T.10 is fabric covered over a welded chrome-molybdenum steel frame. The engine is a 140 hp (104 kW) Lycoming O-290-D2 flat four, driving a two-bladed propeller. Student and instructor sit in tandem with dual controls under a multi-framed, continuous, two part sliding canopy. The rear fuselage line is raised compared with the forward section, but not to the full canopy height. The T-T.10 has conventional landing gear, with narrowly faired cantilever, coil spring damped mainlegs and a tailwheel.

The first T-T.10, registration JA3026, flew for the first time on 30 December 1952; the first production model (JA3049) followed soon after, on 11 February 1953. Production numbers are not known exactly; one report speaks of a "small batch" but only the first two T-T.10s appear in the single engine serial range JA3001 - JA3100, which covers the period August 1952 to September 1955, so they may constitute the whole batch.

== Aircraft on display ==
- Tokyo Metropolitan College F.A.M.E. Gallery: T-T.10 JA3026

== Specifications ==
Data from Jane's All the World's Aircraft 1956/57

General characteristics

- Crew: 2
- Length: 7.15 m (23 ft 5 in)
- Wingspan: 8.60 m (28 ft 3 in)
- Height: 2.10 m (6 ft 11 in) tail down
- Wing area: 12.0 m^{2} (129 sq ft)
- Aspect ratio: 6.0
- Airfoil: NACA 1415 at root, 2410 (modified) tip
- Empty weight: 568 kg (1,252 lb)
- Gross weight: 800 kg (1,764 lb)
- Fuel capacity: 90 L (19.8 Imp gal; 23.8 US gal)
- Powerplant: × Lycoming O-290-D2 4-cylinder horizontally opposed air cooled, 100 kW (140 hp)
- Propellers: 2-bladed Sensenich CSM3FM4/C374 fixed pitch

Performance

- Maximum speed: 235 km/h (146 mph, 127 kn) at sea level
- Cruise speed: 190 km/h (120 mph, 100 kn)
- Stall speed: 80 km/h (50 mph, 43 kn) with 30° flaps
- Service ceiling: 4,300 m (14,100 ft) service
- Rate of climb: 3.8 m/s (750 ft/min) initial
- Wing loading: 67 kg/m^{2} (14 lb/sq ft)
- Power/mass: 8.0 kg/kW (13.1 lb/hp)
- Take-off distance to clear 15.25 m (50 ft): 290 m (950 ft)
- Landing distance from 15.25 m (50 ft): 300 m (985 ft)
