= Firewall Forward CAM 100 =

CAM 100
- Type: Piston aircraft engine
- National origin: Canada
- Manufacturer: Firewall Forward Aero Engines

The Firewall Forward CAM 100 is a 100 hp (75 kW) four-cylinder, four-stroke liquid-cooled piston aircraft engine built by Firewall Forward Aero Engines. Originally designed and built by Canadian Airmotive as the CAM 100 and later marketed by The Cam-Fire Engine Group, it is based on a Honda Civic automotive piston engine.

== Applications ==
- ARV Griffin
- Blue Yonder Merlin
- Denney Kitfox V
- Historical PZL P.11c
- Historical Ryan STA
- Midget Mustang
- Murphy Rebel
- Zenith Zodiac CH 601

== Specifications (CAM 100) ==
Data from World Directory of Leisure Aviation & Firewell Forward Aero Engines

=== General characteristics ===
- Type: Four-cylinder, four-stroke piston engine
- Bore: 74 mm (3.07 in)
- Stroke: 86.5 mm (3.41 in)
- Displacement: 1488 cm_{3} (90.7 cu in)
- Length: 32 inches (810 mm)
- Width: 19.5 inches (500 mm)
- Height: 25 inches (640 mm)
- Dry weight: 226.2 pounds (102.6 kg)

=== Components ===
- Valvetrain: overhead camshaft
- Fuel type: 90 Octane petrol or 100LL aviation petrol
- Cooling system: Uses a water-glycol mixture with a camshaft belt driven water pump.
- Reduction gear: 2.4:1 reduction ratio (6,000 rpm engine, 2,500 rpm propeller).
- Starting system Electric gear reduction starter.

=== Performance ===
- Power output: 100hp (74.6 kW) at propeller flange.
- Specific power: 130 kW/L (1.10 hp/cu in)
- Compression ratio: 9.6:1
- Specific fuel consumption: 0.43 lb/bhp/hr at 80% power

== See also ==
Related development

- Firewall Forward CAM 125

Related lists

- List of aircraft engines
