= Warner Aerocraft =

American aircraft manufacturer

Warner Aerocraft Company
- Company type: Privately held company
- Industry: Aerospace
- Headquarters: Seminole, Florida, United States
- Key people: Pat Bulger
- Products: Light-sport aircraft
- Website: www.warnerair.com

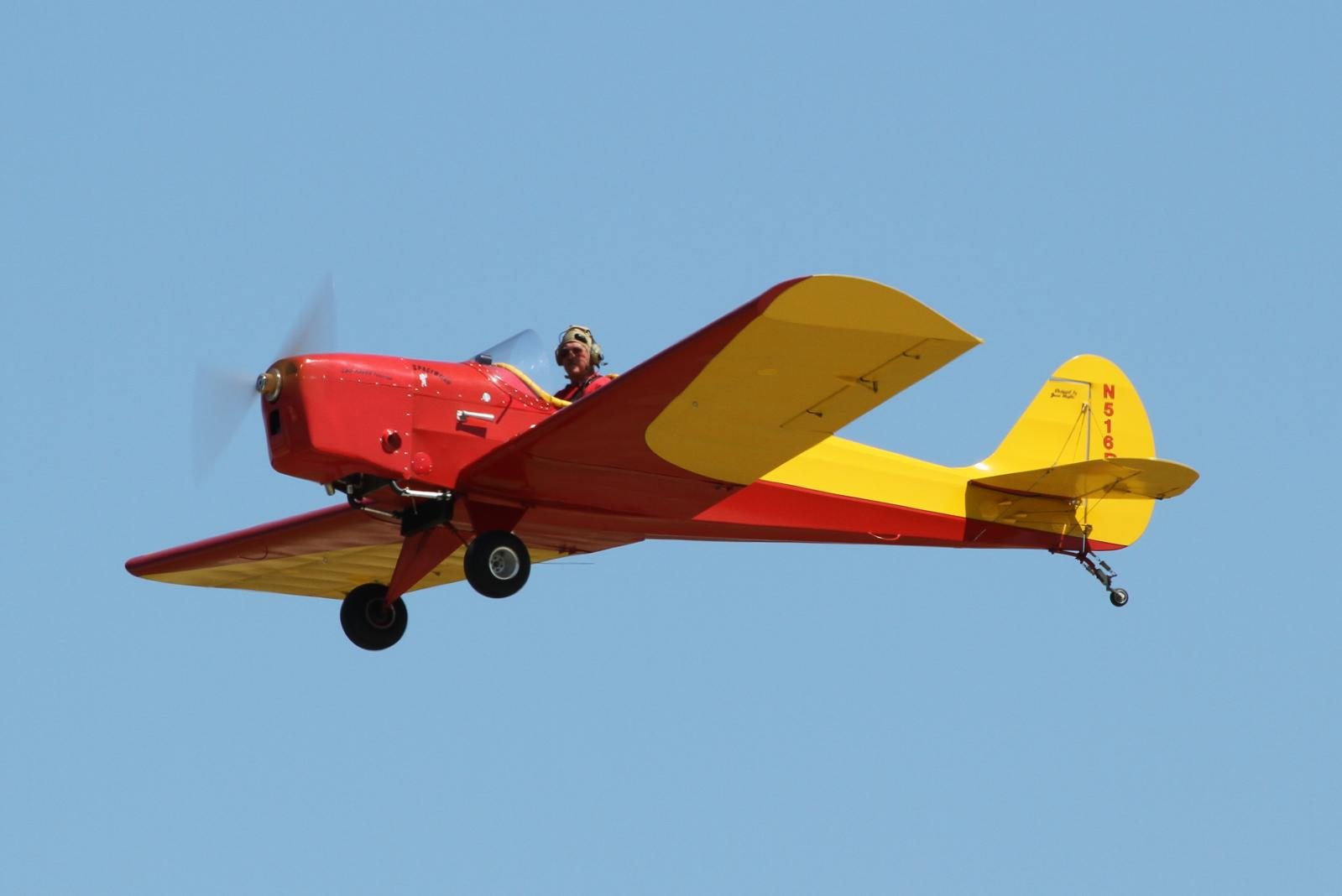
Space Walker I

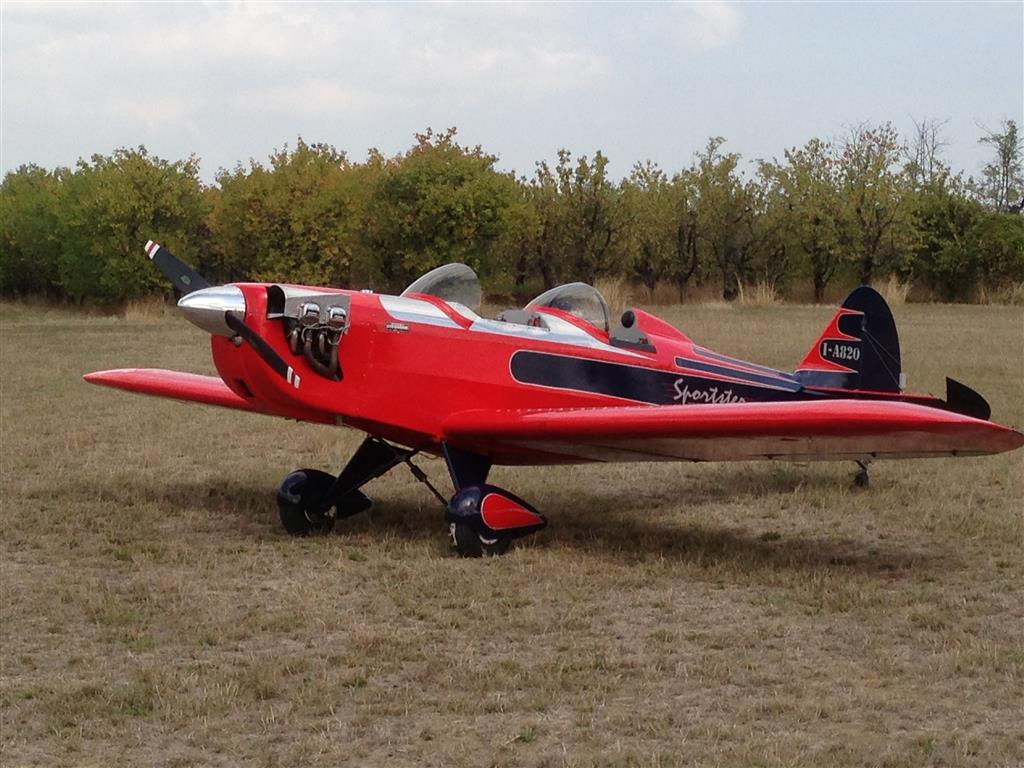
Warner Sportster light-sport aircraft

The Warner Aerocraft Company is an American aircraft manufacturer based in Seminole, Florida. In the past the company specialized in the design and manufacture of light aircraft in the form of plans and kits for amateur construction, but in recent years has concentrated on a ready-to-fly light-sport aircraft design.

The company's motto is "Puts the Sport in Sport Pilot".

The company started producing plans for the single-seat Warner Revolution I, also called the Spacewalker I. This design was developed into the tandem two-seat Warner Revolution II, also called the Spacewalker II. Both the Revolution I and II are now out of production.

The most recent development of the basic design is the Warner Sportster light-sport aircraft, first flown in 1999 which, in 2014, is offered as a complete-ready to-fly aircraft with Federal Aviation Administration light-sport approval in progress. The company indicates that kits are not currently available.

== Aircraft ==
Summary of aircraft built by Warner Aerocraft
Model name	First flight	Number built	Type
Warner Revolution I		3 (2014)	Single seat, open cockpit light aircraft. Also called the Space Walker I.
Warner Revolution II		30 (2014)	Two seat, open cockpit light aircraft. Also called the Space Walker II.
Warner Sportster	1999		Two seat, open cockpit light-sport aircraft
