= ARV Griffin =

Canadian homebuilt airplane

General information
- Type: Homebuilt aircraft
- National origin: Canada
- Manufacturer: Canada Air RV; AC Millennium Corp
- Designer: Dave Marsden
- Status: Production completed
- Number built: 5 (2013)

The ARV Griffin is a Canadian homebuilt aircraft that was designed by Dave Marsden of the University of Alberta and produced by Canada Air RV and later by AC Millennium Corp, both of Edmonton. When it was available the aircraft was supplied as a kit for amateur construction.

Both companies are out of business and production ended.

== Design and development ==
The aircraft features a strut-braced high wing, a two-seats-in-side-by-side configuration enclosed cockpit accessed via doors, fixed tricycle landing gear, or, optionally conventional landing gear with wheel pants and a single engine in tractor configuration.

The aircraft is made from sheet aluminum. Its 35.50 ft (10.8 m) span high aspect ratio wing employs a Marsden-designed IARV 419 airfoil, mounts flaps and has a wing area of 136.00 sq ft (12.635 m^{2}). Winglets were a factory option to improve low speed handling, lateral control and STOL performance. The cabin width is 47 in (120 cm) and the wings detach for ground transportation or storage. The acceptable power range for the Griffin Mark III is 65 to 150 hp (48 to 112 kW) and the standard engines used are the 100 hp (75 kW) Continental O-200A, 80 hp (60 kW) Rotax 912, 74 hp (55 kW) Rotax 618 two-stroke or the 100 hp (75 kW) CAM 100 powerplants. Mounts were also available for the 130 hp (97 kW) Subaru EA81, 108 hp (81 kW) Lycoming O-235 and Suzuki engines.

The Griffin Mark III has a typical empty weight of 840 lb (380 kg) and a gross weight of 1,500 lb (680 kg), giving a useful load of 660 lb (300 kg). With a full fuel load of 37 U.S. gallons (140 L; 31 imp gal) the payload for pilot, passenger and baggage is 438 lb (199 kg). The seats are fully adjustable and removable.

The fitting of floats and skis was listed as being under development in 1998. The Mark III kit included all-aluminum parts cut and bent, with fuselage, wing and tail assemblies pre-jigged. The aircraft could be bought as four separate sub-kits. The manufacturer estimates the construction time from the supplied kit as 800 hours for the Mark III and 600 hours for the Mark IV.

== Operational history ==
By 1998 the company reported that 18 kits had been sold and three aircraft were flying.

In December 2013 four were registered with Transport Canada and one in the United States with the Federal Aviation Administration.

== Variants ==
Griffin
Initial version developed by Canada Air RV, with gross weight of 1,500 lb (680 kg) and powered by a 100 hp (75 kW) Continental O-200A.
Griffin Mark III
Version produced by Canada Air RV and AC Millennium, with gross weight of 1,500 lb (680 kg) and powered by a 100 hp (75 kW) Continental O-200A, 74 hp (55 kW) Rotax 618 two-stroke, 80 hp (60 kW) Rotax 912 or 100 hp (75 kW) CAM 100.
Griffin Mark IV
Version produced by AC Millennium, with gross weight of 1,730 lb (780 kg), a wing area of 115.5 sq ft (10.73 m^{2}) and powered by a 160 hp (119 kW) Lycoming O-320.

== Specifications (Griffin Mark III) ==
Data from AeroCrafter and The Incomplete Guide to Airfoil Usage

General characteristics

- Crew: one
- Capacity: one passenger
- Length: 21 ft 0 in (6.40 m)
- Wingspan: 35 ft 6 in (10.82 m)
- Wing area: 136.00 sq ft (12.635 m^{2})
- Aspect ratio: 9.27
- Airfoil: IARV 419
- Empty weight: 840 lb (381 kg)
- Gross weight: 1,500 lb (680 kg)
- Fuel capacity: 37 U.S. gallons (140 L; 31 imp gal)
- Powerplant: 1 × Continental O-200A four cylinder, air-cooled, four stroke aircraft engine, 100 hp (75 kW)
- Propellers: 2-bladed fixed pitch

Performance

- Maximum speed: 135 mph (217 km/h, 117 kn)
- Cruise speed: 121 mph (195 km/h, 105 kn)
- Stall speed: 45 mph (72 km/h, 39 kn) flaps down
- Range: 700 mi (1,100 km, 610 nmi)
- Service ceiling: 13,000 ft (4,000 m)
- Rate of climb: 1,030 ft/min (5.2 m/s)
- Wing loading: 11.0 lb/sq ft (54 kg/m^{2})
