= Firestone XR-14 =

XR-14

General information
- Type: Utility helicopter
- National origin: United States
- Manufacturer: Firestone Aircraft Company
- Status: Cancelled
- Primary user: United States Army Air Forces

History
- Developed from: Firestone XR-9

The Firestone XR-14 was a proposed 1940s American lightweight helicopter, designed by the Firestone Aircraft Company to operate in the liaison and observation helicopter for the United States Army Air Forces. Due to changing requirements no examples of the type were built.

== Design and development ==
Three Firestone Model GA-50 helicopters were ordered by the United States Army Air Forces for evaluation in the liaison and observation roles, competing against the Bell XR-15 for a production contract. Derived from the Model GA-45 (XR-9) helicopter, the XR-14 was intended to be a four-seat aircraft, powered by a Continental A100 four-cylinder opposed piston engine; unconventionally, the XR-14 was intended to be equipped with two tail rotors. Prior to any of the aircraft being converted, however, the Army cancelled the contract; while Firestone attempted to market the GA-50 on the civilian market, no interest was forthcoming and the project was abandoned.

== See also ==
Related lists

- List of rotorcraft
