= Adkisson SJ-1 Head Skinner =

Type of aircraft

SJ-1 Headskinner

General information
- Type: Homebuilt aircraft
- National origin: United States of America
- Designer: Earl and Jerry Adkisson
- Number built: 1

History
- First flight: 1957
- Developed from: Luscombe 8A

The SJ-1 Head Skinner was a single-seat, gull-wing sports plane built in the US by brothers Earl and Jerry Adkisson of Tuscola, Illinois in 1957.

== Design and development ==
Earl ("Skeezix") and Jerry Adkisson, two brothers at Tuscola airport, joined the Experimental Aircraft Association (EAA) in 1955 and began gathering material for their construction project in the Autumn of that year. Their aircraft would be patterned after the P.Z.L. P.24, a popular Polish gull-winged fighter aircraft of World War II.

Using wings from a 1946 Luscombe 8, cut and re-formed into the gull-wing configuration, the cabin and forward fuselage section were formed of steel tubes. A Luscombe tailcone was attached to the aft end of the steel-tube frame, and standard Luscombe tail surfaces were adapted, with their tips squared off. The spring-steel main landing gear was taken from a Cessna. The planned engine was a 125 to 145 hp (93 to 108 kW) Warner radial engine, but settled for a 65 hp (48 kW) Continental A65 driving a Beech-Robey controllable propeller in the initial installation.

== Specifications (SJ-1 Head Skinner) ==
Data from Aerofiles

General characteristics

- Crew: 1
- Capacity: 300 lb (136 kg)
- Length: 20 ft 0 in (6.10 m)
- Wingspan: 24 ft 6 in (7.47 m)
- Powerplant: 1 × Lycoming O-290-G4 4-cyl air-cooled horizontally opposed piston engine, 125 hp (93 kW)

Performance

- Maximum speed: 160 kn (180 mph, 290 km/h)
- Cruise speed: 130 kn (150 mph, 240 km/h)
- Stall speed: 52 kn (60 mph, 97 km/h)
- Range: 260 nmi (300 mi, 480 km)
