= Historical Ryan STA =

American light aircraft

Ryan STA
- The prototype Historical Ryan STA on display

General information
- Type: Homebuilt aircraft
- National origin: United States
- Manufacturer: Historical Aircraft Corporation
- Status: Production completed
- Number built: One

History
- Introduction date: 1997
- Developed from: Ryan STA

The Historical Ryan STA was an American homebuilt aircraft that was designed and produced by the Historical Aircraft Corporation of Nucla, Colorado. The aircraft was an 85% scale replica of the original Ryan STA and when it was available was supplied as a kit for amateur construction.

== Design and development ==
The aircraft featured a wire-braced and strut-braced low-wing, two seats in separate tandem open cockpits with windshields, fixed conventional landing gear and a single engine in tractor configuration.

The aircraft fuselage was made from welded steel tubing, while the wings had wooden spars and ribs covered in doped aircraft fabric. Several prefabricated components were supplied as part of the kit, including the fuselage frame, landing gear, engine mount and tail assembly. The manufacturer rated the STA kit as suitable for beginners and estimated the construction time from the supplied kit as 1500 hours. The kit could be completed to represent an STA, a military PT-16 or a PT-20.

The aircraft's 26.00 ft (7.9 m) span wing had an area of 112.6 sq ft (10.46 m^{2}). The cockpit width was 22 in (56 cm) and the standard engine used was the 100 hp (75 kW) CAM 100 powerplant. It had a typical empty weight of 725 lb (329 kg) and a gross weight of 1,275 lb (578 kg), giving a useful load of 500 lb (230 kg). With full fuel of 23 U.S. gallons (87 L; 19 imp gal) the payload for pilot, passenger and baggage was 362 lb (164 kg).

== Operational history ==
In January 2014 no examples remained registered in the United States with the Federal Aviation Administration. Although one aircraft had been registered in 1997, it was listed as destroyed and deregistered in 2002. It is likely that no examples exist today.

== Specifications (STA) ==
Data from AeroCrafter

General characteristics

- Crew: one
- Capacity: one passenger
- Length: 20.10 ft (6.13 m)
- Wingspan: 26.00 ft (7.92 m)
- Wing area: 112.6 sq ft (10.46 m^{2})
- Empty weight: 725 lb (329 kg)
- Gross weight: 1,275 lb (578 kg)
- Fuel capacity: 23 U.S. gallons (87 L; 19 imp gal)
- Powerplant: 1 × CAM 100 four cylinder four stroke aircraft engine, 100 hp (75 kW)
- Propellers: 2-bladed fixed pitch wooden

Performance

- Maximum speed: 125 mph (201 km/h, 109 kn)
- Cruise speed: 110 mph (180 km/h, 96 kn)
- Stall speed: 53 mph (85 km/h, 46 kn)
- Range: 490 mi (790 km, 430 nmi)
- Service ceiling: 16,300 ft (5,000 m)
- Rate of climb: 930 ft/min (4.7 m/s)
- Wing loading: 11.3 lb/sq ft (55 kg/m^{2})
