= Firewall Forward CAM 125 =

CAM 125
- Type: Piston aircraft engine
- National origin: Canada
- Manufacturer: Firewall Forward Aero Engines

The Firewall Forward CAM 125 is a 125 hp (93 kW) four-cylinder, four-stroke, liquid-cooled piston aircraft engine built by Firewall Forward Aero Engines. The engine is based on a Honda automotive piston engine.

== Applications ==
- Europa XS

== Specifications (CAM 125) ==
Data from World Directory of Leisure Aviation & Firewall Forward Aero Engines

=== General characteristics ===
- Type: Four-cylinder, four-stroke piston engine
- Bore: 75 mm (2.95 in)
- Stroke: 84.6 mm (3.33 in)
- Displacement: 1590 cm_{3} (97 cu in)
- Length: 33.25 inches (845 mm)
- Width: 21.5 inches (550 mm)
- Height: 23 inches (580 mm)
- Dry weight: 247 pounds (112 kg)

=== Components ===
- Valvetrain: Overhead camshaft
- Fuel type: 90 Octane petrol or 100LL aviation petrol
- Cooling system: Uses a water-glycol mixture with a camshaft belt driven water pump.
- Reduction gear: 2.4:1 reduction ratio (6,000 rpm engine, 2,500 rpm propeller).
- Starting system Electric gear reduction starter.

=== Performance ===
- Power output: 93.2 kW (125 hp) at propeller flange
- Specific power: 130 kW/L (1.28 hp/cu in)
- Compression ratio: 9.2:1
- Specific fuel consumption: 0.43 lb/bhp/hr at 70% power

== See also ==
Related development

- Firewall Forward CAM 100

Related lists

- List of aircraft engines
