= Aydlett A-1 =

Aydlett a-1

General information
- Type: Homebuilt single seat sports aircraft
- National origin: United States
- Designer: Donald E Aydlett
- Number built: 1

History
- First flight: 6 July 1965

The Aydlett A-1 was a one-off, homebuilt aircraft constructed in the US in the 1960s. It was a single seat, single engine monoplane of conventional appearance, with an enclosed cockpit.

== Design and development ==
Donald Aydlett began construction of the sole A-1 in 1963, flying it on 6 July 1965. It was a low wing monoplane of mixed wood and steel construction. The wing was a fabric covered wood structure, with streamlined lift struts from the upper fuselage longerons. The fuselage and tail unit were steel, again fabric covered, and the tail unit was wire braced. The tailplane was on top of the fuselage; the rounded fin carried a generous, unbalanced rudder. The cockpit, over the wing, was enclosed by a canopy which merged at the rear with the raised fuselage decking. Power came from a 125 hp (93 kW) flat four Lycoming O-290-G, mounted with cylinder heads and exhaust pipes exposed. The A-1 had a fixed, conventional undercarriage, with mainwheels mounted on faired V-struts and a tailwheel.

== Specifications ==
Data from Jane's All the World's Aircraft 1966/67

General characteristics

- Capacity: 1
- Length: 17 ft 0 in (5.18 m)
- Wingspan: 22 ft 3 in (6.78 m)
- Height: 6 ft 0 in (1.83 m)
- Empty weight: 690 lb (313 kg)
- Max takeoff weight: 1,200 lb (544 kg)
- Powerplant: 1 × Lycoming O-290-G 4-cylinder horizontally opposed, air cooled, 125 hp (93 kW)
- Propellers: 2-bladed fixed pitch

Performance

- Maximum speed: 185 mph (298 km/h, 161 kn)
- Cruise speed: 115 mph (185 km/h, 100 kn)
- Service ceiling: 15,000 ft (4,600 m) (service ceiling)
- Rate of climb: 1,000 ft/min (5.1 m/s) initial at sea level, minimum
