= Lycoming O-290 =

Aircraft engine family by Lycoming

O-290
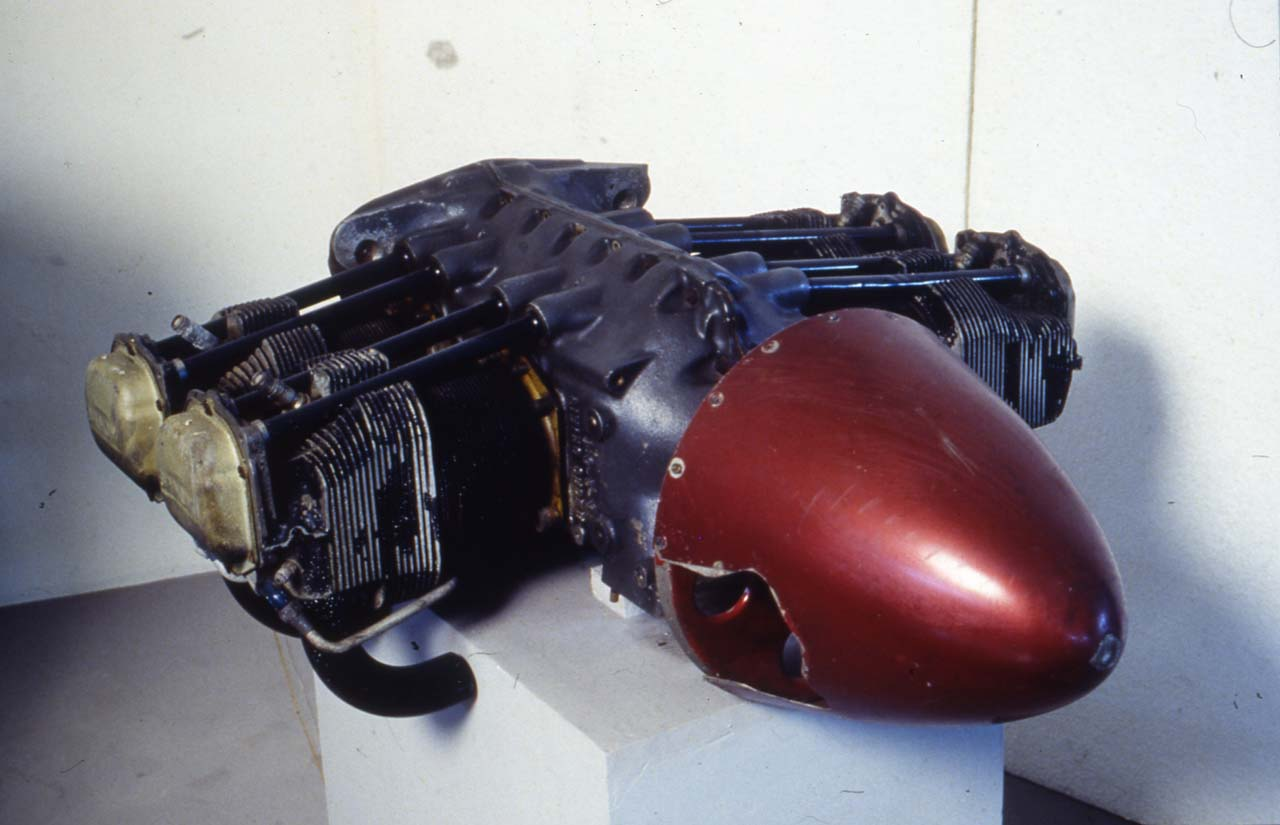
- Type: Piston aircraft engine
- National origin: United States
- Manufacturer: Lycoming Engines
- First run: 1939
- Major applications: Taylorcraft Auster IV; Taylorcraft Auster V; Ground Power Unit
- Manufactured: 1942–1975 out of production
- Developed into: Lycoming O-435

The Lycoming O-290 is a dual-ignition, four-cylinder, air-cooled, horizontally opposed aircraft engine. It was first run in 1939, and entered production three years later.

A common variant of the type is the O-290-G, a single-ignition model which was designed to drive a generator as part of a ground power unit.

== Variants ==
=== Civil models ===
O-290
Base model engine certified 27 July 1942. 125 hp (93 kW) at 2,450 rpm, 6.25:1 compression ratio, dry weight 244 lb (111 kg)
O-290-A
Certified 27 July 1942. 125 hp (93 kW) at 2,600 rpm continuous, 130 hp (97 kW) at 2,800 rpm for 5 minutes, 6.5:1 compression ratio, dry weight 251 lb (114 kg) with SR4L-8 or N-8 magnetos, 245 lb (111 kg) with N-20 or N-21 magnetos.
O-290-AP
Certified 21 July 1944. 125 hp (93 kW) at 2,600 rpm continuous, 130 hp (97 kW) at 2,800 rpm for 5 minutes, 6.5:1 compression ratio, dry weight 251 lb (114 kg) with SR4L-8 or N-8 magnetos, 245 lb (111 kg) with N-20 or N-21 magnetos.
O-290-B
Certified 22 January 1943. 125 hp (93 kW) at 2,600 rpm continuous, 130 hp (97 kW) at 2,800 rpm for 5 minutes, 6.5:1 compression ratio, dry weight 247 lb (112 kg).
O-290-C
Certified 22 January 1943. 125 hp (93 kW) at 2,600 rpm continuous, 130 hp (97 kW) at 2,800 rpm for 5 minutes, 6.5:1 compression ratio, dry weight 238 lb (108 kg).
O-290-CP
Certified 21 July 1944. 125 hp (93 kW) at 2,600 rpm continuous, 130 hp (97 kW) at 2,800 rpm for 5 minutes, 6.5:1 compression ratio, dry weight 238 lb (108 kg).
O-290-D
Certified 13 December 1949. 125 hp (93 kW) at 2,600 rpm continuous, 130 hp (97 kW) at 2,800 rpm for 5 minutes, 6.5:1 compression ratio, dry weight 230 lb (104 kg).
O-290-D2
Certified 1 May 1952. 135 hp (101 kW) at 2,600 rpm continuous, 140 hp (104 kW) at 2,800 rpm for 5 minutes, 7.5:1 compression ratio, dry weight 233 lb (106 kg).
O-290-D2A
Certified 20 April 1953. 135 hp (101 kW) at 2,600 rpm continuous, 140 hp (104 kW) at 2,800 rpm for 5 minutes, 7.5:1 compression ratio, dry weight 236 lb (107 kg).
O-290-D2B
Certified 30 September 1954. 135 hp (101 kW) at 2,600 rpm continuous, 140 hp (104 kW) at 2,800 rpm for 5 minutes, 7.0:1 compression ratio, dry weight 236 lb (107 kg).
O-290-D2C
Certified 8 May 1961. 135 hp (101 kW) at 2,600 rpm continuous, 140 hp (104 kW) at 2,800 rpm for 5 minutes, 7.0:1 compression ratio, dry weight 235 lb (107 kg).
O-290-G
Non-certified, single ignition model intended for use driving a generator in a ground power unit, 125 hp (93 kW). Has been widely used in homebuilt aircraft, including the prototype Van's Aircraft RV-3.

=== Military models ===
O-290-1
Identical to the O-290-B
O-290-3
Identical to the O-290-C
O-290-11
Identical to the O-290-D

== Applications ==
- Adkisson SJ-1 Head Skinner
- Aerocar
- Aero Commander 100
- Aquaflight Aqua I
- Aydlett A-1
- Boeing L-15 Scout
- Chrislea Super Ace
- Falconar F11 Sporty
- Firestone XR-9
- Flying K Sky Raider
- Grumman Kitten
- Isaacs Fury Mk II
- Mustang Aeronautics Midget Mustang
- Pazmany PL-1
- Pazmany PL-2
- Piper PA-12
- Piper PA-18 Super Cub
- Piper PA-20 Pacer
- Piper PA-22 TriPacer
- Rogers Sportaire
- Sea Teziutlán
- Seibel S-4
- Smyth Sidewinder
- Stolp Starduster
- Stout Skycar
- Taylorcraft Auster
- Thorp T-18
- Toyo T-T.10
- VanGrunsven RV-1
- Van Lith VI
- Van's Aircraft RV-3
- Warner Revolution II
- Warner Sportster
- Williams-Cangie WC-1 Sundancer

== Specifications (O-290-D2A) ==
Data from Operator's Manual, Textron Lycoming Aircraft Engines.

=== General characteristics ===
- Type: 4-cylinder air-cooled horizontally opposed piston aircraft engine
- Bore: 4.875 in (123.8 mm)
- Stroke: 3.875 in (98.4 mm)
- Displacement: 289 cu in (4.74 L)
- Dry weight: 264 lb (119.7 kg)

=== Components ===
- Valvetrain: Pushrod-actuated valves
- Fuel system: Carburetor
- Cooling system: Air-cooled

=== Performance ===
- Power output: 140 hp (104 kW) at 2,800 rpm
- Specific power: 0.48 hp/in^{3} (22.2 kW/L)
- Compression ratio: 7.5:1

== See also ==
Comparable engines

- de Havilland Gipsy Major

Related lists

- List of aircraft engines
