= Warner Revolution I =

American homebuilt aircraft

Revolution I
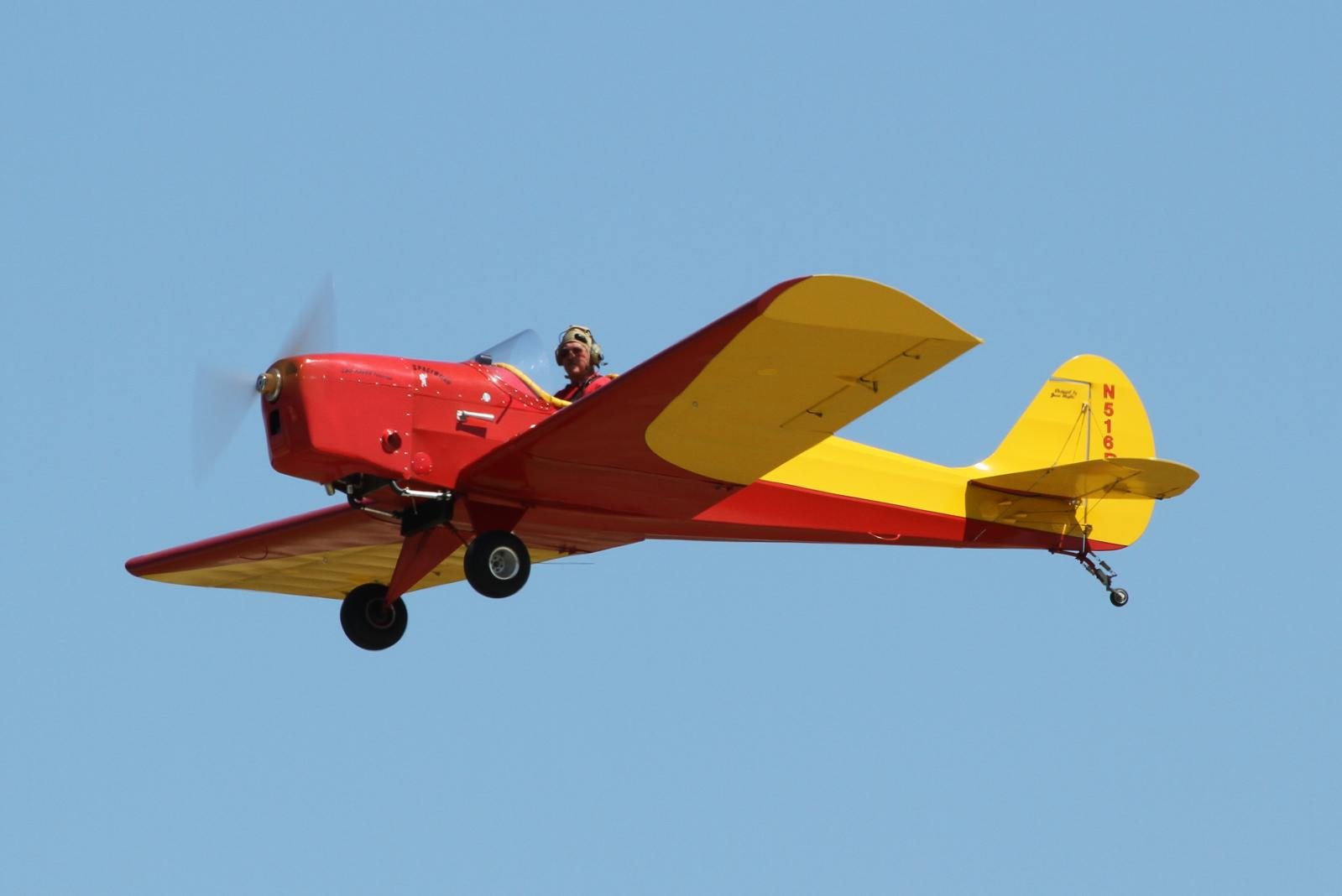
- Warner Aerocraft Spacewalker 1

General information
- Type: Homebuilt aircraft
- National origin: United States
- Manufacturer: Warner Aerocraft
- Status: Production completed
- Number built: At least three

History
- Variant: Warner Revolution II

The Warner Revolution I, also marketed as the Spacewalker I, is an American homebuilt aircraft that was designed and produced by Warner Aerocraft of Seminole, Florida. When it was available the aircraft was supplied as a kit or in the form of plans for amateur construction.

The aircraft is intended to be reminiscent of the open cockpit monoplanes of the 1930s, such as the Ryan ST.

== Design and development ==
The Revolution I features a cantilever low-wing, a single-seat, open cockpit with a windshield, fixed conventional landing gear with wheel pants and a single engine in tractor configuration.

The aircraft is made from a combination of wood and metal tubing, covered in doped aircraft fabric. Its 26.00 ft (7.9 m) span wing lacks flaps. The standard engine used is the 65 hp (48 kW) Continental A65 powerplant. The aircraft has a typical empty weight of 540 lb (240 kg) and a gross weight of 840 lb (380 kg), giving a useful load of 300 lb (140 kg).

The Revolution I was later developed into a two-seat model called the Warner Revolution II.

== Operational history ==
In May 2014 two examples were registered in the United States with the Federal Aviation Administration, although a total of three had been registered at one time.

== Specifications (Revolution I) ==
Data from AeroCrafter

General characteristics

- Crew: one
- Length: 18 ft 0 in (5.49 m)
- Wingspan: 26 ft 0 in (7.92 m)
- Empty weight: 540 lb (245 kg)
- Gross weight: 840 lb (381 kg)
- Powerplant: 1 × Continental A65 four cylinder, air-cooled, four stroke aircraft engine, 65 hp (48 kW)
- Propellers: 2-bladed wooden, fixed pitch

Performance

- Maximum speed: 125 mph (201 km/h, 109 kn)
- Cruise speed: 100 mph (160 km/h, 87 kn)
- Stall speed: 45 mph (72 km/h, 39 kn)
- Range: 300 mi (480 km, 260 nmi)
- Service ceiling: 14,000 ft (4,300 m)
- Rate of climb: 900 ft/min (4.6 m/s)
