= Firestone XR-9 =

1940s American experimental helicopter

XR-9
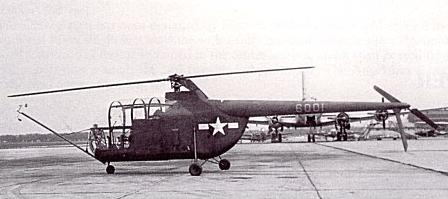

General information
- Type: Utility helicopter
- Manufacturer: Firestone Aircraft Company
- Primary user: United States Army Air Forces
- Number built: 2

History
- First flight: March 1946

The Firestone XR-9, also known by the company designation Model 45, is a 1940s American experimental helicopter built by the Firestone Aircraft Company for the United States Army Air Forces. Only two (the military XR-9B and one civil example) were built.

== Development ==
Originally developed by G & A Aircraft with the co-operation of the United States Army Air Forces' Air Technical Service Command, the G & A Model 45B (designated XR-9 Rotocycle by the Army) was a design for a single-seat helicopter of pod-and-boom configuration. It had a fixed tri-cycle landing gear and three-bladed main and tail rotors. Power would have been supplied by a 126 hp (94 kW) Avco Lycoming XO-290-5 engine. The Model 45C (XR-9A) was the same helicopter with a two-bladed rotor. Neither of the two helicopters were built. G & A Aircraft was purchased by Firestone in 1943, and was renamed the Firestone Aircraft Company in 1946.

A revised two-seat design the revised Model 45C (or XR-9B) was built with a three-bladed main rotor and two-seat in tandem. The first aircraft procured by the Army Air Forces in 1946, it was powered by an Avco Lycoming O-290-7 engine and first flew in March of that year.

A civil version, the Model 45D was also built and flown, in anticipation of a postwar boom in aircraft sales. This differed in having the two occupants side-by-side instead of tandem as in the 45C, and was equipped with a 150 horsepower (110 kW) Lycoming engine. The prototype was demonstrated at the 1946 Cleveland National Air Races. A four-seat Model 50, with twin tail rotors, was also projected, but the predicted sales boom did not materialise, and Firestone closed its aircraft manufacturing division.

== Variants ==
Model 45B
Unbuilt single-seat helicopter with three-bladed rotor, Army designation XR-9.
Model 45C
Unbuilt single-seat helicopter with two-bladed rotor, Army designation XR-9A.
Model 45C (revised)
Tandem two-seat helicopter powered by an Avco Lycoming O-290-7 engine and two-bladed rotor, one built as the XR-9B, later re-designated the XH-9B.
Model 45D
Side-by-side two-seat helicopter for civil market, one built.
Model 50.
Four-seat version, not built.
XR-9
Army designation for the unbuilt Model 45B
XR-9A
Army designation for the unbuilt Model 45C
XR-9B
Army designation for the Model 45C (revised), later redesignated XH-9B
XH-9B
XR-9B re-designated in 1948.

== Operators ==
United States
United States Army Air Forces

== Survivors ==
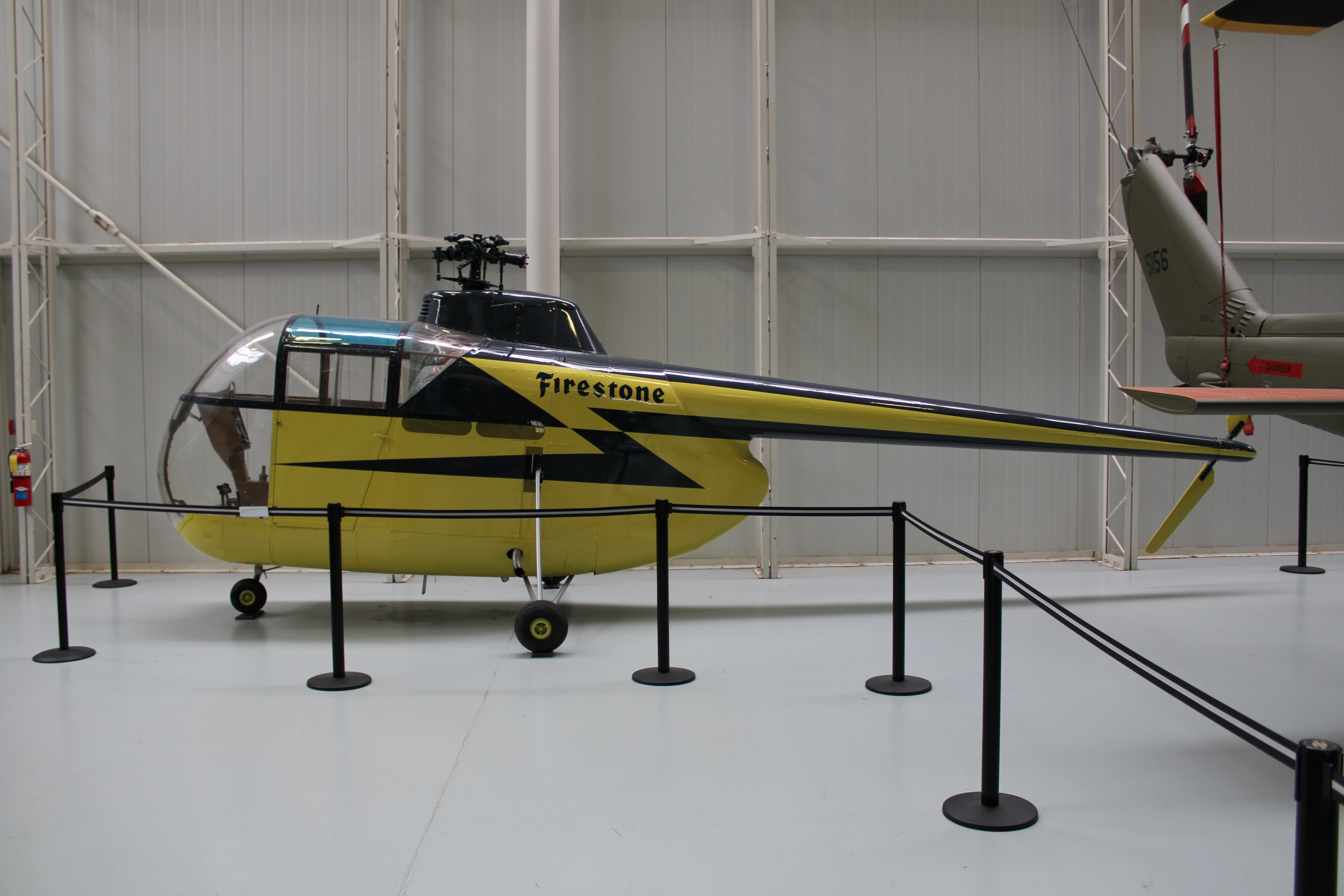
Firestone Model 45D at the United States Army Aviation Museum

The sole Model 45D is on display (without blades installed) at the United States Army Aviation Museum at Fort Rucker, Alabama.

== Specifications (XR-9B) ==
Data from Jane's all the World's Aircraft 1947,

General characteristics

- Crew: 1
- Capacity: 1 pax
- Length: 27 ft 7 in (8.4 m)
- Height: 8 ft 6 in (2.6 m)
- Gross weight: 1,750 lb (794 kg)
- Fuel capacity: 25 US gal (21 imp gal; 95 L) 80 Octane fuel
- Powerplant: 1 × Lycoming O-290-7 4-cyl. horizontally-opposed air-cooled piston engine, 135 hp (101 kW)
- Main rotor diameter: 28 ft 0 in (8.53 m)

Performance

- Maximum speed: 100 mph (160 km/h, 87 kn)
- Cruise speed: 80 mph (130 km/h, 70 kn)
- Service ceiling: 10,000 ft (3,000 m)
- Rate of climb: 1,000 ft/min (5.1 m/s)

== See also ==
Related lists

- List of military aircraft of the United States
