= Warner Revolution II =

American homebuilt aircraft

Revolution II
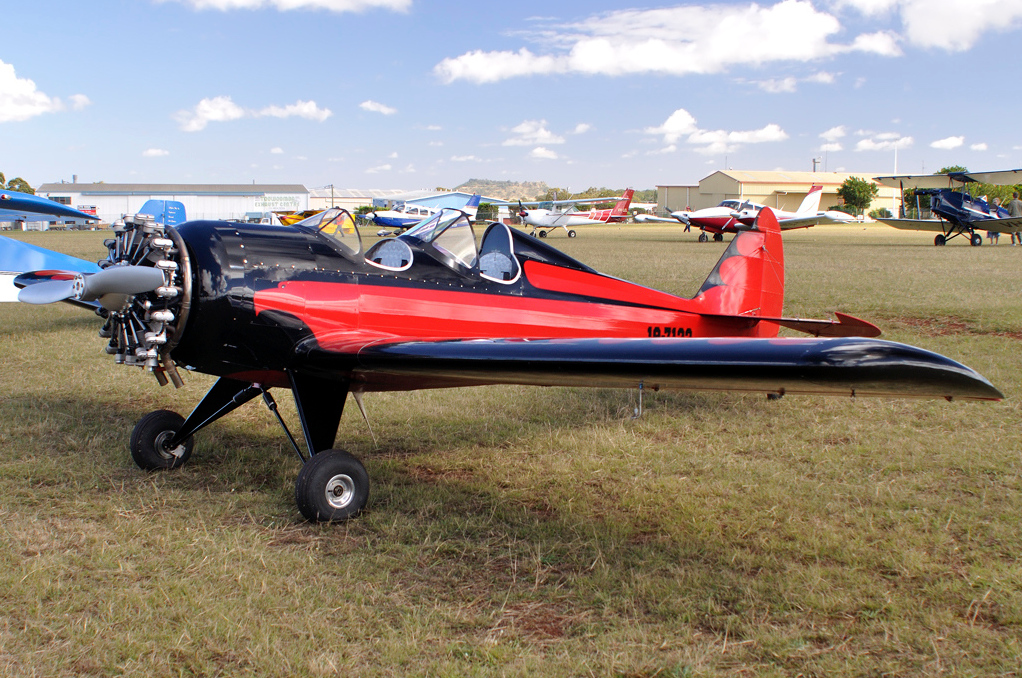
- A Warner Revolution II equipped with a radial engine

General information
- Type: Homebuilt aircraft
- National origin: United States
- Manufacturer: Warner Aerocraft
- Status: Production completed
- Number built: At least 30

History
- Developed from: Warner Revolution I

The Warner Revolution II, also marketed as the Space Walker II, is an American homebuilt aircraft that was designed and produced by Warner Aerocraft of Seminole, Florida. When it was available the aircraft was supplied as a kit or in the form of plans for amateur construction.

The aircraft is intended to be reminiscent of the open cockpit monoplanes of the 1930s, such as the Ryan ST.

== Design and development ==
Developed from the single-seat Warner Revolution I, the Revolution II features a cantilever low wing, a two-seat tandem open cockpit with dual windshields, fixed conventional landing gear with wheel pants and a single engine in tractor configuration.

The aircraft is made from a combination of wood and metal tubing, covered in doped aircraft fabric. Its 28.00 ft (8.5 m) span wing lacks flaps and has a wing area of 126.0 sq ft (11.71 m^{2}). The acceptable power range is 85 to 160 hp (63 to 119 kW) and the standard engines used are the 125 hp (93 kW) Continental O-240 or the 125 hp (93 kW) Lycoming O-290 powerplants.

The Revolution II has a typical empty weight of 800 lb (360 kg) and a gross weight of 1,400 lb (640 kg), giving a useful load of 600 lb (270 kg). With full fuel of 17 U.S. gallons (64 L; 14 imp gal) the payload for the pilot, passenger and baggage is 498 lb (226 kg).

The standard day, sea level, no wind takeoff with a 125 hp (93 kW) engine is 400 ft (122 m) and the landing roll is 450 ft (137 m).

== Operational history ==
In May 2014, 19 examples were registered in the United States with the Federal Aviation Administration, although a total of 30 had been registered at one time.

== Specifications (Revolution II) ==
Data from AeroCrafter

General characteristics

- Crew: one
- Capacity: one passenger
- Length: 19 ft 8 in (5.99 m)
- Wingspan: 28 ft 0 in (8.53 m)
- Wing area: 126.0 sq ft (11.71 m^{2})
- Empty weight: 800 lb (363 kg)
- Gross weight: 1,400 lb (635 kg)
- Fuel capacity: 17 U.S. gallons (64 L; 14 imp gal)
- Powerplant: 1 × Lycoming O-290 four cylinder, air-cooled, four stroke aircraft engine, 125 hp (93 kW)
- Propellers: 2-bladed metal, fixed pitch

Performance

- Cruise speed: 115 mph (185 km/h, 100 kn)
- Stall speed: 42 mph (68 km/h, 36 kn)
- Never exceed speed: 160 mph (260 km/h, 140 kn)
- Range: 300 mi (480 km, 260 nmi)
- Service ceiling: 14,000 ft (4,300 m)
- Rate of climb: 1,200 ft/min (6.1 m/s)
- Wing loading: 11.1 lb/sq ft (54 kg/m^{2})
