= Ryan ST =

American light airplane

Ryan ST series
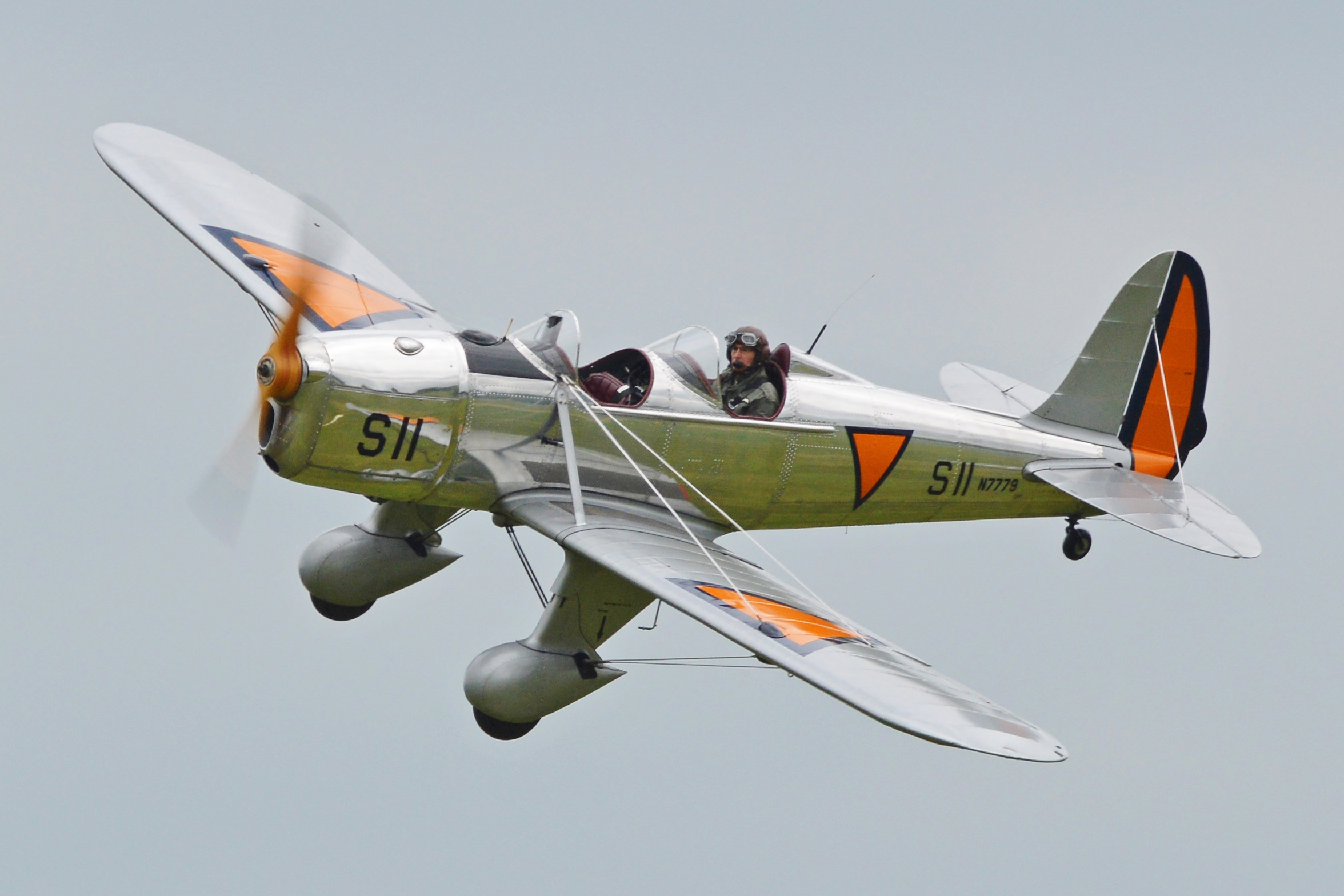
- A restored Ryan ST-A Special

General information
- Type: Monoplane Trainer
- Manufacturer: Ryan Aeronautical Company
- Designer: T. Claude Ryan
- Status: Production completed
- Primary users: United States Army Air Forces Netherlands East Indies Army and Navy; Royal Australian Air Force
- Number built: 1,568

History
- Introduction date: 1934
- First flight: 8 June 1934
- Variant: Ryan PT-22 Recruit

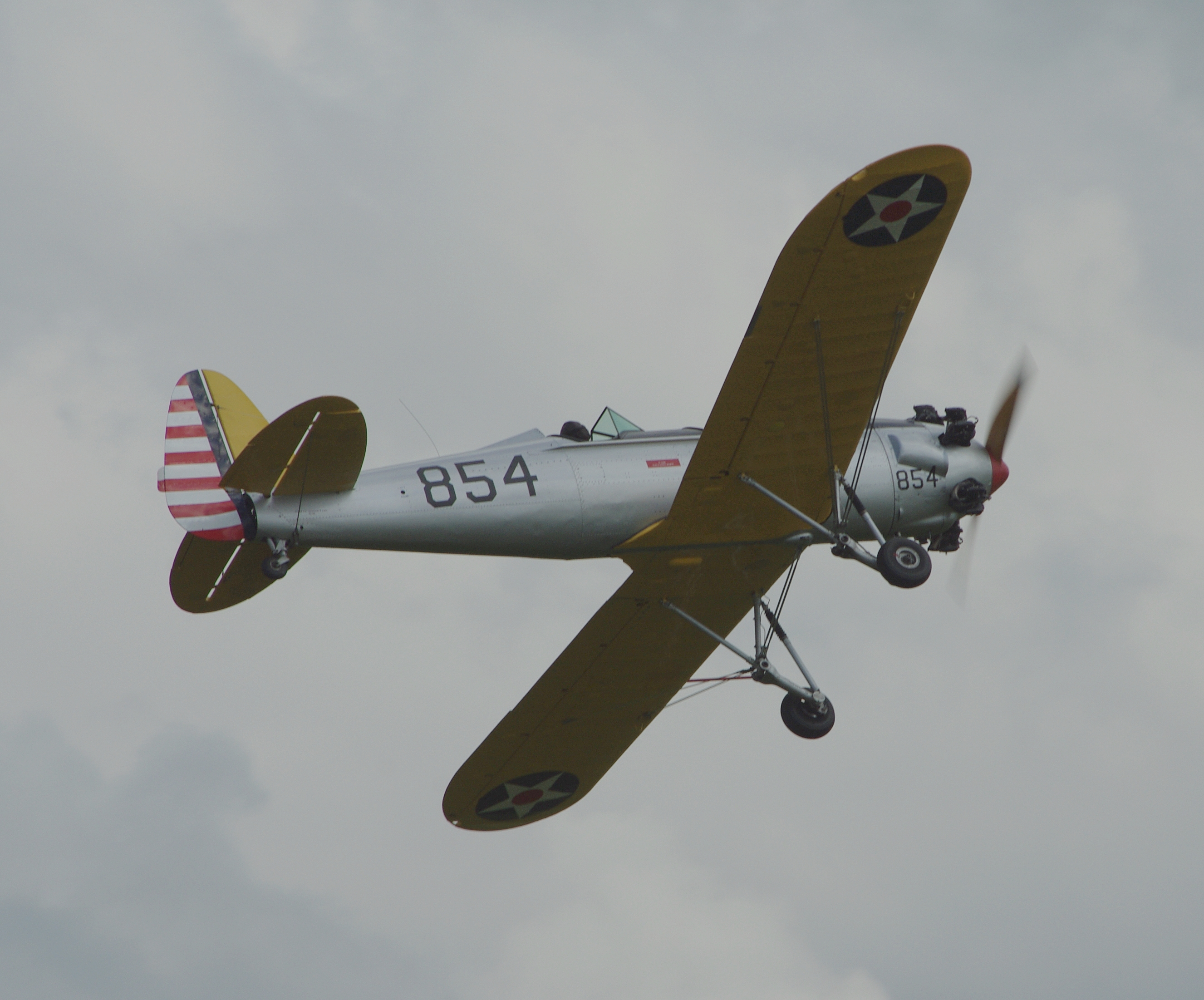
Ryan PT-22 Recruit at Old Warden 2009

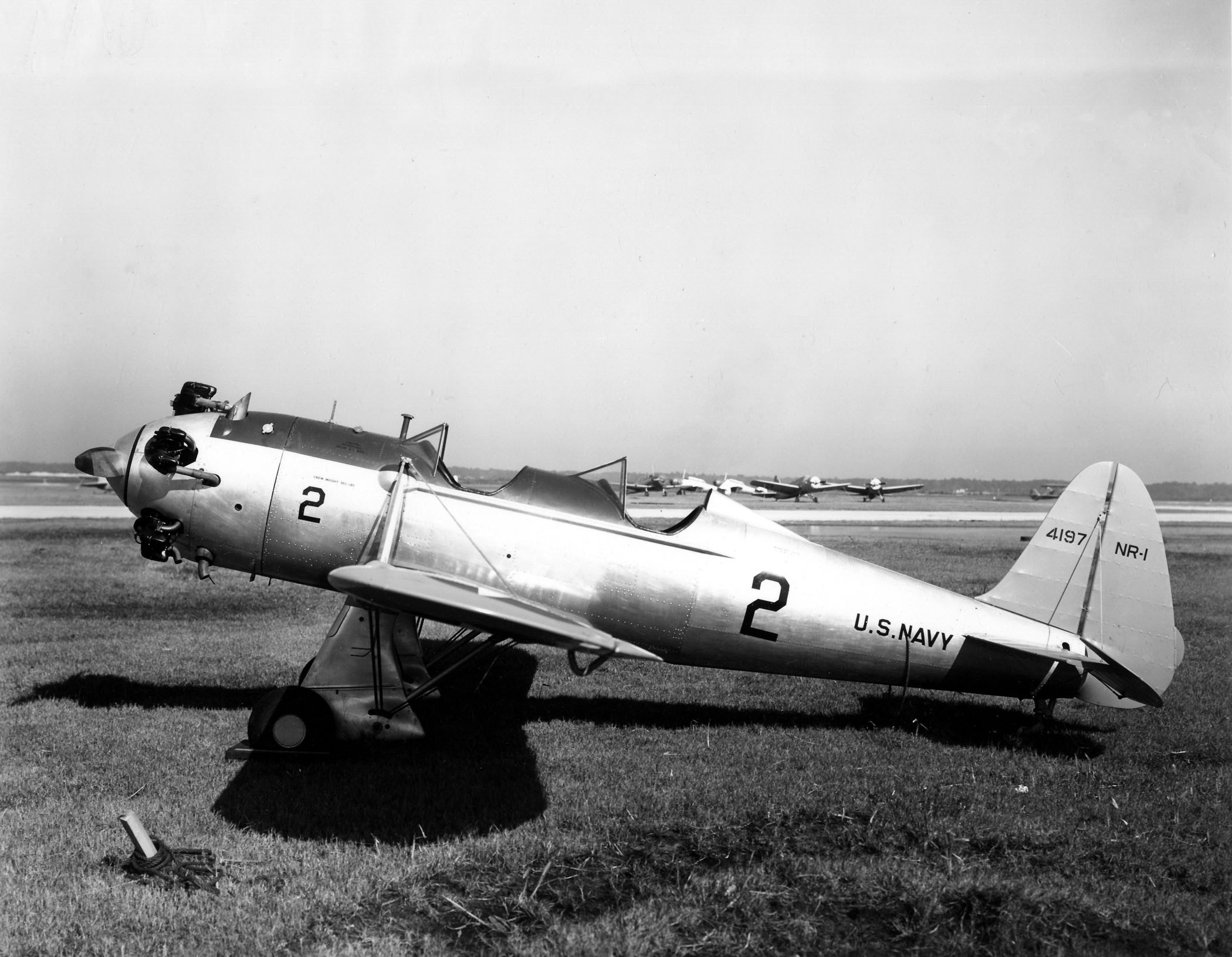
A U.S. Navy Ryan NR-1 at NAS Jacksonville, 1942.

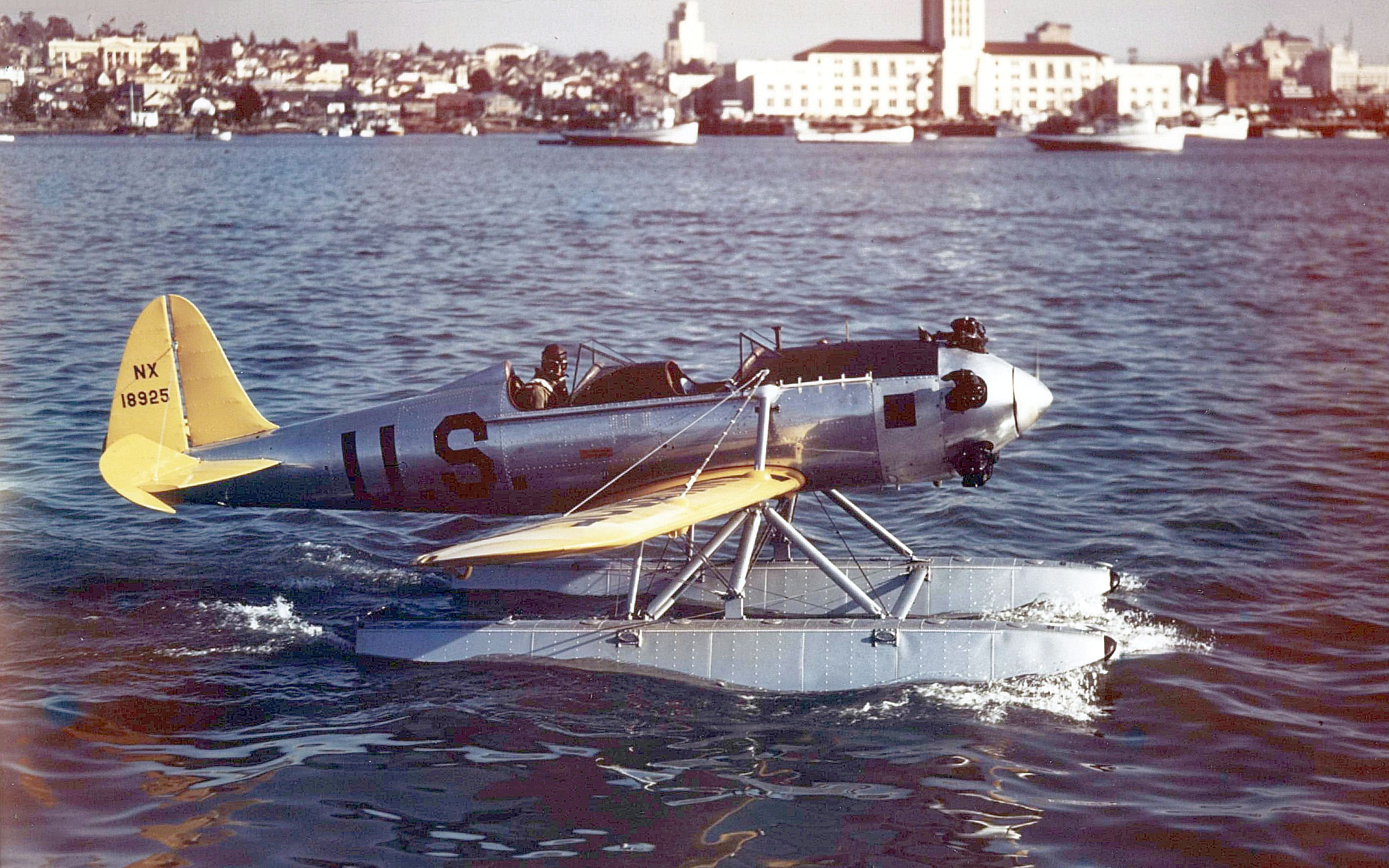
Ryan ST-3 floatplane in San Diego Bay, circa 1950.

The Ryan STs are a series of two seat, low-wing monoplane aircraft built in the United States by the Ryan Aeronautical Company. They were used as sport aircraft, as well as trainers by flying schools and the militaries of several countries.

== Design and development ==
T. Claude Ryan was the founder of the Ryan Aeronautical Company, the second incarnation of a company with this name, and the fourth company with which he had been involved to bear his name (the first, Ryan Airlines, was the manufacturer of the Ryan NYP, more famously known as the Spirit of St. Louis). He began the development of the ST (for "Sport Trainer", and also known as S-T), the first design of the company, in 1933.

The ST featured two open cockpits in tandem in a semi-monocoque metal fuselage of two main frames – one steel, the other half of steel and half of aluminium alloy (alclad) – to take the loads from the wing spars and six more alclad frames; and alclad skin. It had wings in three sections of hybrid construction; the center section integral with the fuselage had tubular steel spars, the front spar a simple tube with an external brace to the upper fuselage, and the rear spar in the form of a parallel chord truss. The two outer wing panels had wooden spars and alclad ribs, with diagonal rods bracing the wings internally. Alclad sheet was used to form the leading edges, and fabric covered the whole structure. When attached, the outer wings were braced with flying wires to the fixed conventional landing gear and landing wires to the upper fuselage.

The fuselage only required eight bulkheads, and no longerons or stringers were required. According to Cassagneres, "The stressed skin, of heavy 18 and 20 gauge 24ST Alclad, was riveted to the drop-hammer formed dural bulkhead rings." The main fuselage bulkhead, "was of built-up welded sheet steel and carried the important spar fittings as well as attachment points for the diagonal wing bracing strut, the upper landing wires, and lower flying wires." Cassagneres goes on to state, "The wings were constructed of solid spruce spars, stamped aluminum alloy ribs, and steel compression members, and were fabric covered. Ailerons and flaps were steel and aluminum structure with fabric covering. All tail surfaces were constructed entirely of tubular aluminum alloy with stamped ribs, and fabric covered."

Five STs were built, each powered with a 95HP Menasco B4 engine before the follow-on ST-A (A for Aerobatic) was developed with a more powerful 125HP Menasco C4 engine. A single ST-B was produced, this being an ST-A with only one seat and an extra fuel tank where the front cockpit normally was; this aircraft was subsequently converted back to ST-A standard. The ST-A was further developed as the ST-A Special, with a super-charged 150HP Menasco C4-S engine of increased power.

In 1937 the ST-A Special was developed into a military version, the STM (also ST-M) series. The first STMs were virtually identical to the STA-Special. The STM-2 was derived from the STM with changes including wider cockpits to enable military pilots to enter and exit while wearing parachutes, external stringers, and provision for a machine gun on some examples. The military also required a turnover brace and a hand-cranked intertia engine starter. Variants, designated the PT-16s and PT-20s, also had their wheel pants, fairings and tail cones removed. Variants in the series included the STM-2P single-seat version armed with a machine gun delivered to Nationalist China; and the STM-S2, which could be fitted with landing gear or with EDO Model 1965 floats.

After the ST-M came the ST-3, a substantial redesign in 1941 partly brought about by the unreliability of the Menasco engines fitted to STs to that point. The United States Army Air Corps (USAAC) had purchased several dozen ST-M variants under various designations and had Ryan Aeronautical re-engine most with Kinner R-440 radial engines. The USAAC found the modification to be beneficial and asked Ryan Aeronautical to design a variant with this engine as standard, and with airframe modifications considered desirable from in-service experience. The ST-3 that resulted featured a longer and more circular wider fuselage, this being suggested by the circular radial engine. Other changes included a revised rudder, balanced ailerons and elevators, and strengthened main landing gear with the legs spaced further apart. The streamlining spats covering the mainwheels, found on ST series aircraft to that point, were deleted as well. The ST-3 served as the basis for military versions ordered by the USAAC and the United States Navy (USN).

The ST-3 gave rise to another model developed in 1941 and early 1942, this was the ST-3KR (for Kinner Radial). The ST-3KR had a more powerful Kinner R-5 engine fitted and became the definitive model; more than 1,000 military versions were built during World War II as PT-22 Recruits. According to Cassagneres, "The only noticeable difference between the PT-21 and PT-22 was the metal landing gear fairings which covered the main gear structure, leaving the wheels exposed. Otherwise the airframe and its parts and components were interchangeable with the PT-22. One other difference from the later 22 model is in the aileron balance ring. On the 21 it is mounted below the aileron and on the 22 it's on top." The final variant was the ST-4, which was a version of the ST-3 with a wooden fuselage, developed in case a shortage of "strategic materials" (i.e. of metal) developed. Such a shortage did not eventuate and the ST-4 was not put into mass-production.

Some U.S. Navy versions of the ST-3, the NR-1, were converted to specialized ground trainers to teach cadets how to taxi aircraft when on the ground or after landing, and especially in crosswinds. The main wing was clipped back to the landing gear; a small nose wheel added to prevent ground loops; a roll cage between cockpits to protect the pilot and cadet; and the throttle modified so the engine could not go over a certain RPM.

The first Ryan ST flew for the first time on 8 June 1934 and production began the following year, when nine aircraft were delivered. Except for 1937 (when 46 aircraft were built), production rates remained low for several years, at about one aircraft every two weeks. This changed in 1940 when deliveries to military forces began in earnest; production that year was just under three aircraft per week. Total production of civil and military aircraft prior to the entry of the United States into World War II amounted to 315. Another 1,253 military versions were produced in 1942 and 1943, for a total of 1,568 aircraft of all models.

== Operational history ==
Most civil aircraft in the ST series were delivered in the United States, although a few were exported to South Africa, Australia and various countries in Latin America. An example of the ST-A was procured by the USAAC in 1939 for evaluation as the XPT-16. This was followed by 15 YPT-16s, the first time the USAAC had ordered a monoplane trainer. These were the first of more than 1,000 Ryan STs to serve the USAAC, its successor, the United States Army Air Forces (USAAF) and the USN.

A large number of STMs were exported in the 1930s and early 1940s (prior to the entry of the United States into World War II) to various air forces, with the biggest customer being the military of the Netherlands East Indies, now Indonesia. The Netherlands East Indies Army and Navy took delivery of 84 STM-2s and 24 STM-S2s in 1940 and early 1941. (Note: Orphan is in disagreement with the other sources. In the article, "The Ryan ST in Australia", he quotes different numbers to each arm and a different mix of the two types (60 STM-2s to the NEI Army and 48 STM-S2s to the NEI Navy) but the same overall number of deliveries.) Another 50 STM-2Es and STM-2Ps were exported to Nationalist China, while a number of STMs were exported to Bolivia, Ecuador, Guatemala, Honduras, Mexico and Nicaragua. The STM was chosen by the South American Air-forces because of the superior performance of the super-charged Menasco engine at the high altitude airports encountered.

After the Japanese invasion of the Netherlands East Indies many Ryans in that country were pressed into combat, especially in reconnaissance roles, and large numbers were shot down or destroyed on the ground. Surviving STM-2s and STM-S2s that were not captured by the Japanese were shipped to Australia, where 34 entered service in the Royal Australian Air Force as trainers. Many of those that survived until the end of World War II were then placed on the civil register in Australia and elsewhere, and some are still flying more than 70 years after they were built.

== Variants ==
=== Manufacturer designations ===
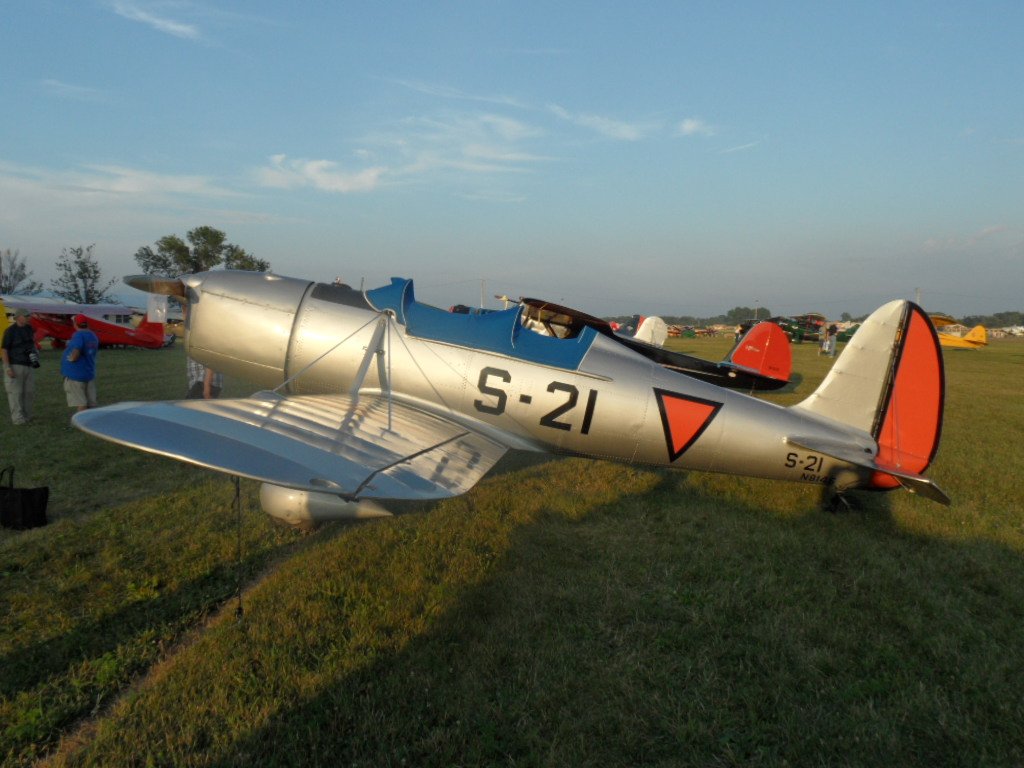
Ryan STM-S2 with Netherlands East Indies markings during AirVenture 2011

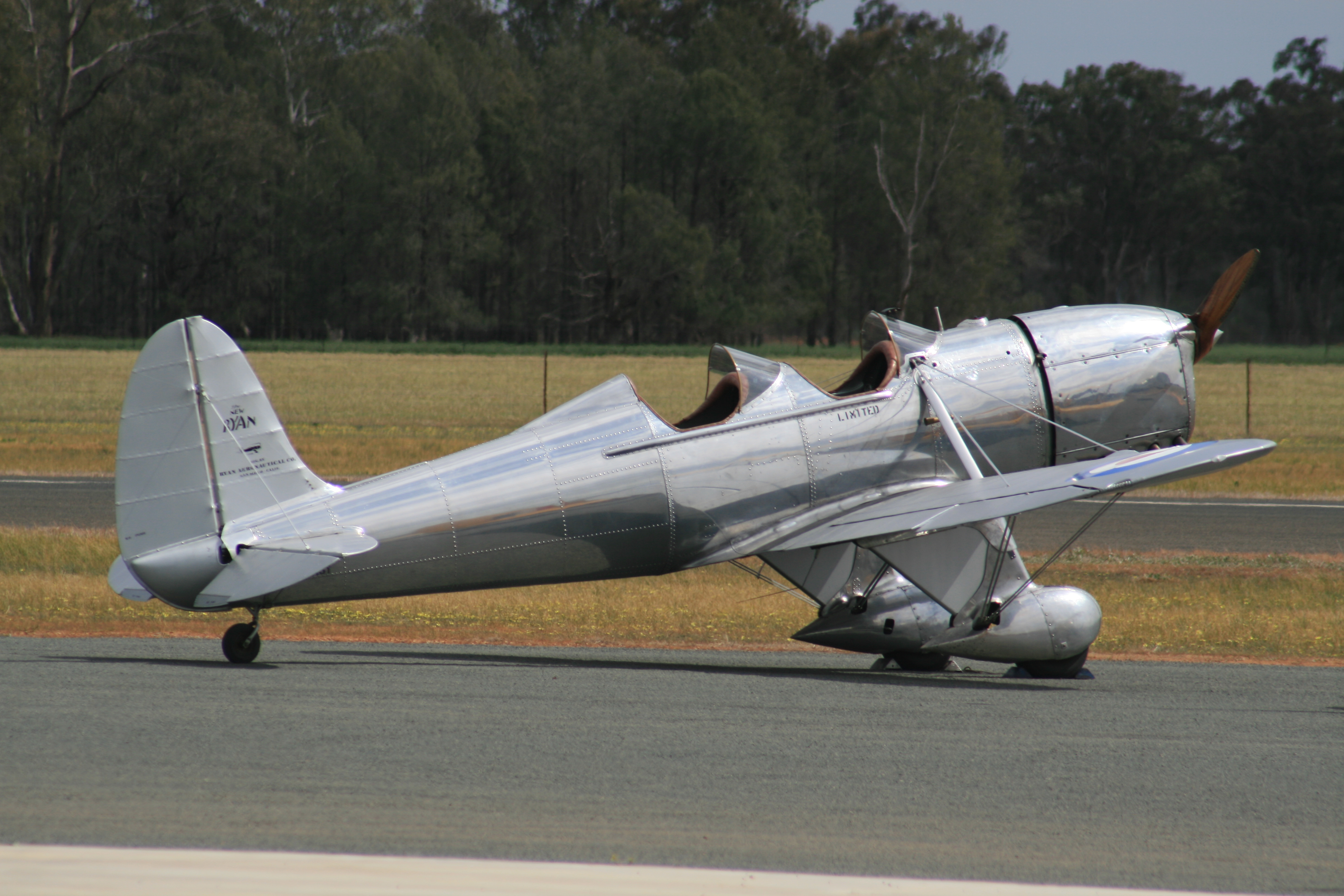
A surviving Ryan STM-S2 in Australia, showing the larger cockpit openings and external stringers unique to the STM-2

ST
Prototype and first model, fitted with a Menasco B4 engine of 95 hp; five built.
ST-A
Improved ST designed for aerobatics, fitted with a Menasco C4 engine of 125 hp; 73 built.
ST-A Special
Improved ST-A, fitted with a super-charged Menasco C4S engine of 150 hp; 10 built.
ST-B
Single-seat variant of ST-A with extra fuel tank in place of front cockpit; one built, later converted to ST-A.
STM
Military version of ST-A Special, some with provision for a machine gun; 22 built for various South American air-forces.
STM-2
Variant of STM for Netherlands East Indies Army and Navy; 95 built.
STM-2E
Variant of STM delivered to China, fitted with a Menasco C4S2 engine of 165 hp; 48 built.
STM-2P
Single-seat variant of the STM-2E with provision for a machine gun, also delivered to China; 2 built.
STM-S2
Variant of STM-2 with interchangeable wheel landing gear or floats for Netherlands East Indies Navy; 13 built.
ST-W
Experimental conversions, with a Warner Scarab radial engine; one converted from USAAC YPT-16 with Scarab of 125 hp; one converted from USAAC PT-20A with Super Scarab of 160 hp.
ST-3
Variant with new fuselage shape and a Kinner B-5 radial engine of 125 hp; one built.
ST-3KR
Variant of ST-3 with a Kinner R-5 radial engine of 160 hp, one built.
ST-4
Variant of ST-3 manufactured with wooden fuselage; one built.

=== US military designations ===
==== USAAC/USAAF ====
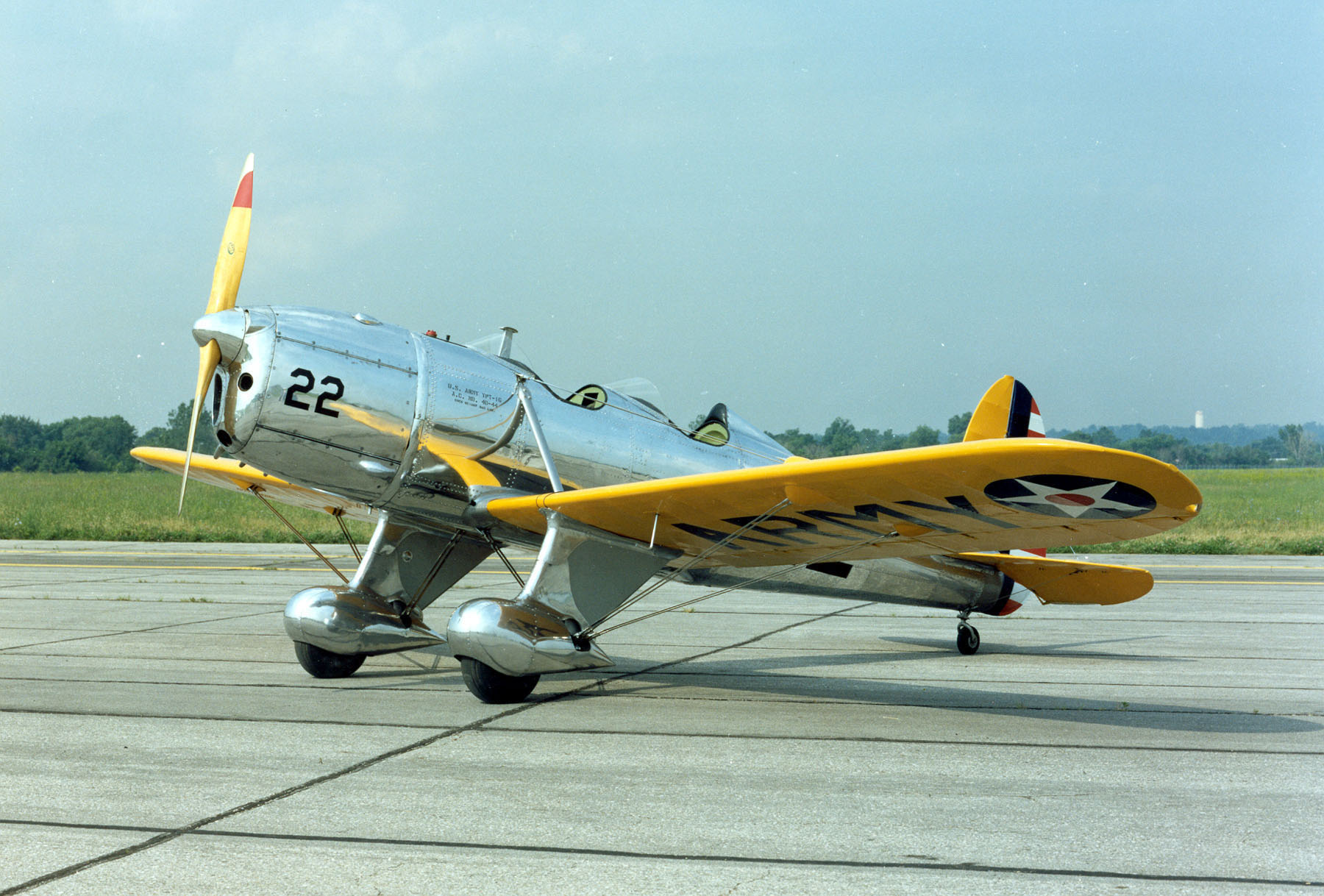
Ryan YPT-16

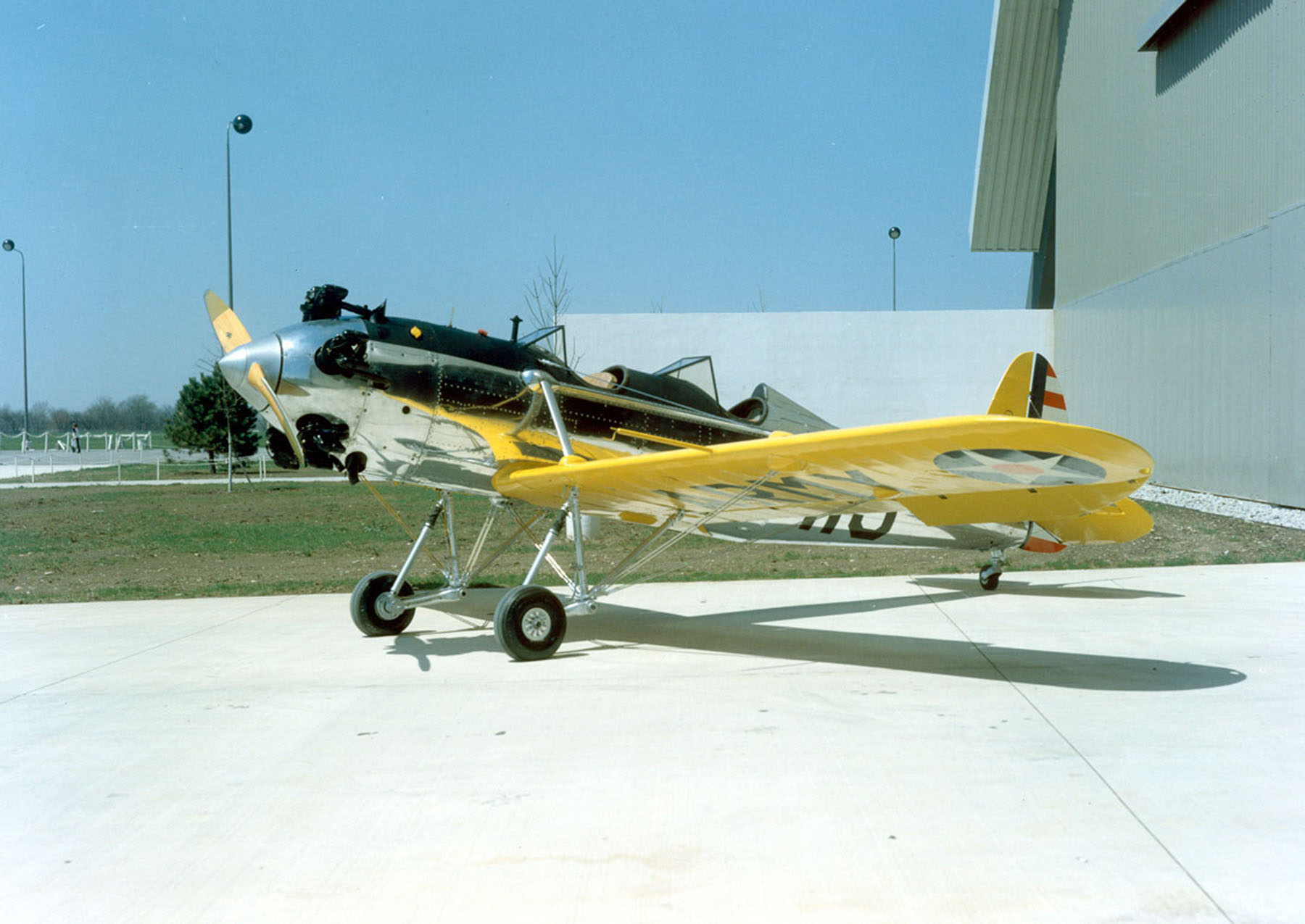
Ryan PT-22 Recruit

PT-16

- XPT-16: A single ST-A bought by the USAAC for evaluation.
- XPT-16A: XPT-16 re-engined with Kinner R-440 radial engine of 125 hp.
- YPT-16: A total of 15 aircraft similar to the ST-M ordered for service trials.
- PT-16A: 14 YPT-16s re-engined with Kinner R-440 engine.

PT-20
Production version of PT-16; 30 built.

- PT-20A: Designation of PT-20s that were re-engined with Kinner R-440 engines.

PT-21
Military production version of ST-3; 100 built.
PT-22 Recruit
Military production version of ST-3KR with Kinner R-540-1 engine; 1,048 built, including PT-22As.

- PT-22A: Designation for 25 examples of ST-3KR built for the Royal Netherlands Air Force but not delivered, aircraft subsequently taken by the USAAF.
- PT-22C: Aircraft re-engined with Kinner R-540-3 engines, 250 aircraft modified.

YPT-25
Military version of ST-4, ordered for evaluation; five built.

==== USN ====
NR-1
Naval production version of ST-3; 100 built.

== Operators ==
Numbers used from World Air Forces

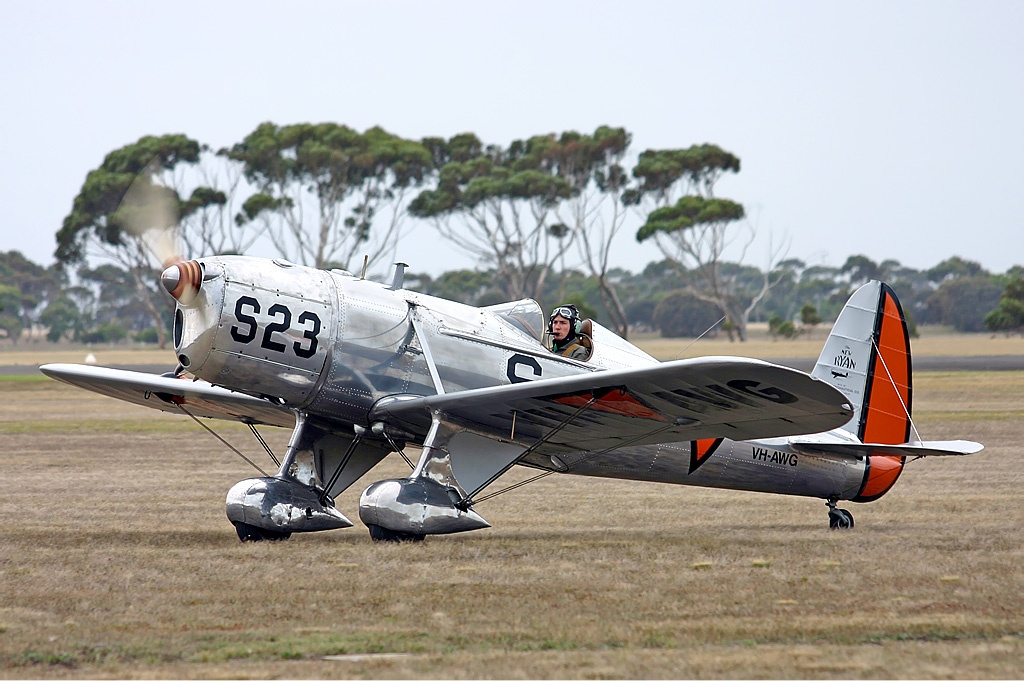
Surviving STM-S2 in Australia (2006).

Australia

- Royal Australian Air Force operated 34 ex-Netherlands examples that had escaped capture by the Japanese from 1942 to 1945

Bolivia

- Bolivian Air Force operated one from 1939 to 1944

China

- Republic of China Air Force operated 120 from 1940 to 1942

Ecuador

- Ecuadorian Air Force operated 10 from 1941

Guatemala

- Guatemalan Air Force operated 12 STA specials from 1938 to 1958

Honduras

- Honduran Air Force operated three STA specials from 1938 to 1943

Japan

- Imperial Japanese Army Air Service operated an unknown number captured from the Netherlands

Mexico

- Mexican Air Force operated six STA specials from 1937 to 1947

Netherlands East Indies

- Royal Netherlands East Indies Army Air Force operated 60 STM-2/STM-S2 from 1940 to 1942
- Royal Netherlands Navy operated 48 STM-2/STM-S2s from 1941 to 1942

Nicaragua

- Nicaraguan Air Force operated one STA special during 1938

South Africa

- South African Air Force operated three from 1939

United States

- United States Army Air Corps and United States Army Air Forces operated 1,224 of all versions from 1939 until 1946
- United States Navy operated 100 NR-1s (PT-22) from 1940 until 1944

== Surviving aircraft ==
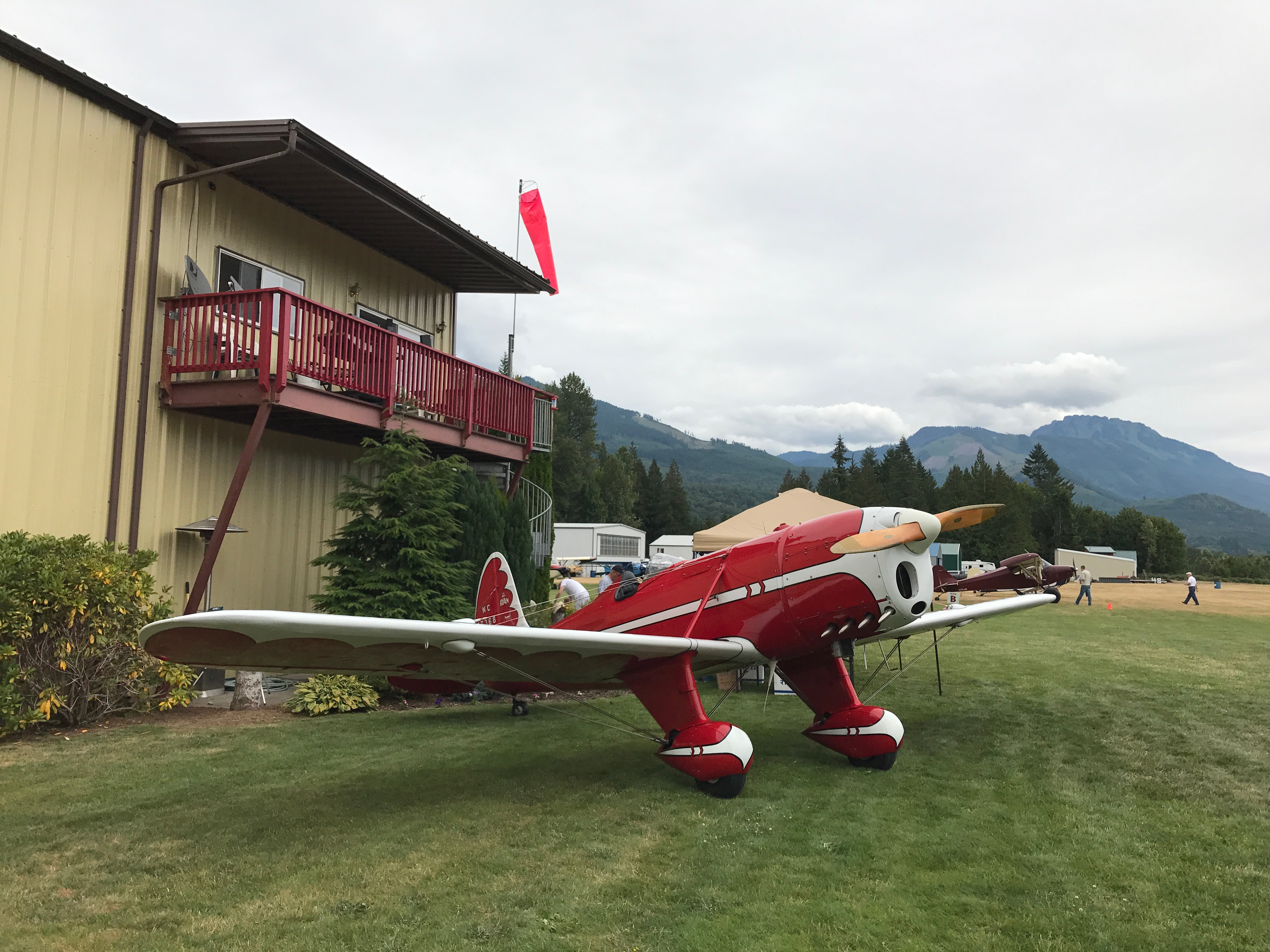
An example of a restored Ryan STA-Special. This specific plane is now on display at WAAAM in Hood River Oregon.

There are a number of surviving Ryan ST series aircraft remaining. The survivors range from project aircraft in various stages of completion to restored flying examples. There are remaining examples of the ST, STA, STA-Special, STM, STM-2 and PT20. Many of these restored examples have had their Menasco C4 engines replaced with Menasco D4-87 engines. This change was often because of the shortage of parts available for the C4 engine.

== Specifications (ST-A) ==
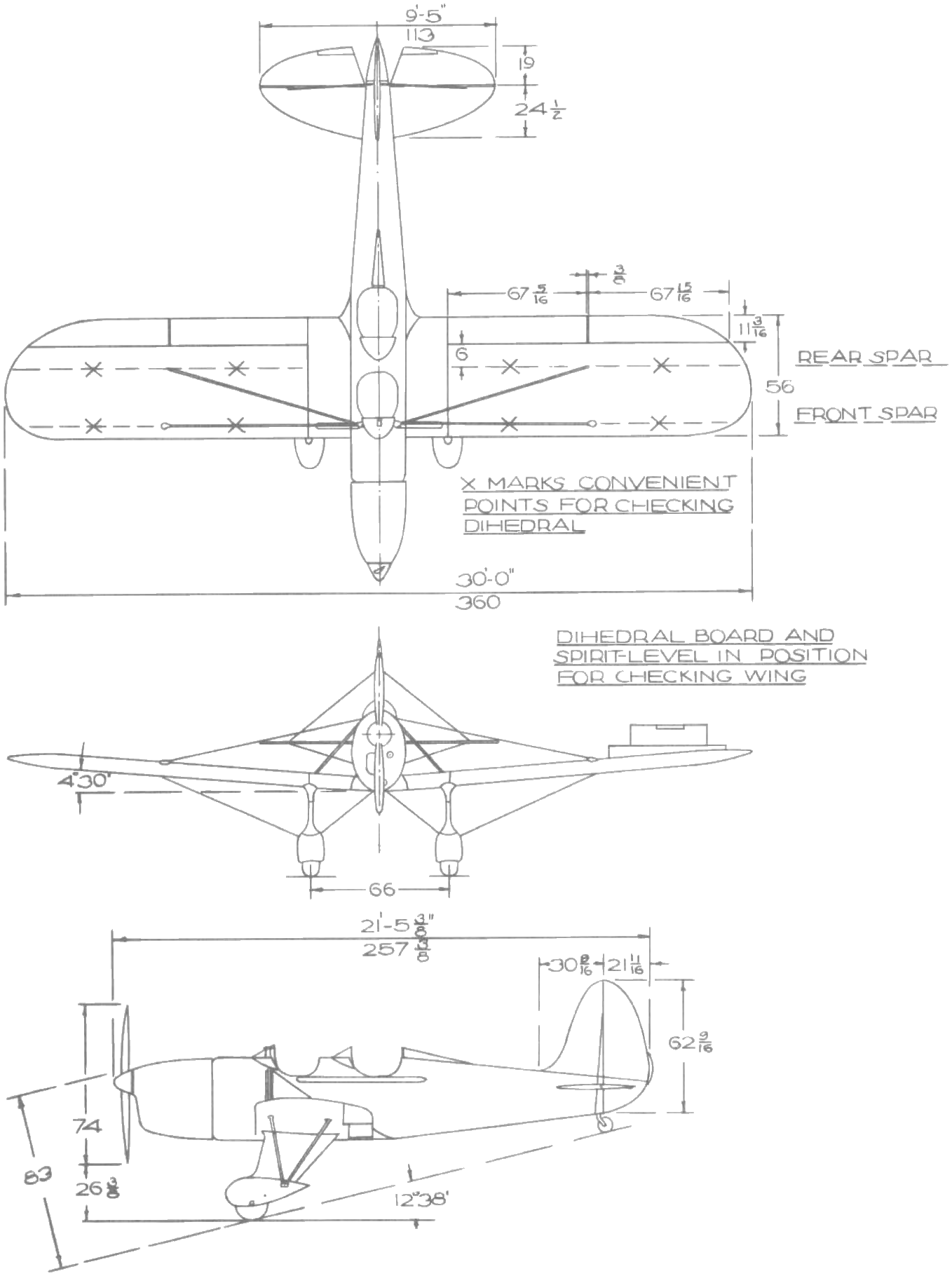
3-view line drawing of the Ryan ST-A

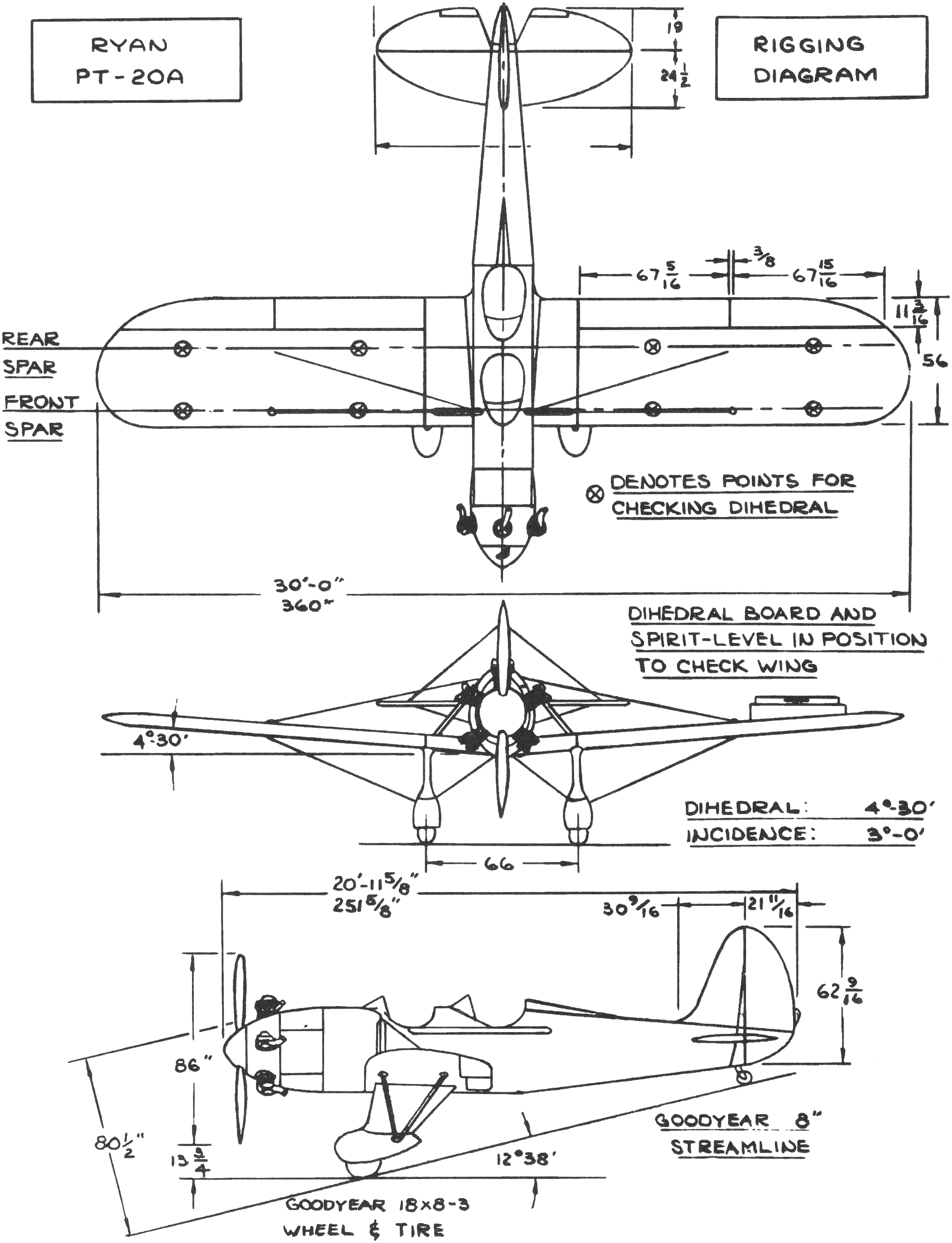
3-view line drawing of the Ryan PT-20A

Data from Profile Number 158: The Ryan PT/ST Series

General characteristics

- Crew: one
- Capacity: one passenger
- Length: 21 ft 5 in (6.53 m)
- Wingspan: 29 ft 11 in (9.12 m)
- Height: 6 ft 11 in (2.11 m)
- Wing area: 124 sq ft (11.5 m^{2})
- Empty weight: 1,023 lb (464 kg)
- Gross weight: 1,575 lb (714 kg)
- Fuel capacity: 24 US gal (20 imp gal; 91 L)
- Powerplant: 1 × Menasco C4 inverted four-cylinder air-cooled inline-engine, 125 hp (93 kW)

Performance

- Maximum speed: 150 mph (240 km/h, 130 kn)
- Cruise speed: 127 mph (204 km/h, 110 kn)
- Stall speed: 42 mph (68 km/h, 36 kn) (with flaps)
- Range: 350 mi (560 km, 300 nmi)
- Service ceiling: 17,500 ft (5,300 m)
- Rate of climb: 1,200 ft/min (6.1 m/s)

== See also ==
- Historical Ryan STA, homebuilt replica of the Ryan design

Aircraft of comparable role, configuration, and era

- de Havilland Moth Minor
- Fairchild PT-19
- Miles Magister
- Yakovlev UT-2
