= List of military aircraft of Nazi Germany =

For unbuilt projects, see List of German aircraft projects, 1939–45. For missiles, see List of German guided weapons of World War II.

== Aero ==
- Aero Ab-101 captured from Czechoslovakia and used as trainer
- Aero A.304 captured from Czechoslovakia and used as trainer

== Albatros ==
- Albatros Al 101 'L 101', two-seat sportsplane, 1930
- Albatros Al 102 'L 102', two-seat sportsplane, 1931
- Albatros Al 103 'L 103', two-seat sportsplane, 1932

== Arado ==
- Arado Ar 64 fighter
- Arado Ar 65 fighter/trainer
- Arado Ar 66 trainer/night fighter
- Arado Ar 67 fighter (prototype)
- Arado Ar 68 fighter
- Arado Ar 69 trainer (prototypes), 1933
- Arado Ar 76 fighter/trainer
- Arado Ar 80 fighter (prototype)
- Arado Ar 81 dive bomber (prototype), 1936
- Arado Ar 95 patrol/reconnaissance floatplane, 1936
- Arado Ar 96 trainer
- Arado Ar 196 ship-borne reconnaissance/patrol floatplane
- Arado Ar 197 naval fighter (prototype)
- Arado Ar 198 reconnaissance (prototype)
- Arado Ar 199 seaplane trainer (prototypes)
- Arado Ar 231 folding U-boat reconnaissance aircraft (prototype)
- Arado Ar 232 transport
- Arado Ar 234 Blitz ('Lightning'), jet bomber
- Arado Ar 240 heavy fighter
- Arado Ar 396 trainer
- Arado Ar 440 heavy fighter (prototypes)

== Avia ==
- Avia B.71 captured from Czechoslovakia and used as trainer
- Avia B.534 captured from Czechoslovakia and used as trainer and night fighter

== Bachem ==
- Bachem Ba 349 Natter ('Snake'), rocket interceptor

== Bloch ==
- Bloch MB.155 captured from France and used as trainer
- Bloch MB.175 captured from France and used as trainer
- Bloch MB.200 captured from France and used as trainer

== Blohm & Voss ==
- Blohm & Voss BV 40 glider interceptor (prototype)
- Blohm & Voss BV 138 flying-boat (formerly Ha 138)
- Blohm & Voss Ha 139 long range cargo/mailplane floatplane
- Blohm & Voss Ha 140 torpedo bomber seaplane (prototype)
- Blohm & Voss BV 141 asymmetric reconnaissance (prototype)
- Blohm & Voss BV 142 transport/maritime patrol
- Blohm & Voss Bv 144 transport
- Blohm & Voss BV 155 high-altitude interceptor (formerly Me 155)
- Blohm & Voss BV 222 Wiking ('Viking'), transport flying-boat
- Blohm & Voss BV 238 flying-boat (prototype)

== Breguet ==
- Breguet 521 Bizerte captured/bought from France and used for air-sea rescue

== Bücker ==
- Bücker Bü 131 Jungmann ('Young Man'), biplane trainer
- Bücker Bü 133 Jungmeister ('Young Champion'), aerobatic biplane trainer
- Bücker Bü 180 Student ('Student'), trainer
- Bücker Bü 181 Bestmann ('Bestman'), trainer/utility transport
- Bücker Bü 182 Kornett ('Ensign'), trainer (prototypes)

== Cantieri Aeronautici e Navali Triestini (CANT) ==
- CANT Z.1007 captured from Italy after armistice and used as a bomber

== Caudron ==
- Caudron C.440 Goéland captured from France and used as transport
- Caudron C.630 Simoun captured from France and used as transport

== Deutsche Forschungsanstalt für Segelflug (DFS) ==
- DFS SG 38 Schulgleiter training glider
- DFS 6 may be 'Model 6' or 'DFS B6'
- DFS 39 Lippisch tailless research aircraft
- DFS 40 Lippisch tailless research aircraft
- DFS 194 rocket-powered research aircraft, forerunner of Me 163
- DFS 228 rocket-powered reconnaissance aircraft (prototype)
- DFS 230 transport glider
- DFS 331 transport glider (prototype)
- DFS 332 wing profile research aircraft
- DFS 346 supersonic research aircraft (incomplete prototype only)

== Dewoitine ==
- Dewoitine D.520 captured from France and used as fighter trainer

== Dornier ==
- Dornier Do 10 (Do C1) fighter (prototype), 1931
- Dornier Do 11 (Do F) medium bomber, 1931
- Dornier Do 12 seaplane, 1932
- Dornier Do 13 medium bomber (Development of Do 11), 1933
- Dornier Do 14 seaplane (prototype)
- Dornier Do 15 Wal ('Whale') reconnaissance flying-boat
- Dornier Do 17 mail-plane, bomber and night-fighter
- Dornier Do 18 reconnaissance bomber flying-boat, 1935
- Dornier Do 19 prototype four engine heavy bomber
- Dornier Do 22 torpedo bomber/reconnaissance flying-boat
- Dornier Do 23 medium bomber
- Dornier Do 24 flying boat
- Dornier Do 215 bomber and night-fighter
- Dornier Do 217 bomber and night-fighter
- Dornier Do 335 fighter-bomber (push-pull engine configuration)

== Douglas ==
- Douglas DC-2 captured from Netherlands, includes ex-KLM aircraft, used as transport

== Fieseler ==
- Fieseler Fi 2 (F-2 Tiger), acrobatic sportsplane, 1932
- Fieseler Fi 5 (F-5) acrobatic sportsplane/trainer, 1933
- Fieseler Fi 98 biplane fighter, 1936
- Fieseler Fi 103 (V-1), flying bomb
- Fieseler Fi 156 Storch ('Stork'), STOL reconnaissance aircraft
- Fieseler Fi 167 ship-borne biplane reconnaissance/torpedo bomber
- Fieseler Fi 103R "Reichenberg", manned suicide V-1

== Flettner ==
- Flettner Fl 184 reconnaissance helicopter, prototype
- Flettner Fl 185 reconnaissance helicopter, prototype
- Flettner Fl 265 reconnaissance helicopter, prototype
- Flettner Fl 282 Kolibri ('Hummingbird'), reconnaissance helicopter

== Fiat ==
- Fiat CR.42 Falco ('Hawk'), ground attack/night fighter 1943-1945

== Focke Achgelis ==
- Focke Achgelis Fa 223 Drache ('Kite'), transport helicopter (prototype
- Focke Achgelis Fa 266 Hornisse ('Hornet'), helicopter (prototype)
- Focke Achgelis Fa 330 helicopter (prototype)
- Focke Achgelis Fa 336 scout helicopter (prototype), 1944

== Focke-Wulf ==
- Focke-Wulf Fw 44 Stieglitz ('Goldfinch'), trainer (biplane)
- Focke-Wulf Fw 56 Stösser ('Falcon Hawk'), trainer (parasol monoplane)
- Focke-Wulf Fw 57 heavy fighter + bomber (prototype)
- Focke-Wulf Fw 58 Weihe ('Kite'), trainer/transport
- Focke-Wulf Fw 61 helicopter (prototype)
- Focke-Wulf Fw 62 ship-borne reconnaissance (biplane seaplane)
- Focke-Wulf Ta 152 fighter
- Focke-Wulf Ta 153 Ta 152 with high aspect wings
- Focke-Wulf Ta 154 Moskito ('Mosquito'), night-fighter
- Focke-Wulf Fw 159 fighter (prototype only)
- Focke-Wulf Fw 186 reconnaissance autogyro (prototype)
- Focke-Wulf Fw 187 Falke ('Falcon'), heavy fighter
- Focke-Wulf Fw 189 Uhu ('Owl'), ground-attack
- Focke-Wulf Fw 190 Wurger ('Shrike'), fighter
- Focke-Wulf Fw 191 twin-engined medium bomber
- Focke-Wulf Fw 200 Condor ('Condor'), transport/maritime patrol

== Fokker ==
- Fokker C.VE captured from various countries and used as a night ground attack aircraft
- Fokker F.IX captured from Czechoslovakia

== Göppingen ==
- Göppingen Gö 1 Wolf I sailplane, 1935
- Göppingen Gö 3 Minimoa sailplane, 1936
- Göppingen Gö 4 sailplane
- Göppingen Gö 5 sailplane, 1937
- Göppingen Gö 8 1:5 scale development aircraft for Dornier Do 214 project
- Göppingen Gö 9 development aircraft for Do 335 Pfiel pusher engine

== Gotha ==
- Gotha Go 145 trainer
- Gotha Go 146 transport, 1935
- Gotha Go 147 STOL reconnaissance (prototype)
- Gotha Go 229 flying-wing jet fighter-bomber
- Gotha Go 242 transport glider
- Gotha Go 244 transport
- Gotha Go 345 assault glider
- Gotha Ka 430 transport glider (prototypes)

== Heinkel ==
- Heinkel He 37 fighter
- Heinkel He 38 fighter
- Heinkel He 43 fighter
- Heinkel He 45 bomber/trainer
- Heinkel He 46 reconnaissance
- Heinkel He 49 fighter
- Heinkel He 50 reconnaissance/dive bomber
- Heinkel He 51 fighter/close-support
- Heinkel He 59 reconnaissance/air-sea rescue floatplane
- Heinkel He 60 ship-borne reconnaissance floatplane
- Heinkel He 70 Blitz ('Lightning'), transport/bomber, 1932
- Heinkel He 72 Kadett ('Cadet'), trainer
- Heinkel He 74 fighter/advanced trainer (prototype)
- Heinkel He 100 fighter
- Heinkel He 111 bomber
- Heinkel He 112 fighter
- Heinkel He 113 (propaganda designation for He 100)
- Heinkel He 114 reconnaissance seaplane
- Heinkel He 115 general-purpose seaplane
- Heinkel He 116 transport + reconnaissance
- Heinkel He 118 dive bomber
- Heinkel He 119 high-speed reconnaissance/bomber (prototypes), 1937
- Heinkel He 162 Volksjäger ('People's Fighter'), jet fighter
- Heinkel He 172 trainer (prototype)
- Heinkel He 176 experimental rocket aircraft
- Heinkel He 177 Greif ('Griffon'), heavy bomber
- Heinkel He 178 experimental jet aircraft
- Heinkel He 219 Uhu ('Owl'), night fighter
- Heinkel He 274 high-altitude bomber
- Heinkel He 277 four-engine He 177
- Heinkel He 280 jet fighter

== Henschel ==
- Henschel Hs 121 fighter/trainer (prototype)
- Henschel Hs 123 ground-attack (biplane)
- Henschel Hs 124 heavy fighter/bomber (prototype)
- Henschel Hs 125 fighter/trainer (prototype)
- Henschel Hs 126 reconnaissance
- Henschel Hs 127 jet bomber (prototype)
- Henschel Hs 129 ground-attack
- Henschel Hs 130 high altitude reconnaissance/bomber (prototype)
- Henschel Hs 132 jet dive bomber (prototype)

== Junkers ==
- Junkers W 33 utility transport, 1926
- Junkers W 34 utility transport/trainer, 1933
- Junkers Ju 52 Tante Ju ('Auntie Ju'), transport/bomber
- Junkers Ju 86 bomber/reconnaissance/transport
- Junkers Ju 87 Stuka, dive-bomber
- Junkers Ju 88 reconnaissance/bomber/night-fighter
- Junkers Ju 89 heavy bomber (prototype)
- Junkers Ju 90 bomber (prototype)
- Junkers Ju 188 Rächer ('Avenger'), bomber
- Junkers Ju 248 Junkers version of Me 263
- Junkers Ju 252 transport
- Junkers Ju 287 heavy jet bomber (prototype)
- Junkers Ju 288 bomber (prototype)
- Junkers Ju 290 long-range bomber (prototype)
- Junkers Ju 322 Mammut (Mammoth), transport glider (prototype), 1941)
- Junkers Ju 352 Herkules ('Hercules'), transport
- Junkers Ju 388 Störtebeker, reconnaissance/night-fighter
- Junkers Ju 390 long-range bomber
- Junkers Ju 488 heavy bomber
- Junkers EF 61 high-altitude bomber (prototype)
- Junkers EF 131 jet bomber (prototype)
- Junkers EF 132 heavy bomber (prototype)

== Klemm ==
- Klemm Kl 31 single-engine transport, 1931
- Klemm Kl 32 single-engine transport, 1931
- Klemm Kl 33 (Klemm L33), single-seat ultra-light sportplane (prototype), 1933
- Klemm Kl 35 sportplane/trainer, 1935
- Klemm Kl 36 single-engine transport, 1934

== Latécoère ==
- Latécoère 298 captured from France

== Lioré et Olivier (LeO) ==
- Lioré et Olivier LeO H-246 captured from France and used as transports

== Macchi ==
- Macchi C.202 captured from Italy after armistice and used as trainers
- Macchi C.205 captured from Italy after armistice and used as fighters

== Marinens Flyvebaatfabrikk ==
- Høver/Marinens Flyvebaatfabrikk M.F.11 captured from Finland and used as transport

== Messerschmitt ==
- Messerschmitt Bf 108 Taifun ('Typhoon'), utility transport/trainer
- Messerschmitt Bf 109 fighter
- Messerschmitt Bf 110 heavy fighter/night-fighter
- Messerschmitt Bf 162 bomber (prototype)
- Messerschmitt Bf 163 STOL reconnaissance aircraft (prototypes only)
- Messerschmitt Me 163 Komet ('Comet'), rocket interceptor
- Messerschmitt Me 209 speed-record aircraft (prototype)
- Messerschmitt Me 209-II fighter (prototype – unrelated to Me 209)
- Messerschmitt Me 210 heavy fighter/reconnaissance
- Messerschmitt Me 261 long-range reconnaissance
- Messerschmitt Me 262 Schwalbe ('Swallow'), jet fighter-bomber
- Messerschmitt Me 263 rocket interceptor
- Messerschmitt Me 264 Amerika Bomber long-range bomber (prototype)
- Messerschmitt Me 309 fighter (prototype)
- Messerschmitt Me 321 Gigant ('Giant'), transport glider
- Messerschmitt Me 323 Gigant ('Giant'), transport aircraft
- Messerschmitt Me 328 parasite fighter
- Messerschmitt Me 410 Hornisse ('Hornet'), heavy fighter + reconnaissance
- Messerschmitt P.1101 jet fighter (prototype)

== Morane-Saulnier ==
- Morane-Saulnier M.S.230 captured from France and used as trainer
- Morane-Saulnier M.S.406 captured from France and used as fighter trainer

== North American Aviation ==
- North American NA-57 captured from France and used as trainer
- North American NA-64 captured from France and used as trainer
- North American P-51 captured

== Podlaska Wytwórnia Samolotów (PWS) ==
- PWS-26 captured from Czechoslovakia and use as trainer

== Savoia-Marchetti ==
- Savoia-Marchetti SM.79 captured from Italy after armistice
- Savoia-Marchetti SM.82 captured from Italy after armistice and used as transports

== Siebel ==
- Siebel Fh 104 Hallore, medium transport
- Siebel Si 201 STOL reconnaissance aircraft (prototype)
- Siebel Si 202 Hummel ('bumblebee') sportplane/trainer, 1938
- Siebel Si 204 transport/crew trainer

== Zlín ==
- Zlín Z-XII captured from Czechoslovakia and used as a trainer
- Zlín Z-212 captured from Czechoslovakia and used as a trainer

== See also ==
- List of aircraft engines of Germany during World War II
- List of aircraft of the French Air Force during World War II
- List of common World War II infantry weapons
- List of gliders
- List of RLM aircraft designations (for a full listing by type designations)
- List of weapons of military aircraft of Germany during World War II
- List of World War II military aircraft of Germany
