= Arado Ar 76 =

1934 fighter aircraft series by Arado

Ar 76
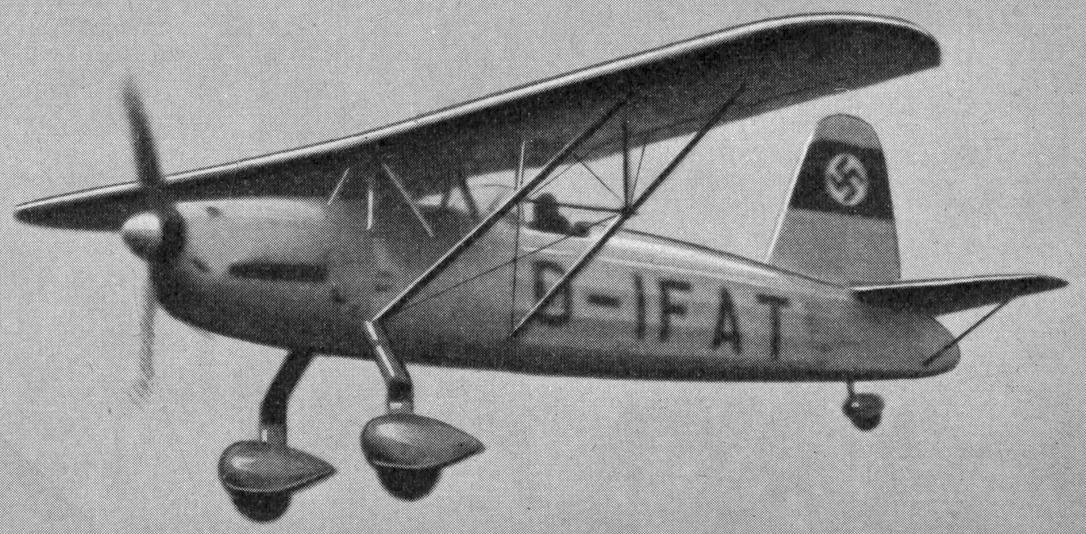
- Arado Ar 76 V3 photo from Le Pontentiel Aérien Mondial 1936

General information
- Type: Fighter
- Manufacturer: Arado
- Designer: Walter Blume
- Primary user: Luftwaffe
- Number built: 189

History
- Introduction date: 1936
- First flight: April 1934

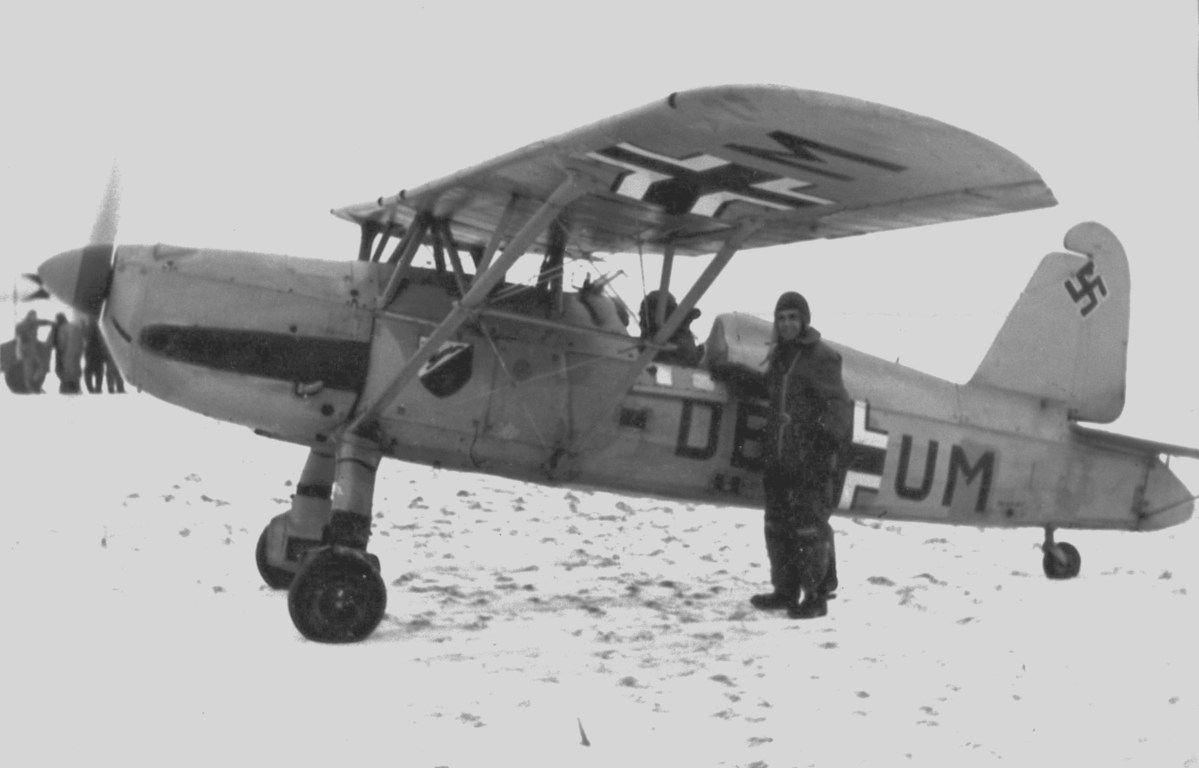
Arado Ar 76

The Arado Ar 76 was a German aircraft of the 1930s, designed as a light fighter with a secondary role as an advanced trainer in mind.

== Development ==
Arado's response to a requirement by the Reichsluftfahrtministerium (RLM) for a light / emergency fighter aircraft, was the Ar 76 which was evaluated against the Heinkel He 74, Focke-Wulf Fw 56, the Henschel Hs 121 and Hs 125 in 1935. Although the Fw 56 was selected for the main production contract, the RLM was sufficiently impressed by the Ar 76 to order a small number of production aircraft as well.

== Design ==
The Ar 76 was a parasol-wing monoplane with fixed, tailwheel undercarriage. The wings were constructed of fabric-covered wood, and the fuselage was fabric-covered steel tube.

It was powered by an Argus As 10C inverted V8 which produced 240 horsepower (180 kW) and was capable of propelling the Ar 76 up to a maximum speed of 267 km/h (166 mph) and to a maximum altitude of 6,400 m (21,000 ft).

When used as a fighter the Ar 76 was armed with twin 7.92mm MG 17 machine guns which were mounted above the engine and each had access to 250 rounds. However, when used as an advanced trainer, it only carried a single MG 17. Alongside this it could also carry two 10 kg (22 lb) SC 10 bombs, one under each wing.

== Operational history ==
Production Ar 76A aircraft were used by Jagdfliegerschulen (fighter pilot schools) from 1936.

== Variants ==
Data from:

Ar 76a
First prototype, (regn. D-ISEN).
Ar 76 V2
Second prototype, (regn. D-IRAS).
Ar 76 V3
Third prototype.
Ar 76A
Single-seat advanced trainer, lightweight fighter aircraft. Built in small numbers.

== Operators ==
Germany

- Luftwaffe

== Specifications (Ar 76A-0) ==
Data from Aircraft of the Third Reich, Flugzeug Typenbuch 1936Luftwaffe Warbird Resource Group

General characteristics

- Crew: one
- Length: 7.2 m (23 ft 7 in)
- Wingspan: 9.50 m (31 ft 2 in)
- Height: 2.55 m (8 ft 4 in)
- Wing area: 13.34 m^{2} (143.6 sq ft)
- Aspect ratio: 6.5
- Empty weight: 751 kg (1,656 lb)
- Gross weight: 1,072 kg (2,363 lb)
- Fuel capacity: main tank:105 L (28 US gal; 23 imp gal); oil tank:12 L (3.2 US gal; 2.6 imp gal)
- Powerplant: 1 × Argus As 10C inverted V-8 air-cooled piston engine, 179 kW (240 hp)
- Propellers: 2-bladed wooden fixed pitch propeller

Performance

- Maximum speed: 267 km/h (166 mph, 144 kn)
- Cruise speed: 221 km/h (137 mph, 119 kn)
- Landing Speed: 100 km/h (62 mph; 54 kn)
- Range: 470 km (290 mi, 250 nmi)
- Endurance: 2 hr 24 minutes
- Service ceiling: 6,400 m (21,000 ft)
- Rate of climb: 7.2 m/s (1,420 ft/min)
- Time to altitude: 1,000 m (3,300 ft) in 2.5 minutes
- Fuel consumption: 21 L (5.5 US gal; 4.6 imp gal) / 100 km (54 nmi; 62 mi)
- Oil consumption: 0.8 L (0.21 US gal; 0.18 imp gal) / 100 km (54 nmi; 62 mi)

Armament

- Guns:
  - Fighter: 2 × 7.92 mm (0.312 in) MG 17 machine guns, 250 rounds per gun
  - Trainer: 1 × 7.92 mm (0.312 in) MG 17 machine guns, 250 rounds per gun
- Bombs: 2 × 10 kg (22 lb) SC 10 fragmentation bombs

== See also ==
Related lists

- List of Interwar military aircraft
- List of military aircraft of Germany
