= Arado Ar 197 =

German world war-ll era biplane

Ar 197
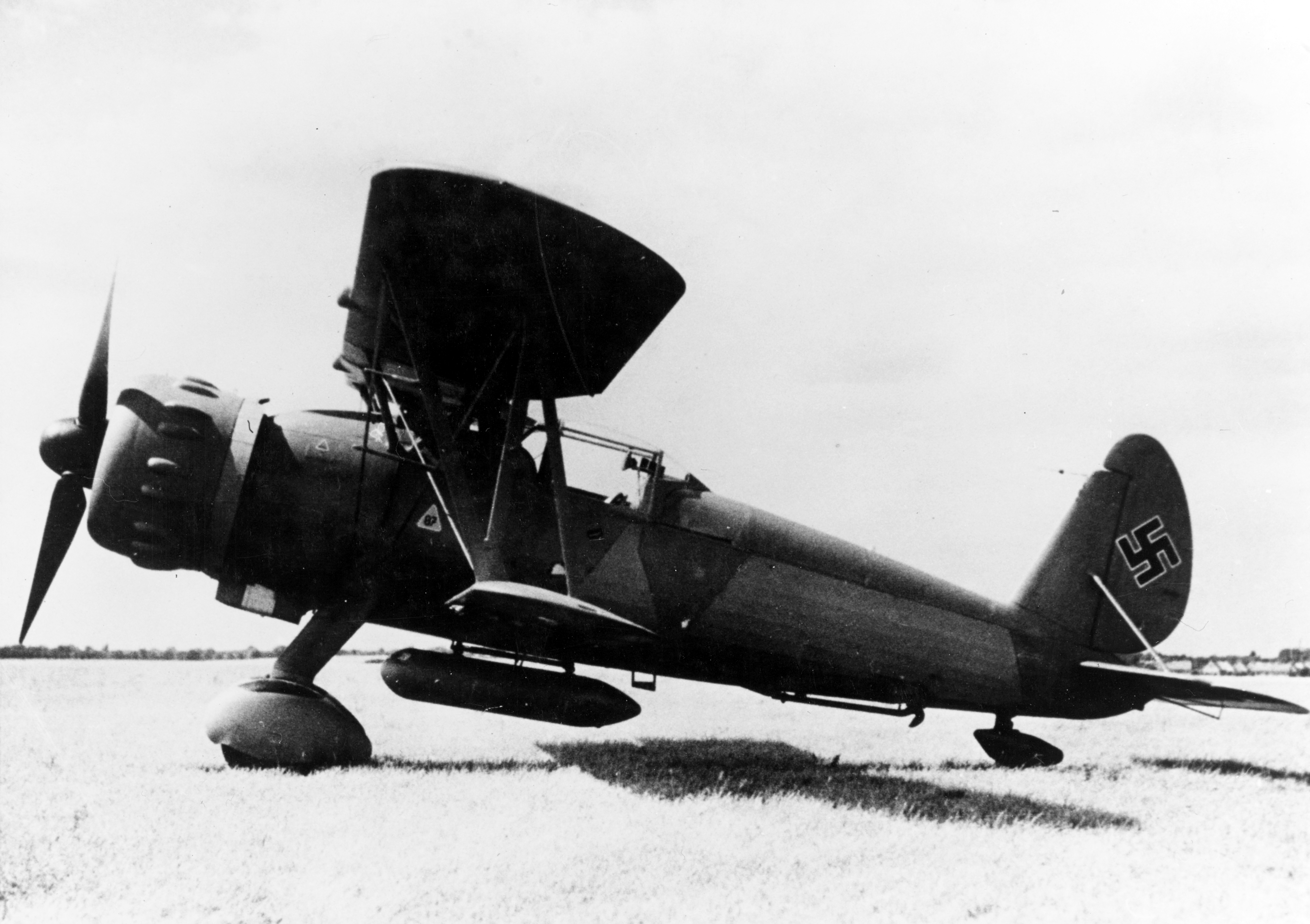

General information
- Type: Naval fighter
- Manufacturer: Arado Flugzeugwerke
- Designer: Walter Blume
- Status: Prototype
- Primary user: Luftwaffe
- Number built: 3

History
- First flight: Spring 1937
- Developed from: Arado Ar 68H

The Arado Ar 197 was a German World War II-era biplane, designed for naval operations for the never-completed German aircraft carrier Graf Zeppelin. Only a few prototypes were built; the project was abandoned in favour of the Messerschmitt Bf 109T and Me 155.

== Design and development ==
The Ar 197 had its origin in the requirement for a fighter capable of operating from the planned (but never completed) German aircraft carriers Graf Zeppelin and Peter Strasser. The Ar 68H had been the first Arado aircraft to have a fully enclosed cockpit, and was selected as a base design for the Arado Ar 197.

The first prototype of the Ar 197, the V1, was based on the Ar 68H and featured a fully enclosed cockpit, Daimler-Benz DB 600A inline engine, and three-blade propeller, but was not fitted for naval operations. The second prototype, the Ar 197 V2, was similar to the V1, but was powered by a BMW 132Dc radial engine, and was fitted with naval equipment, including an arrester hook and catapult spools. Both the Ar 197 V1 and V2 flew in the spring of 1937. In the summer of 1937 a third prototype, the V3, was built. It was powered by a more powerful BMW radial engine and was the first prototype fitted with weapons, being armed with two 7.92 mm (.312 in) machine guns and one 20 mm cannon. The V3 was also fitted with racks under the fuselage which could carry four 50 kg (110 lb) bombs, an auxiliary fuel tank, or a smoke-laying canister.

== Operational history ==
The Ar 197 V3 was selected to participate in evaluation, but was not chosen for production. By the time the Graf Zeppelin was to have been completed, biplanes such as the Ar 197 would have been hopelessly outclassed as fighters. In 1939, the Bf 109T, the naval version of the Messerschmitt Bf 109 fighter plane, was selected as the successor to the Arado Ar 197, and in 1941, the Me 155 was selected as the successor to the Bf 109T.

== Operators ==
Germany

- Luftwaffe

== Specifications (Arado Ar 197 V3) ==
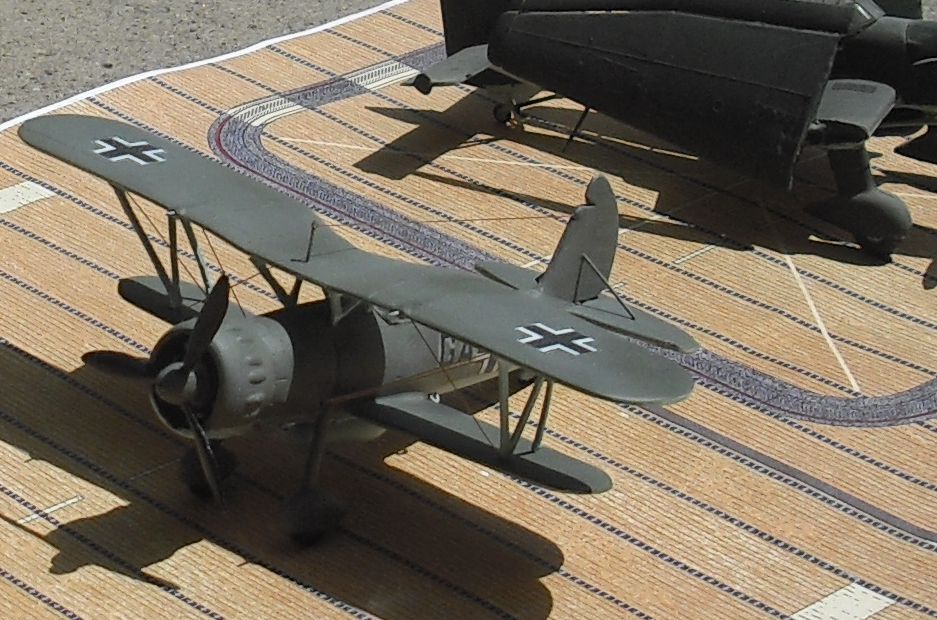
Model of an Ar 197 aboard the carrier Graf Zeppelin.

Data from Aircraft of the Third Reich Vol.1

General characteristics

- Crew: one
- Length: 9.2 m (30 ft 2 in)
- Wingspan: 11 m (36 ft 1 in)
- Height: 3.6 m (11 ft 10 in)
- Wing area: 21.3 m^{2} (229 sq ft)
- Empty weight: 1,840 kg (4,057 lb)
- Gross weight: 2,475 kg (5,456 lb)
- Max takeoff weight: 2,674 kg (5,895 lb)
- Powerplant: 1 × BMW 132Dc 9-cyl. air-cooled radial piston engine, 656 kW (880 hp) for take-off
- Propellers: 3-bladed fixed pitch metal propeller

Performance

- Maximum speed: 400 km/h (250 mph, 220 kn) at 2,500 m (8,200 ft)
- Cruise speed: 354 km/h (220 mph, 191 kn) at 1,500 m (4,900 ft)
- Range: 695 km (432 mi, 375 nmi)
- Ferry range: 1,638 km (1,018 mi, 884 nmi) with auxiliary fuel tank
- Service ceiling: 8,600 m (28,200 ft)
- Time to altitude: 4,000 m (13,000 ft) in 5.3 minutes

Armament

- 2 x 7.92 mm (0.312 in) MG 17 machine guns with 500 rpg and 2 x 20 mm MG FF cannon with 60 rpg.
- Up to 4 50 kg (110 lb) SC50 bombs.

== See also ==
Related development

- Arado Ar 68

Aircraft of comparable role, configuration, and era

- Gloster Sea Gladiator
- Grumman F2F
- Mitsubishi A5M

Related lists

- List of military aircraft of Germany
- List of military aircraft of Nazi Germany
