= HS-121 =

HS-121 or Hs-121 can refer to:

- Hawker Siddeley HS-121 Trident, a British airliner
- Henschel Hs 121, a German trainer aircraft
