= Heinkel He 74 =

German light fighter aircraft

He 74
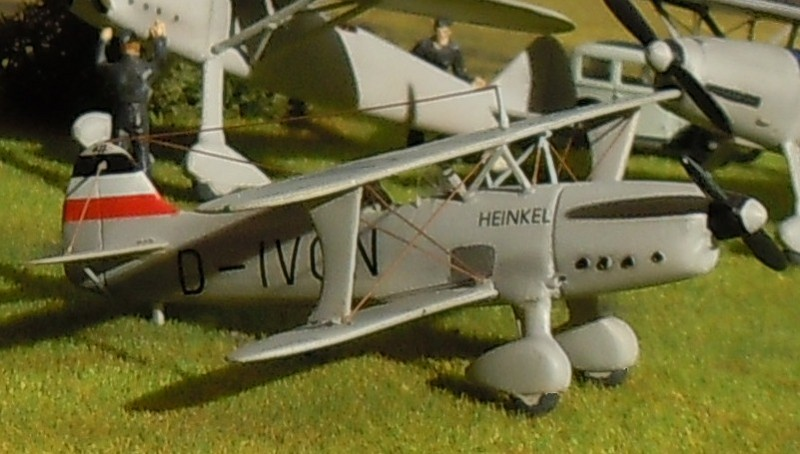

General information
- Type: Light fighter and advanced trainer
- Manufacturer: Heinkel
- Designer: Günter brothers
- Number built: 3

History
- First flight: 1933

The Heinkel He 74 was a light fighter aircraft developed in Germany in the early 1930s. It was a conventional, single-bay biplane with staggered, unequal-span wings braced with an I-type interplane strut. The pilot sat in an open cockpit, and the undercarriage was of the fixed, tailskid type.

It was designed in response to a RLM requirement for a Heimatschutzjäger - a light fighter aircraft suitable for purely defensive duties and which would have a secondary role as an advanced trainer for fighter pilots. Although it was not strictly a requirement of the specification, firms submitting designs were urged to use a monoplane layout.

During trials in 1934, the He 74 outperformed its competitors, but in the end, the RLM awarded it third place, behind the Focke-Wulf Fw 56 and Arado Ar 76, believing that since the fighters then being developed were all monoplanes, this configuration was essential for an advanced trainer as well.

== Specifications ==
Data from Warplanes of the Third Reich

General characteristics

- Crew: One pilot
- Length: 6.45 m (21 ft 2 in)
- Wingspan: 8.15 m (26 ft 8.75 in)
- Height: 2.20 m (7 ft 2.5 in)
- Wing area: 14.9 m^{2} (160.6 sq ft)
- Empty weight: 771 kg (1,697 lb)
- Gross weight: 1,019 kg (2,242 lb)
- Powerplant: 1 × Argus As 10C , 180 kW (240 hp)

Performance

- Maximum speed: 280 km/h (174 mph, 151 kn)
- Cruise speed: 235 km/h (146 mph, 127 kn)
- Range: 370 km (230 mi, 200 nmi)
- Service ceiling: 4,800 m (15,750 ft)
- Rate of climb: 6.4 m/s (1,262 ft/min)

Armament

- 1 × fixed, forward-firing 7.92 mm (.312 in) MG 17 machine gun
