= Heinkel He 112 =

Fighter aircraft family

He 112
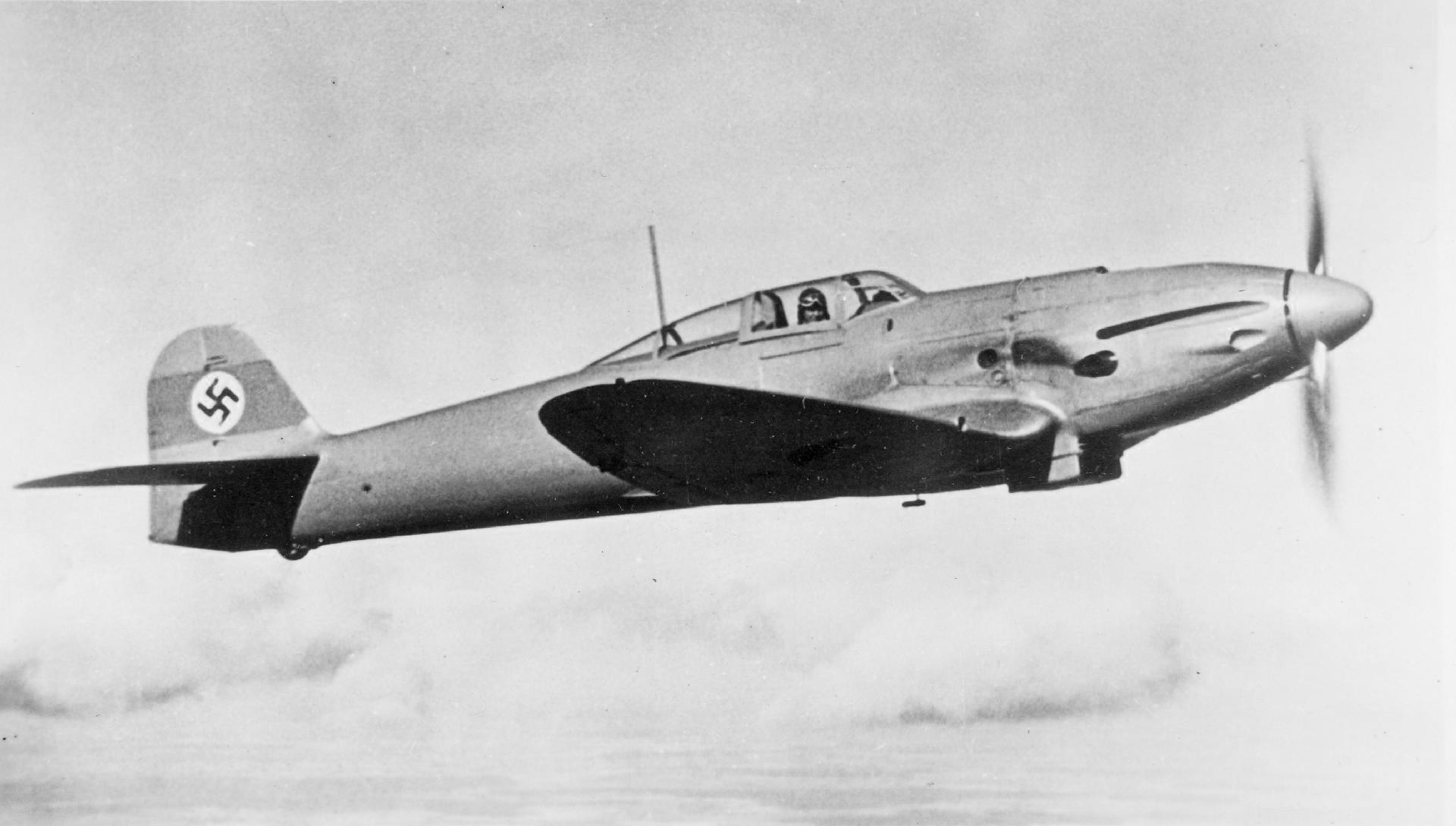

General information
- Type: Fighter
- Manufacturer: Heinkel
- Designer: Günter brothers
- Status: Retired
- Primary users: Luftwaffe: Spanish Air Force; Royal Hungarian Air Force; Royal Romanian Air Force
- Number built: 103

History
- First flight: September 1935

The Heinkel He 112 is a German fighter aircraft designed by Siegfried and Walter Günter. It was one of four aircraft designed to compete for the 1933 fighter contract of the Luftwaffe, in which it came second behind the Messerschmitt Bf 109. Small numbers were used for a short time by the Luftwaffe and some were built for other countries, with around 100 being completed.

== Design and development ==
In the early 1930s, the German authorities started placing orders for new aircraft, initially training and utility aircraft. Heinkel, as one of the most experienced firms in the country, received contracts for a number of two-seat aircraft, including the He 45, He 46, and He 50. The company also worked on single-seat fighter designs, which culminated in the He 49 and later with the improved He 51. When the He 51 was tested in combat in the Spanish Civil War, it was shown that speed was far more important than maneuverability. The Luftwaffe took this lesson to heart and started replacing its He 51s in the fighter role with the Bf 109.

In October 1933, Hermann Göring sent out a letter requesting aircraft companies consider the design of a "high-speed courier aircraft" – a thinly veiled request for a new fighter. Each company was asked to build three prototypes for run-off testing. By spring 1935, the Arado and Focke-Wulf aircraft were ready, the BFW arriving in March, and the He 112 in April.

In early May 1934, despite Germany being under a prohibition from the development of new military aircraft, the Reichsluftfahrtministerium (RLM/German Air Ministry) issued a request for a new single-seat monoplane fighter under the guise that the proposal was for creating a new 'sports plane'. The Technisches Amt outlined specifications, for the supply of a new fighter aircraft, those submissions for the competition had to meet certain characteristics, including; a) having an all-metal construction, b) having a monoplane configuration, c) having retractable landing gear, d) be capable of achieving a top speed of at least 400 km/h (250 mph) at an altitude of 6,000 m (20,000 ft), e) endure ninety minutes at full throttle at 6,000 m (20,000 ft) f) reach an altitude of 6,000 m (20,000 ft) in seven minutes and have a service ceiling of 10,000 m (33,000 ft) g) be able to be fitted with a Junkers Jumo 210 engine h) be armed with either two 7.92mm fixed machine guns or one 20 mm cannon and i) have a wing loading of less than 100 kg/m^{2}.

In February 1934 three companies, Arado, Bayerische Flugzeugwerke (BFW), and Heinkel were awarded contracts to develop prototypes for the competition, with a fourth company, Focke-Wulf, being awarded the contract more than six months later in September 1934. The prototypes that were eventually submitted for the competition were the Arado Ar 80, Focke-Wulf Fw 159, Heinkel He 112, and Messerschmitt Bf 109. Heinkel had begun development of its submission in late 1933 in anticipation of the announcement. At the helm of its design project were the Günter brothers, Siegfried and Walter, designers of the He 111, who were then working on the design for the He 112. The first prototype had its first flight in September 1935.

=== Heinkel's design ===
Heinkel's design was created primarily by twin brothers Walter and Siegfried Günter, whose designs would dominate most of Heinkel's work. They started work on Projekt 1015 in late 1933 under the guise of the original courier aircraft, based around the BMW XV inline engine. Work was already underway when the official request went out on 2 May, and on 5 May the design was renamed the He 112.

The primary source of inspiration for the He 112 was their earlier He 70 Blitz ("Lightning") design. The Blitz was a single-engine, four-passenger aircraft originally designed for use by Lufthansa, and it, in turn, was inspired by the famous Lockheed Model 9 Orion mail plane. Like many civilian designs of the time, the aircraft was pressed into military service and was used as a two-seat bomber (although mostly for reconnaissance) and served in this role in Spain. The Blitz introduced a number of new construction techniques to the Heinkel company; it was its first low-wing monoplane, its first with retractable landing gear, its first all-metal monocoque design and its elliptical, reverse-gull wing would be seen on a number of later projects. The Blitz could almost meet the new fighter requirements itself, so it is not surprising that the Günters would choose to work with the existing design as much as possible.

Ernst Heinkel's He 112 submission was a scaled-down version of the He 70, a fast mail plane, sharing numerous features with it including an all-metal construction – including its oval cross-section fuselage and two spar monoplane wings which were covered with flush-head rivets and stressed metal skin-, similar inverted semi-elliptical gull wings and retractable landing gear. The wide track of the undercarriage, a result of having outward retraction from the low point of the wing's gull-bend, gave the aircraft excellent ground handling for take-off and landing. The open cockpit and fuselage spine behind the headrest mounted into the deep-section fuselage offered the pilot a good view when taxiing and were included to provide excellent vision and make biplane-trained pilots feel more comfortable.

=== Prototypes ===
The first prototype, V1, was completed on 1 September 1935. Specifications of the Technisches Amt required that the competing aircraft be fitted with the Junkers Jumo 210, however, as the engine was unavailable, a 518 kW (695 hp) Rolls-Royce Kestrel V was fitted instead. The V1 prototype of the Heinkel had comparatively large wings and was heavier than its contemporaries, however, due to the wing size, the mass was more evenly spread out resulting in lower wing loading. The upshot of this was that the aircraft had better turn performance; the down shot was that it generated more drag than expected and had a slowed roll rate.

The second prototype, V2, was completed in November. It was powered by a 480 kW (640 hp) Jumo 210C engine and fitted with a three-blade propeller but was otherwise identical to the V1. Meanwhile, the data from the V1 factory flights was studied to discover where the unexpected drag was coming from. The Günter brothers identified the large, thick wing as the main culprit, and designed an entirely new smaller, and thinner wing with an elliptical planform. As a stop-gap measure, the V2 had its wings clipped by 1.010 m (3 ft 3.8 in) to allow it to compete with the 109. This made the He 112 creep over the wing loading requirements in the specifications, but with the 109 way over the limit, this was not seen as a problem, and the V2 was sent off for testing. The V2, like its predecessor, had problems with spin stability and eventually crashed and was destroyed when test pilot Gerhard Nitschke bailed from the aircraft after losing control during a set of spin tests.

The V3 took to the air in January. Largely similar to the V2 and powered with the same engine, the V3 had minor changes including having a larger radiator, fuselage spine, and vertical stabilizer, having a single cover over the exhaust ports instead of the more common "stack", and also including modifications to allow armament to be installed in the cowling. The V3 was the first prototype fitted with armament in the form of two 7.92 mm (0.312 in) MG17 machine guns. It was later modified once more to include a sliding canopy and a new fully elliptical wing.

=== The contest ===
Trials of the competing aircraft for the RLM began at Reichlin in October 1935. The thick high-lift aerofoil and open cockpit of the He 112 generated more drag than the Bf 109, causing its performance to suffer despite being equipped with an identical engine. The Bf 109 prototype was able reach a top speed of 467 km/h (290 mph) but the He 112 slower at 440 km/h (270 mph)). The He 112 had better ground handling and wingloading. The other two competing aircraft, the Arado Ar 80 and the parasol wing Focke-Wulf Fw 159, had problems and performed badly compared to the Bf 109 and the He 112; they were eliminated from any serious consideration. At the end of the trials, the aircraft were judged similar enough that both Messerschmitt and Heinkel were awarded contracts to produce ten prototypes for further testing and competitive trials.

At this point, the He 112 was the favorite over the Bf 109, but opinions changed when the Bf 109 V2 arrived on 21 March. All the competitor aircraft had initially been equipped with the Rolls-Royce Kestrel engine due to the lack of the intended Jumo, but the Bf 109 V2 had the Jumo. From that point on, it started to outperform the He 112 in almost every way, including the Jumo-engined He 112 V2 from 15 April.

The He 112 had better turn performance due to its larger wing, but the Bf 109 was faster at all altitudes and had considerably better agility and aerobatic abilities. During spin tests on 2 March, the Bf 109 V2 showed no problems while the He 112 V2 crashed. Repairs were made to the aircraft and it was returned in April, but it crashed again and was written off. The V1 was then returned to Heinkel on 17 April and fitted with the V2's clipped wings.

Meanwhile, news came in that Supermarine had received a contract for full-scale production of the Spitfire. The Spitfire was far more advanced than any existing German aircraft and this caused a wave of concern in the high command of the Luftwaffe. Time now took on as much importance as any quality of the winning aircraft itself, and the RLM was ready to put any reasonable design into production. That design was the Bf 109, which in addition to demonstrating better performance, was considerably easier to build due to fewer compound curves and simpler construction throughout. On 12 March RLM produced a document called Bf 109 Priority Procurement which indicated which aircraft was now preferred. There were some within the RLM who still favored the Heinkel design, and as a result the RLM then sent out contracts for 10 "zero series" aircraft from both companies.

Testing continued until October, at which point some of the additional zero series aircraft had arrived. At the end of September, there were four He 112s being tested, yet none was a match for the Bf 109. From October on, the Bf 109 appears to have been selected as the winner of the contest. Although no clear date is given, in Stormy Life Ernst Udet himself delivered the news to Heinkel that the Bf 109 had entered series production in 1936. He is quoted as saying, "Pawn your crate off on the Turks or the Japanese or the Romanians. They'll lap it up." With a number of air forces looking to upgrade from biplanes and various designs from the early 1930s, the possibility for foreign sales was promising.

== He 112A ==
=== Prototypes ===
Heinkel had expected orders for additional aircraft beyond the initial three prototypes and was able to respond quickly to the new contract for the 10 zero series aircraft. The new aircraft would be given the series designation "He 112 A-0".

The first of these new versions, V4, was completed in June 1936. It featured a new elliptical wing, a more powerful 210D engine with a two-speed supercharger that brought the power to 510 kW (680 hp) for takeoff and a smaller tailplane. Like the V3, it also sported two fuselage-mounted 7.92 mm (0.312 in) MG 17 machine guns, unlike the V3, it featured two wing-mounted 20 mm (0.79 in) Oerlikon MG FF cannons that earned it the nickname kanonenvogel (literally, cannon bird).

A prototype, known as the V5, was designed and built by engineer Wernher von Braun, who would later design the V-2 rocket. This variant of the fighter He 112 was powered by an additional rocket engine. First flown in early 1937, the He 112 V5 demonstrated the feasibility of rocket power for aircraft.

In July, both V5 and V6 were completed. V5 was identical to V4, with the Jumo 210D engine. V6, on the other hand, was completed as the pattern aircraft for the A series production run, and thus included the 210C engine instead of the more powerful, but less available 210D. The only other change was a modification to the radiator, but this would not appear on later A-0 series models. V6 suffered a forced landing on 1 August and was repaired and joined V4 for testing in October.

The last of the prototype A-0 series was V8, which was completed in October. It switched engines entirely and mounted the Daimler-Benz DB 600Aa, along with a three-bladed, fully adjustable, all-metal propeller. The engine was a huge change for the aircraft, producing 716 kW (960 hp) for takeoff and had 33.9 L (2,069 in^{3}) displacement at 686 kg (1,510 lb), compared that to the Jumo 210D's 680 PS (500 kW) from 19.7 L (1,202 in^{3}) at about the same weight. V8 was seen primarily as a testbed for the new engine, and more importantly, its cooling systems. The DB used a dry liner in the engine that resulted in poor heat flow, so more of the heat was removed by oil as opposed to water, requiring changes to the cooling systems.

In March 1937, the aircraft was assigned to rocket propulsion tests at Peenemünde. It completed these tests later that summer and was returned to the factory, where it was converted back into a normal model. At the end of the year, it was sent to Spain, where it was seriously damaged on 18 July 1938. Once again, it was put back together and was flying four months later. Its fate after this time is not recorded.

=== Production models ===
At this point, the prototype stage was ostensibly over, and Heinkel continued building the A-0 as production line models. The naming changed, adding a production number to the end of the name, so the next six examples were known as He 112 A-01 through A-06. All of these included the 210C engine and were essentially identical to V6, with the exception of the radiator.

These aircraft were used in just as varied a manner as the earlier V series had been. A-01 flew in October 1936 and was used as the prototype for a future 112 C-0 carrier-based aircraft. It was later destroyed during rocket tests. A-02 flew in November, and then joined the earlier V models at Rechlin-Lärz Airfield for further testing in the contest. A-03 and A-04 were both completed in December, A-03 was a show aircraft and was flown by Heinkel pilots at various air shows and exhibitions, A-04 was kept at Heinkel for various tests.

The last two models of the A-0 series, A-05 and A-06, were completed in March 1937. They were both shipped to Japan as the initial machines of the 30 for the Imperial Japanese Navy.

== He 112B ==
=== Prototypes ===
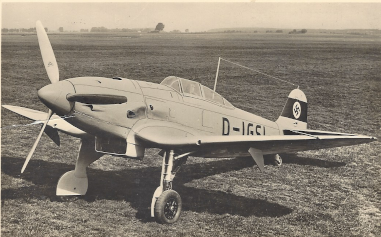
Prototype V9 D-IGSI

In October 1936, the RLM changed the orders for the zero series 112s, instructing Heinkel to complete any A-0s already under construction and then switch the remaining aircraft to an updated design. This gave Heinkel a chance to improve the He 112, which it did by completely redesigning it into an almost entirely new aircraft called the He 112B. It is at this point that it became a modern design that could compete head-to-head with the Bf 109.

The He 112B had a redesigned and cut-down rear fuselage, a new fin and rudder and a completely enclosed cockpit with a bubble-style canopy. The canopy was somewhat more complex than later bubble designs; instead of having two pieces with the majority sliding to the rear, the He 112B canopy was in three pieces, the middle sliding back and over a fixed rear section. Even with the additional framing, the He 112 had excellent visibility for its day. Armament was also standardized on the B model with two 7.92 mm (.312 in) MG 17 machine guns in the sides of the cowling with 500 rpg and two 20 mm MG FF cannons in the wings with 60 rpg. For aiming, the cockpit included the new Revi 3B reflector gunsight.

The first B series airframe to be completed was V7 in October 1936. V7 used the DB 600Aa engine like the A-series V8, and it also used the original V1 style larger wing. This wing was later replaced with a smaller one but instead of the clipped version from the earlier V models, a new single-spar fully elliptical wing was produced. This design became standard for the entire B series. V7 was turned over to von Braun in April 1937 for yet more rocket tests and managed to survive the experience. It was then returned in the summer and sent to Rechlin where it was used as a test aircraft.

The next type was V9 which flew in July 1937, powered by the 680 PS (500 kW) Jumo 210D engine. V9 can be considered to be the "real" B series prototype, as V7 had received the DB 600Aa originally for experimental reasons. The entire surface was now flush riveted and the aircraft had several other aerodynamic refinements. The radiator was changed again, this time to a semi-retractable design for reduced drag in flight. The aircraft also underwent a weight reduction program which reduced the empty weight to 1,617 kg (3,565 lb).

As a result of all of these changes, the V9 had a maximum speed of 485 km/h (301 mph) at 4,000 m (13,120 ft), and 430 km/h (270 mph) at sea level. This was a full 20 km/h (10 mph) faster than the contemporary Bf 109B. Nevertheless, by this time, the Bf 109 was already being mass-produced and the RLM saw no need for another similar aircraft. It is also worth noting that users of the aircraft generally found it impossible to reach this speed and rarely managed to exceed 418 km/h (260 mph).

The RLM had already contracted for another six He 112s, so production of the prototypes continued. V10 was supposed to receive the 670 kW (960 hp) Junkers Jumo 211A (Junker's new DB 600 competitor) but the engine was not available in time and V10 instead received the new 876 kW (1,175 hp) DB 601Aa. The engine drove V10 to 570 km/h (350 mph) and increased climb rate significantly. V11 was also supposed to get the Jumo 211A but instead received the DB 600Aa.

The last prototype, V12, was actually an airframe taken off the B-1 series production line (which had started by this point). The Jumo 210D was replaced with the new fuel-injected 210Ga, which improved performance of the engine to 522 kW (700 hp) for takeoff, and a sustained output of 503 kW (675 hp) at the reasonably high altitude of 4,700 m (15,420 ft). Better yet, the Ga also decreased fuel consumption, thus increasing the aircraft's endurance. The new engine gave V12 such a boost that it became the pattern aircraft for the planned B-2 series production.

With all of these different versions and experimental engine fits, it might seem like every aircraft differed significantly but with the exception of the engines, the Bs were identical. Due to the shortage of just about any German engine at the time and the possibility that advanced versions could be blocked for export, various models had to be designed with different installations. Thus the B models were different only in their engine, the Jumo 210C in the He 112 B-0, the Jumo 210D in the B-1, and the Jumo 210Ga for the B-2.

=== Production models ===
In order to show off the He 112, V9 spent much of the later half of 1937 being flown by pilots from all over the world. It was also sent around Europe for tours and air shows. The effort was a success and orders quickly started coming in. However, a variety of problems meant few of these were ever delivered.

The first order was from the Imperial Japanese Navy, which had a requirement for a fast-climbing interceptor to deal with Tupolev SB bombers over China. After seeing V9 in flight, it quickly placed an order for 24 112Bs, with an option for 48 more. The first four were shipped in December 1937, another eight in the spring, and promises for the rest to arrive in May. Before delivery, the Luftwaffe unexpectedly took over 12 of the aircraft to bolster its forces during the Sudetenland Crisis. The aircraft were then returned to Heinkel in November, but the Japanese, who were unhappy with the high maintenance workload and lower manoeuvrability compared with fighters like the Mitsubishi A5M, refused to accept them this late and Heinkel was left holding the aircraft.

In November 1937, an Austrian delegation came to see the aircraft, led by Generaloberst Alexander Löhr, Command-in-Chief of the Luftstreitkräfte (Austrian Air Force). Test pilot Hans Schalk flew both the Bf 109 and the He 112V9 back to back. Although he felt that both models performed the same, the Heinkel had more balanced steering pressures and better equipment possibilities. They placed an order on 20 December for 42 He 112Bs. Pending the license for the MG FF cannon, these aircraft would remove the cannon and add six THM 10/I bomb shackles which carried small 10 kg (22 lb) anti-personnel bombs. The order was later reduced to 36 examples due to a lack of funds (the He 112B cost 163,278 ℛ︁ℳ︁), but the aircraft were never delivered due to the annexation of Austria in the March 1938 Anschluss.

Spain was so impressed with the He 112's performance during evaluation in the civil war that the Spanish Air Force purchased the 12 aircraft in early 1938, and later increased the order by another six (some sources say five). Of the first 12, two were shipped in November, another six in January, and the rest in April.

In April, it looked like Yugoslavia would be the next user of the He 112. It placed an order for 30 aircraft but later cancelled the order and decided to produce other designs under license.

Finland appeared to be another potential customer. From January–March 1938, the famous Finnish pilot Gustaf Erik Magnusson travelled to Germany to gain experience in new tactics. He had been on similar tours in France in the past and was interested to see how the Germans were training their pilots. On a visit to the Heinkel plant in Marienehe, he flew the He 112 and reported it to be the best aircraft he had flown. In May, Heinkel sent the first of the He 112 B-1s to Finland to join an air show. It remained for the next week and was flown by a number of pilots, including Magnusson, who had since returned to Finland. Although all of the pilots liked the aircraft, the cost was so high that the Suomen Ilmavoimat (Finnish Air Force) decided to stick with the much less expensive Fokker D.XXI.

A similar setback would accompany sales efforts targeting the Dutch Air Force, which was looking to purchase 36 fighters to form two new squadrons. A He 112 B-1 arrived for testing on 12 July and quickly proved to be the best aircraft in the competition. Nevertheless, it decided to purchase the locally built (and rather outdated) Koolhoven F.K.58 instead. In the end, the F.K.58s were never delivered because the factory was bombed on 10 May 1940.

Fortunes would seem to be reversed with Hungary. In June 1938, three pilots of the Magyar Királyi Honvéd Légierö (Royal Hungarian Home Defense Air Force or MKHL) were sent to Heinkel to study V9. They were impressed with what they saw, and on 7 September, an order was placed for 36 aircraft, as well as an offer to license the design for local construction. Through a variety of political mishaps, only three aircraft were ever delivered and licensed production never happened.

The final and perhaps most successful customer for the He 112B was Romania. The Forţã Aeronauticã Regalã Românã (Royal Romanian Air Force) ordered 24 aircraft in April 1939 and increased the order to 30 on 18 August. Deliveries started in June, with the last being delivered on 30 September.

By this point, the war had broken out and with better models on the market – including Heinkel's own He 100 – no one else was interested in purchasing the design. The production line was closed after a total of only 98 aircraft, 85 of those being the B series models.

== He 112R ==
=== Early experiments with rocket propulsion ===
In 1931, the Army Weapons Office testing ground at Kummersdorf had taken over research into liquid-fuel rockets. In 1932, Wernher von Braun designed a rocket of this kind which used high percentage spirit and liquid oxygen. von Braun was interested in evaluating an aircraft with a rocket motor propulsion system. Initially the highest levels at the Army High Command and the Reich Air Ministry (RLM) were opposed to such "fantasies", as they called them. Many maintained that an aircraft driven by a tail thrust would experience a change in the centre of gravity and flip over but Ernst Heinkel offered support and provided an He 112 fuselage shell less wings for standing tests.

In 1936 von Braun began trials. Late in 1936 Erich Warsitz was seconded by the RLM to Wernher von Braun and Ernst Heinkel, because he had been recognized as one of the most experienced test pilots of the time, and because he also was technically proficient. For tests, the RLM lent Neuhardenberg, a large field about 70 kilometres east of Berlin, listed as a reserve airfield in the event of war. Since Neuhardenberg had no buildings or facilities, a number of marquees were erected to house the aircraft. In the spring of 1937, the Kummersdorf Club transferred to Neuhardenberg and continued the standing trials with the He 112 fuselage. In June 1937 Erich Warsitz undertook the initial flight testing of the He 112 fitted with the rocket engine. Despite a wheels-up landing with the fuselage on fire, it proved that the aircraft could be flown satisfactorily.

Hellmuth Walter at Kiel had been commissioned by the RLM to build a rocket engine for the He 112, so there were two different new rocket motor designs at Neuhardenberg; whereas von Braun's engines were powered by alcohol and liquid oxygen, Walter engines used hydrogen peroxide with calcium permanganate catalyst. Instead of a flame, the Walter produced a hot vapour from a chemical reaction generating thrust and giving high speed. The subsequent flights with the He 112 used the Walter-rocket instead of von Braun's; it was more reliable, simpler to operate and the dangers to test pilot Erich Warsitz and the machine were less. After the conclusion of the He 112 tests using both rocket motors, the marquees at Neuhardenberg were dismantled at the end of 1937. This coincided with the construction of Peenemünde.

== Operational service ==
=== Condor Legion ===
When it was clear the 112 was losing the contest to the Bf 109, Heinkel offered to re-equip V6 with 20 mm cannon armament as an experimental aircraft. She was then broken down and shipped to Spain on 9 December and assigned to Versuchsjagdgruppe 88, a group within the Condor Legion devoted to testing new aircraft and joined three V-series Bf 109s which were also in testing.

Wilhelm Balthasar, later a Battle of Britain ace pilot, used it to attack an armoured train and an armoured car. Other pilots flew it, but the engine seized during landing in July and she was written off.

For the annexation of the Sudetenland, every flight-worthy fighter was pressed into service. The batch of He 112Bs for the Japanese Navy was taken over but not used before the end of the crisis and shipped to Japan to fulfill orders.

The Japanese rejected the He 112 as a fighter but took 30 for training duties and V11 with its DB 600Aa was used for testing.

=== Spain ===
The Spanish government purchased 12 He 112Bs. This increased to 19. The He 112s were to operate as top cover for Fiat fighters in the opening stages of the Civil War, the Fiat having considerably worse altitude performance. In the event, only a single kill was made with the He 112 as a fighter and it was moved onto ground-attack work.

During World War II, when Allied forces landed in North Africa, Spanish forces in Morocco intercepted stray aircraft of both Allied and German forces. None of these incidents resulted in losses. In 1943, one He 112 of Grupo nº27 attacked the tail-end aircraft of 11 Lockheed P-38s forcing it down in Algeria after they re-entered French territory having crossed into Spanish Morocco. By 1944, the aircraft were largely grounded due to a lack of fuel and maintenance.

=== Hungary ===
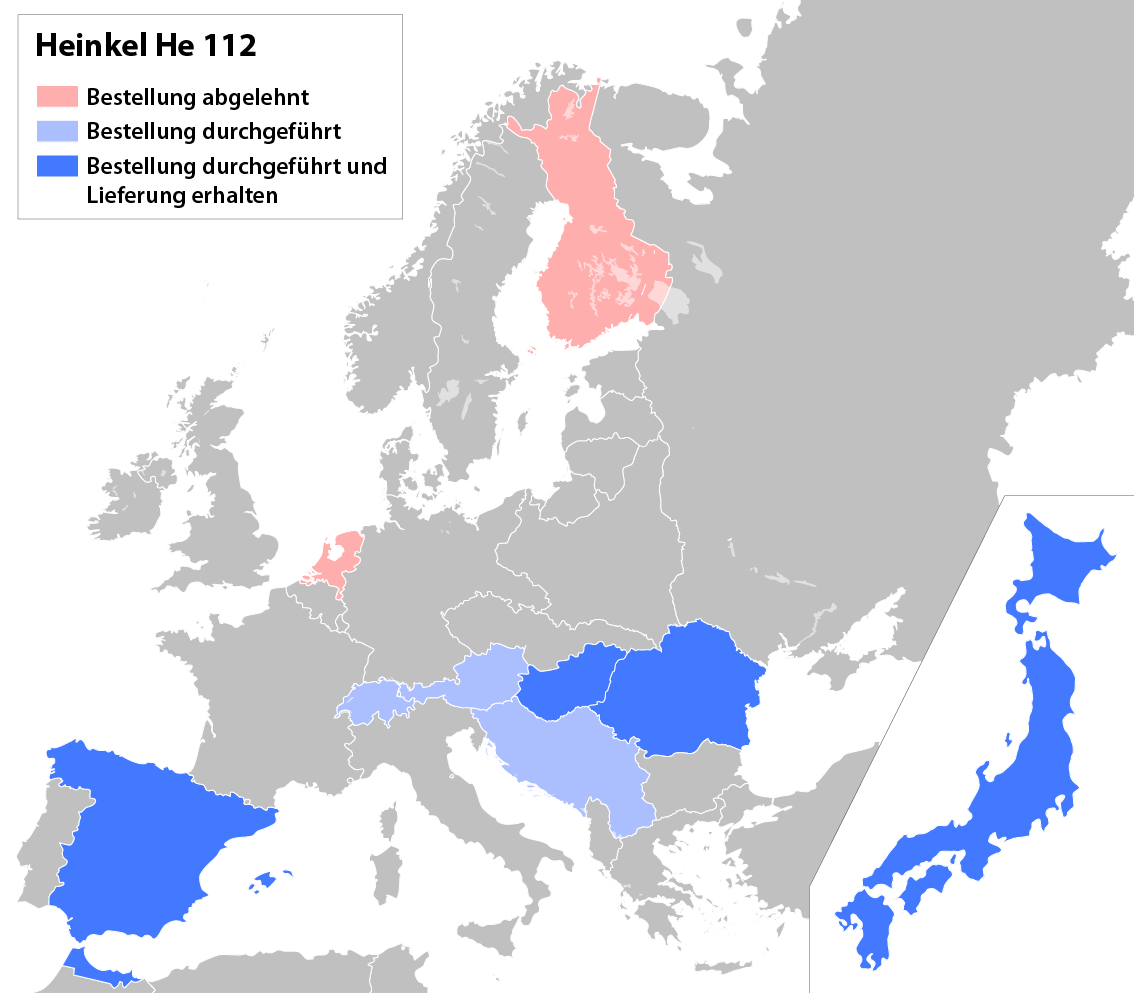

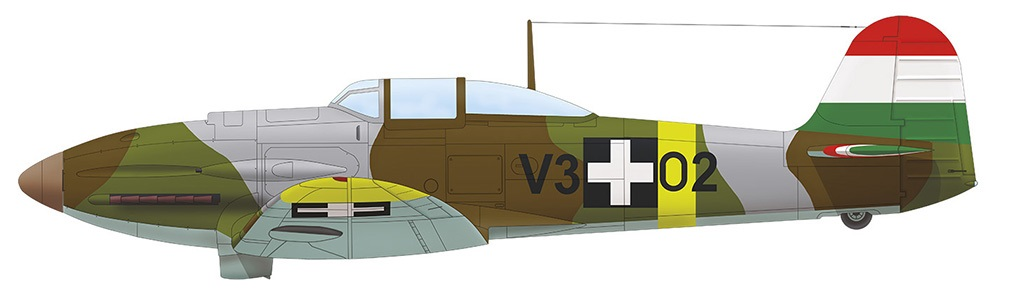
Heinkel He 112E (V3 + 02) of the Hungarian Royal Air Force (MKHL - Magyar Királyi Honvéd Légierö), 1942

Like the Germans, Hungary had stiff regulations imposed on its armed forces with the signing of the Treaty of Trianon. In August 1938, the armed forces were re-formed, and with Austria (historically her partner for centuries) being incorporated into Germany, Hungary found herself in the German sphere.

One of the highest priorities for the forces was to re-equip the Hungarian Air Force (Magyar Királyi Honvéd Légierő or MKHL) as soon as possible. Of the various aircraft being considered, the He 112B eventually won out over the competition, and on 7 September, an order was placed for 36 aircraft. The Heinkel production line was just starting, and, with Japan and Spain in the queue, it would be some time before the aircraft could be delivered. Repeated pleas to be moved to the top of the queue failed.

Germany had to refuse the first order at the beginning of 1939 because of its claimed neutrality in the Hungarian/Romanian dispute over Transylvania. In addition, the RLM refused to license the 20 mm MG FF cannon to the Hungarians, likely as a form of political pressure. This later insult did not cause a problem, because they planned to replace it with the locally designed 20 mm Danuvia cannon anyway.

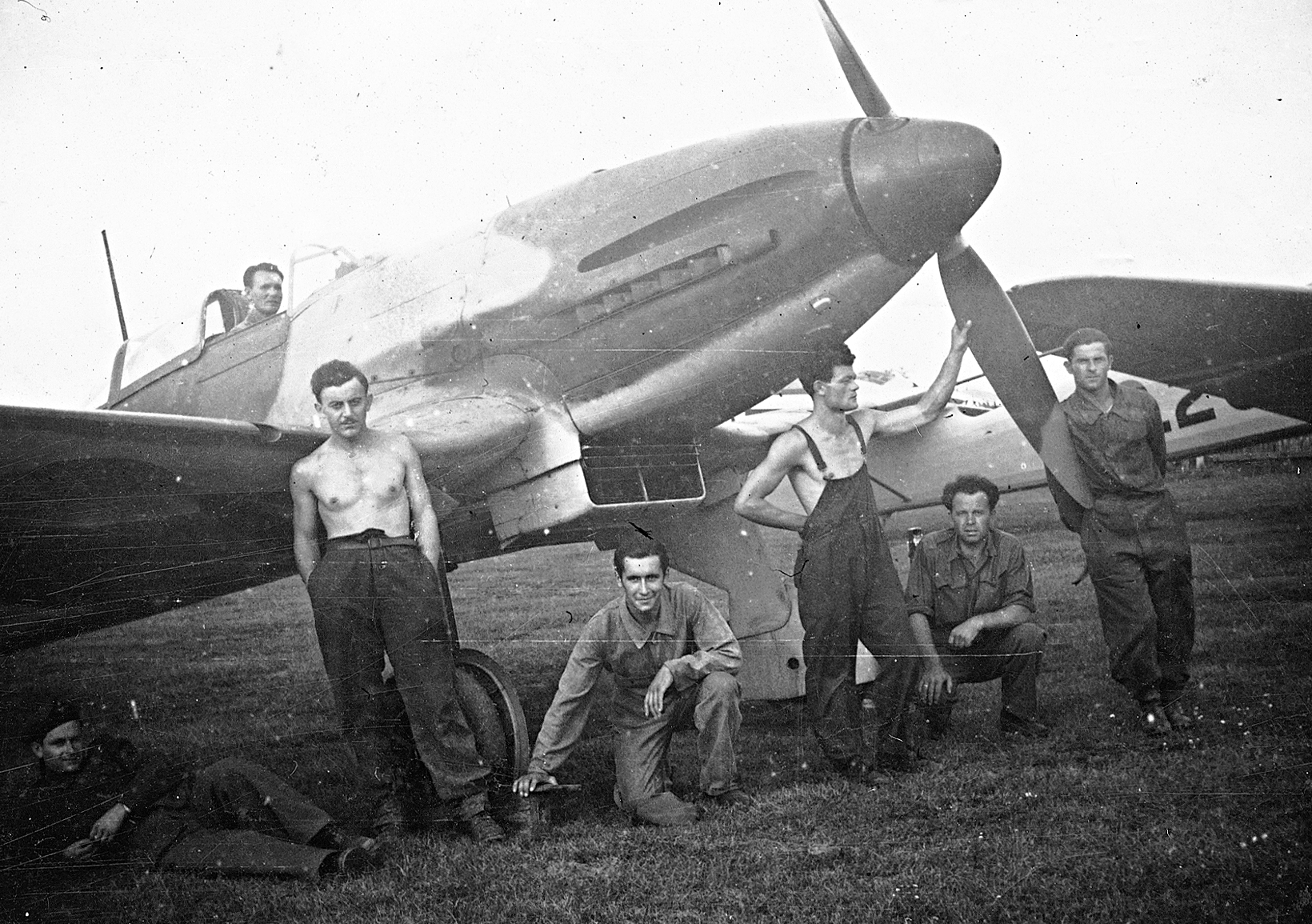
Hungarian He 112B in 1940

V9 was sent to Hungary as a demonstrator after a tour of Romania and arrived on 5 February 1939. It was test flown by a number of pilots over the next week, and on 14 February, they replaced the propeller with a new three-bladed Junkers design (licensed from Hamilton). While being tested against a CR.32 that day, V9 crashed. On 10 March, a new He 112 B-1/U2 arrived to replace the V9 and was flown by a number of pilots at different fighter units. It was during this time that the Hungarian pilots started to complain about the underpowered engine, as they found that they could reach a top speed of only 430 km/h (270 mph) with the Jumo 210Ea.

With the Japanese and Spanish orders filled, things were looking up for Hungary. However, at that point, Romania placed its order and was placed at the front of the queue. It appeared that the Hungarian production machines might never arrive, so the MKHL started pressing for a license to build the aircraft locally. In May, the Hungarian Manfréd Weiss company in Budapest received the license for the aircraft, and on 1 June, an order was placed for 12 aircraft. Heinkel agreed to deliver a Jumo 210Ga-powered aircraft to serve as a pattern aircraft.

As it turns out, the He 112 B-2 was never delivered; two more of the B-1/U2s with the Jumo 210Ea were sent instead. On arrival in Hungary, the 7.92 mm (.312 in) MG 17 machine guns were removed and replaced with the local 8 mm (.315 in) Gebauer 1939.M machine guns, and bomb racks were added. The resulting fit was similar to those originally ordered by Austria. Throughout this time, the complaints about the engines were being addressed by continued attempts to license one of the newer 30 L (1,831 in^{3})-class engines, the Junkers Jumo 211A or the DB 600Aa.

On 30 March 1939, the He 100 V8 took the world absolute speed record, but in stories about the record attempt, the aircraft was referred to as the He 112U. Upon hearing of the record, the Hungarians decided to switch production to this "new version" of the 112, which was based on the newer engines. Then in August, the commander-in-chief of the MKHL recommended that the 112 be purchased as the standard fighter for Hungary (although likely referring to the earlier versions, not the "112U").

At this point, the engine issue came to a head. It was clear that no production line aircraft would ever reach Hungary, and now that the war was underway, the RLM was refusing to allow their export anyway. Shipments of the Jumo 211 or DB 601 were not even able to fulfil German needs; export of the engine for locally built airframes was likewise out of the question.

By September, the ongoing negotiations with the RLM for the license to build the engines locally stalled, and as a result, the MKHL ordered Manfred-Weiss to stop tooling up for the production line aircraft. The license was eventually canceled in December. The MKHL turned to the Italians and purchased the Fiat CR.32 and Reggiane Re.2000. The latter would be modified into the MÁVAG Héja, becoming the backbone of the MKHL for the early part of the war. From October 1942, the Messerschmitt Bf 109 (F-4 and G variants) would become the backbone of the MKHL.

Nevertheless, the three He 112 B-1/U2 aircraft continued to serve. In the summer of 1940, tensions with Romania over Transylvania started to heat up again and the entire MKHL was placed on alert on 27 June. On 21 August, the He 112s were moved forward to the Debrecen airfield to protect a vital railway link. The next week, a peaceful resolution was found, and the settlement was signed in Vienna on 30 August. The He 112s returned home the following week.

By 1941, the aircraft were ostensibly assigned to defend the Manfréd Weiss plant but were actually used for training. When Allied bomber raids started in the spring of 1944, the aircraft were no longer airworthy, and it appears all were destroyed in a massive raid on the Budapest-Ferihegy airport on 9 August 1944.

In the summer of 1939, possibly as a result of the He 112B deal having difficulties, it was planned to switch the production lines to build a Hungarian-designed aircraft called the Weiss Manfréd WM-23 Ezüst Nyíl ("Silver Arrow"). This aircraft's wing design likely took some inspiration from the He 112, as it also had an elliptical shape and a slight inverted-gull wing design. Unlike the He 112's wings, the WM-23's wings would be made of wood skinned with plywood. The fuselage was made of plywood over a welded steel tube frame, and the engine was a 768 kW (1,030 hp) Weiss Manfréd WM K-14B; a licensed derivative of the Gnome-Rhône Mistral-Major radial. It would be armed with a pair of 12.7 mm Gebauer 1940.M GKM machine guns in the upper cowling and two 8 mm Gebauer 1939.M machine guns in the wings.

The higher-powered engine made the WM-23 considerably faster than the He 112. It also performed well during testing and was said to have great acceleration and manoeuvrability. Nevertheless, work proceeded slowly as indigenous fighter development was still new in Hungary and several issues such as vibrations had to be fixed. Only one prototype was built and the project was eventually cancelled outright when the prototype crashed on 21 April 1942 due to intense vibrations breaking off an aileron. Instead of further developing and finishing the WM-23 project, it was decided to stop it and focus on producing the MÁVAG Héja and later the Messerschmitt Bf 109G.

=== Japan ===
The Imperial Japanese Navy purchased twelve Heinkel He 112B-0 fighters, which it designated both as the Heinkel A7He1 and as the Navy Type He Air Defense Fighter. The Japanese flew the A7He1 briefly during the Second Sino-Japanese War but phased it out of service before the attack on Pearl Harbor in December 1941 in favor of the Mitsubishi A6M Zero. Assuming it still to be in Japanese use, however, the Allies assigned the reporting name Jerry to the A7He1 during World War II.

=== Romania ===
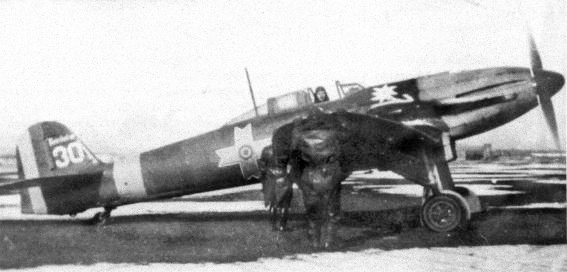
A Heinkel He 112 in ARR Romanian livery at Focșani airport in the end of 1942.

Germany saw Romania as an important supplier of war materials, notably oil and grain. Looking to secure Romania as an ally, throughout the middle of the 1930s, Germany applied increasing pressure in a variety of forms, best summed up as the "carrot and stick" approach. The carrot came in the form of generous trade agreements for a variety of products and by the late 1930s, Germany formed about ½ of all of Romania's trade. The stick came in the form of Germany siding with Romania's enemies in various disputes.

On 26 June 1940, the Soviet Union gave Romania a 24-hour ultimatum to return Bessarabia and cede northern Bukovina, even though the latter had never even been a part of Russia. Germany's ambassador to Romania advised the king to submit, and he did. In August, Bulgaria reclaimed southern Dobruja, with German and Soviet backing. Later that month, German and Italian foreign ministers met with Romanian diplomats in Vienna and presented them with an ultimatum to accept the ceding of northern Transylvania to Hungary.

Romania was placed in an increasingly bad position as its local allies were gobbled up by Germany, and its larger allies' (Britain and France) assurances of help proved empty, as demonstrated by their lack of action during the German-Soviet Invasion of Poland. Soon the king was forced from the throne and a pro-German government was formed.

With Romania now firmly in the German sphere of influence, its efforts to re-arm for the coming war were suddenly strongly backed. Romania's primary concern was its air force, the ARR. Its fighter force at the time consisted of just over 100 Polish PZL P.11 aircraft, primarily the P.11b or the locally built f model, and 30 more modern PZL P.24E. Although these aircraft were among the most advanced fighters in the world at the time Romania acquired them in the mid-1930s, by 1940 they were outclassed by latest designs.

In April 1939, the ARR was offered the Bf 109 as soon as production was meeting German demands. In the meantime, it could take over 24 He 112Bs that were already built. The ARR jumped at the chance and then increased the order to 30 aircraft.

Late in April, a group of Romanian pilots arrived at Heinkel for conversion training, which went slowly because of the advanced nature of the He 112 in comparison to the PZL P.11. When the training was complete, the pilots returned home in the cockpits of their new aircraft. The aircraft, all of them B-1s or B-2s, were "delivered" in this manner starting in July and ending in October. Two of the aircraft were lost, one in a fatal accident during training in Germany on 7 September, and another suffered minor damage on landing while being delivered and was later repaired at SET in Romania.

When the first aircraft started arriving, they were tested competitively against the locally designed IAR 80 prototype. The Romanian fighter proved to be superior to the He 112B in almost every way. At the same time, the test flights revealed a number of disadvantages of the He 112, notably the underpowered engine and poor speed. The result of the fly-off was that the IAR 80 was ordered into immediate production, and orders for any additional He 112s were cancelled.

By 15 September, enough of the aircraft had arrived to re-equip Escadrila 10 and 11. The two squadrons were formed into the Grupul 5 vânãtoare (5th Fighter Group) within the Flotila 1 Vânătoare (1st Fighter Flotilla), responsible for the defense of Bucharest. In October, they were renamed as the 51st and 52nd squadrons, still forming the 5th. The pilots had not been a part of the group that had been trained at Heinkel, so they started working their way toward the He 112 using Nardi FN.305 monoplane trainers. The training lasted until the spring of 1940 when a single additional He 112 B-2 was delivered as a replacement for the one that crashed in Germany the previous September.

During the troubles with Hungary, Hungarian Ju 86s and He 70s started making reconnaissance flights over Romanian territory. Repeated attempts to intercept them failed because of the low speed of the PZL P.11 aircraft that equipped the 2nd Fighter Flotilla. In order to combat this, the 51st Fighter Squadron deployed to Transylvania to aid the 2nd Fighter Flotilla. Six He 112s were deployed to the Someșeni airfield, and another six to the Nușfalău airfield. On 28 August, a Romanian He 112 attacked and damaged a Hungarian Ca.135bis bomber under controversial circumstances. The Hungarian version of events claims that the bomber was on a training mission in Hungarian airspace and the Romanian He 112 had entered Hungarian airspace and damaged the bomber which landed safely at an airfield in Debrecen. This incident caused outrage among Hungarian aviators. According to the Romanian version of events, Hungarian aircraft entered Romanian airspace, so Romanian fighters intervened and Locotenent Nicolae Polizu-Micșunești engaged the bomber over Săcueni. Several of his 20 mm rounds hit the bomber, which was forced down and crash-landed near Berveni, north of Carei. The crew of the bomber consisting of Captain Ghenos Janosz and Lieutenant Toldes Gyula were taken prisoner.

When Germany prepared to invade the USSR in 1941, Romania joined it in an effort to regain the territories lost the year before. The ARR, with the Air Combat Group, worked with Luftflotte 4, and in preparation for the invasion, Grupul 5 Vânãtoare was sent to Moldavia. At the time, 24 of the He 112s were flyable. Three were left at their home base at Pipera to complete repairs, two others had been lost to accidents, and the fate of the others is unknown. On 15 June, the aircraft were moved again, to Foscani-North in northern Moldavia.

With the opening of the war on 22 June, the He 112s were in the air at 1050 supporting an attack by Potez 63s of Grupul 2 bombardment on the Soviet airfields at Bolgrad and Bulgãrica. Although some flak was encountered on the way to and over Bolgrad, the attack was successful and a number of Soviet aircraft were bombed on the ground. By the time they reached Bulgãrica, fighters were in the air waiting for them, and as a result the 12 He 112s were met by about 30 I-16s. The results of this combat were mixed; Sublocotenent Teodor Moscu shot down one of a pair of I-16s still taking off. When he was pulling out, he hit another in a head-on pass and it crashed into the Danube. He was set upon by several I-16s and received several hits, his fuel tanks were punctured but did not seal. Losing fuel rapidly, he formed up with his wingman and managed to put down at the Romanian airfield at Bârlad. His aircraft was later repaired and returned to duty. Of the bombers, three of the 13 dispatched were shot down.

Over the next few days, the He 112s would be used primarily as ground-attack aircraft, where their heavy armament was considered to be more important than their ability to fight in the air. Typical missions would start before dawn and would have the Heinkels strafe Soviet airbases. Later in the day, they would be sent on search and destroy missions, looking primarily for artillery and trains.

Losses were heavy, most not due to combat, but simply because the aircraft were flying an average of three missions a day and were not receiving adequate maintenance. This problem affected all of the ARR, which did not have the field maintenance logistics worked out at the time. On 29 July, a report on the readiness of the air forces listed only 14 He 112s in flyable condition and another eight repairable. As a result, the aircraft of the 52nd were folded into the 51st to form a full-strength squadron on 13 August. The men of the 52nd were merged with the 42nd who flew IAR.80s and were soon sent home to receive IAR.80s of their own. A report from August on the He 112 rated it very poorly, once again noting its lack of power and poor speed.

For a time, the 51st continued in a front-line role, although it saw little combat. When Odessa fell on 16 October, the Romanian war effort ostensibly ended, and the aircraft were considered to be no longer needed at the front. 15 were kept at Odessa and the rest were released to Romania for training duty (although they seem to have seen no use). On 1 November, the 51st moved to Tatarka and then returned to Odessa on the 25th, performing coastal patrol duties all the while. On 1 July 1942, the 51st returned to Pipera and stood down after a year in action.

On 19 July one of the He 112s took to the air to intercept Soviet bombers in what was the first night mission by a Romanian aircraft. As the Soviets were clearly gearing up for a night offensive on Bucharest, the 51st was then re-equipped with Bf 110 night fighters and became the only Romanian night fighter squadron.

By 1943, the IAR.80 was no longer competitive, and the ARR started an overdue move to a newer fighter, the Bf 109G. The He 112s were relegated to training. The inline engine and general layout of the German designs were considered similar enough to make it useful in this role, and as a result the He 112s came under the control of the Corpul 3 Aerian (3rd Air Corps). Several more of the He 112s were destroyed in accidents during this time. It soldiered on in this role into late 1944, even after Romania had changed sides and joined the Allies.

== Specifications (He 112 A-0 V4) ==
Data from Messerschmitt Bf 109: The Design and Operational History, Aircraft of the Luftwaffe, 1935–1945: An Illustrated Guide

General characteristics

- Crew: One
- Length: 9 m (29 ft 6 in)
- Wingspan: 11.5 m (37 ft 9 in)
- Height: 3.7 m (12 ft 2 in)
- Wing area: 23.2 m^{2} (250 sq ft)
- Airfoil: root: Heinkel 16.5%; tip: Heinkel 16.5%
- Empty weight: 1,680 kg (3,704 lb)
- Max takeoff weight: 2,230 kg (4,916 lb)
- Powerplant: 1 × Junkers Jumo 210Da V-12 liquid-cooled piston engine, 514 kW (689 hp)
- Propellers: 3-bladed variable-pitch propeller

Performance

- Maximum speed: 488 km/h (303 mph, 263 kn) at 3,500 m (11,500 ft)
- Range: 1,100 km (680 mi, 590 nmi)
- Service ceiling: 8,000 m (26,000 ft)
- Wing loading: 102.5 kg/m^{2} (21.0 lb/sq ft)

Armament

- 2 × 7.92 mm (0.31 in) MG 17 machine guns in the engine cowling
- 2 × 20 mm (0.79 in) MG FF cannon in the outer wing.

== See also ==
Aircraft of comparable role, configuration, and era

- Curtiss P-36 Hawk
- Hawker Hurricane
- Heinkel He 100
- Lavochkin-Gorbunov-Gudkov LaGG-1
- Mikoyan-Gurevich MiG-1
- Messerschmitt Bf 109
- Morane-Saulnier M.S.406
- Supermarine Spitfire
- Yakovlev Yak-1

Related lists

- List of World War II military aircraft of Germany
- List of aircraft of World War II
