= Arado Ar 67 =

German fighter plane

Ar 67
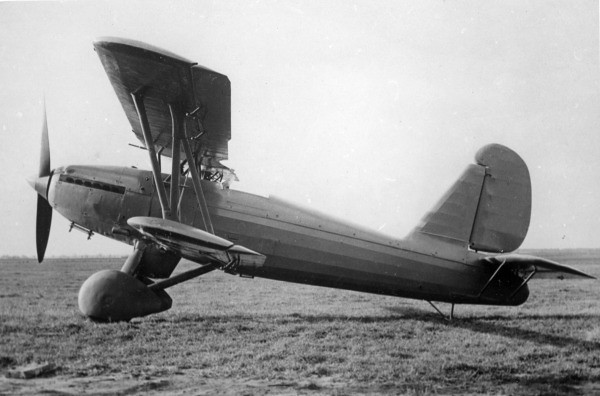

General information
- Type: Biplane Fighter
- Manufacturer: Arado Flugzeugwerke
- Primary user: Luftwaffe
- Number built: 1

History
- Manufactured: 1933
- First flight: 1933

The Arado Ar 67 was the single-seat biplane fighter successor to the Ar 65.

The Ar 67 appeared in 1933 and was developed alongside the Ar 68. The Ar 67 was considerably smaller and lighter than the Ar 65. But the Ar 68 proved to be a better performer, and all further work on the Ar 67 was discontinued after only one prototype was built.

== Specifications (Ar 67a) ==
Data from Warplanes of the Third Reich

General characteristics

- Crew: 1
- Length: 7.9 m (25 ft 11 in)
- Wingspan: 9.68 m (31 ft 9 in)
- Height: 3.1 m (10 ft 2 in)
- Wing area: 25.06 m^{2} (269.7 sq ft)
- Empty weight: 1,270 kg (2,800 lb)
- Gross weight: 1,660 kg (3,660 lb)
- Powerplant: 1 × Rolls-Royce Kestrel VI , 390 kW (525 hp) for take-off

450 kW (600 hp) at 3,400 m (11,000 ft)
480 kW (640 hp) at 4,300 m (14,000 ft)

Performance

- Maximum speed: 295 km/h (183 mph, 159 kn) at 2,370 m (7,790 ft)

340 km/h (210 mph) at 3,770 m (12,370 ft)

- Service ceiling: 9,300 m (30,510 ft)
- Rate of climb: 8 m/s (1,600 ft/min)
- Time to altitude: 1,000 m (3,300 ft) in 2.1 minutes

5,000 m (16,000 ft) in 9.5 minutes

Armament

- Guns: 2 × 7.92 mm (.312 in) MG 17 machine guns with 500 rpg (proposed)

== See also ==
Related lists

- List of military aircraft of Germany
