= Albatros L103 =

Type of aircraft

L 103

General information
- Type: Experimental aircraft
- Manufacturer: Albatros Flugzeugwerke
- Number built: 1

History
- First flight: 1933

The Albatros L 103 (company designation) / Albatros Al 103 (RLM designation) was a German experimental aircraft of the 1930s. It was a parasol-wing landplane of conventional configuration, seating the pilot and flight test observer in separate, open cockpits. The Al 103 was used to test variations in sweepback, dihedral and tailplane area.

== Specifications (L 103) ==
Data from & German Aircraft between 1919 - 1945

General characteristics

- Crew: 2
- Length: 11.15 m (36 ft 7 in)
- Wingspan: 15.4 m (50 ft 6 in) with 10° sweepback
- Height: 3.66 m (12 ft 0 in)
- Wing area: 32.86 m^{2} (353.7 sq ft)
- Aspect ratio: 7.22
- Empty weight: 925 kg (2,039 lb)
- Gross weight: 1,450 kg (3,197 lb)
- Fuel capacity: 100 kg (220 lb) + Oil 10 kg (22 lb)
- Powerplant: 1 × Argus As 10C inverted V-8, air-cooled piston engine, 176.5 kW (236.7 hp)

Performance

- Maximum speed: 180 km/h (110 mph, 97 kn) at sea level
- Range: 322 km (200 mi, 174 nmi)
- Endurance: 2 hours
- Service ceiling: 4,000 m (13,000 ft)
- Rate of climb: 2.7 m/s (530 ft/min)
- Wing loading: 44.12 kg/m^{2} (9.04 lb/sq ft)
