= Messerschmitt Bf 163 =

German reconnaissance aircraft prototype

Bf 163
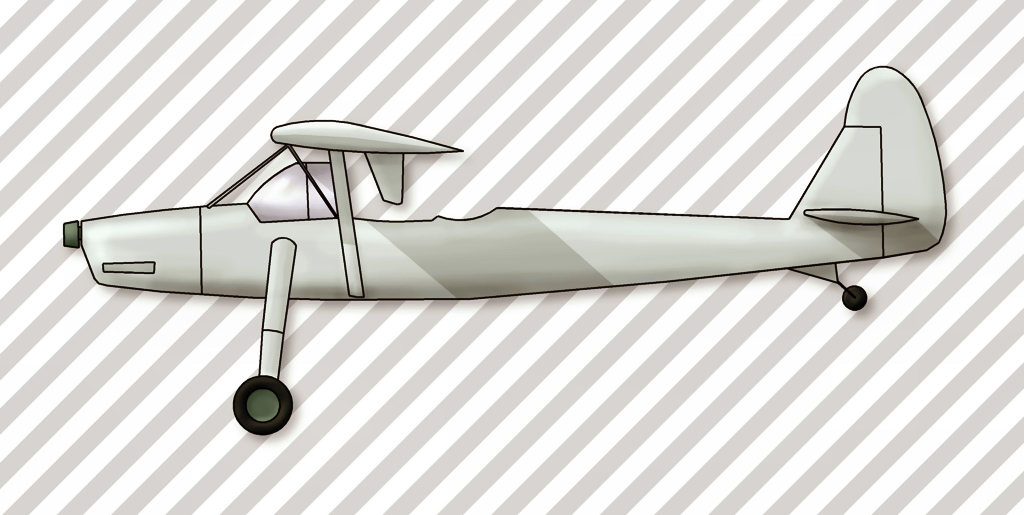
- Messerschmitt Bf 163 sketch

General information
- Type: STOL reconnaissance and observation aircraft
- Manufacturer: Weser Flugzeugbau
- Designer: Bayerische Flugzeugwerke (Messerschmitt)
- Number built: 1

History
- First flight: 19 February 1938

The Messerschmitt Bf 163 was a STOL aircraft designed by BFW and built by Weser Flugzeugbau before World War II.

== Design and development ==
During the autumn of 1935, the considerable potential of the Fieseler Fi 156 project for the tasks of short-range reconnaissance and aerial observation had prompted the RLM to draw up a requirement for an army cooperation and observation aircraft with its performance parameters. The requirement stipulated the use of the Argus As 10 or the Hirth HM 508 engine and placed emphasis on short field performance, maximum possible allround view for the two crew members, and a wide range of speed. It was intended that the resultant aircraft, which the Siebel Si 201 was also designed to compete for, would be evaluated in competition with the Fi 156.

The Bf 163 closely followed the formula established by the Fi 156 by being a high-wing braced monoplane with a metal structure, automatic leading edge wing slots, double slotted flaps, and an exceptionally tall undercarriage. The aircraft's most interesting feature was the provision for varying the incidence of the entire wing which swivelled on its mainspar, the bracing struts being attached to the fuselage by ball joints and changing their angle with movement of the wing. Construction of the sole prototype was entrusted to Weserflug, though due to its origin with the Bayerische Flugzeugwerke before mid-July 1938, it retained the Bf RLM prefix for the earlier firm.

== Operational history ==
First flown on 19 February 1938 and powered by the Argus As 10C, the Bf 163 V1 proved to have similar performance characteristics to those of the Fi 156 but was more complex and expensive. Although some components for a second prototype were manufactured, the Bf 163 V2 was not completed and further work on the Bf 163 was terminated in favor of the Fieseler Fi 156.

== Specifications (Bf 163 V1) ==
General characteristics

- Crew: two
- Length: 9.75 m (31 ft 11¾ in)
- Wingspan: 13.58 m (44 ft 6⅔ in)
- Height: (N/A)
- Wing area: 22.80 m² (245.41 ft²)
- Empty weight: 995 kg (2,193 lb)
- Loaded weight: 1,310 kg (2,888 lb)
- Powerplant: 1× Argus As 10C 8-cylinder inverted-vee air-cooled engine, 179 kW (240 hp)

Performance

- Maximum speed: 180 km/h (112 mph)

== See also ==
Aircraft of comparable role, configuration, and era

- Fieseler Fi 156 Storch
- Siebel Si 201

Related lists

- List of military aircraft of Germany

== Sources ==
- Green, William Warplanes of the Third Reich. Galahad Books, 1986. ISBN 0-385-05782-2.
