= Focke-Wulf Fw 56 Stösser =

1933 military training aircraft family

Fw 56
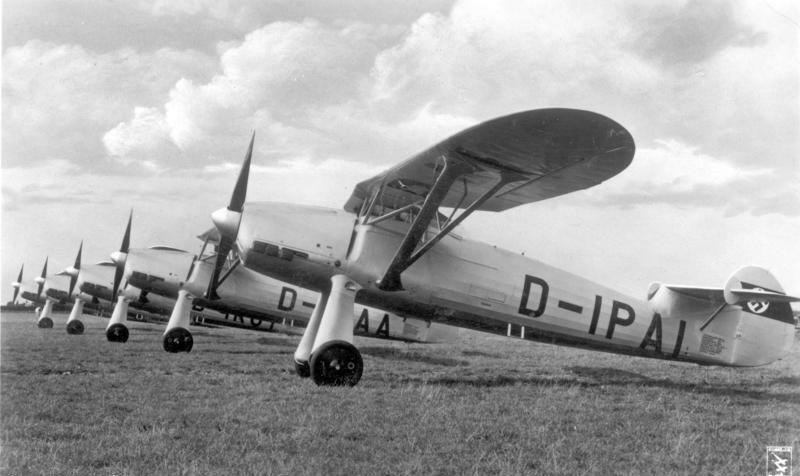
- Focke-Wulf Fw 56

General information
- Type: Advanced Trainer
- Manufacturer: Focke-Wulf
- Primary user: Luftwaffe
- Number built: ~1,000

History
- First flight: November 1933
- Developed into: Focke-Wulf Fw 159

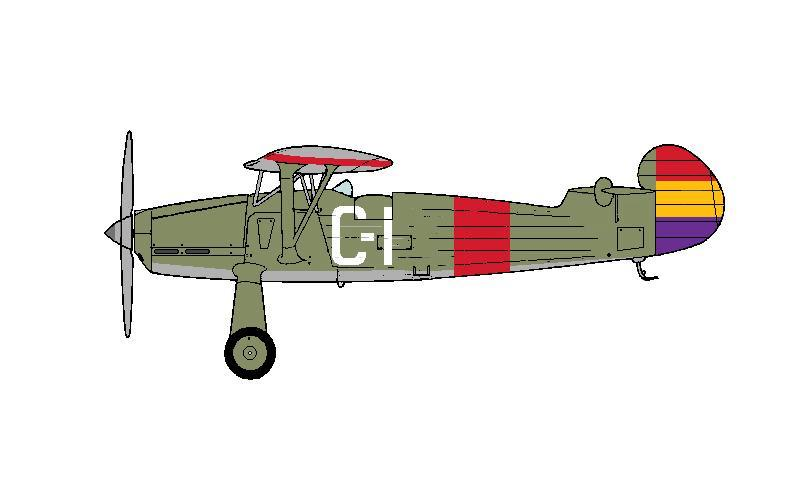
Focke-Wulf Fw 56 of the Spanish Republican Air Force training facility at El Carmolí in 1937

The Focke-Wulf Fw 56 Stösser (lit. 'goshawk') was a single-engine parasol wing monoplane advanced trainer designed and built by the German aircraft manufacturer Focke-Wulf. It was the company's first aircraft to be designed from the onset by the aeronautical engineer Kurt Tank, who also named the type.

The Fw 56 was a parasol-wing monoplane aircraft with a fuselage of steel tube construction, which was clad in metal towards the front and canvas elsewhere. The wing was made of wood and covered mostly in plywood, while the trailing edge was fabric-covered. The fixed conventional undercarriage consisted of two cantilever main legs and a tailskid. The aircraft was powered by an air-cooled Argus As 10C V-8 inline engine and intended as a single-seat advanced trainer for the fledgling pilot trainee to transition to from the Bucher primary trainer. For its secondary role as an emergency fighter as well as aiding aspiring fighter pilot trainees in conversion, it was fitted with a pair of fixed cowl-mounted 7.9mm MG17 machine guns as well as a removable ventral rack for up to three 10kg bombs (inert practice bombs or, in the event, light antipersonnel fragmentation bombs).

Developed to meet a request by the Reichsluftfahrtministerium (RLM), the first prototype performed its maiden flight during November 1933. Two years later, several Fw 56 participated in a competitive flyoff, during which they proved to be superior to both the Arado Ar 76 and the Heinkel He 74 and accordingly secured a production contract from the RLM. The type would be procured in quantity by the Luftwaffe, various flying clubs, and even private individuals across Germany; a number were also sold on the export market to various European and South American nations. In Germany, the Fw 56 was used to demonstrate and evaluate the dive-bombing technique, which was more effective than conventional bombing at that time and contributed to the procurement of dedicated dive-bombers such as the Junkers Ju 87 Stuka.

== Design and development ==
The Fw 56 was developed during the early 1930s in response to a request by the Reichsluftfahrtministerium (RLM) which sought an advanced fighter trainer. It was also considered for possible use as a home defence fighter. The design effort was headed by the firm's chief designer, Kurt Tank, who gave the aircraft the name Stösser (goshawk) in line with Henrich Focke's established convention of naming the company's aircraft after various birds.

The aircraft had a high-mounted parasol wing that had elliptical tips and a slight sweepback. The wing structure comprised a pair of spars, composed of spruce and plywood; spruce was also used for the ribs while plywood was used for some of the wing's covering, the remainder being fabric. An alternative metal wing was also designed. The structure of the fuselage made extensive use of steel tubing, the forward section being covered with metal panels which the rear half was fabric based. The tail unit, which featured a triangular tailplane that was mounted on top of the truncated fin forward of the rudder, was constructed from a combination of wood, metal, and fabric.

To reduce the risk of a fire within the engine bay, a fire-proof bulkhead was present between the bay and the rest of the fuselage interior. Both the fuel tank and oil tank were located behind this bulkhead. The undercarriage comprised cantilever main legs that were covered by wide-chord light metal fairings; the wheels were furnished with Hydraulically-actuated wheels. Some Fw 56s were completed with unspatted wheels.

During November 1933, the first prototype performed its maiden flight. A further two prototypes were built; the second prototype featured several modifications to the fuselage along with metal (rather than wooden) wings. The third prototype, which first flew in February 1934, reverted to the wooden wing and satisfied the technical designers. During 1934, three Fw 56A-0 pre-production aircraft were constructed, the first two featuring twin machine guns and bomb racks, while the third was only equipped with a single machine gun. In the following year, these aircraft were competitively flown against two rival designs - the Arado Ar 76 and the Heinkel He 74 - for a production contract from the RLM. Roughly 1,000 aircraft were built, the majority of which were flown by Germany, where it was flown by numerous civil flying clubs amongst other bodies.

== Operational history ==
Upon the Fw 56 proving its superiority in the competition, the RLM ordered the type into quantity production on behalf of the Luftwaffe. Other major state operators included both Austria and Hungary. A number of Fw 56s were purchased by private owner-operators, such as the German pilot Gerd Achgelis, who later founded the helicopter company Focke-Achgelis together with Henrich Focke. The Fw 56 was a highly popular aircraft amongst pilots, who often praised its aerobatic capabilities and fine handling. Some criticism was received for its undercarriage, which some pilots considered to be relatively fragile.

The Fw 56 had exceptionally clean lines, which positively impacted its flight performance, particularly its relatively high diving speed. Furthermore, its solid construction meant that it could withstand the forces involved in such dives and the consequential pull-out. It was for these qualities that the German pilot Ernst Udet took an interest in the type, arranging for an Fw 56 to be modified with makeshift bomb racks so that it could be used to evaluate the dive-bombing technique, which proved to be more effective than conventional bombing at that time. Specifically, against small targets, a single-engine dive bomber could achieve four times the accuracy at one tenth of the cost of a four-engine heavy bomber, such as the projected Ural bomber. The interest culminated in aircraft such as the Junkers Ju 87 Stuka.

== Variants ==
- Fw 56a : First prototype.
- Fw 56 V2 : Second prototype.
- Fw 56 V3 : Third prototype.
- Fw 56A-0 : Three preproduction aircraft.
- Fw 56A-1 : Single-seat advanced trainer. Main production version.

== Operators ==
Austria

- Austrian Air Force (1927-1938)

Bolivia

- Bolivian Air Force (1936 ex D-IBAE)

Bulgaria

- Bulgarian Air Force

Germany

- Luftwaffe
- NSFK

Hungary

- Royal Hungarian Air Force

Netherlands

- Royal Netherlands Air Force

Romania

- Royal Romanian Air Force

Spanish Republic

- Spanish Republican Air Force, one of the few German-made planes in the loyalist air force.

Spain

- Spanish Air Force

== Specifications (Fw 56A-1) ==
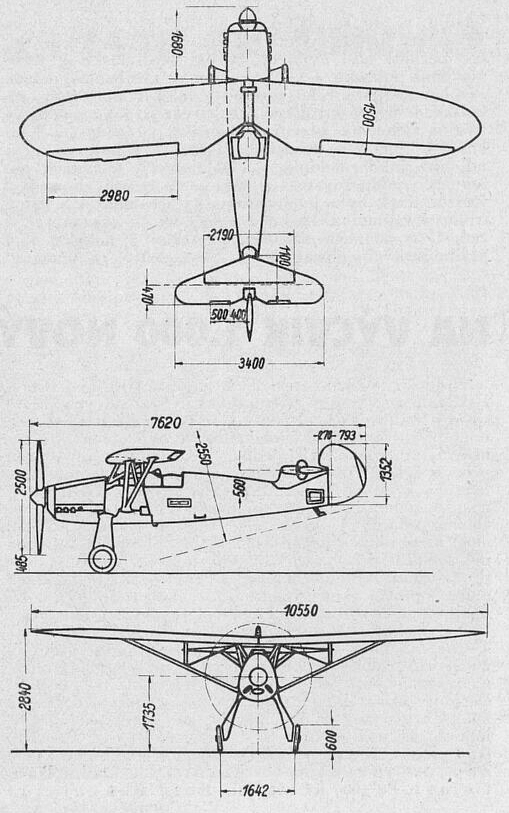
Focke-Wulf Fw 56

Data from Die Deutsche Luftrüstung 1933-1945

General characteristics

- Crew: one
- Length: 7.6 m (24 ft 11 in)
- Wingspan: 10.5 m (34 ft 5 in)
- Height: 2.6 m (8 ft 6 in)
- Wing area: 14 m^{2} (150 sq ft)
- Empty weight: 755 kg (1,664 lb)
- Gross weight: 985 kg (2,172 lb)
- Powerplant: 1 × Argus As 10C inverted V-8 air-cooled piston engine, 176.5 kW (236.7 hp) (converted from PS)

Performance

- Maximum speed: 278 km/h (173 mph, 150 kn) at sea level
- Cruise speed: 255 km/h (158 mph, 138 kn)
- Landing speed: 90 km/h (56 mph)
- Range: 385 km (239 mi, 208 nmi)
- Service ceiling: 6,200 m (20,300 ft)
- Rate of climb: 8.42 m/s (1,657 ft/min)
- Time to altitude: 1,000 m (3,300 ft) in two minutes and twelve seconds

Armament

- Guns: 2 × 7.92 mm (.312 in) MG 17 machine guns
- Bombs: 3 x 10kg bombs on external ventral rack

== See also ==
Related development

- Focke-Wulf Fw 159

Aircraft of comparable role, configuration, and era

- Arado Ar 76
- Heinkel He 74

Related lists

- List of military aircraft of Germany
- List of aircraft of the Spanish Republican Air Force
