= Henschel Hs 125 =

German prototype aircraft

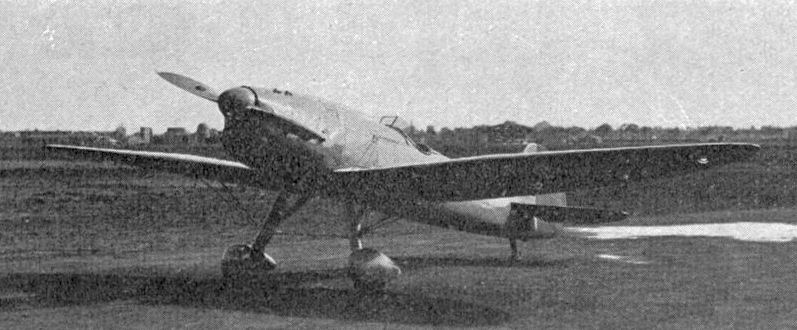

General information
- Type: Trainer
- Designer: Henschel & Son
- Primary user: Luftwaffe
- Number built: 2

History
- First flight: 1934

The Henschel Hs 125 was a German advanced training aircraft prototype featuring a single engine and low wing, designed by Henschel & Son and tested by the Luftwaffe in 1934. Only two prototypes were ever built.

== Specifications ==
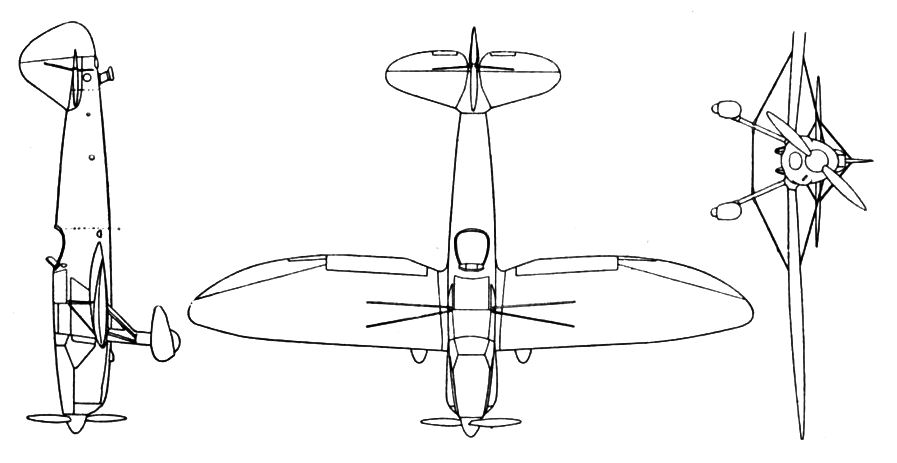
Henschel Hs 125 3-view drawing from L'Aerophile September 1939

Data from The Warplanes of the Third Reich

General characteristics

- Crew: 1
- Length: 7.307 m (23 ft 11 2/3 in)
- Wingspan: 10.001 m (32 ft 9 3/4 in)
- Height: 2.299 m (7 ft 6 1/2 in)
- Wing area: 14.00 m^{2} (150.7 sq ft)
- Empty weight: 694 kg (1,529 lb)
- Gross weight: 973 kg (2,145 lb)
- Powerplant: 1 × Argus As 10C air-cooled inverted V8 engine, 180 kW (240 hp)

Performance

- Maximum speed: 280 km/h (174 mph, 151 kn) at sea level
- Cruise speed: 249 km/h (155 mph, 135 kn)
- Range: 500 km (310 mi, 270 nmi)
- Service ceiling: 7,000 m (22,900 ft)
- Rate of climb: 8.4 m/s (1,650 ft/min)

Armament

- Guns: 1 × 7.9mm MG 17 machine gun
