= Gotha Go 145 =

German world war-ll era biplane

Go 145

General information
- Type: Trainer
- Manufacturer: Gotha
- Designer: Albert Kalkert
- Primary user: Luftwaffe
- Number built: 1,182 (German production)

History
- Introduction date: 1935
- First flight: February, 1934
- Retired: 1945 (Note: The Spanish CASA 1145-L licensed version saw post-World War II service as a trainer)

The Gotha Go 145 is a German World War II-era biplane of wood and fabric construction used by Luftwaffe training units. Although obsolete by the start of World War II, the Go 145 remained in operational service until the end of the War in Europe as a night harassment bomber.

== Development ==
On 2 October 1933 the Gotha aircraft company was re-established. The first aircraft manufactured was the Gotha Go 145, a two-seat biplane designed by Dipl-Ing Albert Kalkert made out of wood with a fabric covering. The Go 145 featured fixed landing gear and was powered by an Argus As 10C inverted V8 air-cooled engine fitted with a two-blade fixed-pitch propeller. The first prototype took to the air in February 1934, and was followed by a production model, the Gotha Go 145A, with controls in both cockpits for trainee and instructor.

== Operational history ==
In 1935, the Go 145 started service with Luftwaffe training units. The aircraft proved a successful design and production of the Go 145 was taken up by other companies, including AGO, Focke-Wulf and BFW. Licensed versions were also manufactured in Spain and Turkey. The Spanish version, called the CASA 1145-L actually remained in service until long after World War II.

Ignoring prototypes, 1,182 Go 145s were built in Germany for Luftwaffe service. An unknown number of license-produced Go 145s were also built. Further development of the aircraft was done. The Gotha Go 145B was fitted with an enclosed cockpit and wheel spats (an aerodynamic wheel housing on fixed-gear). The Go 145C was developed for gunnery training and was fitted with a single 7.92 mm (.312 in) MG 15 machine gun in the rear cockpit, requiring removal of that cockpit's flight controls. The Go 145D was fitted with a 240 hp (180 kW) Argus As 410 engine.

By 1942, the Soviet Union began using obsolete aircraft such as the Polikarpov Po-2 to conduct night harassment missions against the Germans. Noting the success of the raids, the Germans began conducting their own night harassment missions with obsolete aircraft on the Eastern Front. In December 1942, the first Störkampfstaffel ("harassment squadron") was established and equipped with Gotha Go 145 and Arado Ar 66 training biplanes. The night harassment units were successful and by October 1943 there were six night harassment squadrons equipped with Gotha Go 145s.

Also in October 1943, the Störkampfstaffeln were brought together into larger Nachtschlachtgruppe (NSGr, night ground attack groups, literally "night battle group") units of either three or four squadrons each. In March 1945 Nachtschlachtgruppe 5 had 69 Gotha Go 145's on strength of which 52 were serviceable while Nachtschlachtgruppe 3 in the Courland Pocket had 18 Gotha Go 145's on strength of which 16 were serviceable. When the war in Europe ended on 8–9 May 1945 the Gotha Go 145 equipped the majority of the Nachtschlachtgruppen.

== Operators ==
- Austria: Austrian Air Force – 12 aircraft delivered in 1937
- Czechoslovakia: Czechoslovak Air Force (postwar)
- Germany: Luftwaffe
- Romania: Royal Romanian Air Force
- Slovakia: Slovak Air Force (1939–1945) 30 supplied
- Spain: Spanish Air Force
- Turkey: Turkish Air Force – First three samples were brought over from Germany, and then 43 of them were produced under license at KTF (Kayseri Aeroplane Factory) between 1936 and 1939. They had replaced Caudron C.59s. They were in service until 1947. Turkish models were armed with two 7.92mm machine guns. Starting in 1943 they were all replaced by Miles Magisters.

== Surviving aircraft ==
- Gotha Go 145A – Museum für Verkehr und Technik. Berlin, Germany.
- Gotha Go 145A – Norsk Luftfartssenter. Bodø, Norway.

Both examples are badly damaged and are in storage.

== Specifications (Go 145A) ==
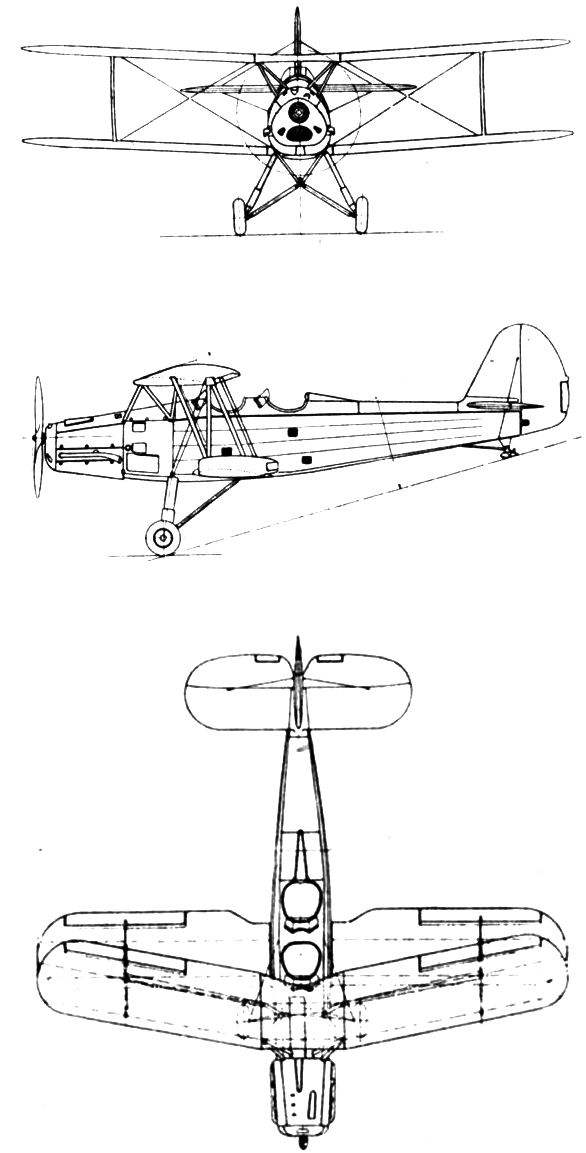
Gotha Go.145 3-view drawing from L'Aerophile August 1937

Data from German aircraft of the Second World War

General characteristics

- Crew: 2
- Length: 8.7 m (28 ft 7 in)
- Wingspan: 9 m (29 ft 6 in)
- Height: 2.9 m (9 ft 6 in)
- Wing area: 21.75 m^{2} (234.1 sq ft)
- Empty weight: 800 kg (1,764 lb)
- Gross weight: 1,380 kg (3,042 lb)
- Powerplant: 1 × Argus As 10 V-8 inverted air-cooled piston engine, 179 kW (240 hp)
- Propellers: 2-bladed fixed-pitch propeller

Performance

- Maximum speed: 212 km/h (132 mph, 114 kn) at sea level
- Cruise speed: 180 km/h (110 mph, 97 kn)
- Landing speed: 90 km/h (56 mph; 49 kn)
- Range: 630 km (390 mi, 340 nmi)
- Service ceiling: 3,700 m (12,100 ft)
- Time to altitude: 1,000 m (3,300 ft) in 5 minutes 30 seconds

== See also ==
Aircraft of comparable role, configuration, and era

- Bücker Bü 131 Jungmann
- de Havilland Tiger Moth
- Levente II
- Polikarpov Po-2

== Bibliography ==
- Bishop, C. Luftwaffe Squadrons, 1939–1945. Amber Books, 2006.
- Donald, D. (ed.) Warplanes of the Luftwaffe: Combat aircraft of Hitler’s Luftwaffe, 1933–1945. Aerospace Publishing, 2001.
- Gerdessen, Frederik. "Estonian Air Power 1918 – 1945". Air Enthusiast, No. 18, April – July 1982. pp. 61–76. ISSN 0143-5450.
- Green, William. Warplanes of the Third Reich. London: Macdonald and Jane's Publishers Ltd., 1970 (fourth impression 1979). ISBN 0-356-02382-6.
- Metzmacher, Andreas (2021). Gotha Aircraft 1913-1954: From the London Bomber to the Flying Wing Jet Fighter. Brimscombe, Stroud: Fonthill. ISBN 978-1-78155-706-8.
- Munson, Kenneth (1978). German Aircraft Of World War 2 in colour. Poole, Dorsett, UK: Blandford Press. ISBN 0-7137-0860-3.
- Nowarra, Heinz J. Die Deutsche Luftrüstung 1933–1945 (in German). Koblenz, Germany: Bernard & Graeffe Verlag, 1993. ISBN 3-7637-5464-4.
- Wood, Tony and Gunston, Bill. Hitler's Luftwaffe: A pictorial history and technical encyclopedia of Hitler's air power in World War II. London: Salamander Books Ltd., 1977. ISBN 0-86101-005-1.
