= Focke-Wulf Fw 159 =

1935 experimental German fighter aircraft

Focke Wulf Fw 159
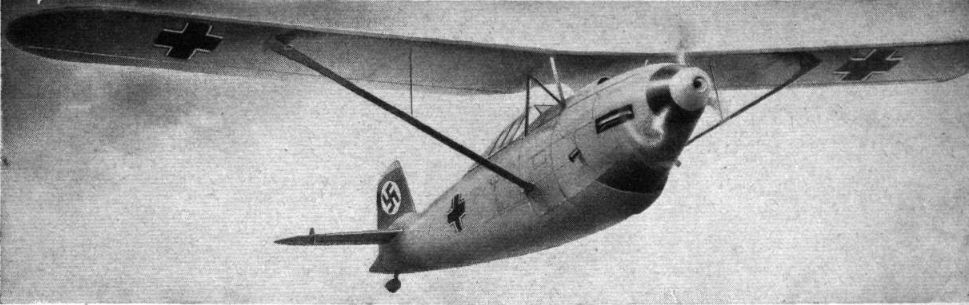

General information
- Type: Fighter
- National origin: German
- Manufacturer: Focke-Wulf
- Designer: Kurt Tank
- Number built: 3

History
- First flight: 1935
- Developed from: Focke-Wulf Fw 56

The Focke Wulf Fw 159 was an experimental German fighter of the 1930s, designed by Kurt Tank which never reached production, as it was considered inferior to the He 112 and Bf 109. It was a heavier variant of the Focke-Wulf Fw 56, with several improvements, such as a retractable landing gear and enclosed cockpit.

== Design and development ==
The Focke-Wulf company designed the aircraft as one of the four entries for the Rüstungsflugzeug IV ("Armed Aircraft IV") 1934 fighter competition. Its parasol wing configuration was based on the company's successful trainer product, the Focke-Wulf Fw 56 Stösser, and it used a Junkers Jumo 210 engine. The plane had an enclosed cockpit and a rearward-retracting lever-action suspension main undercarriage which retracted completely into the lower fuselage. This mechanism was complicated, fragile and endlessly troublesome. The first prototype, the Fw-159 V1, was ready in the spring of 1935 but was destroyed when it crash-landed following the failure of the main undercarriage to deploy properly.

The second prototype, the V2, had a reinforced undercarriage. The general flight characteristics were good but the rate of climb and rate of turn were unsatisfactory, and the aircraft suffered greater drag than its competitors in the contest, the Arado Ar 80, Heinkel He 112 and Messerschmitt Bf 109. The competition was won by the Bf 109.

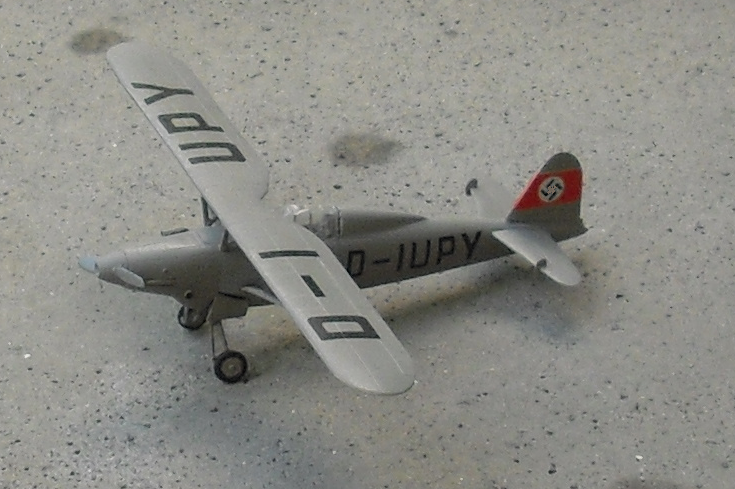
Scale model Fw 159

== Specifications (V2) ==
Data from Hitler's Luftwaffe

General characteristics

- Crew: 1
- Length: 9.77 m (32 ft 1 in)
- Wingspan: 12.4 m (40 ft 8 in)
- Height: 3.75 m (12 ft 4 in)
- Empty weight: 1,875 kg (4,134 lb)
- Gross weight: 2,250 kg (4,960 lb)
- Powerplant: 1 × Junkers Jumo 210Da V-12 inverted liquid-cooled piston engine, 507 kW (680 hp)
- Propellers: 3-bladed variable-pitch propeller

Performance

- Maximum speed: 385 km/h (239 mph, 208 kn)
- Range: 650 km (400 mi, 350 nmi)

== See also ==
- Swedish FFVS J22, which used a similar main landing gear design to the Fw 159

Related development

- Focke-Wulf Fw 56

Related lists

- List of military aircraft of Germany
