= Siebel Si 201 =

1938 German air observation post aircraft

Si 201
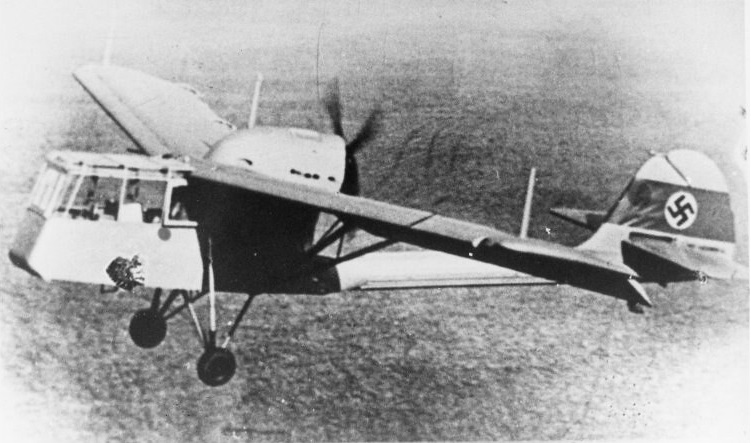

General information
- Type: Air observation post
- National origin: Germany
- Manufacturer: Siebel Flugzeugwerke Halle K.G.
- Number built: 2

History
- First flight: 1938

The Siebel Si 201 was a German air observation post and army cooperation aircraft, designed and built by Siebel. Evaluated against other types, the Si 201 did not enter production and only two prototypes were built.

== Design and development ==
Designed to meet a requirement for an air observation post and army cooperation aircraft, the Si 201 first flew in 1938. It was evaluated against the Fieseler Fi 156 and Messerschmitt Bf 163. The Fi 156 was ordered into production and only the two prototype 201s were built.

The Si 201 was a high-wing, braced monoplane with a tailwheel landing gear, powered by an Argus As 10C, mounted above the wing and driving a pusher propeller. It had a boxy, fully glazed forward fuselage with room for a pilot and observer in tandem.

== Specifications ==
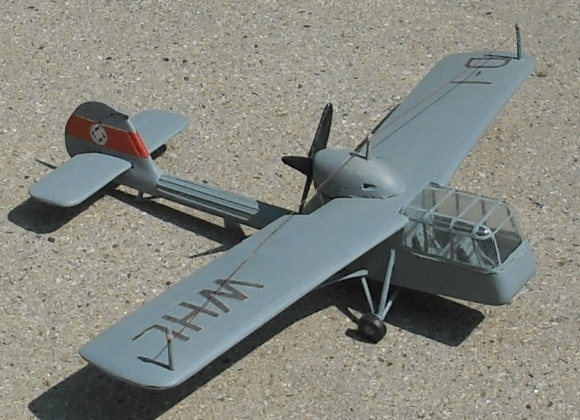
Model of the Si 201

Data from Warplanes of the Third Reich

General characteristics

- Crew: two
- Length: 10.40 m (34 ft 1 1/2 in)
- Wingspan: 14.00 m (45 ft 11 1/4 in)
- Height: 3.40 m (11 ft 1 3/4 in)
- Wing area: 31.00 m^{2} (333.7 sq ft)
- Empty weight: 1,120 kg (2,469 lb)
- Gross weight: 1,440 kg (3,175 lb)
- Powerplant: 1 × Argus As 10C air-cooled inverted V8 engine, 180 kW (240 hp)

Performance

- Maximum speed: 185 km/h (115 mph, 100 kn) at sea level
- Cruise speed: 150 km/h (93 mph, 81 kn)
- Range: 450 km (280 mi, 240 nmi)
- Service ceiling: 5,500 m (18,050 ft)
- Rate of climb: 4.20 m/s (827 ft/min)
- Time to altitude: 4.5 min to 1,000 m (3,300 ft)

== See also ==
Aircraft of comparable role, configuration, and era

- Fieseler Fi 156 Storch
- Messerschmitt Bf 163

Related lists

- List of military aircraft of Germany
