= Argus As 10 =

1920s German piston aircraft engine

As 10
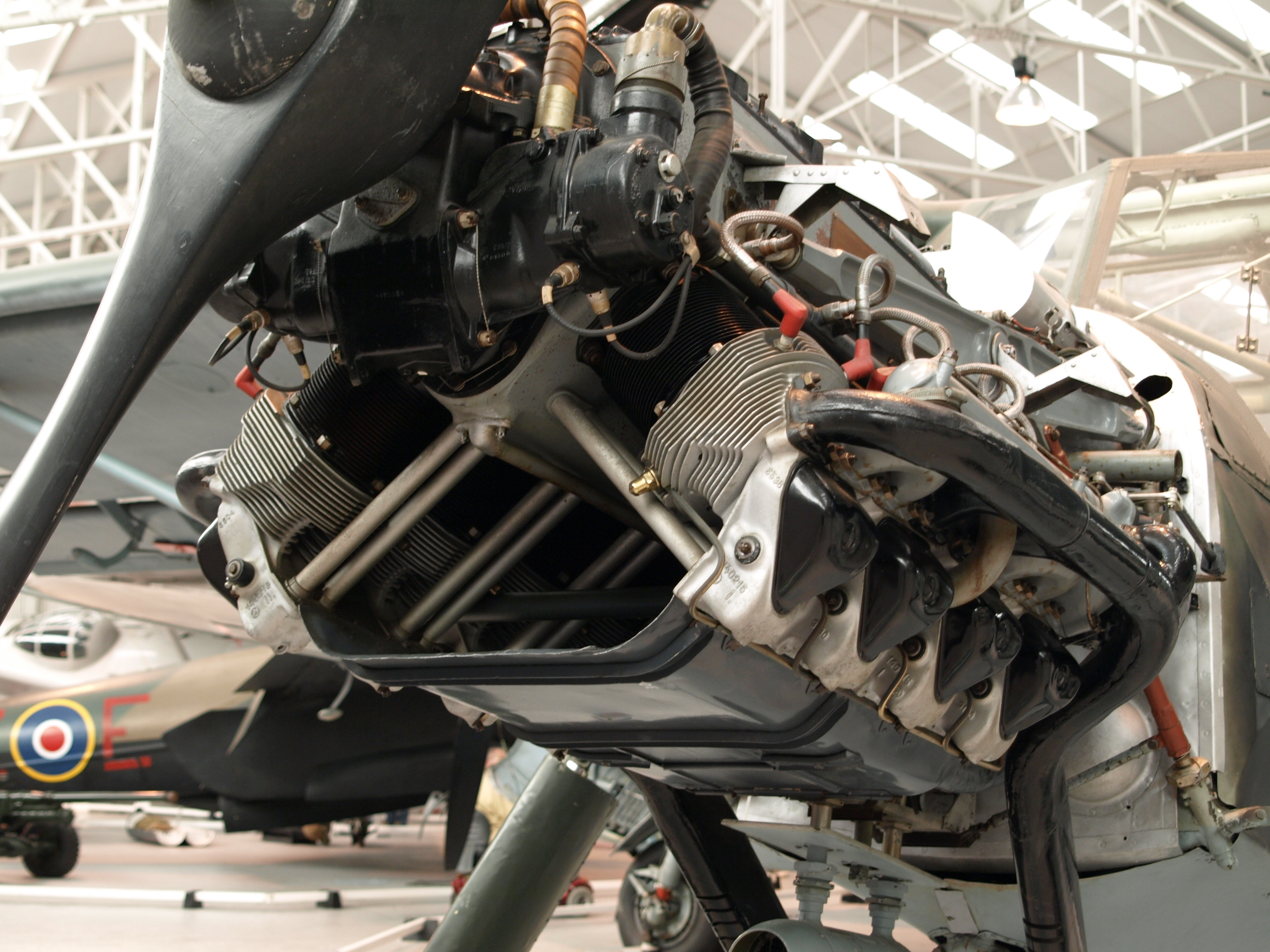
- Argus As 10 installed in a Fieseler Storch at the Royal Air Force Museum Cosford
- Type: Piston aircraft engine
- Manufacturer: Argus Motoren
- First run: 1928
- Major applications: Fieseler Fi 156 Storch; Focke-Wulf Fw 56 Stösser; Messerschmitt Bf 108 Taifun
- Number built: 28,700

The Argus As 10 was a German-designed and built, air-cooled 90° cylinder bank-angle inverted V8 "low power" aircraft engine, used mainly in training aircraft such as the Arado Ar 66 and Focke-Wulf Fw 56 Stösser and other small short-range reconnaissance and communications aircraft like the Fieseler Fi 156 Storch during, and shortly after, World War II. It was first built in 1928.

== Variants ==
As 10C
As 10C-1
As 10E
Optional-output version of the As 10C, delivered with either a 240 PS (177 kW) or 270 PS (199 kW) rating (achieved by increasing maximum rpm).
As 10E-2
The proposed powerplant of the Pilatus P-1 trainer project.
As 401
Supercharged As 10 with rated output at 3,000 m (9,843 ft), also fitted with hydraulically actuated variable pitch propeller.
Salmson 8As-00
Postwar production of the Argus As 10 in France
Salmson 8As-04
Postwar production of the Argus As 10 in France

== Applications ==
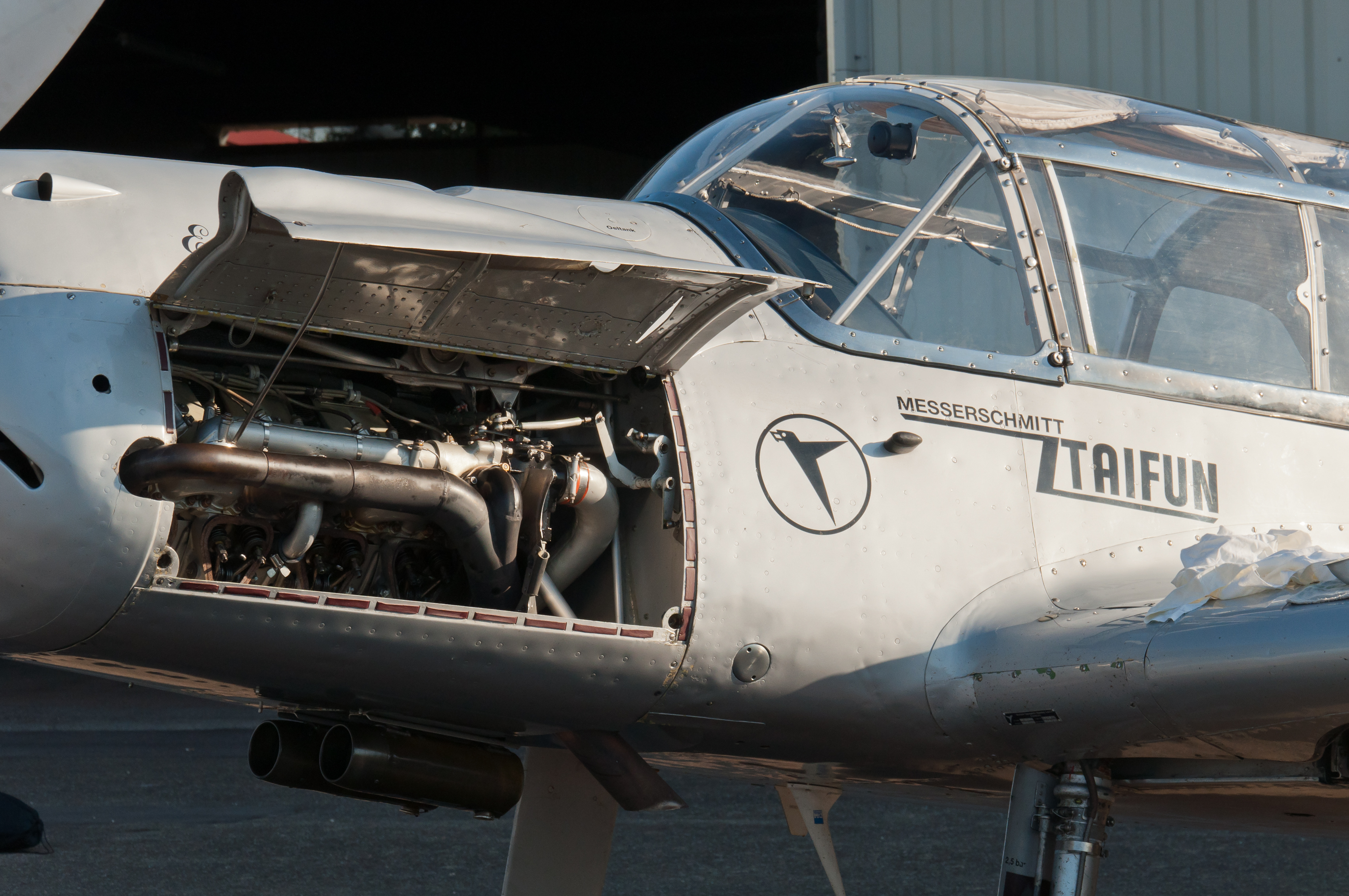
Argus As 10c engine in a Messerschmitt Bf 108 Taifun

- AGO Ao 192
- Arado Ar 66
- Arado Ar 76
- Dornier Do 12
- Farman F.510 Monitor II
- Fieseler Fi 156 Storch
- Focke-Wulf Fw 56 Stösser
- Focke-Wulf Fw 58
- Gotha Go 145
- Henschel Hs 121
- Kayaba Ka-1 Imperial Japanese Army Observation autogiro
- Klemm Kl 151
- Messerschmitt Bf 108 Taifun
- Rogozarski SIM-XIV-H
- Siebel Si 201

== Specifications (Argus As 10 C) ==
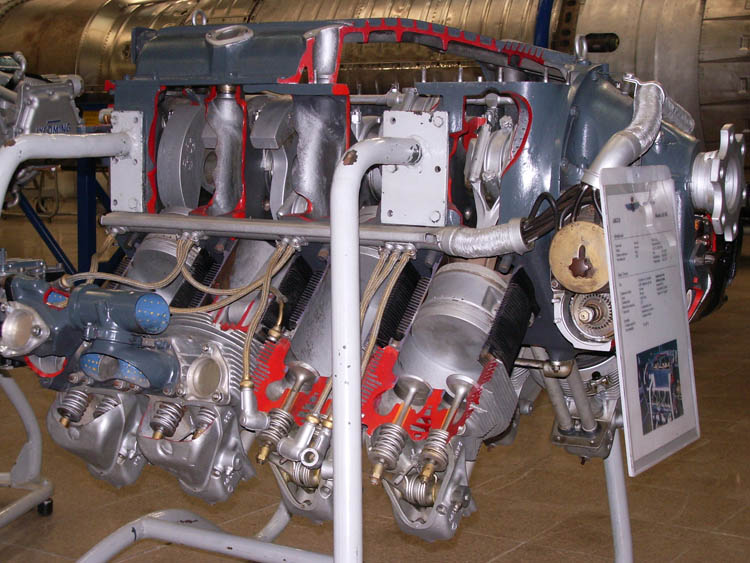
Argus As 10 C, partially sectioned, showing some inner parts

Data from Jane's All the World's Aircraft 1938, Flugzeug-Typenbuch. Handbuch der deutschen Luftfahrt- und Zubehör-Industrie 1944

=== General characteristics ===
- Type: inverted V-8 air-cooled inverted 90° piston engine
- Bore: 120 mm (4.724 in)
- Stroke: 140 mm (5.512 in)
- Displacement: 12.667 L (772.99 cu in)
- Length: 1,105 mm (43.50 in)
- Width: 880 mm (34.65 in)
- Height: 718 mm (28.27 in)
- Dry weight: 213 kg (470 lb) dry

232 kg (511 lb) wet, equipped

=== Components ===
- Valvetrain: Two under-head valves per cylinder, operated by pushrods and rockers.
- Fuel system: Two Sun carburetors adapted for aerobatics
- Fuel type: 80 octane
- Oil system: Dry sump, one pressure pump at 1.25–6 atm (1.27–6.08 bar; 18.4–88.2 psi) and two scavenge pumps
- Cooling system: Air

=== Performance ===
- Power output:

- 240 PS (237 hp; 177 kW) at 2,000 rpm (5 minutes) at sea level
- 220 PS (217 hp; 162 kW) at 1,940 rpm (30 minutes) at sea level
- 200 PS (197 hp; 147 kW) at 1,890 rpm (max continuous) at sea level

- Specific power: 18.95 PS/L (0.3063 hp/cu in; 13.94 kW/L)
- Compression ratio: 5.9:1
- Specific fuel consumption: 0.23 kg/PSh (0.51 lb/(hp⋅h); 0.31 kg/kWh) at max continuous
- Oil consumption: 0.008 kg/PSh (0.018 lb/(hp⋅h); 0.011 kg/kWh) at max continuous
- Power-to-weight ratio: 1.124 PS/kg (0.503 hp/lb; 0.827 kW/kg)0.835 kW/kg (0.51 hp/lb)

B.M.E.P.: 7.5 atm (760 kPa; 110 psi)

== See also ==
Related lists

- List of aircraft engines
