= MG 17 machine gun =

WWII-era German aircraft machine gun

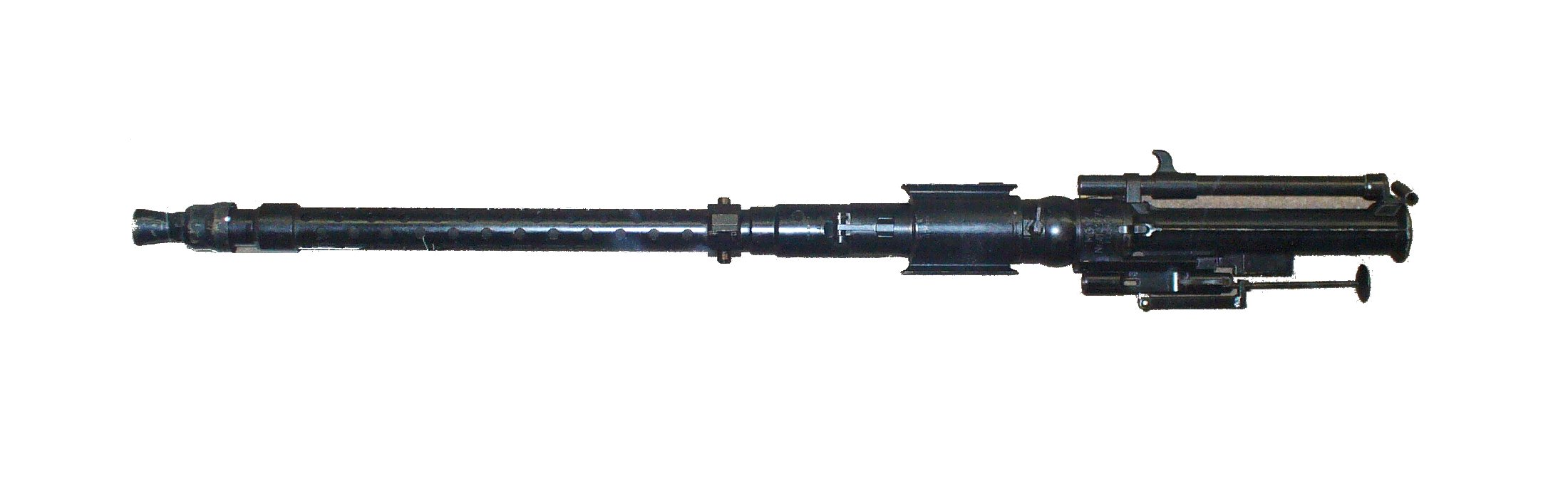
- .
- Type: Aircraft machine-gun
- Place of origin: Nazi Germany

Service history
- Used by: Nazi Germany
- Wars: World War II

Production history
- Designed: 1934
- Manufacturer: Rheinmetall-Borsig
- Produced: 1934–1944
- No. built: At least 24,271 (including those modified for infantry use)
- Variants: Modular design

Specifications
- Mass: 10.2 kg (22 lb)
- Length: 1,175 mm (46.3 in)
- Barrel length: 600 mm (24 in)
- Cartridge: 7.92×57mm Mauser
- Caliber: 7,9 (7,92+0,04)
- Action: Recoil operated, firing from closed bolt
- Rate of fire: 1,200 rpm
- Muzzle velocity: from 885 m/s (2,900 ft/s) (Phosphor "B" round ) to 905 m/s (2,970 ft/s) (Armor Piercing Tracer "SmK L'spur" round)
- Feed system: 500-round belt
- Sights: Various types

The MG 17 was a 7.92 mm machine gun produced by Rheinmetall-Borsig for use at fixed mountings in many World War II Luftwaffe aircraft, typically as forward-firing offensive armament. The MG 17 was based on the older MG 30 light machine gun, as was its defensive flexible-mount counterpart, the MG 15 machine gun.

== History ==
A mainstay fixed machine gun in German-built aircraft (many of which were sold to other countries) well before World War II, by 1940 it was starting to be replaced with heavier-caliber machine gun and cannons. By 1945 very few if any aircraft mounted the MG 17.

The MG 17 was installed in the Messerschmitt Bf 109, Messerschmitt Bf 110, Focke-Wulf Fw 190, Junkers Ju 87, Junkers Ju 88C Nightfighter, Heinkel He 111, Dornier Do 17/215 Nightfighter, Focke-Wulf Fw 189 and many other aircraft. Many MG 17s were later modified for infantry use, as the Luftwaffe replaced them with the heavier-calibre MG 131, which replaced both the MG 15 in bomber defense applications and the MG 17 as the standard fighter's forward-firing offensive armament (unless the machine guns were replaced by autocannons, such as the MG 151/20, altogether). Official numbers of conversions was about 24,271 by January 1, 1944, although additional conversions may have been done as well.

Modifications to the design included removal of the buttstock, switching from magazine to belt-fed ammunition, and from open-bolt operation to closed bolt operation, to allow it to be installed in synchronized applications, firing through the propeller arc. The MG 15 retained open bolt operation, but used 75 round saddle-type drum magazines, and likewise lost its buttstock, to fit better in the tight confines of an aircraft. The MG 30 was also the basis for the famed MG 34 and MG 42 designs; variants of the latter are still in service in certain areas.

== Specifications ==
- Calibre: 7.9 +/- .04 mm
- Cartridge: 7.92×57mm IS
- Round weight: 35.5 grams (cartridge 24 grams, bullet 11.5 grams)
- Muzzle velocity: from 885 m/s (Phosphor "B" round ) to 905 m/s (Armor Piercing Tracer "SmK L'spur" round)
- Rate of fire: 1200 rpm

Dimensions

- Length: 1175 mm
- Weight: 10.2 kg
- Action: Recoil
- Feed system: Belt magazine
- Sights Remotely located, various types

== See also ==
- Browning M1919
- Vickers VGO
- Lewis gun/Type 92 machine gun
- Type 1/Type 98 machine gun (MG 15)
- Type 89 machine gun
- List of firearms
- List of uncommon World War II weapons
