= Focke-Wulf Fw 57 =

German fighter-bomber prototypes

Fw 57
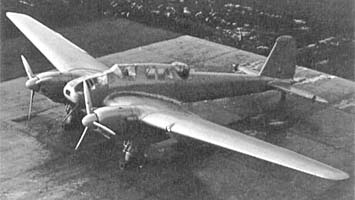

General information
- Type: Heavy fighter
- National origin: Germany
- Manufacturer: Focke-Wulf
- Status: Prototype only
- Number built: 3

History
- First flight: 1936

The Focke-Wulf Fw 57 was a prototype German heavy fighter and fighter-bomber. Prototypes were built in 1936 but never entered production.

== Design and development ==
In 1934, the Reich Air Ministry (RLM) declared a requirement for a Kampfzerstörer (battle destroyer), a tactical multi-role fighter/bomber concept, and a possible predecessor to the late-1930s German Schnellbomber concept. Focke-Wulf submitted the Fw 57, Messerschmitt submitted the Bf 110 and Henschel submitted the Hs 124. The Fw 57 was larger than its two competitors; it was heavier and did not handle as well as them.

The Fw 57 was a twin-engine all-metal monoplane of conventional configuration, with a single fin and rearwards-retracting maingear members comprising its tailwheel undercarriage, into the engine nacelles. The pilot and navigator sat in tandem under a long canopy, the aft end of which had a gunner's turret.

Three Fw 57 prototypes (V1-V3) were completed during 1936. The aircraft was severely overweight and handled poorly. The original Kampfzerstörer concept, which specified a multi-role aircraft with turret-mounted armament had been abandoned by autumn 1936 in favor of the simpler Zerstörer represented by the Bf 110, which omitted gun turrets and bombing capability to allow greater performance. All further research into the Fw 57 was abandoned shortly thereafter.

== Specifications (Fw 57 V1) ==
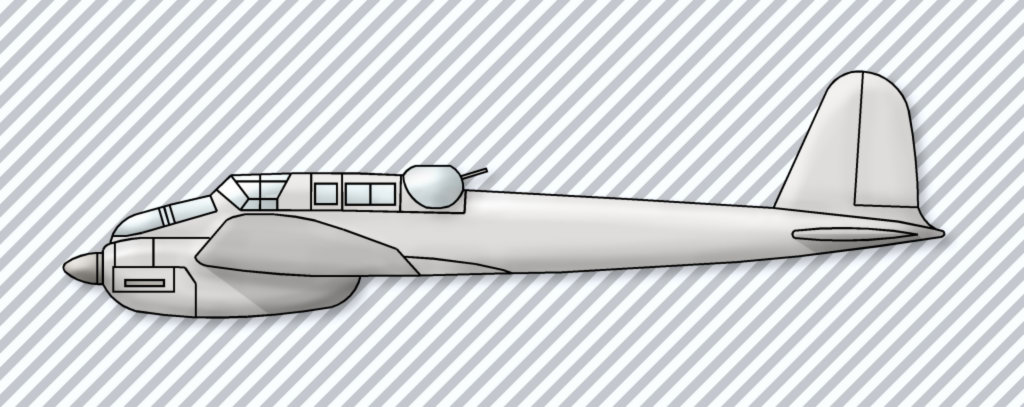

Data from Warplanes of the Third Reich

General characteristics

- Crew: 3 (pilot, navigator and gunner)
- Length: 16.4 m (53 ft 10 in)
- Wingspan: 25 m (82 ft 0 in)
- Height: 4.1 m (13 ft 5 in)
- Wing area: 73.5 m^{2} (791 sq ft)
- Empty weight: 6,814 kg (15,022 lb)
- Gross weight: 8,317 kg (18,336 lb)
- Powerplant: × Daimler-Benz DB 600A V-12 inverted liquid-cooled piston engines, 679 kW (911 hp)
- Propellers: 3-bladed variable-pitch propellers

Performance

- Maximum speed: 404 km/h (251 mph, 218 kn) at 3,000 m (9,800 ft)
- Cruise speed: 374 km/h (232 mph, 202 kn)
- Service ceiling: 9,100 m (29,900 ft)

Armament

- Guns: 3x 20 mm (0.787 in) MG FF cannon (2 in the nose and 1 in a Mauser electric dorsal turret)
- Bombs: 600 kg (1,323 lb) of bombs
