= Messerschmitt Bf 161 =

German reconnaissance aircraft prototype

Bf 161
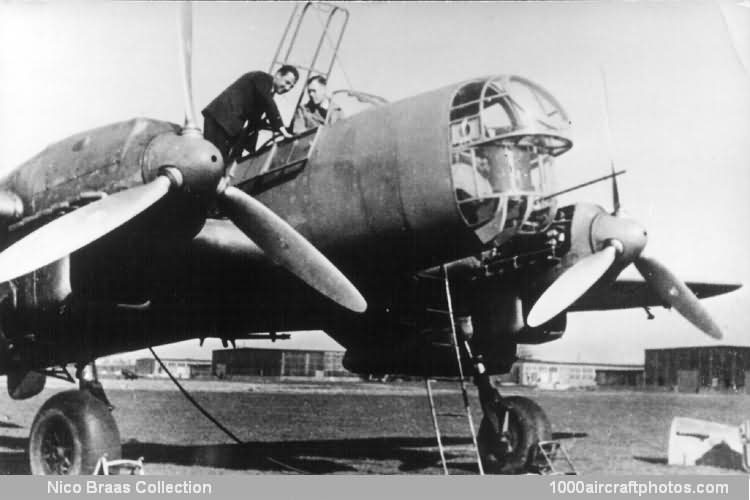

General information
- Type: Reconnaissance monoplane
- National origin: Germany
- Manufacturer: Messerschmitt
- Primary user: Luftwaffe
- Number built: 2

History
- First flight: 1938
- Developed from: Messerschmitt Bf 110

The Messerschmitt Bf 161 was a 1930s prototype German reconnaissance aircraft.

== Development ==
The Bf 161 was a specialised reconnaissance aircraft, based on the Bf 110, and similar to the Bf 162, designed as a light bomber. The prototype V1 was powered by two Junkers Jumo 210 inline engines and first flew on 9 March 1938. It was followed by a second prototype, V2, powered by two Daimler-Benz DB 600a engines which first flew on 30 August 1938.

The aircraft did not enter production, as it was soon decided that a new aircraft type was not needed, and variants of the Bf 110 could perform the reconnaissance role.

== Operational history ==
The two prototypes were used for research and development, and V2 was used in Augsburg for towing the Me 163A Komet, later moving to Peenemünde to continue towing.

== Specifications (Bf 161 V1) ==
General characteristics

- Crew: three
- Length: 12.85 m (42 ft 2 in)
- Wingspan: 16.69 m (54 ft 9 in)
- Height: 3.64 m (11 ft 11 in)
- Wing area: 38.5 m^{2} (414 sq ft)
- Empty weight: 4,890 kg (10,781 lb)
- Powerplant: 2 × Junkers Jumo 210G , 730 kW (979 hp) each

Performance

- Maximum speed: 440 km/h (274 mph, 238 kn)
- Service ceiling: 8,100 m (26,568 ft)

== See also ==
Related development

- Messerschmitt Bf 110
- Messerschmitt Bf 162
