= Daimler-Benz DB 600 series =

1930s German piston aircraft engine range

DB 600 series
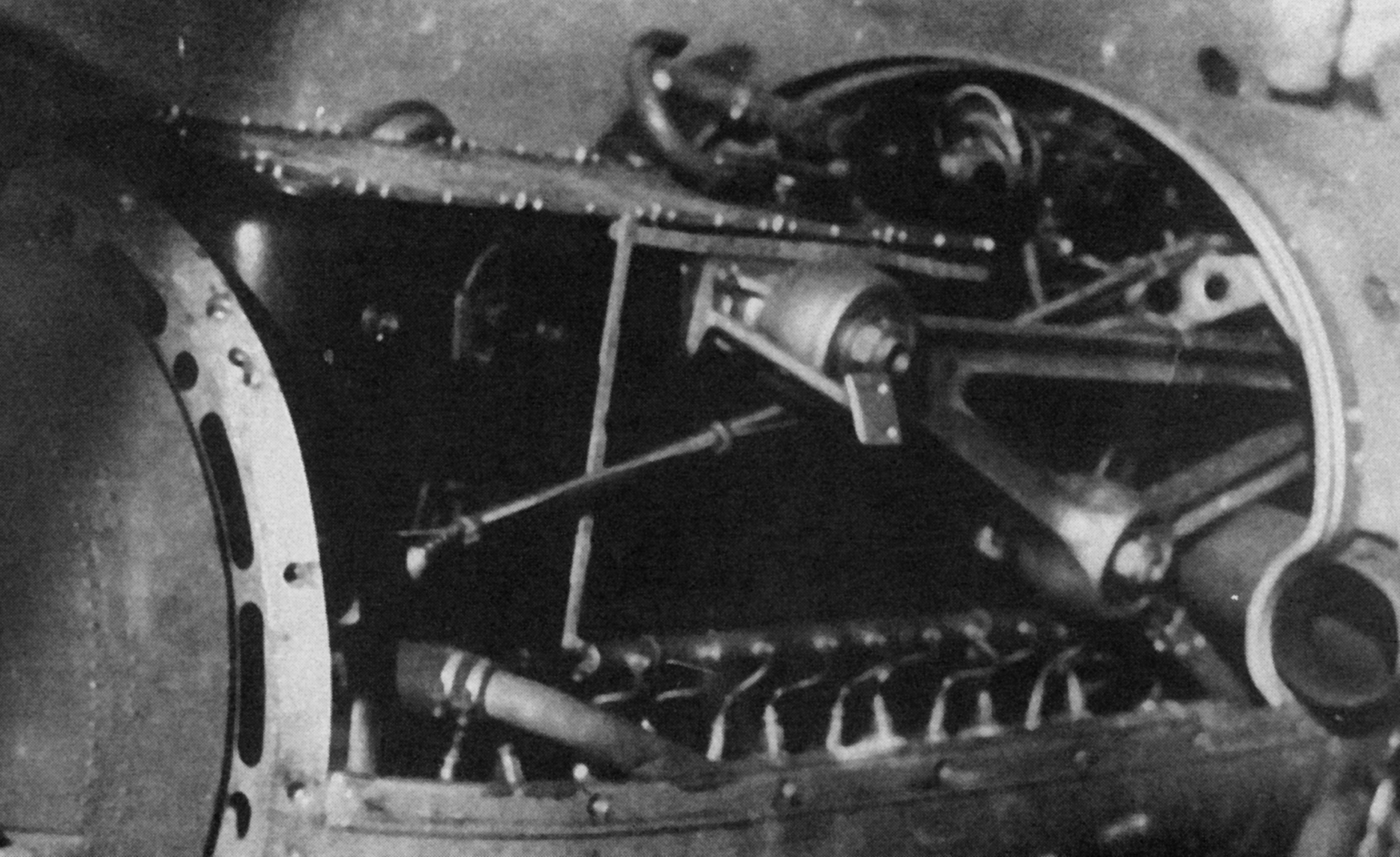
- DB 600A in a Heinkel He 111B nacelle

The Daimler-Benz DB 600 series were a number of German aircraft engines designed and built before and during World War II as part of a new generation of German engine technology. The general layout was that of a liquid-cooled, inverted V12 engine. The design originated to a private venture project of Daimler-Benz, the F4 engine. Most newer DB engine designs used in WW2 were based around this engine.

The decision by the RLM to concentrate on manufacturing aircraft engines using fuel injection systems rather than carburetors meant that the DB 600 was quickly superseded by the otherwise similar DB 601 that included direct fuel injection. Later DB series engines grew in bore, stroke, and horsepower, including the DB 603 and DB 605, but were generally similar to the pattern created with the DB 600.

== Development ==
=== Origins: the F4 ===
Based on the guidelines laid down by the Reichswehrministerium (Imperial Ministry of Defence), in 1929 Daimler-Benz begun development of a new aero engine of the 30-litre class: a liquid-cooled inverted-Vee 12-cylinder piston engine. This became the F4, and by 1931 two prototypes were running on the test bench. These were followed by the improved F4 B, which became the prototype for the DB 600.

=== Daimler-Benz DB 600 ===
In 1933, Daimler-Benz finally received a contract to develop its new engine and to build six examples of the DB 600. For the year after, the DB 600 was the only German aero engine in the 30-litre class. In total, 2,281 DB 600s were built. Unlike the later engines of the DB 600 series, fuel mixture was controlled by carburetor.

Variants:

DB 600 A¹ and B²

Developed in 1934, the A and B variants were identical except for their reduction gear ratios: the former was intended for the Bf 109 single-engine interceptor, the latter variant for the Bf 110 heavy fighter.

Power at sea level:

- Kurzleistung (short-term output): 1000 PS for 5 minutes
- Kampfleistung (combat output): 900 PS for 30 minutes
- Dauerleistung (continuous output): 900 PS, continuous

DB 600C¹ and D²

As the A/B, but with supercharger and 13,120 feet (4000 m) rated altitude.

Power at Sea level:

- Kurzleistung: 950 PS for 5 minutes

Power at 13,120 feet (4000 m) rated altitude:

- Kurzleistung: 910 PS for 5 minutes
- Kampfleistung: 850 PS for 30 minutes
- Dauerleistung: 800 PS, continuous

DB600G¹ and H²

Developed in 1936, the DB 600G and H offered increased power output, otherwise were similar to the C/D variants.

Power at Sea level:

- Startleistung (take-off output): 1050 PS for 1 minute
- Kurzleistung: 920 PS for 5 minutes
- Dauerleistung: 775 PS, continuous

Power at 13,120 feet (4000 m) rated altitude:

- Kurzleistung: 1050 PS for 5 minutes
- Dauerleistung: 800 PS, continuous

¹ Reduction Gearing = 1.55

² Reduction Gearing = 1.88

=== Daimler-Benz DB 601 ===
The DB 601 was a development of the DB 600G with direct fuel injection, which produced better fuel economy, and eliminated engine cut-out due to carburettor induced fuel starvation during negative G-loads. The supercharger in the new engine was driven through a stage-less, automatically controlled hydraulic clutch. The supercharger speed was adjusted via the slip in the clutch, controlled by a barometric device. This solution minimized the power loss typical of multi-speed superchargers with fixed supercharger gear ratios.

The assembly of the first prototypes began in September 1934, designated as DB 601 V. The first powered flight of a DB 601/0 was in a Ju 52 testbed on 11 June 1936. The first prototype with the direct fuel injection, designated as F4E, was test run in 1935, and an order for 150 engines was placed in February 1937. Serial production begun in November 1937, and ended in 1943, after 19,000 examples of all types were produced.

As in previous DB 600s, all DB 601-series had 33.9 litre displacement. It was installed in the Heinkel He 112 (in 1937), the Heinkel He 111 (1938), the Fieseler Fi 167 (1938), the Messerschmitt Bf 109E (1938) and various experimental types.

=== Daimler-Benz DB 602 ===
A 16-cylinder airship diesel engine, only related to the DB 600 by the manufacturer.

=== Daimler-Benz DB 604 ===
An X-24 design based on the DB 600.

== See also ==
Related development

- Daimler-Benz DB 600
- Daimler-Benz DB 601
- Daimler-Benz DB 603
- Daimler-Benz DB 605

Comparable engines

- Allison V-1710
- Hispano-Suiza 12Y
- Junkers Jumo 210
- Junkers Jumo 211
- Klimov M-105
- Mikulin AM-35
- Rolls-Royce Merlin

Related lists

- List of aircraft engines
- List of aircraft engines of Germany during World War II

== Bibliography ==
- Mankau, Heinz and Peter Petrick. Messerschmitt Bf 110, Me 210, Me 410. Raumfahrt, Germany: Aviatic Verlag, 2001. ISBN 3-925505-62-8.
- Neil Gregor Daimler-Benz in the Third Reich. Yale University Press, 1998
