= Henschel Hs 124 =

1936 light bomber

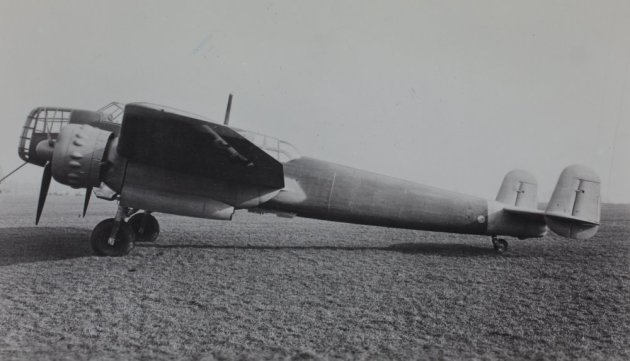

General information
- Manufacturer: Henschel & Son
- Primary user: Luftwaffe
- Number built: 2

History
- First flight: Spring 1936

The Henschel Hs 124 was Henschel's entry into the Luftwaffe's twin-engine Kampfzerstörer (heavy fighter/light bomber) requirement, but was abandoned after this programme was split into separate Zerstörer (heavy fighter) and Schnellbomber (fast bomber) requirements. Three prototypes were planned, but only two were built

The first prototype, the Hs 124 V1 had two liquid-cooled 12-cylinder Junkers Jumo 210A engines of 449 kW each (610 hp). It was fitted with a rotating turret with two 7.92mm MG 15 machine guns in the nose.

The Hs 124 V2 had two 870 PS (860 hp; 640 kW) BMW 132Dc 9-cylinder radial engines and was armed with two 20 mm Mauser cannon, as well as a 7.92mm MG 15 machine gun, carrying up to 600 kg of bombs.

The proposed Hs 124 V3 was intended to have two 20mm MG FF cannon and two 7.92mm MG 17 machine guns in a solid nose, but was never built. The internal bomb bay of the Hs 124 was intended to hold six 100 kg bombs, or additional fuel plus eight 50 kg bombs on an under-fuselage rack and two more under each wing.

== Specifications (Hs 124 V2) ==
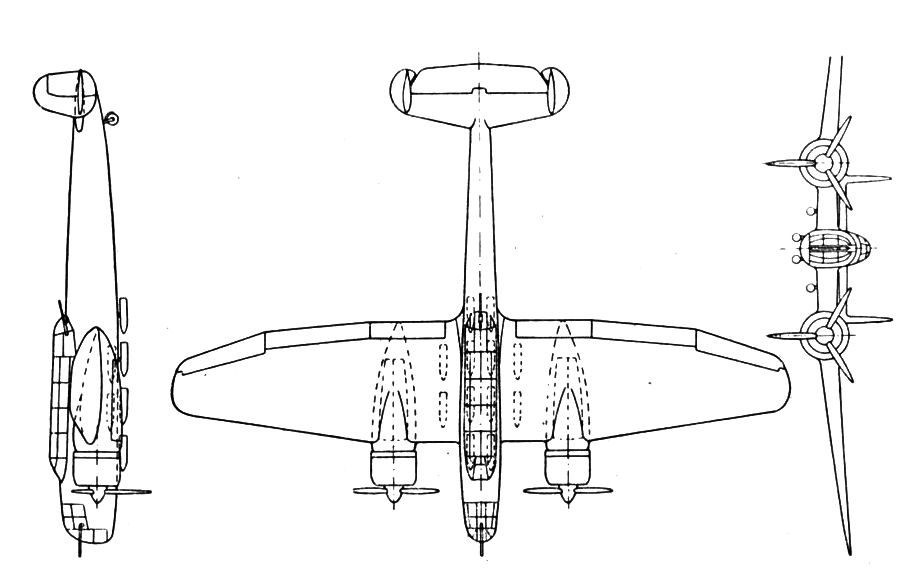
Henschel Hs 124 3-view drawing from L'Aerophile September 1939

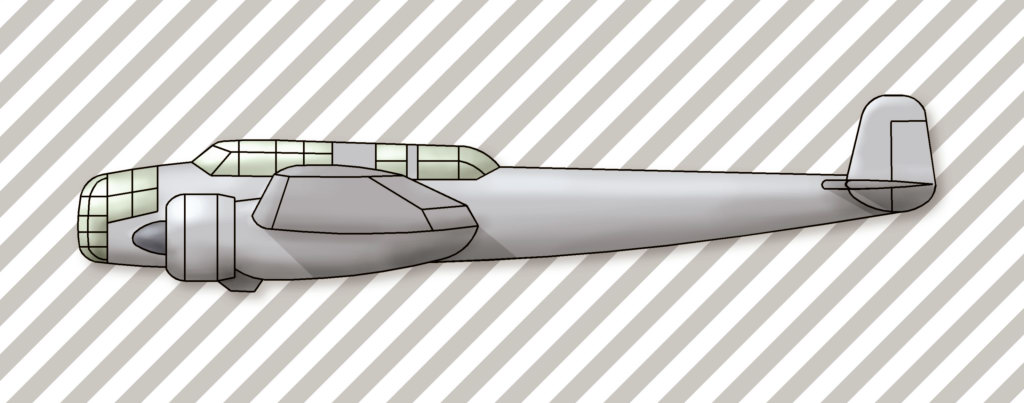
Henschel Hs 124 profile

Data from Warplanes of the Third Reich, Die Deutsche Luftrüstung 1933–1945 Vol.3 – Flugzeugtypen Henschel-Messerschmitt

General characteristics

- Crew: 3 (pilot, radio operator/gunner and bombardier)
- Length: 14.5 m (47 ft 7 in)
- Wingspan: 18.2 m (59 ft 9 in)
- Height: 3.75 m (12 ft 4 in)
- Wing area: 54.6 m^{2} (588 sq ft)
- Empty weight: 4,250 kg (9,370 lb)
- Max takeoff weight: 7,230 kg (15,939 lb)
- Powerplant: 2 × BMW 132Dc 9-cylinder air-cooled radial piston engines 870 PS (860 hp; 640 kW)
- Propellers: 3-bladed variable-pitch propellers

Performance

- Maximum speed: 435 km/h (270 mph, 235 kn) at 3,000 m (9,800 ft)
- Landing speed: 110 km/h (68 mph; 59 kn)
- Range: 4,200 km (2,600 mi, 2,300 nmi)
- Service ceiling: 7,000 m (23,000 ft)
- Time to altitude: 6,000 m (20,000 ft) in 17 minutes 30 seconds

Armament

- Guns: 2 × 20mm Mauser cannon, 1× 7.92mm MG 15 machine guns
- Bombs: 6× 100 kg (220 lb) bombs internally or 12× 50 kg (110 lb) bombs externally

== See also ==
Related development

- Henschel Hs 127

Aircraft of comparable role, configuration, and era

- Breguet 690
- Dornier Do 17
- Curtiss XA-14
- Focke-Wulf Fw 57
- Fokker G.1
- Fokker T.V
- Martin A-15
- Messerschmitt Bf 110
- Stearman XA-21
- Tupolev SB

Related lists

- List of military aircraft of Germany

== Bibliography ==
- Green, William. Warplanes of the Third Reich. New York:Doubleday, 1972. ISBN 0-385-05782-2.
- Munson, Kenneth (1978). German Aircraft Of World War 2 in colour. Poole, Dorset, UK: Blandford Press. ISBN 0-7137-0860-3.
