= Henschel DH 440 =

German diesel-hydraulic locomotive

DH 440
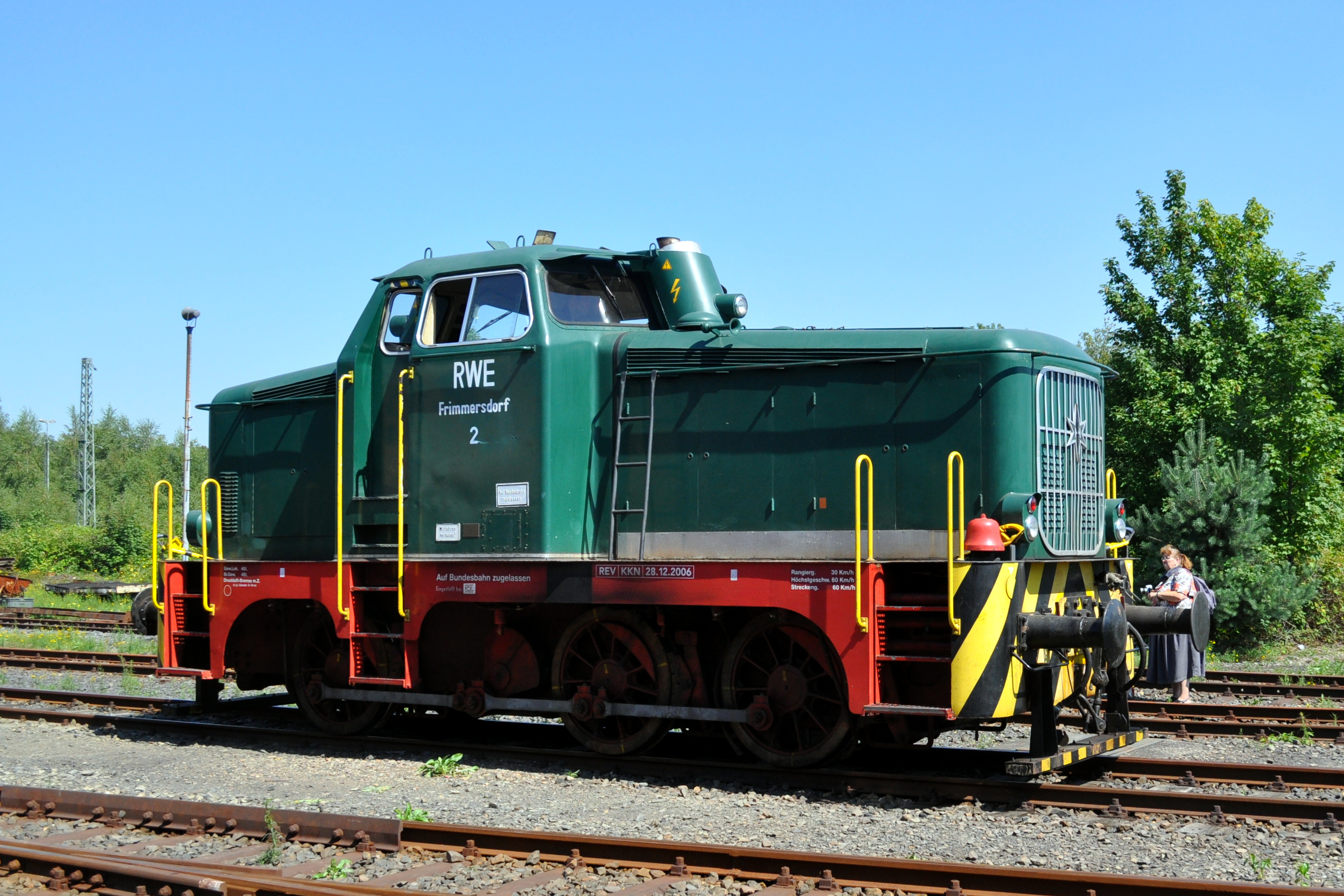
- RWE 2 at the Rheinisches Industriebahnmuseum, Nippes (2010).
Type and origin
- Power type: Diesel
- Builder: Henschel
- Build date: 1956–1958
- Total produced: 6
Specifications
- Configuration
  - Whyte: 0-6-0DM
  - UIC: C
- Gauge: 1,435 mm (4 ft 8 1/2 in)
- Length: 9.44 m (30 ft 11 5/8 in)
- Loco weight: 40.5 t (39.9 long tons; 44.6 short tons)
- Prime mover: MAN W8V17,5/22A
- RPM range: 1100
- Engine type: Straight-8 four-stroke diesel
- Cylinders: 8
- Cylinder size: 175 mm × 220 mm (6.9 in × 8.7 in)
- Transmission: hydraulic, Voith L37U
Performance figures
- Maximum speed: 60 km/h (37 mph)
- Power output: 440 hp (330 kW)

The DH 440 is a type of diesel-hydraulic locomotive built by Henschel in 1956–58 as one of their second-generation diesel locomotive types. They had wheel arrangement C, with three axles powered through a jackshaft.

Six units of the type were built, of which three were bought by the Danish State Railways (DSB) and designated Class MH, numbered 201–203. These formed the basis for the 120 locomotives MH 301–420, built by Danish company Frichs without licence from Henschel. The other three units were purchased by different German industrial railways.
