= Messerschmitt Bf 110 =

1936 heavy fighter family by Messerschmitt

Bf 110
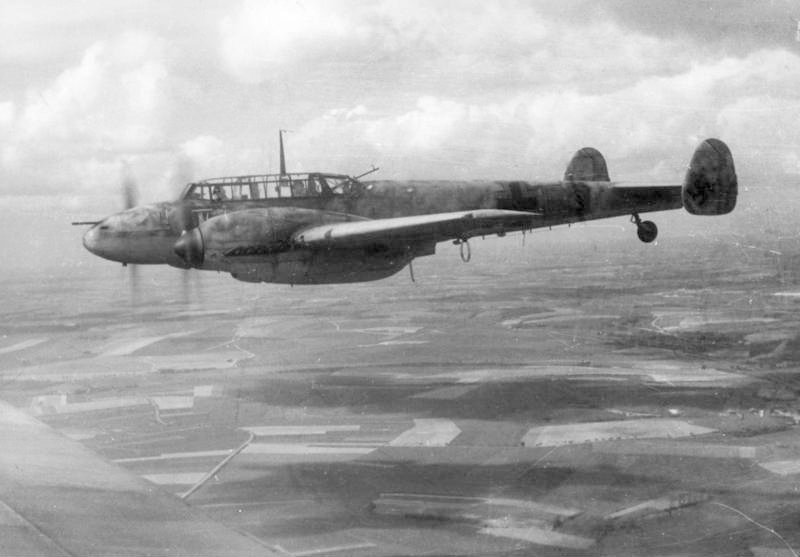
- Bf 110 of Nachtjagdgeschwader 4 (1943)

General information
- Type: Heavy fighter; Fighter-bomber; Night fighter
- Manufacturer: Bayerische Flugzeugwerke (BFW); Messerschmitt
- Primary users: Luftwaffe: Hungarian Air Force; Regia Aeronautica; Romanian Air Force
- Number built: 6,170

History
- Introduction date: 1937
- First flight: 12 May 1936
- Retired: 1945 (Luftwaffe)
- Variants: Messerschmitt Bf 161; Messerschmitt Bf 162
- Developed into: Messerschmitt Me 210

The Messerschmitt Bf 110, often known unofficially as the Me 110, (Note: Because it was built before Bayerische Flugzeugwerke became Messerschmitt AG in July 1938, the Bf 110 was never officially given the designation Me 110.) is a twin-engined Zerstörer (destroyer, heavy fighter), fighter-bomber (Jagdbomber or Jabo), and night fighter (Nachtjäger) designed by the German aircraft company Bayerische Flugzeugwerke (BFW) and produced by successor company Messerschmitt. It was primarily operated by the Luftwaffe and was active throughout the Second World War.

Development of the Bf 110 commenced during the first half of the 1930s; one early proponent of the type was Hermann Göring, who believed its heavy armament, speed, and range would make it the premier offensive fighter of the Luftwaffe. Early variants were armed with a pair of MG FF 20 mm cannon, four 7.92 mm (.323 in) MG 17 machine guns, and one 7.92 mm (.323 in) MG 15 machine gun for defence (later variants would replace the MG FFs with MG 151s and the rear gunner station would be armed with the twin-barreled MG 81Z). Development work on an improved type to replace the Bf 110 – the Messerschmitt Me 210 – began before the conflict started, but its shakedown troubles resulted in the Bf 110 soldiering on until the end of the war in various roles. Its intended replacements, the aforementioned Me 210 and the significantly improved Me 410 Hornisse, never fully replaced the Bf 110.

The Bf 110 served with considerable success in the early campaigns in Poland, Norway, and France. The primary weakness of the Bf 110 was its lack of manoeuvrability, although this could be mitigated with better tactics. This weakness was exploited by the RAF, when Bf 110s were flown as close escort to German bombers during the Battle of Britain. When British bombers began targeting German territory with nightly raids, some Bf 110-equipped units were converted to night fighters, a role to which the aircraft was well suited. After the Battle of Britain, the Bf 110 enjoyed a successful period as an air superiority fighter and strike aircraft in other theatres and defended Germany from strategic air attack by day against the United States Army Air Forces (USAAF)'s Eighth Air Force, until an American change in fighter tactics rendered them increasingly vulnerable to developing American air supremacy over the Reich as 1944 began.

During the Balkans and North African campaigns and on the Eastern Front, the Bf 110 rendered valuable ground support to the German Army as a potent fighter-bomber. Later in the conflict, it was developed into a formidable radar-equipped night fighter, becoming the principal night-fighting aircraft of the Luftwaffe. The majority of the German night fighter aces flew the Bf 110 at some point during their combat careers and the top night fighter ace, Major Heinz-Wolfgang Schnaufer, flew it exclusively and claimed 121 victories in 164 sorties. In addition to its use by the Luftwaffe, other operators of the type included the Hungarian Air Force, the Regia Aeronautica, and the Romanian Air Force.

== Design and development ==
=== Genesis and competition ===
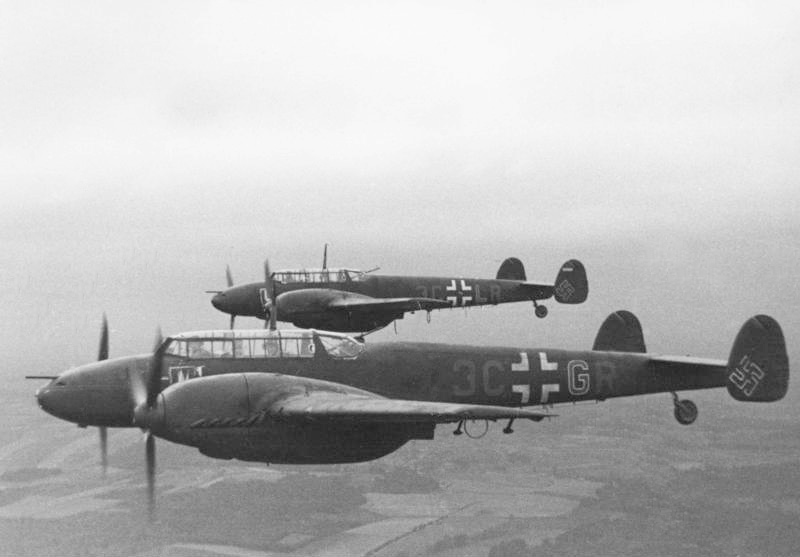
Bf 110s in France in 1942

Throughout the 1930s, the air forces of many major military powers were engaged in a transition from biplane to monoplane designs. Most concentrated on the single-engined fighter aircraft, but the problem of range arose. The Ministry of Aviation (RLM, for Reichsluftfahrtministerium), at the encouragement of Hermann Göring, issued a request for a new multipurpose fighter called the Kampfzerstörer (battle destroyer) with long range and an internal bomb bay. This request called for a twin-engined, three-seat, all-metal monoplane that was armed with cannon and a bomb bay. Of the seven companies approached, only Bayerische Flugzeugwerke (which later became Messerschmitt), Focke-Wulf, and Henschel responded to the request.

The Focke-Wulf design, the Focke-Wulf Fw 57, had a wingspan of 25.6 m (84 ft) and was powered by a pair of DB 600 engines. It was armed with two 20 mm MG FF cannons in the nose, while a third was positioned in a dorsal turret. The Fw 57 V1 flew in 1936, but its performance was poor and the machine crashed. The Henschel Hs 124 was similar in construction layout to the Fw 57, equipped with two Jumo 210C for the V1. The V2 used the BMW 132Dc radial engines generating 870 PS compared with the 640 PS Jumo. The armament consisted of a single rearward-firing 7.92 mm (.312 in) MG 15 machine gun and a single forward-firing 20 mm MG FF cannon.

Bayerische Flugzeugwerke omitted the internal bomb load requirement from the RLM directive to increase the armament element of the RLM's specification. The Bf 110 proved to be far superior to its rivals in providing the speed, range, and firepower to meet its role requirements. Accordingly, Bayerische Flugzeugwerke's submission bested Focke-Wulf, Henschel, and Arado, and thus the firm was given the funds to build several prototype aircraft. By the end of 1935, the Bf 110 had evolved into an all-metal, low-wing cantilever monoplane of semimonocoque design featuring twin vertical stabilizers and powered by two DB 600A engines. The design was also fitted with Handley-Page wing slots (actually, leading-edge slats).

=== Early variants ===
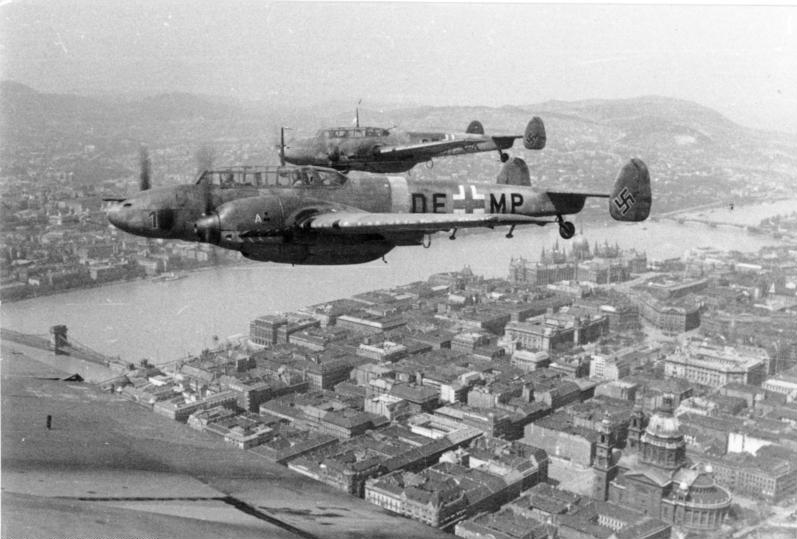
Bf 110s in flight above Budapest, 1944

By luck (and pressure by Ernst Udet), the RLM reconsidered the ideas of the Kampfzerstörer and began focusing on the Zerstörer. Due to these changes, the Bayerische Flugzeugwerke design better fit the Ministry's requests. On 12 May 1936, Rudolf Opitz flew the first Bf 110 from Augsburg. As many pre-war designs found, the engine technologies promised were of insufficient reliability. Even with the temperamental DB 600 engines, the RLM found that the Bf 110, while not as manoeuvrable as desired, was rather faster than its original request specified, as well as faster than the front-line fighter, the Bf 109 B-1. The order for four pre-production A-0 units was promptly placed, the first of which was delivered in January 1937. Amid this phase of testing, both the Focke-Wulf Fw 187 and Henschel Hs 124 competitors were rejected and the Bf 110 was ordered into full rate production.

The initial deliveries of the Bf 110 encountered several delays with their DB 600 engines, which forced Bayerische Flugzeugwerke to install Junkers Jumo 210B engines, leaving the Bf 110 seriously underpowered and able to reach a top speed of only 431 km/h (268 mph). The armament of the A-0 units was also limited to four nose-mounted 7.92 mm (.312 in) MG 17 machine guns. Even without delivery of the DB 600 engines, Bayerische Flugzeugwerke began assembly of the Bf 110 in mid-1937. As the DB 600 engines continued to have problems, Bayerische Flugzeugwerke was forced to keep on using Jumo motors, the 210G, which supplied 515 kW (700 PS) each (versus the 471 kW/640 PS supplied by the 210B). Three versions of the Bf 110B were built, the B-1, which had four 7.92 mm (.312 in) MG 17 machine guns and two 20 mm MG FF cannons, the B-2 reconnaissance version, which had a camera in place of the cannons and the B-3, which was used as a trainer, with the cannons replaced by extra radio equipment. Only 45 Bf 110Bs were built before the Jumo 210G engine production line ended. The major identifier of the -A and -B-series Bf 110s was the very large "mouth" bath radiators located under each engine.

In late 1938, the DB 601 B-1 engines became available in quantity, and thus were promptly adopted on the Bf 110C. In the adoption of this engine, the design teams opted to remove the radiators under the engine nacelles and replace them with water/glycol radiators for the C-series airframes, placing them under the wing just outboard of each nacelle, otherwise similar in installation, appearance and function to those on the Bf 109E. With the DB 601 engine, the Bf 110's maximum speed increased to 541 km/h (336 mph) with a range around 1,094 km (680 mi). A compact oil cooler and air scoop remained under each engine nacelle for the remainder of the Bf 110's production run.

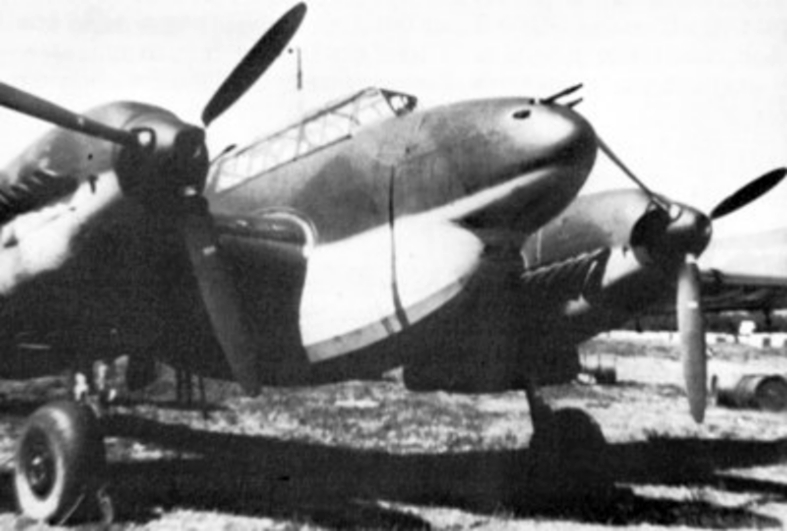
Bf 110D-0 with an early "dachshund's belly" fuel tank

First conceived in the latter half of 1939, the Bf 110D featured a series of modifications and improvements to increase its range. The initial D-series version, the Bf 110D-0 was designed to add a large, streamlined, 1,050-litre (277 U.S. gallon) ventral fuel tank built under the fuselage, which required a substantially sized, conformal streamlined ventral fuselage fairing extending from halfway back under the nose to the rear of the cockpit glazing, inspiring the nickname Dackelbauch (dachshund's belly). The D-1 was also set up to accept a pair of fin-equipped 900-litre (238 U.S. gallon) drop tanks, one under each wing, increasing the total fuel capacity to 4,120 litres (1,090 US gallons). The substantial added drag of the early "dachshund's belly" ventral fuselage tank in test flights mandated its omission from production D-1s, although they were still prepared to mount an improved, more streamlined, version. D-1s so equipped were known as D-1/R1, whereas the D-1/R2 was equipped with two 900-litre drop tanks and a droppable 85-litre oil tank. Later D-2 and D-3 versions retained the twin underwing 900-litre drop tank capability, using multipurpose ordnance racks capable of holding either drop tanks or carrying bombs.

=== Later production variants ===
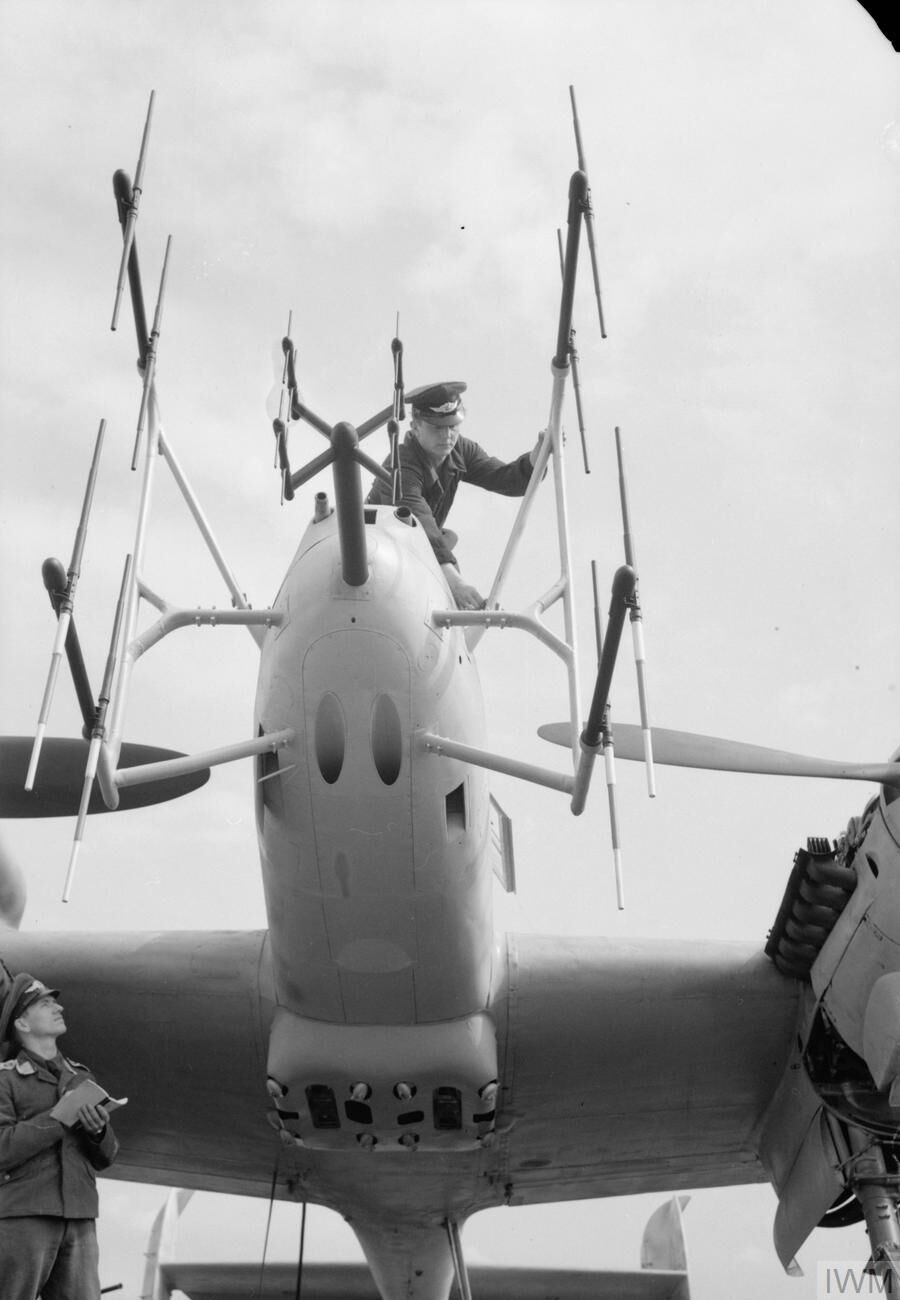
FuG 220 and FuG 202 (centre) "Lichtenstein" SN-2 VHF band, and B/C UHF band night fighter radar antennas on the nose of a Bf 110 G-4 being serviced by Luftwaffe ground crew on Grove airfield, Denmark postwar in August 1945, before the aircraft was sent to the UK for research.

The production of the Bf 110 was put on a low priority in 1941 in expectation of its replacement by the Me 210. During this time, two versions of the Bf 110 were developed, the E and F models. The E was designed as a fighter bomber (Zerstörer Jabo), able to carry four 50 kg (110 lb) ETC 50 racks under the wing, along with the centreline ETC 500 bomb rack. The first E, the Bf 110 E-1 was originally powered by the DB 601B engine, but shifted to the DB 601P as they became available in quantity. In total, 856 Bf 110E models were built between August 1940 and January 1942. The E models also had upgraded armour and some fuselage upgrades to support the added weight. Most pilots of the Bf 110E considered the aircraft slow and unresponsive, with one former Bf 110 pilot commenting the E was "rigged and a total dog."

The Bf 110F featured the new DB 601F engines, which produced 993 kW/1,350 PS (almost double the power the original Jumo engines provided), which allowed for upgraded armour, strengthening, and increased weight with no loss in performance. Three common versions of the F model existed. Pilots typically felt the Bf 110F to be the best of the Bf 110 line, being fully aerobatic and in some respects smoother to fly than the Bf 109, though not as fast. Eventually, 512 Bf 110F models were completed between December 1941 and December 1942, when production gave way to the Bf 110G.

==== Bf 110G production details ====
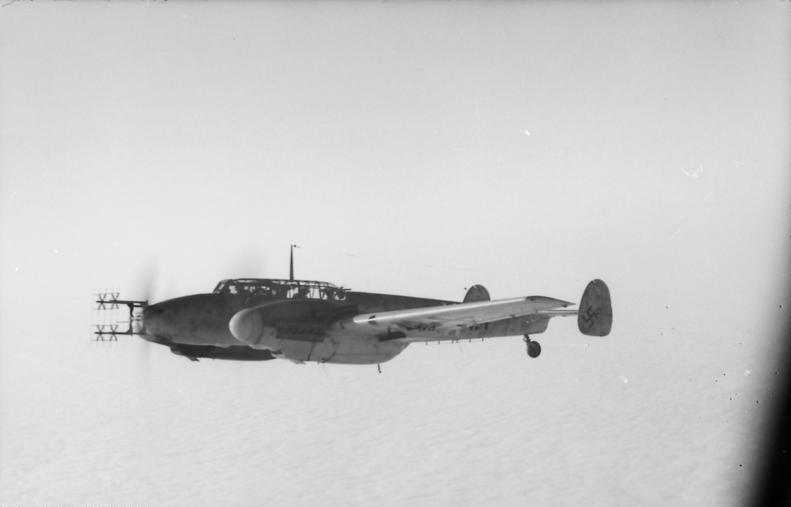
An early-model Bf 110G of 9./NJG 3 with Matratze UHF radar antennas for FuG 202/212 use

Although the Me 210 entered service in mid-1941, it was plagued with problems and was withdrawn from service for further development. In the wake of the failure of the Me 210, the Bf 110G was designed. The G model was fitted with DB 605B engines, producing 1,085 kW (1,475 PS) at their Notleistung (war emergency) top-level setting, and 997 kW (1,355 PS) at 5.8 km (19,000 ft) altitude. The Bf 110G also had upgraded nose armament, and underwent some changes which improved the aerodynamics of the aircraft. The rear cockpit access was moved forward from the transversely hinged, "tilt-open" rearmost canopy glazing to a side/top hinged opening section of the main canopy, opening to port, with a new rearmost framed glazing section fixed in place. No Bf 110 G-1 existed, so the Bf 110 G-2 became the baseline Bf 110G. A large number of Rüstsätze field conversion packs were available, making the G subtype the most versatile production version of the Bf 110.

The initial batch of six preseries production G-0 aircraft built in June 1942 were followed by 797 G-2, 172 G-3 and 2,293 of the night fighter-dedicated, three-seater G-4 models; built between December 1942 and April 1945. Pilots reported the Bf 110G to be a "mixed bag" in the air, in part due to all changes between the G and F series. The Bf 110G was considered a superior gun platform with excellent all-around visibility, and considered, until the advent of the Heinkel He 219, to be one of the best night fighters flown by the Luftwaffe.

=== Armament ===
The Bf 110's main strength was its ability to mount unusually powerful air-to-air weaponry. Early versions had four 7.92 mm (.312 in) MG 17 machine guns in the upper nose and two 20 mm MG FF/M cannons fitted in the lower part of the nose. Later versions replaced the MG FF/M with the more powerful 20 mm MG 151/20 cannons and many G-series aircraft, especially those which served in the bomber-destroyer role, had two 30 mm (1.18 in) MK 108 cannons fitted instead of the MG 17. The defensive armament initially consisted of a single, flexibly mounted 7.92 mm (.312 in) MG 15 machine gun. Late F-series and prototype G-series were upgraded to a 7.92 mm (.312 in) MG 81 machine gun with a higher rate of fire, and the G-series was equipped with the twin-barreled MG 81Z. Many G-series night fighters were retrofitted or factory-built with the Schräge Musik off-bore gun system, which fired upward at an oblique angle for shooting down bombers while passing underneath; it was frequently equipped with two 20 mm MG FF/M, but field installations of the 20 mm MG 151/20 or 30 mm (1.18 in) MK 108 cannons were also used. The Schräge Musik weapons were typically mounted immediately in front of the rear cockpit.

The Bf 110 G-2/R1 was also capable of employing armament such as the Bordkanone-series 37 mm (1.46 in) BK 3,7 autofed cannon, mounted in a conformal ventral gun pod under the fuselage. A single hit from this weapon was usually enough to destroy any Allied bomber.

The initial Bf 110 C-1/B fighter-bomber could carry two 250 kg (551 lb), two 500 kg (1,102 lb), or two 1,000 kg (2,204 lb) bombs on two ETC 500 racks under the fuselage and, starting with the Bf 110 E-0, could be supplemented by four additional 50 kg (110 lb) bombs on ETC 50 racks under the wing.

=== Night fighter ===
After a period of use on bombing and reconnaissance, the type found its niche during the winter of 1940-41 as a night fighter in defensive operations. At first, the three main crew members had no special equipment for night operations and relied on their eyes alone to find enemy aircraft in the dark. Ground-controlled interception began from mid 1941 and the Bf 110 began to take its toll on RAF bombers and was soon an aircraft to be feared. Airborne radar was used experimentally during 1941, effective up to a maximum distance of 3.5 km/ 2.2 miles and capable of bringing the Bf 110 to within 200 m/655 ft of a target. However, its effectiveness varied massively during the latter half of the conflict as a result of Allied countermeasures and German radar advances alike.

Becoming active around July 1942, the Bf 110F-4 was the first version to be designed specifically as a night fighter. It was something of a stop-gap measure, though armed with four 7.92mm/ 0.31 in machine guns and two 20 mm / 0.78 in cannon. The Bf 110 remained the principal night fighter of the Luftwaffe through to 1944.

== Variants ==
Bf 110 V1

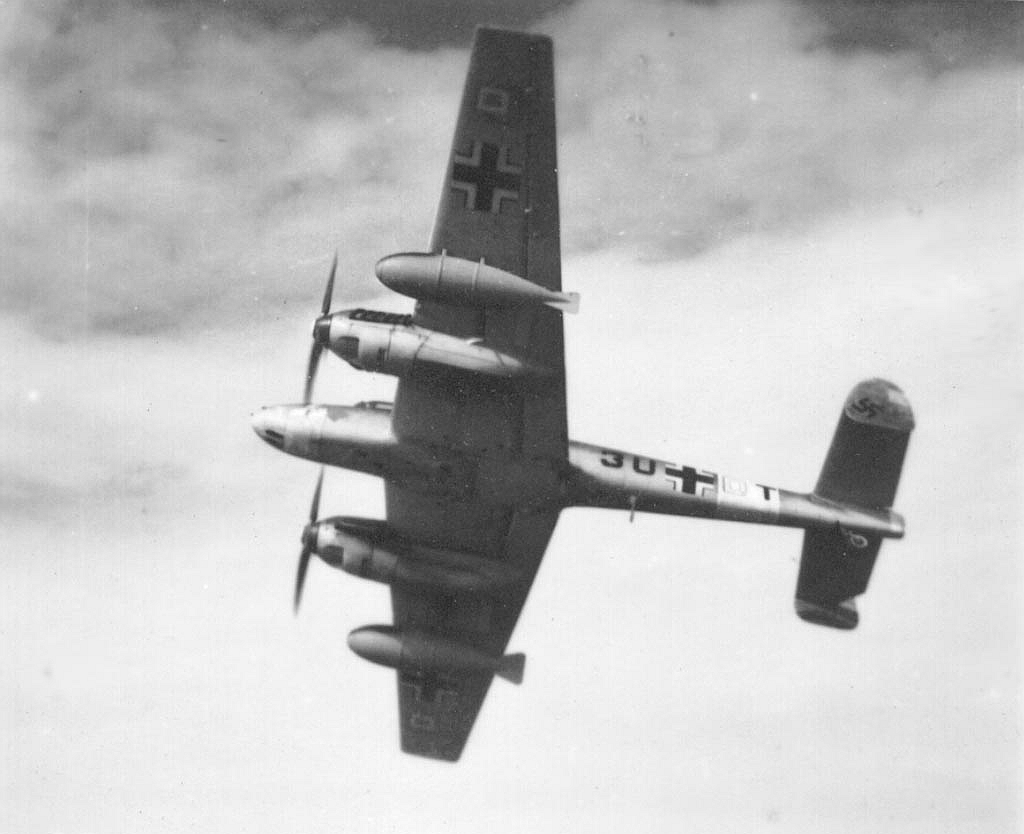
Bf 110 D-1 with twin 900-litre drop tanks with vertical fins, from 9.Staffel/ZG 26, on a Regia Aeronautica photo

First flown 12 May 1936 using two Daimler-Benz DB 600 engines

Bf 110 V2

Completed on 24 October 1936 using two Daimler-Benz DB 600 engines. It was assigned directly to the Luftwaffe test centre at Rechlin. Test pilots were pleased with its speed but disappointed in its manoeuvrability

Bf 110 V3

Same airframe as the V1 and V2 but was intended as a weapons test aircraft and had nose changes for armament. Completed and test flown on 24 December 1936 and also assigned to Rechlin.
Bf 110 A
Prototypes with two Junkers Jumo 210 B engines.
Bf 110 A-0
The designation of the first four pre-production aircraft. Armament consisted of four fixed MG 17 7.92 mm machine guns in the nose and one moveable MG 15 7.92 mm machine gun in the rear cockpit canopy.

Bf 110 B

Small-scale production with two Jumo 210 engines.

Bf 110 B-0
First pre-production aircraft, similar to B-1.
Bf 110 B-1
Zerstörer, four 7.92 mm (.312 in) MG 17 machine guns and two 20 mm MG FF cannons, nose-mounted.
Bf 110 B-2
Reconnaissance, both MG FF cannons removed, and various camera models added.
Bf 110 B-3
Trainer. MG FF cannons removed, and extra radio gear added. Some war weary B-1 were later refitted as B-3s.

Bf 110 C

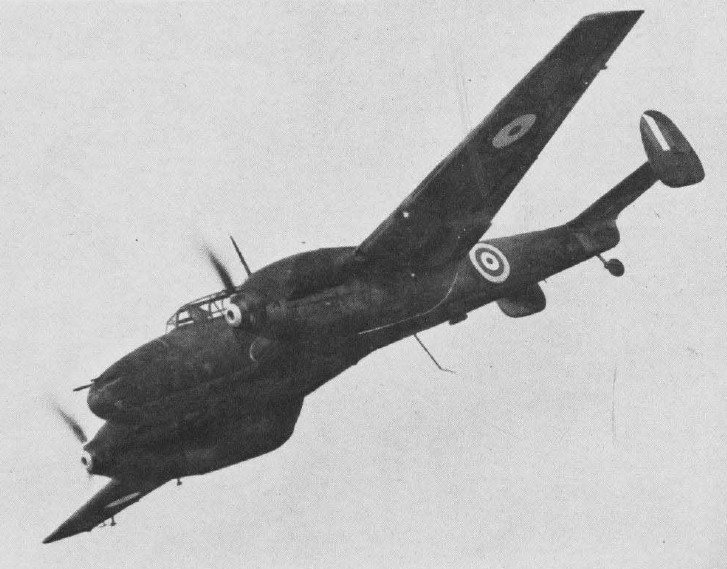
A captured Bf 110C-5 in the service of No. 1426 Flight RAF

First major production series, DB 601 engines.

Bf 110 C-0
Ten pre-production aircraft.
Bf 110 C-1
Zerstörer, DB 601 B-1 engines.
Bf 110 C-2
Zerstörer, fitted with FuG 10 radio, upgraded from FuG III.
Bf 110 C-3
Zerstörer, upgraded 20 mm MG FFs to MG FF/M.
Bf 110 C-4
Zerstörer, upgraded crew armour.

Bf 110 C-4/B
Fighter-bomber based on C-4, fitted with a pair of ETC 500 bomb racks and upgraded DB 601 Ba engines.

Bf 110 C-5
Reconnaissance version based on C-4, both MG FF removed, and Rb 50/30 camera installed, uprated DB 601P engines.
Bf 110 C-6
Experimental Zerstörer, additional single 30 mm (1.18 in) MK 101 cannon in underfuselage mount, DB 601P engines.
Bf 110 C-7
Fighter-bomber based on C-4/B, two ETC 500 centreline bomb racks capable of carrying two 250, 500, or 1,000 kg (2,204 lb) bombs, uprated DB 601P engines.

Bf 110 D

Heavy fighter/fighter-bomber, extreme range versions based on C-series, prepared to operate with external fuel tanks. Often stationed in Norway.

Bf 110 D-0
Prototype using C-3 airframes modified with 1,050 L (277 US gal) belly-mounted tank called Dackelbauch ("dachshund's belly" in German).
Bf 110 D-1
Long-range Zerstörer, modified C series airframes with option to carry Dackelbauch belly tank and underwing drop tanks.

Bf 110 D-1/R1
Long-range Zerstörer, Dackelbauch ventral tank, option to carry additional wing mounted 900 L (240 US gal) drop tanks.
Bf 110 D-1/R2
Long-range Zerstörer, droppable 85 L oil tank under the fuselage instead of Dackelbauch ventral tank, two wing mounted 900 L (240 US gal) drop tanks.

Bf 110 D-2
Long-range Zerstörer, two wing-mounted 300 L (80 US gal) drop tanks and centreline mounted bomb racks for two 500 kg (1,100 lb) bombs.
Bf 110 D-3
Long-range Zerstörer, lengthened tail for rescue dinghy. Either two wing-mounted 300 L (80 US gal) or 900 L (240 US gal) drop tanks could be fitted. Optional fitting of ETC 500 bomb racks (impossible with 900 L drop tanks).
Bf 110 D-4
Long-range recon, both MG FF removed, and Rb 50/30 camera installed, two wing-mounted 300 L or 900 L drop tanks.

Bf 110 E

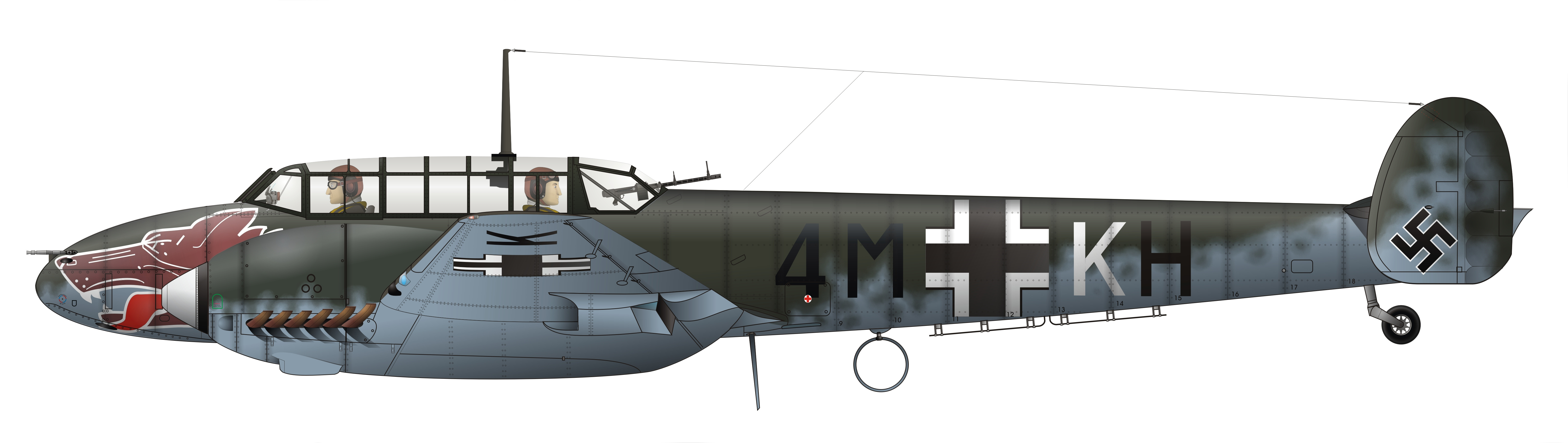
Bf 110 E-1, Ergänzungs-Schlachtgruppe, Dęblin-Irena (Poland 1942).

Mostly fighter bombers, strengthened airframe, up to 1,200 kg (2,650 lb) bombload.

Bf 110 E-0
Pre-production version, Daimler-Benz DB 601B engines, pair of ETC50 bomb racks fitted outboard of engines, armament as C-4.
Bf 110 E-1
Production version of E-0, DB 601P engines.

Bf 110 E-1/U1
Two-crew night fighter conversion, equipped with the Spanner-Anlage infrared homing device.

Bf 110 E-2
DB 601P engines, rear fuselage extension same as for D-3.
Bf 110 E-3
Long-range reconnaissance version, both MG FF removed, and Rb 50/30 camera installed.

Bf 110 F

Same as the E, again strengthened airframe, better armour, two 993 kW (1,350 PS) DB 601F engines.

Bf 110 F-1
Fighter-bomber.
Bf 110 F-2
Long-range Zerstörer, often used against Allied heavy bombers.
Bf 110 F-3
Long-range reconnaissance version.
Bf 110 F-4
The first dedicated night fighter (specially designed for this usage, 3-crew).

Bf 110 G

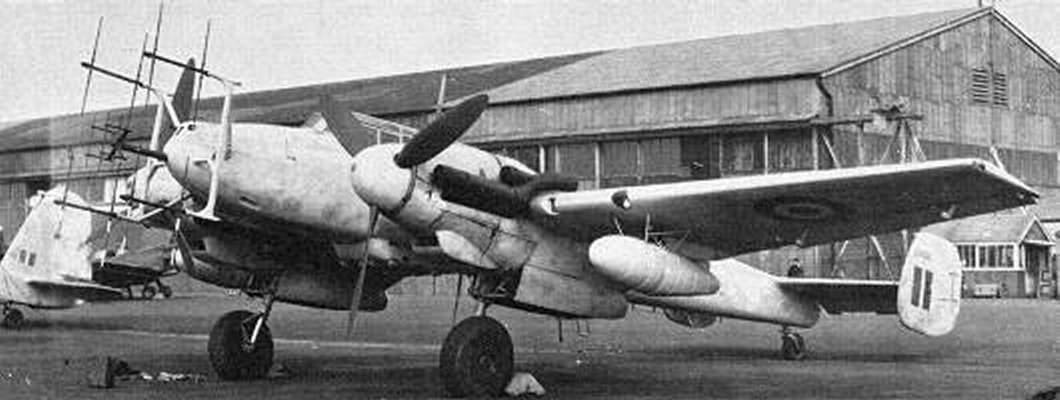
Bf 110 G-4

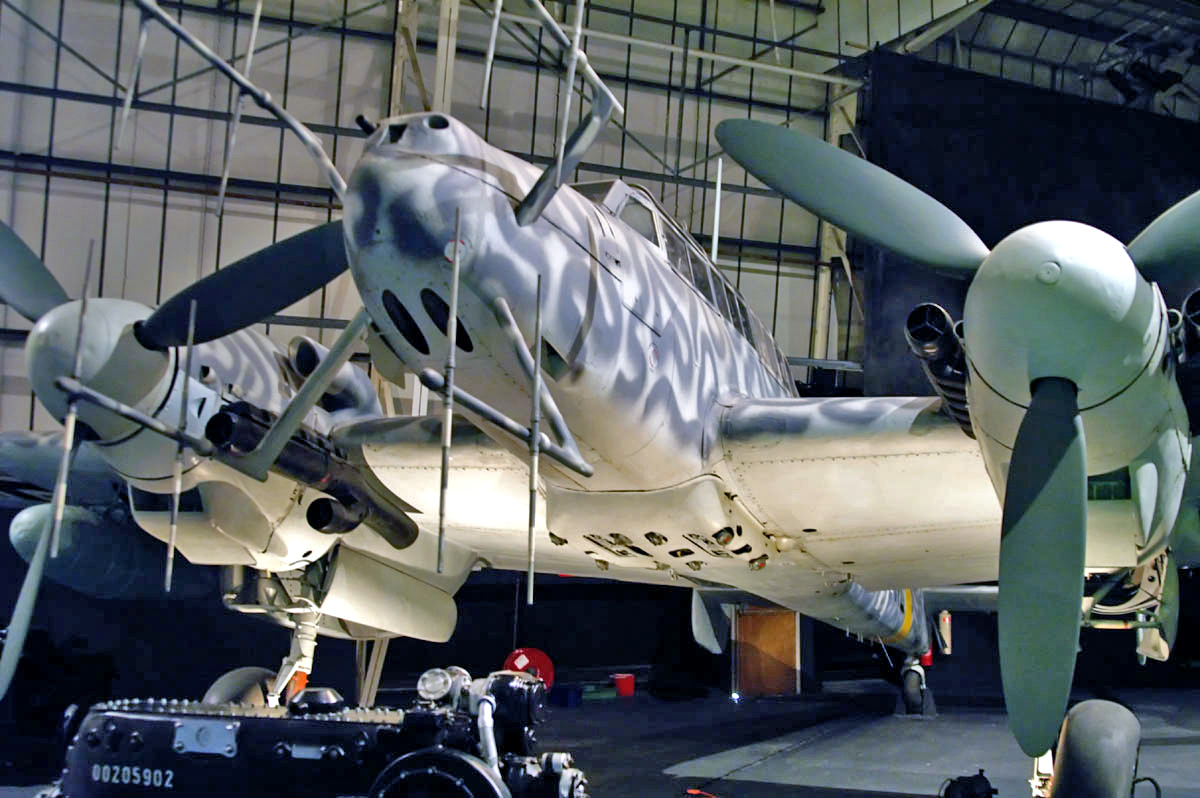
A Bf 110 G-4 night fighter at the Royal Air Force Museum London.

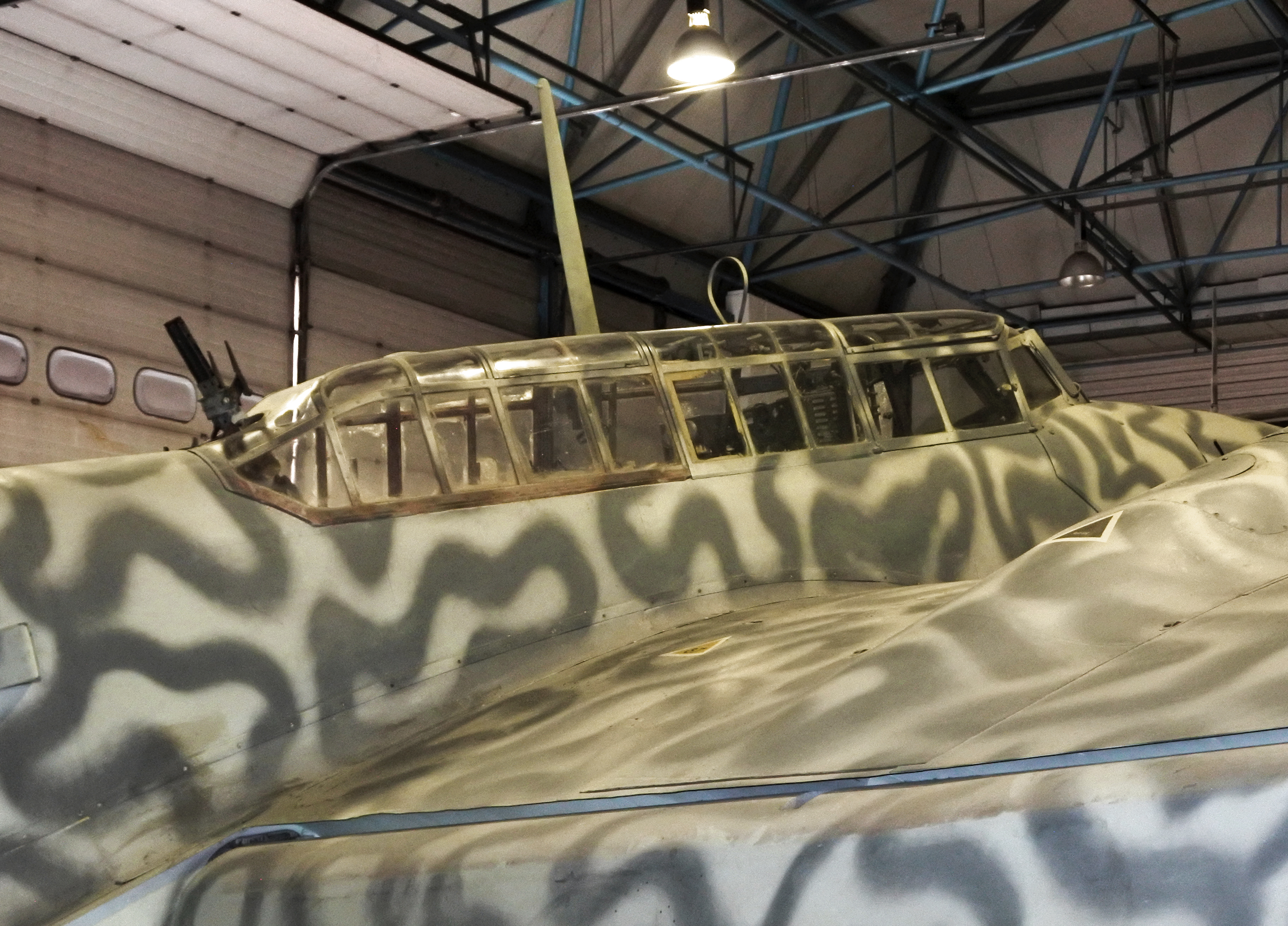
Bf-110 G-4 cockpit; Royal Air Force Museum London.

Improved F-series, two 1,085 kW (1,475 PS) DB 605B engines, tail rudders increased in size.

Bf 110 G-1
Not built.
Bf 110 G-2
Fighter-bomber, fast bomber, destroyer, often used against Allied heavy bombers. (often equipped with rockets).

Bf 110 G-2/R1
Bf 110 G-2 armed with a BK 3,7 under the fuselage.
Bf 110 G-2/R4
Bf 110 G-2 armed with a BK 3,7 under the fuselage and two MK 108 in the nose

Bf 110 G-3
Long-range reconnaissance version.
Bf 110 G-4
Three-crew night fighter, FuG 202/220 Lichtenstein radar, optional Schräge Musik, usually mounted midway down the cockpit with the cannon muzzles barely protruding above the canopy glazing. Multiple combinations of engine boosts, Schräge Musik, radar arrangements and forward firing armament were available in the form of Rüstsätze and Umrüst-Bausätze kits.

Bf 110 H

The final version, similar to the G, was cancelled before any prototypes were ready after important documents were lost in an air raid on the Waggonbau Gotha factory, which was leading the H-development.

== Operators ==
Germany

- Luftwaffe

Hungary

- Royal Hungarian Air Force In December 1944 the Hungarians received 12 or 14 Bf110G-4 nightfighters that served with the 101st Nightfighter Squadron.

Italy

- Regia Aeronautica Italy operated three Bf110C

Romania

- Royal Romanian Air Force Romania operated 23; 12 Bf110C, 2 Bf100E, 9 Bf110F

Soviet Union

- Soviet Air Force operated a few captured Bf 110s. Before the war, one was sold in 1940 for testing the Volkov-Yartsev VYa-23 23mm cannon.

Croatia

- Air Force of the Independent State of Croatia operated 2 Messerschmitt Bf110G-2

United Kingdom

- The Royal Air Force's 1426 Flight operated one captured Bf 110.

== Surviving aircraft ==
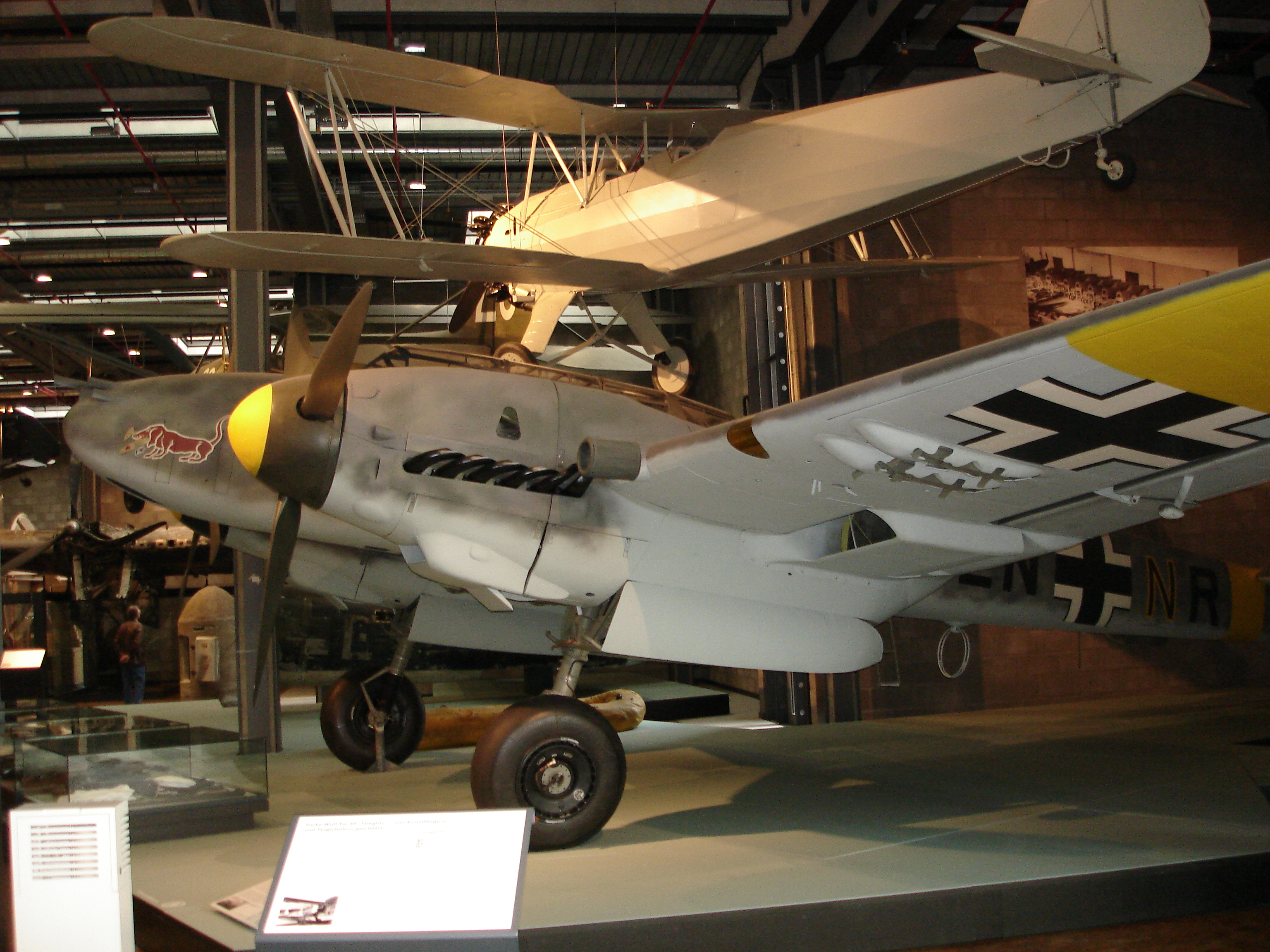
Bf 110 Werk Nr. 5052, Deutsches Technikmuseum Berlin. The nose art emblem on this aircraft is the dachshund of 10.(Z)/JG 5.

Two intact Bf 110s are known to exist:

Messerschmitt Bf 110 G Werk Nr. 730301

This aircraft is displayed as fully assembled at the Royal Air Force Museum London at Hendon, North London. A G-series night fighter, it was likely built in 1944. It served with Nachtjagdgeschwader 3, the unit responsible for the night air defence of Denmark and North Germany until Germany's surrender in May 1945. It was one of five Bf 110s taken by the British for technical evaluation. In 1946, it was selected for preservation by the Air Historical Branch. It was eventually moved to the RAF Museum in 1978, where it has remained ever since.

Messerschmitt Bf 110 F2 Werk Nr. 5052

Displayed at the Deutsches Technikmuseum Berlin.

Additionally, the Technik Museum Speyer preserves the wings and other parts from a Bf 110 that were recovered from a lake in Sweden in 1995. During the war, the aircraft landed on the frozen lake after being damaged by Swedish anti-aircraft fire.

Messerschmitt Bf 110 G4 (unknown Werk Nr.)

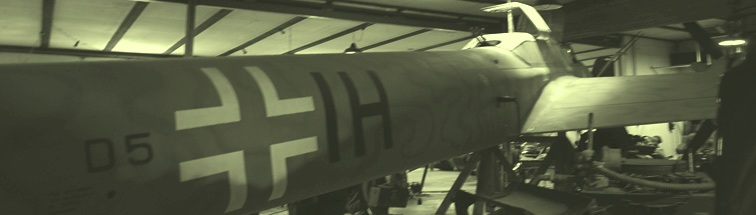
Using spare parts found all over the world the group called "Gillelejegruppen" managed to assemble an intact example of the Bf 110 night-fighter (G4).

This aircraft is made from a wide range of original spare parts found all over the world. It is currently owned and displayed by a private foundation in Denmark.

== Specifications (Bf 110 C-1) ==
3-view line drawing of the Messerschmitt Bf 110

Data from The Warplanes of the Third Reich, Die Deutsche Luftrüstung 1933–1945 Vol.3 – Flugzeugtypen Henschel-Messerschmitt

General characteristics

- Crew: two or three
- Length: 12.0714 m (39 ft 7.25 in)
- Wingspan: 16.2497 m (53 ft 3.75 in)
- Height: 4.128 m (13 ft 6.5 in)
- Wing area: 38.4000 m^{2} (413.334 sq ft)
- Airfoil: root: NACA 2R1 (18.5%); tip: NACA 2R1 (11%)
- Empty weight: 4,425 kg (9,755 lb) * Empty equipped weight: 4,885 kg (10,769 lb)
- Gross weight: 6,028 kg (13,289 lb)
- Max takeoff weight: 6,749 kg (14,880 lb)
- Fuel capacity: 1,272 L (336 US gal; 280 imp gal) in four centre-section tanks
- Powerplant: 2 × Daimler-Benz DB 601A-1 V-12 inverted liquid-cooled piston engines, 780 kW (1,050 hp) each for take-off

820 kW (1,100 hp) at 3,700 m (12,140 ft)

- Propellers: 3-bladed VDM variable-pitch propellers

Performance

- Maximum speed: 475 km/h (295 mph, 256 kn) at sea level; - weight = 13,289 lb (6,028 kg)

525 km/h (326 mph; 283 kn) at 4,000 m (13,120 ft)
541 km/h (336 mph; 292 kn) at 6,000 m (19,685 ft)

- Cruise speed: 262 km/h (163 mph, 141 kn) maximum continuous at sea level

489 km/h (304 mph; 264 kn) maximum continuous at 5,000 m (16,400 ft)
484 km/h (301 mph; 261 kn) maximum continuous at 7,000 m (22,970 ft)
349 km/h (217 mph; 188 kn) economical cruise speed at 4,200 m (13,780 ft)

- Landing speed: 150 km/h (93 mph; 81 kn)
- Range: 774 km (481 mi, 418 nmi) at sea level with normal internal fuel at maximum continuous cruise speed

850 km (530 mi; 460 nmi) at 5,000 m (16,400 ft) at maximum continuous cruise speed

- Range at economical cruise speed: 909 km (565 mi; 491 nmi) at 7,000 m (22,970 ft) at economical cruise speed

1,094 km (680 mi; 591 nmi) at 4,200 m (13,780 ft) at economical cruise speed

- Service ceiling: 10,000 m (32,810 ft)
- Rate of climb: 11 m/s (2,200 ft/min)
- Time to altitude: 6,000 m (19,685 ft) in 10 minutes and 12 seconds
- Wing loading: 173 kg/m^{2} (35 lb/sq ft)
- Power/mass: 0.241 kW/kg (0.147 hp/lb)

Armament

- Guns: ** 2 × 20 mm (0.787 in) MG FF/M cannon (180 rpg—3 drums with 60 rpg, cannon were reloaded by rear gunner or radio operator during flight)
  - 4 × 7.92 mm (0.312 in) MG 17 machine guns (1,000 rpg)
  - 1 × 7.92 mm (0.312 in) MG 15 machine gun for defence

== See also ==
- Rudolf Hess

Related development

- Messerschmitt Bf 161, reconnaissance aircraft based on Bf 110
- Messerschmitt Bf 162, light bomber based on Bf 110
- Messerschmitt Me 210
- Messerschmitt Me 310
- Messerschmitt Me 410 Hornisse

Aircraft of comparable role, configuration, and era

- Bristol Beaufighter
- Focke-Wulf Fw 187 Falke
- Fokker G.I
- Kawasaki Ki-45
- Lockheed P-38 Lightning
- Nakajima J1N
- Petlyakov Pe-2
- Potez 630 C3
- PZL.38 Wilk
- Varga RMI-1 X/H
- Westland Whirlwind

Related lists

- List of aircraft of World War II
- List of military aircraft of Germany
