= Henschel Hs 127 =

German World War II bomber prototype

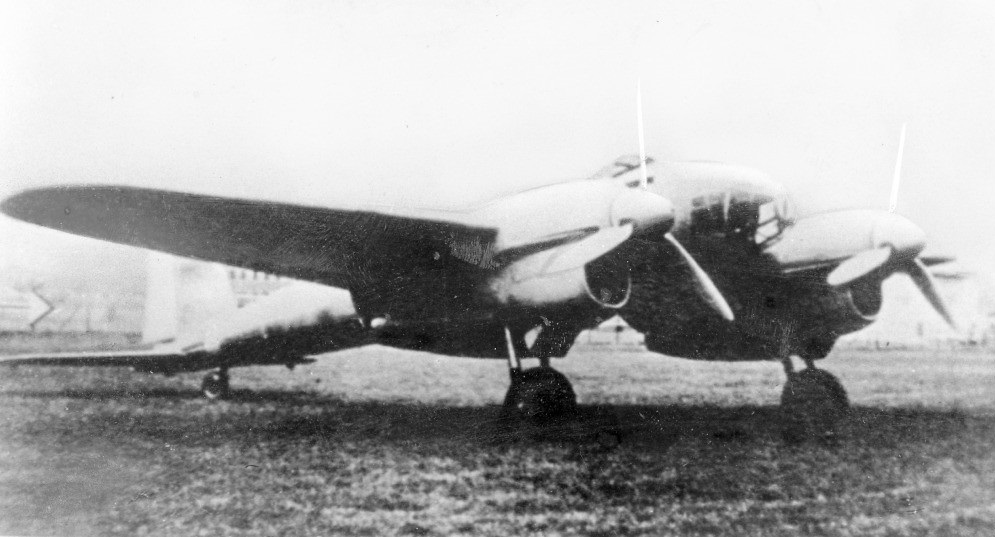

General information
- Type: Bomber
- National origin: Germany
- Manufacturer: Henschel & Son
- Number built: 2

History
- First flight: 1937

The Henschel Hs 127 was a German bomber that was built as two prototypes, but cancelled without entering mass production.

== Design and development ==
In 1935, the RLM (Reichsluftfahrtministerium - German Ministry of Aviation) published requests for a fast tactical bomber. Junkers, Focke-Wulf, Messerschmitt and Henschel all submitted designs.

According to RLM specifications, the aircraft was to be able to maintain a speed of 500 km/h (313 mph) for 30 minutes, take-off to a height of 20 m (65 ft) in not more than 750 m (2,460 ft), and carry one defensive machine gun and 500–800 kg (1,100-1,760 lb) of bombs. The crew was to consist of a pilot, a bombardier/navigator and a gunner.

Focke-Wulf soon withdrew from participation, so three projects were presented: the future Hs 127, the Junkers Ju 88 and the Messerschmitt Bf 162. Prototypes were ordered of all three, with new Daimler-Benz DB 600 engines to be installed on all three types.

The maiden flight of the Hs 127 V1 was at the end of 1937. The aircraft was smaller and lighter than the Ju 88 and had a very good top speed of 565 km/h (353 mph), but the Ju 88 was chosen because of its bigger bomb load.

In May 1938, the contract for Hs 127 development was cancelled by the RLM and the third prototype was not finished.

The Hs 127 was a low-wing monoplane with monocoque fuselage. Its two-spar wing had an all-metal covering and was equipped with flaps. Its retractable gear had shock-absorbers to facilitate operations from poor airstrips. All three crew members sat in the nose.

== Specifications ==
Data from The warplanes of the Third Reich

General characteristics

- Crew: 3
- Length: 12 m (39 ft 4 in)
- Wingspan: 18 m (59 ft 1 in)
- Empty weight: 5,000 kg (11,023 lb)
- Gross weight: 8,000 kg (17,637 lb)
- Powerplant: 2 × Daimler-Benz DB 600 V-12 inverted liquid-cooled piston engine, 630 kW (850 hp) each

Performance

- Maximum speed: 568 km/h (353 mph, 307 kn)

Armament
1,500 kg (3,300 lb) bombload

== See also ==
Related lists

- List of World War II military aircraft of Germany
- List of military aircraft of Germany
- List of WW2 Luftwaffe aircraft prototype projects
