= Messerschmitt Bf 162 =

German light bomber prototype

Bf 162
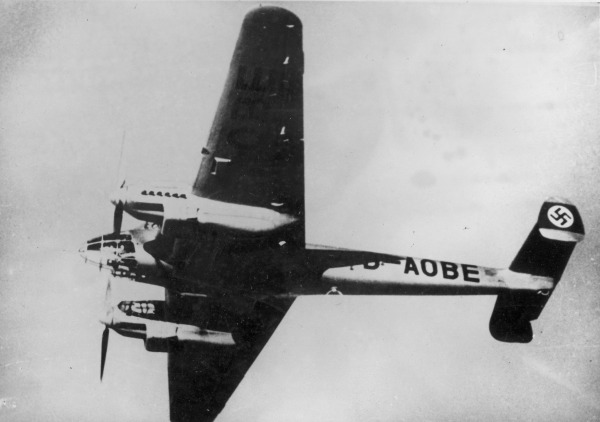
- Bf 162 V2

General information
- Type: light bomber
- Manufacturer: Messerschmitt
- Primary user: Luftwaffe
- Number built: 3

History
- First flight: February 1937
- Developed from: Messerschmitt Bf 110

The Messerschmitt Bf 162 was a light bomber aircraft designed in Germany prior to World War II, which flew only in prototype form.

== Design and development ==
The Bf 162 was designed in response to a 1935 RLM (Reichsluftfahrtministerium, Reich Aviation Ministry) specification for a schnellbomber ("fast bomber") for tactical use. Messerschmitt's design was a modified Bf 110 with a glazed nose to accommodate a bombardier. In 1937, three prototypes were flown against rival designs, the Junkers Ju 88 and the Henschel Hs 127, both entirely new aircraft.

It was eventually decided that the Ju 88 be selected for production, and development of the Bf 162 ended. As a disinformation tactic, images of the Bf 162 were widely circulated in the German press, captioned as the "Messerschmitt Jaguar", a name never used outside this context.

This aircraft's RLM official airframe number of 8-162 was later re-used for the Heinkel He 162 jet fighter.

== Specifications (Bf 162) ==
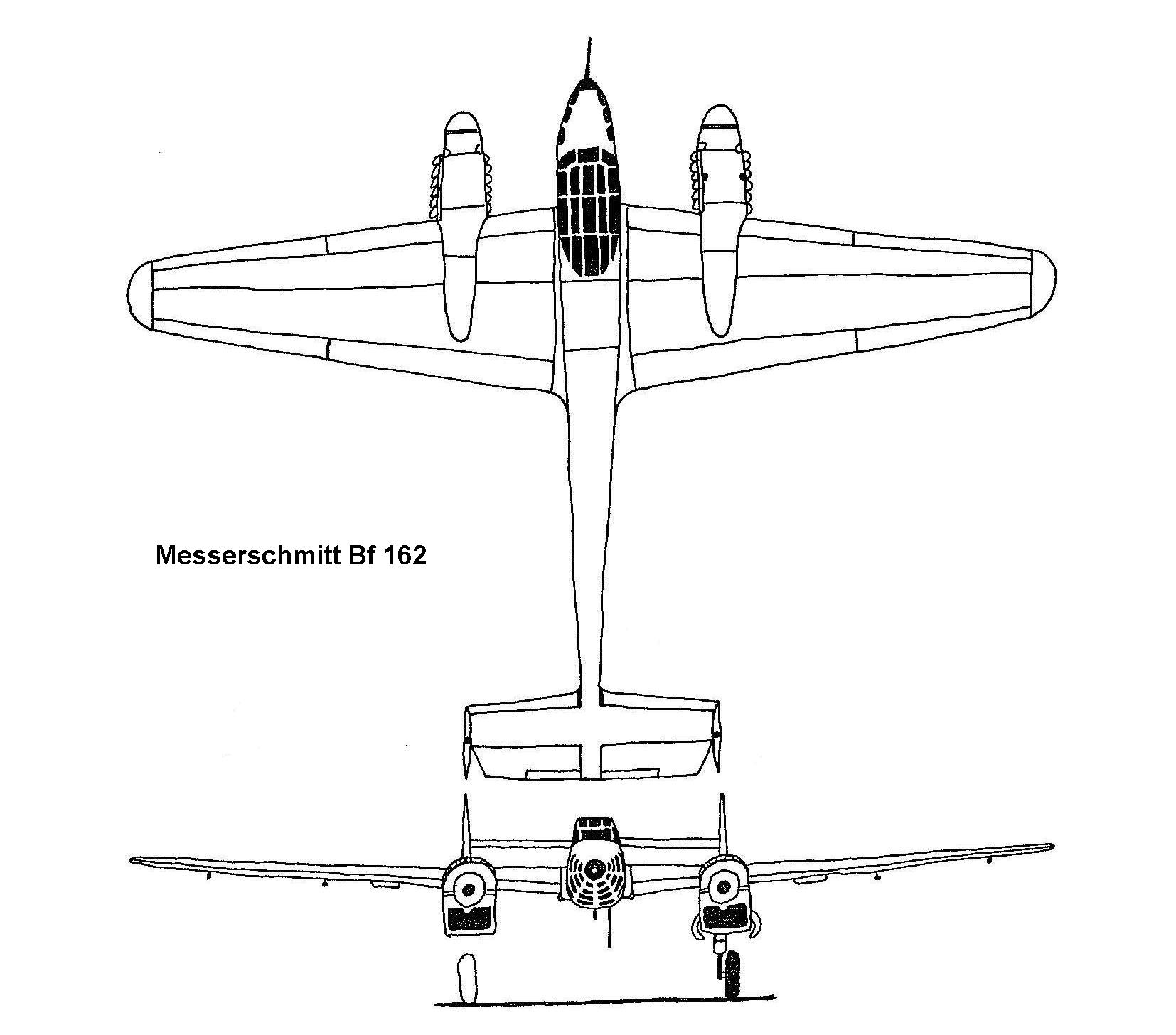
3-view of the Bf 162

Data from Warplanes of the Third Reich

General characteristics

- Crew: 3 (pilot, gunner, and bombardier/navigator)
- Length: 12.75 m (41 ft 10 in)
- Wingspan: 17.16 m (56 ft 4 in)
- Height: 3.58 m (11 ft 9 in)
- Airfoil: root: NACA 2R1 18.5; tip: NACA 2R1 11
- Empty weight: 5,810 kg (12,809 lb)
- Powerplant: 2 × Daimler-Benz DB 600Aa V-12 inverted liquid-cooled piston engines, 736 kW (987 hp) each
- Propellers: 3-bladed variable-pitch propellers

Performance

- Maximum speed: 480 km/h (300 mph, 260 kn) at 3,400 m (11,200 ft)
- Cruise speed: 425 km/h (264 mph, 229 kn) at 3,400 m (11,200 ft)
- Range: 782 km (486 mi, 422 nmi)
- Rate of climb: 9 m/s (1,800 ft/min)

Armament

- Guns: 1× 7.92 mm MG 15 machine gun in dorsal position
- Bombs: 10× 50 kg (110 lb) bombs internally and 2× 250 kg (550 lb) bombs externally (overload)

== See also ==
Related development

- Messerschmitt Bf 110
- Messerschmitt Bf 161

== Bibliography ==
- Green, William. Warplanes of the Third Reich. Doubleday, 1972. ISBN 0-385-05782-2.
- Wagner, Ray and Heinz Nowarra. German Combat Planes: A Comprehensive Survey and History of the Development of German Military Aircraft from 1914 to 1945. Doubleday, 1971.
