= Daimler-Benz DB 600 =

1930s German piston aircraft engine

DB 600
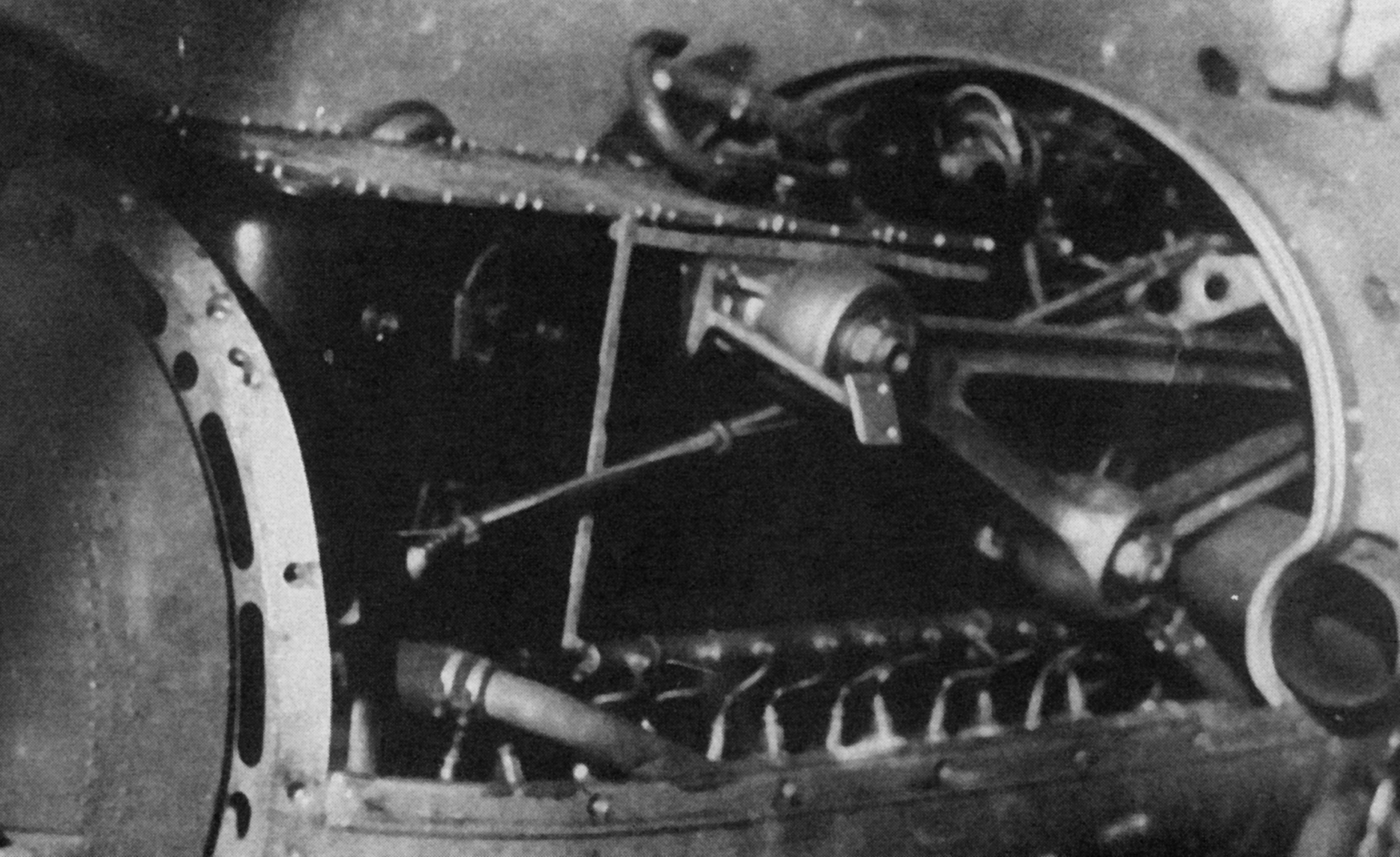
- DB 600A in a Heinkel He 111B nacelle
- Type: Piston V12 aircraft engine
- National origin: Germany
- Manufacturer: Daimler-Benz
- First run: Prototype F4A: 1932 first flight: December 1935
- Major applications: Heinkel He 111
- Number built: 2281
- Developed into: Daimler-Benz DB 601

The Daimler-Benz DB 600 was a German aircraft engine designed and built before World War II as part of a new generation of German engines. It was a liquid-cooled inverted V12 engine, and powered the Messerschmitt Bf 110 and Heinkel He 111 among others.

== Development ==
Most newer DB engine designs used in WW2 were based on this engine. The RLM made a set of specifications listing what was required of a new class of German aero-engines. Among these was fuel injection systems rather than normal-aspiration (carburetion). Knowing that this would take some years to implement, the RLM permitted that the manufacturers could first design and produce the basic engine, and later develop it to include the injection system. The DB 600 formed this function (having in turn been developed from the Daimler-Benz F4A and F4B V12s), therefore when the injection system was ready it meant that the DB 600 was replaced by the otherwise similar DB 601, which in addition to direct fuel injection, also added the variable speed supercharger. Later DB series engines grew in bore, stroke, and horsepower, including the DB 603 and DB 605, but were generally similar to the pattern created with the DB 600.

== Variants ==
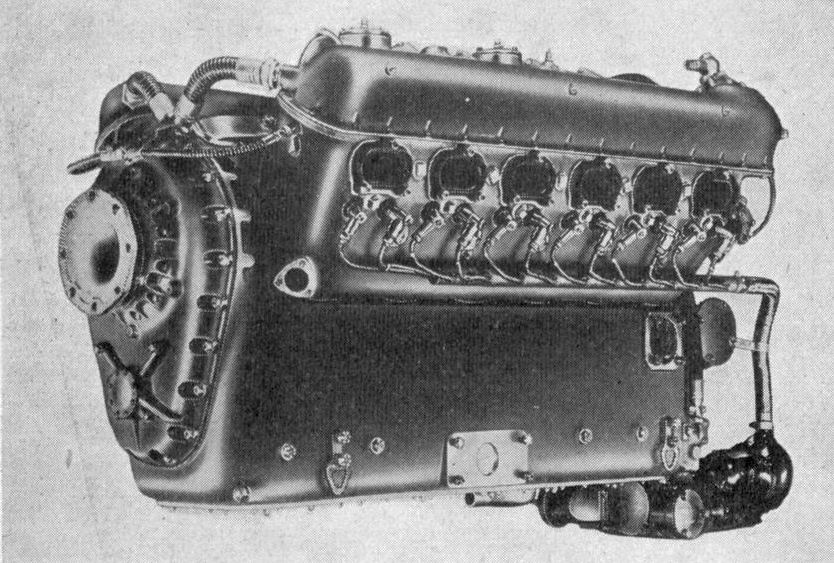
Daimler Benz DB-600 photo from L'Aerophile March 1939, shown upside-down

DB 600 A/B
1,000 PS (986 hp, 735 kW) at 2,400 rpm at sea level with 5-minute Kurzleistung (short term output)

DB 600Aa

DB 600 C/D
850 PS (838 hp, 625 kW) at 2,250 rpm at sea level with 1-minute Erhöhte Kurzleistung
910 PS (898 hp, 669 kW) at 2,400 rpm at 4,000 m (13,000 ft) with 5-minute Kurzleistung
DB 600 Ga/Ha
1,050 PS (1,036 hp, 772 kW) at 2,400 rpm at sea level with 1-minute Erhöhte Kurzleistung
1,050 PS (1,036 hp, 772 kW) at 2,400 rpm at 3,600 m (11,800 ft) with 5-minute Kurzleistung

Note:

- DB 600 A/C/Ga with a reduction gearing of 1.55
- DB 600 B/D/Ha with a reduction gearing of 1.88

- Luftfahrt-Lehrbücherei, Band 21, Die Deutschen Flugmotoren: DB 600, Berlin, 1940

== Applications ==
- Arado Ar 197 V1. 1937 prototype - naval variant of Arado Ar 68.
- Dornier Do 17 S-0 Three pre-production aircraft.
- Focke-Wulf Fw 57
- Focke-Wulf Fw 187 V6.
- Heinkel He 60C One test aircraft.
- Heinkel He 111 V5: DB 600A, B-1, B-2: DB 600C, G-4: DB 600G, G-5: DB 600C, J-1: DB 600C
- Heinkel He 112 V7, V8.
- Heinkel He 114 Three He 114 B-2 exported to Romania.
- Junkers Ju 90 V1.
- Henschel Hs 128 V1. Twin engine, pressurised cockpit, high-altitude research aircraft.
- Messerschmitt Bf 109 V10 through V14. Prototypes.
- Messerschmitt Bf 110 V1, V2, V3. Prototypes.
- Messerschmitt Bf 162 V1, V2.

== Specifications (DB 600C/D) ==
Data from , Flugzeug-Typenbuch. Handbuch der deutschen Luftfahrt- und Zubehör-Industrie 1944

=== General characteristics ===
- Type: 12-cylinder liquid-cooled supercharged 60° inverted vee aircraft piston engine
- Bore: 150 mm (5.91 in)
- Stroke: 160 mm (6.30 in)
- Displacement: 33.9 L (2,070 cu in)
- Length: 1,720 mm (67.7 in)
- Width: 712 mm (28.0 in)
- Height: 1,000 mm (39.4 in)
- Dry weight: 565 kg (1,246 lb) dry, unequipped

640 kg (1,411 lb) wet, equipped

=== Components ===
- Valvetrain: Two intake and two sodium-cooled exhaust valves per cylinder actuated via a single overhead camshaft per bank
- Supercharger: Gear-driven ( single-stage single-speed centrifugal supercharger
- Fuel system: Four two-barrel carburetors
- Fuel type: 87-octane gasoline
- Oil system: Dry sump with one pressure and two scavenge pumps
- Cooling system: Liquid-cooled, ethylene glycol

=== Performance ===
- Power output:

- 1,050 PS (1,036 hp; 772 kW) at 3,000 rpm for takeoff
- 910 PS (898 hp; 669 kW) at 2,400 rpm (5 minutes) at 4,000 m (13,000 ft)
- 850 PS (838 hp; 625 kW) at 2,300 rpm (30 minutes) at 4,000 m (13,000 ft)
- 780 PS (769 hp; 574 kW) at 2,200 rpm (max. continuous / cruise) at 4,000 m (13,000 ft)

- Specific power: 26.8 PS/L (0.4 hp/cu in; 19.7 kW/L)
- Compression ratio: 6.8:1
- Specific fuel consumption: 0.225 kg/PSh (0.503 lb/(hp⋅h); 0.306 kg/kWh) at max continuous
- Oil consumption: 0.008 kg/PSh (0.018 lb/(hp⋅h); 0.011 kg/kWh) at max continuous
- Power-to-weight ratio: 1.639 PS/kg (0.733 hp/lb; 1.205 kW/kg)
- B.M.E.P.: 9.45 atm (9.58 bar; 138.9 psi)
- Reduction gear Spur

- 600C 0.645:1
- 600D 0.532:1

== See also ==
Related development

- Daimler-Benz DB 600 series
- Daimler-Benz DB 601
- Daimler-Benz DB 603
- Daimler-Benz DB 605

Comparable engines

- Allison V-1710
- Hispano-Suiza 12Y
- Isotta-Fraschini Asso XI
- Junkers Jumo 210
- Junkers Jumo 211
- Klimov M-103
- Klimov M-105
- Mikulin AM-35
- Rolls-Royce Merlin

Related lists

- List of aircraft engines
- List of aircraft engines of Germany during World War II

== Bibliography ==
- Bingham, Victor (1998). Major Piston Aero Engines of World War II. Shrewsbury, UK: Airlife Publishing. ISBN 1-84037-012-2.
- Christopher, John (2013). The Race for Hitler's X-Planes: Britain's 1945 Mission to Capture Secret Luftwaffe Technology. Stroud, UK: History Press. ISBN 978-0-7524-6457-2.
- Gunston, Bill (2006). World Encyclopedia of Aero Engines: From the Pioneers to the Present Day (5th ed.). Stroud, UK: Sutton. ISBN 0-7509-4479-X.
- Green, William. The Augsburg Eagle: A Documentary History - Messerschmitt Bf 109. London: Macdonald and Jane's Publishing Group. 1980. ISBN 0-7106-0005-4
- Smith, J R and Kay, Anthony L. German Aircraft of the Second World War. London: Putman & Company. 1972 ISBN 0-370-00024-2
- Neil Gregor Daimler-Benz in the Third Reich. Yale University Press, 1998
