= Henschel & Son =

German transportation equipment company

Henschel & Son; Henschel Works (Henschel & Sohn, Henschel-Werke)
- Type: Limited company (Aktiengesellschaft)
- Industry: Mechanical engineering, automotive engineering
- Founded: 1810 as Henschel & Son
- Founder: Georg Henschel
- Fate: Merged, later dissolved
- Headquarters: Kassel, Germany

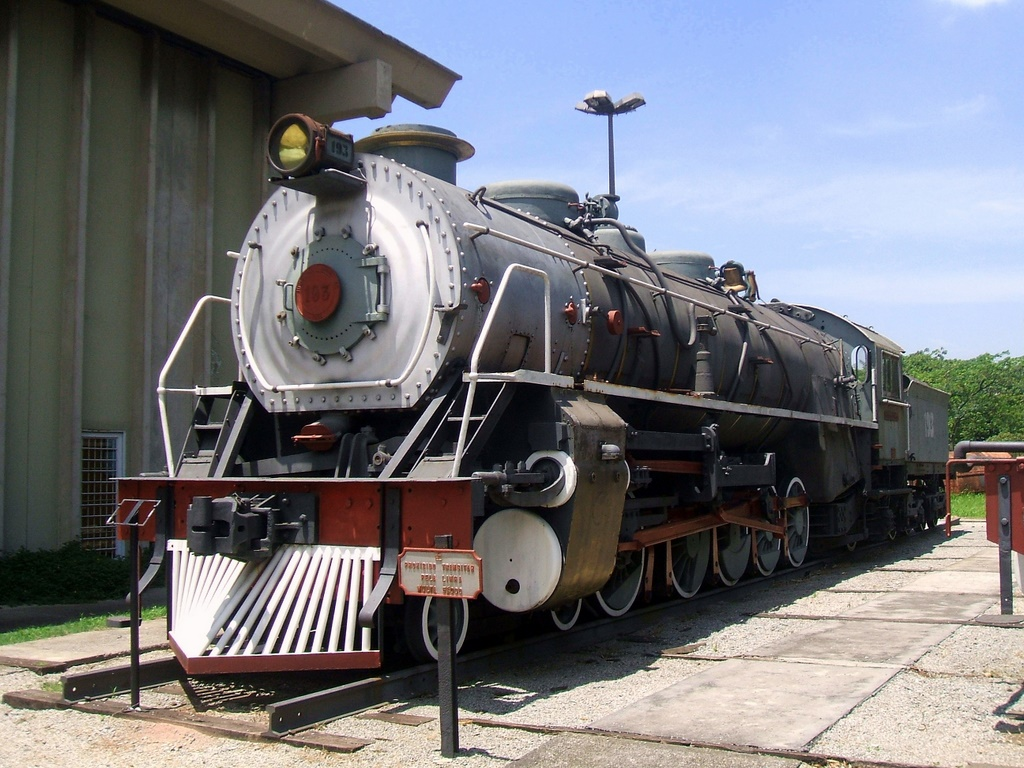
Steam locomotive built by Henschel & Son in 1936, at the São Paulo Technology Museum, in Brazil

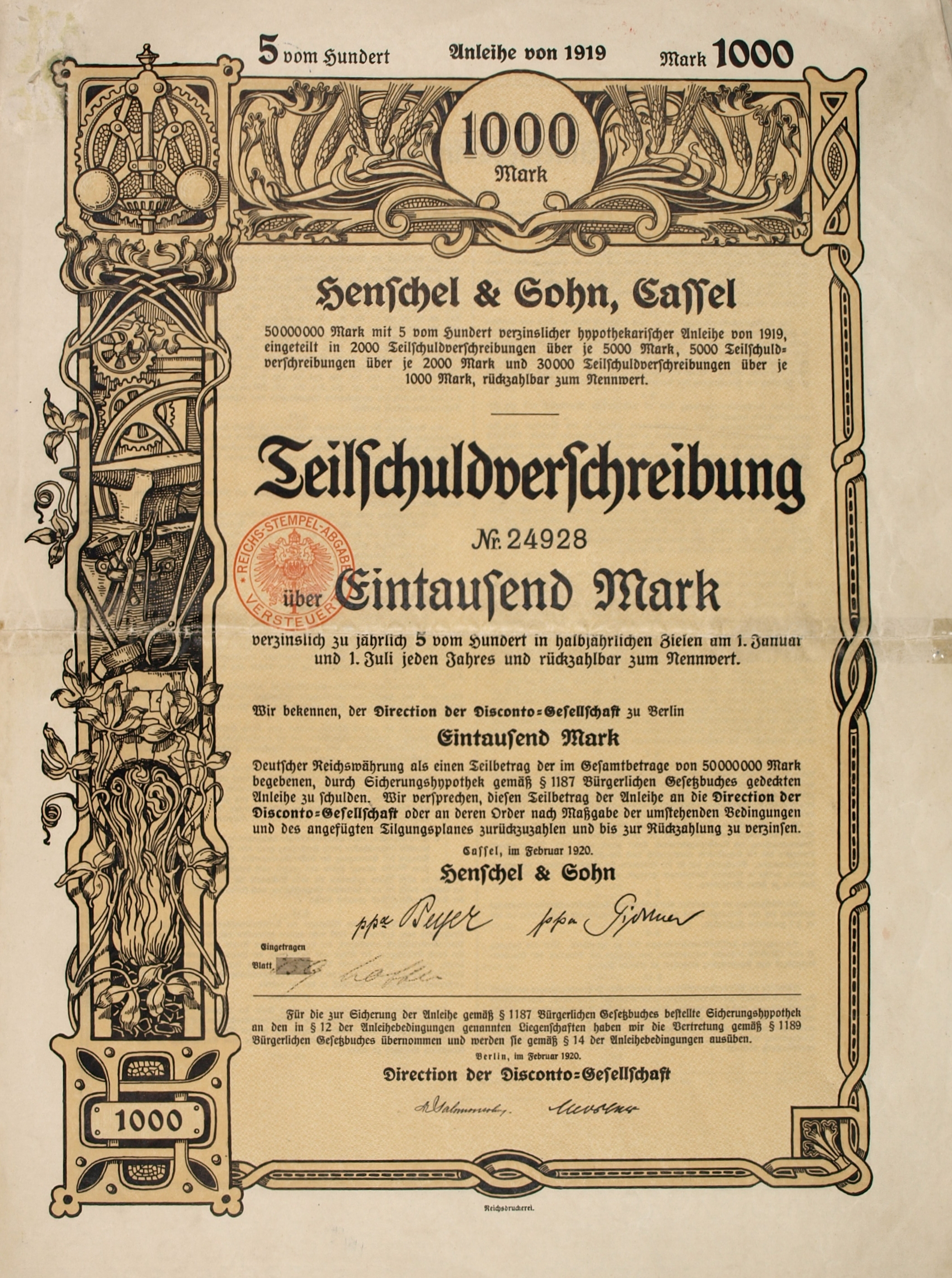
Bond of Henschel & Sohn, issued February 1920

Henschel & Son (German: Henschel und Sohn) was a German company, located in Kassel, best known during the 20th century as a maker of transportation equipment, including locomotives, trucks, buses and trolleybuses, and armoured fighting vehicles and weapons.

Georg Christian Carl Henschel founded the factory in 1810 at Kassel. His son Carl Anton Henschel founded another factory in 1837. In 1848, the company began manufacturing locomotives. The factory became the largest locomotive manufacturer in Germany by the 20th century. Henschel built 10 articulated steam trucks, using Doble steam designs, for Deutsche Reichsbahn railways as delivery trucks. Several cars were built as well, one of which became Hermann Göring's staff car. In 1935 Henschel was able to upgrade its various steam locomotives to a high-speed Streamliner type with a maximum speeds of up to 140 km/h (87 mph) by the addition of a removable shell over the old steam locomotive. In 1918, Henschel began the production of gearboxes at the Kassel plant. In January 1925, Henschel & Son began building trucks and buses.

== Overview of Henschel locomotive deliveries ==
Year	Production	Remark	Image
1848	Number 1	Dragon = Drache (german)	
1849	Number 4	3 locomotives per year	
1850	Number 8	4 locomotives per year	
1860	Number 45	Until March 1860	
1860	Number 50	4 October 1860	
1865	Number 100	19 August 1865	
1868		50 locomotives per year	
1873	Number 500	21 May 1873; 125 locomotives per year	
1883	Number 1000	12 April 1883; 226 locomotives per year	
1886	Number 2000	25 July 1886	
1890	Number 3000	1 February 1890	
1894	Number 4000	18 January 1894	
1899	Number 5000		
1910	Number 10000	15 August 1910	
1928	Number 21000		

== World War II ==
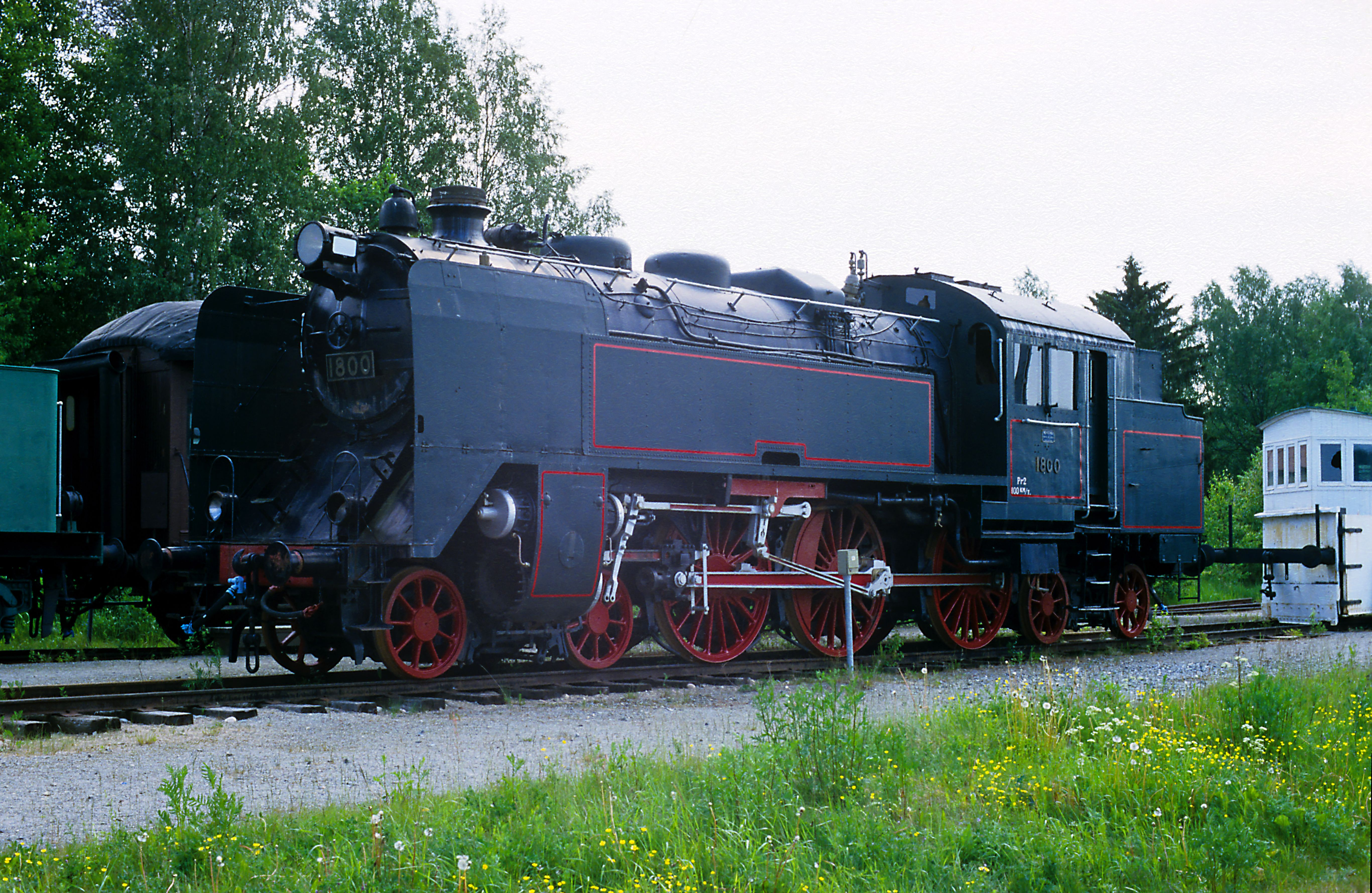
Henschel built (1941) 4-6-4 VR Class Pr2 steam locomotive (no. 1800) at Haapamäki Steam Locomotive Museum in Keuruu, Finland

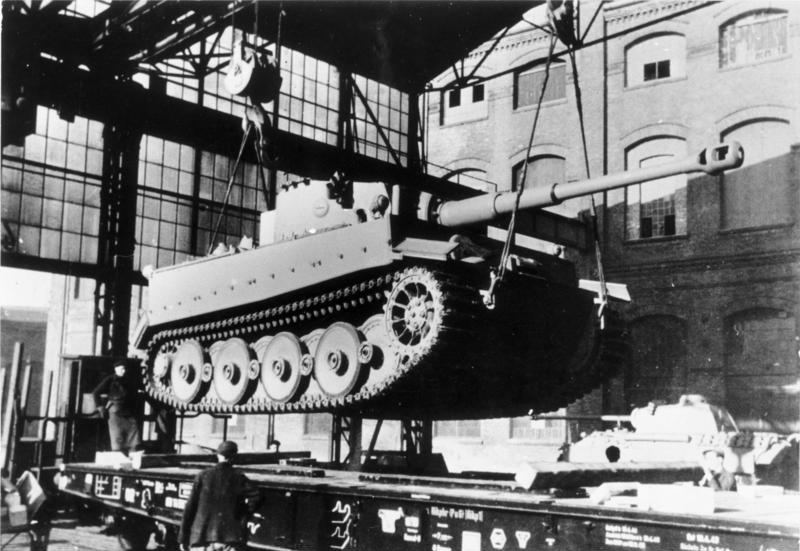
A Tiger I is loaded onto a special rail car at the Henschel plant.

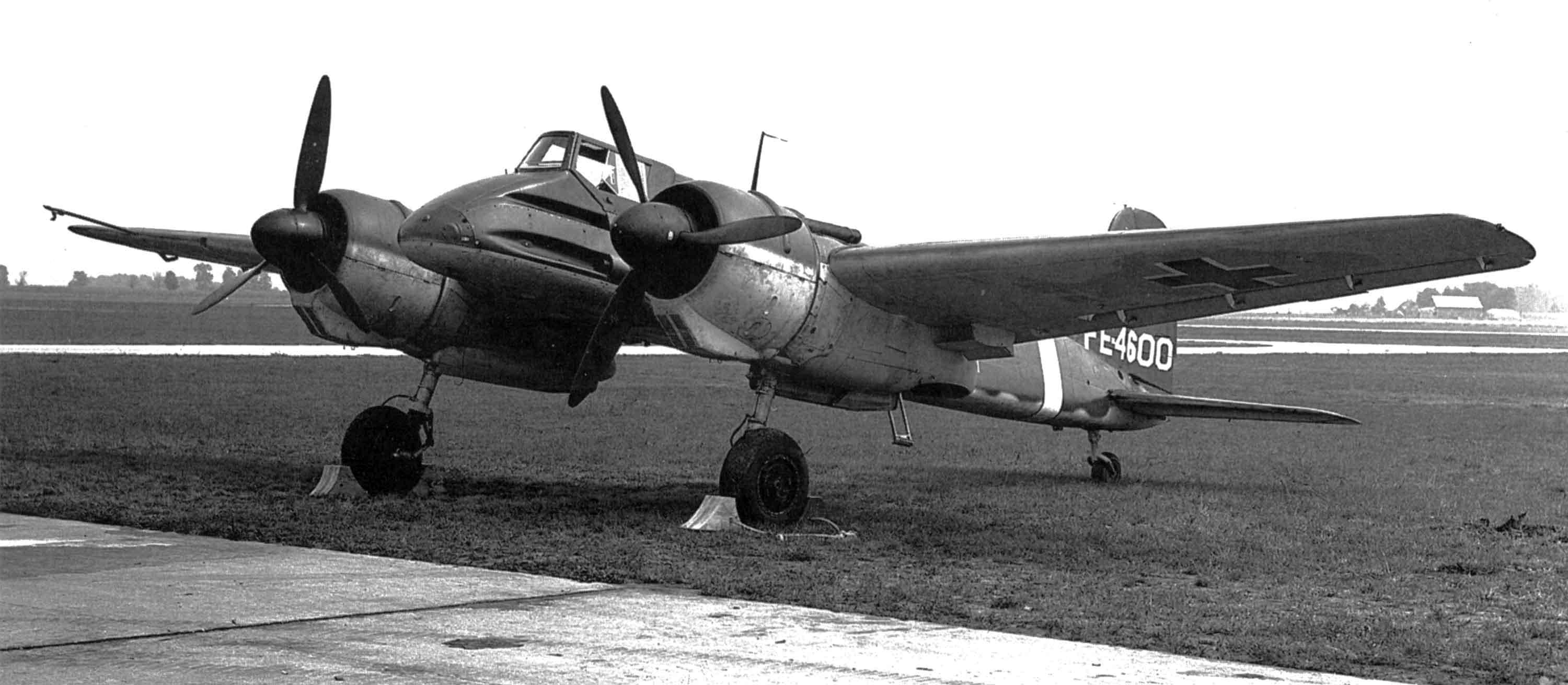
The Henschel Hs 129B ground attack aircraft

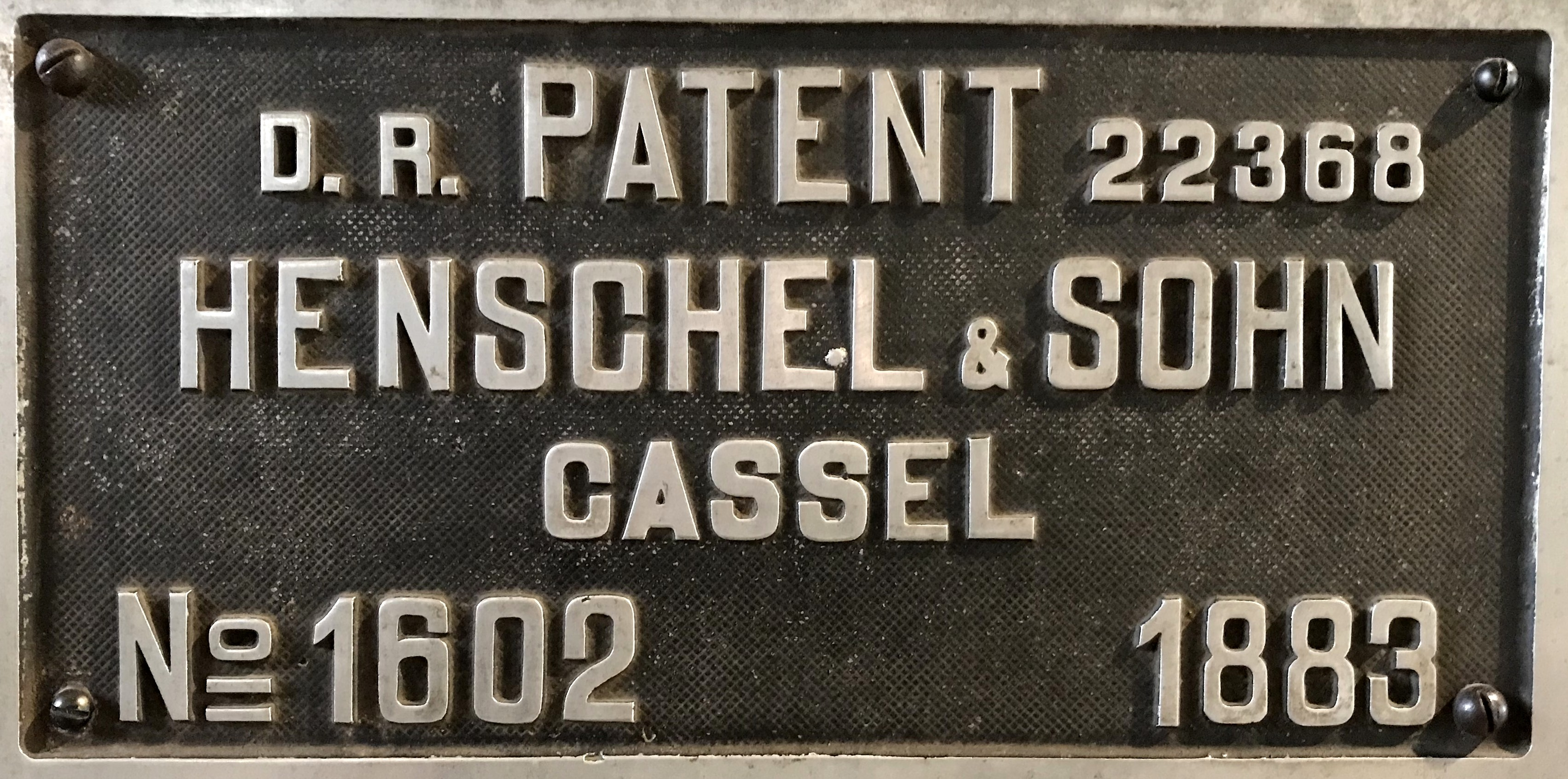
Locomotive nameplate (1883)

Early in 1935, Henschel began manufacturing Panzer I tanks. During World War II, the firm was responsible for license production of the Dornier Do 17Z medium bomber, and in 1939–1940 it began large-scale production of the Panzer III. Henschel was the sole manufacturer of the Tiger I, and alongside Porsche the Tiger II.In 1945, the company had 8,000 workers working in two shifts each of 12 hours, and forced labour was used extensively. The company's factories, which also manufactured narrow-gauge locomotives, were among the most important Allied bomber targets and were nearly completely destroyed.

=== Aviation ===
Henschel Flugzeugwerke aircraft and missiles included:

- Henschel Hs 117 Schmetterling (Butterfly), rocket-engined surface-to-air missile
- Henschel Hs 121, fighter and trainer (prototype)
- Henschel Hs 122, army co-operation/reconnaissance
- Henschel Hs 123, ground-attack (biplane)
- Henschel Hs 124, heavy fighter and bomber (prototype)
- Henschel Hs 125, fighter and trainer (prototype)
- Henschel Hs 126, reconnaissance
- Henschel Hs 127, fast medium bomber (Schnellbomber prototype)
- Henschel Hs 128, high-altitude reconnaissance and bomber (prototypes)
- Henschel Hs 129, ground-attack
- Henschel Hs 130, high altitude reconnaissance and bomber (prototypes)
- Henschel Hs 132, jet-engined dive bomber (prototype)
- Henschel Hs 135, delta wing
- Henschel Hs 293, rocket-boosted glide bomb
- Henschel Hs 294, rocket-powered anti-shipping glide bomb
- Henschel Hs 295
- Henschel Hs 296
- Henschel Hs 297 Föhn, 73mm anti-aircraft rocket-launcher
- Henschel Hs 298, rocket-powered air-to-air missile
- Henschel Projekt P.75, a 1941 design with slightly swept-back wings placed at the rear, swept-back canards at the front, and double pusher propellers at the rear.
- Henschel Projekt P.87, a Schnellbomber design similar to the Hs P.75, except that the canards in the front are straight and the wing is curved.
- Henschel 'Zitterrochen' (Torpedofish), air-to-surface missile (pre-production only)

== Trolleybuses ==
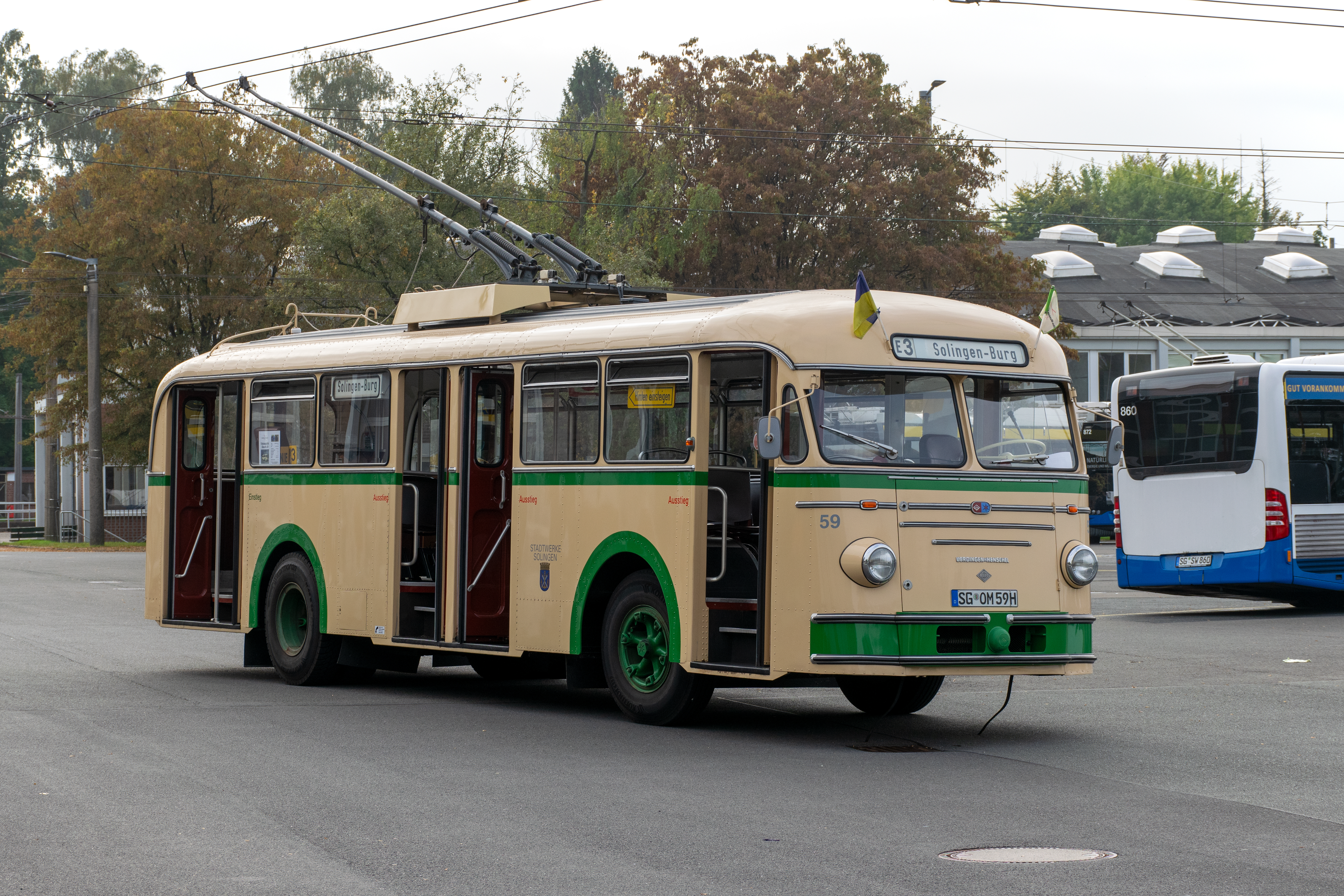
A preserved Henschel trolleybus in Solingen (with Henschel nameplate and logo on front)

Manufacturing of trolleybuses began in 1941 and continued until 1962, ultimately totalling at least 680 vehicles, while Henschel also constructed the chassis for more than 240 others that used bodies by Waggonfabrik Uerdingen (which changed its name to Duewag many years later), of type ÜHIIIs and ÜHIIs. Almost all were purchased by transport companies in Germany or Austria, but Henschel's single largest order for trolleybuses was from Buenos Aires, Argentina, for 175 vehicles built in 1952–1953, and the São Paulo trolleybus system purchased 50 Henschel–Uerdingen trolleybuses in 1954. All but 50 of the 175 Buenos Aires vehicles were fitted with bodies made by Nordwestdeutscher Fahrzeugbau.

== Post-war business ==
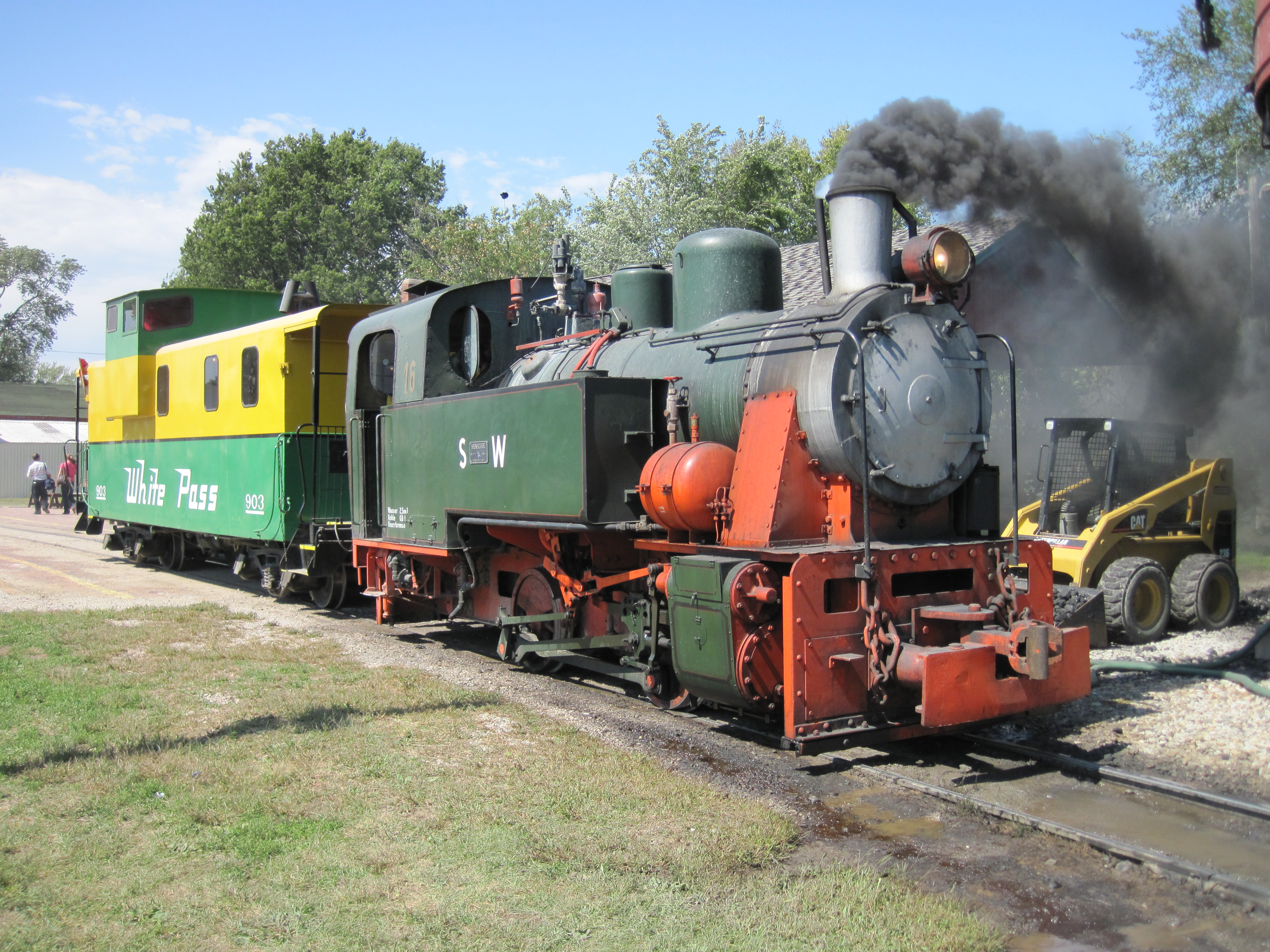
1951 restored pony engine

Manufacturing began again in 1948. In 1964, the company took over Rheinische Stahlwerke and became Rheinstahl Henschel AG (Hanomag). The truck production of Henschel was merged with that of Hanomag that spun off to form Hanomag-Henschel in 1969, this later went to Daimler-Benz, which discontinued the brand name Hanomag-Henschel in 1974. The production was switched to commercial vehicle axles, in this area it is the largest factory in Europe. In 1976 Thyssen-Henschel, and 1990 ABB Henschel AG. In 1996, the company became ABB Daimler Benz Transportation Adtranz. The company was subsequently acquired by Bombardier (Canada) around 2002. In 2021 Alstom acquired Bombardier Transportation. The Kassel facility still exists and is one of the world's largest manufacturers of locomotives. Main product built and serviced today in Kassel is the Alstom Traxx.

== Locomotives ==
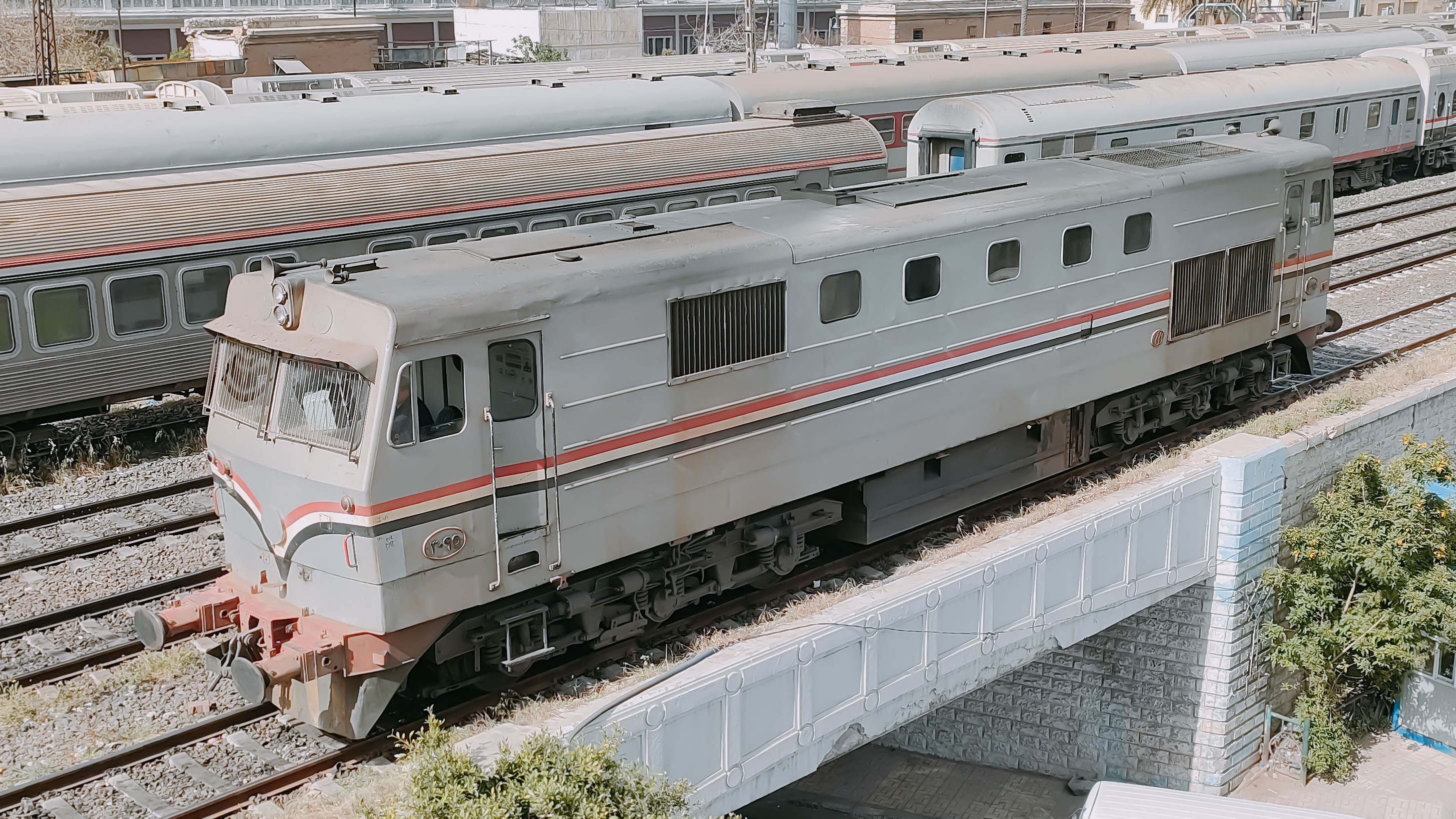
Henschel locomotive on Egyptian National Railways

Private, mining and industry railways

Generation 1

- Henschel DH 110
- Henschel DH 200
- Henschel DH 360
- Henschel DH 550

Generation 2

- Henschel DH 240
- Henschel DH 360
- Henschel DH 390
- Henschel DH 440
- Henschel DH 630
- Henschel DH 875
- Henschel DHG 630
- Henschel DH 500
- Henschel DH 500

Generation 3

- Henschel DH 120 B
- Henschel DH 180 B
- Henschel DH 240 B
- Henschel DH 360 B
- Henschel DH 500 B
- Henschel DH 120 B
- Henschel DH 120 B
- Henschel DH 120 B
- Henschel DH 120 B
- Henschel DH 360 Ca
- Henschel DH 440 Ca
- Henschel DH 500 Ca
- Henschel DH 600 Ca
- Henschel DH 700 Ci
- Henschel DH 360 D
- Henschel DH 700 D
- Henschel DH 850 D

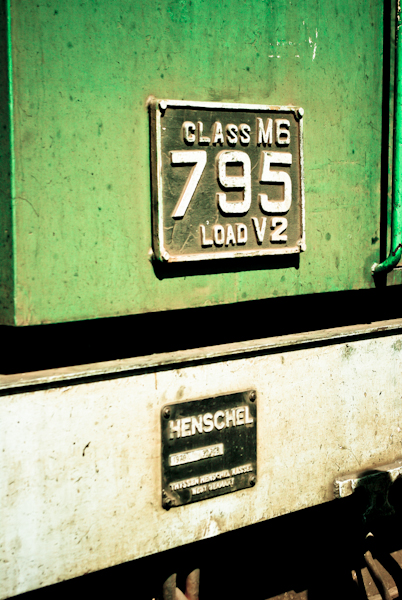
Henschel nameplate on Sri Lanka Railways Class M6 locomotive

Generation 4

- Henschel DHG 500 C
- Henschel DHG 700 C
- Henschel DHG 1000 BB
- Henschel DHG 1200 BB

Generation 5

- Henschel DHG 300 B
- Henschel DHG 700 C
- Henschel DHG 700 C-F
- Henschel DHG 800 BB
- Henschel DHG 1200 BB

Generation 6

- Henschel DHG 300 B
- Henschel DE 500 C

Esslinger

- Henschel DHG 160 B
- Henschel DHG 200 B
- Henschel DHG 240 B
- Henschel DHG 275 B
- Henschel DHG 330 C

Bundesbahn

- Henschel-BBC DE2500

Export

- Henschel DHG 625 C as SJ-Series V 4 und SJ-Series V 5
- Henschel DH 600 C for Export to Ghana and Sudan
- Henschel NY5 for the Chinese Railways
- Henschel NY6 for the Chinese Railways
- Henschel NY7 for the Chinese Railways
- Henschel DHG 2500 BB for Indian Railways as WDM-3 - 8 built 1970
- Henschel DHG 900 BB for the Indonesian Railways as BB302 01–BB302 06 (built 1970).
- Henschel DHG 1000 BB for the Indonesian Railways as BB303 01–BB303 57 (built 1973, 1975, 1976, 1978, 1980 and 1984).
- Henschel DHG 800 BB for the Indonesian Railways as BB306 01–BB306 22 (built 1984 to 1986).
- Henschel AA221 for ENR (built 1978 to 1988).
- DSB Class ME for The Danish State Railways from 1981 to 1985.
- DSB Class EA for The Danish State Railways (The First Two units in 1984)
- Série 070 a 097 for the Portuguese Railways
- Série 0181 a 0190 for the Portuguese Railways
- Série 0201 a 0224 for the Portuguese Railways
- Série 281 a 286 for the Portuguese Railways
- Série 291 a 296 for the Portuguese Railways
- Série 351 a 365 for the Portuguese Railways
- Série 501 a 508 for the Portuguese Railways
- Série 551 a 560 for the Portuguese Railways
- Série 801 a 803 for the Portuguese Railways
- Série E1 for the Portuguese Railways
- Série E141 a E144 for the Portuguese Railways
- Série E161 a E170 for the Portuguese Railways
- Série E201 a E216 for the Portuguese Railways

== Notable employees ==
- Chief Designer Erwin Aders
- Dr. Herbert A. Wagner (see Henschel Hs 117, Henschel Hs 293, Henschel Hs 294, Supercavitation, Operation Paperclip)
- Konrad Zuse

== See also ==
- List of RLM aircraft designations
