= Organization of the Luftwaffe (1933–1945) =

Structure of German air force

Luftwaffe
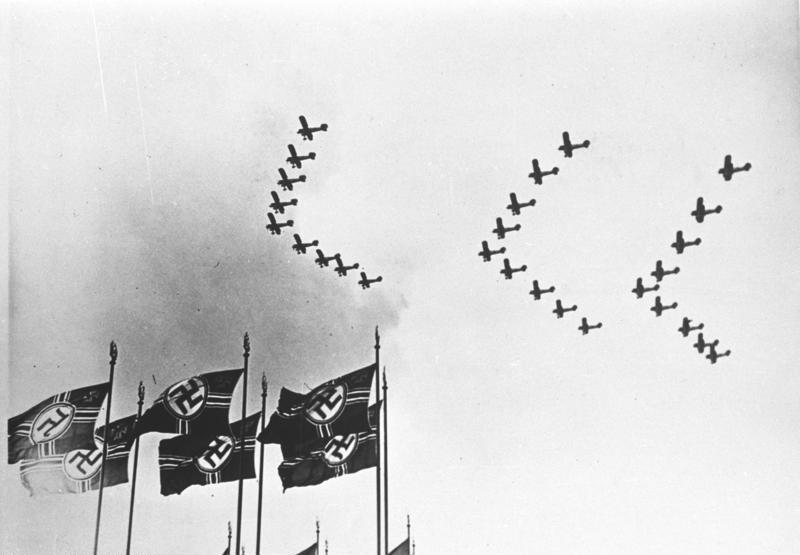
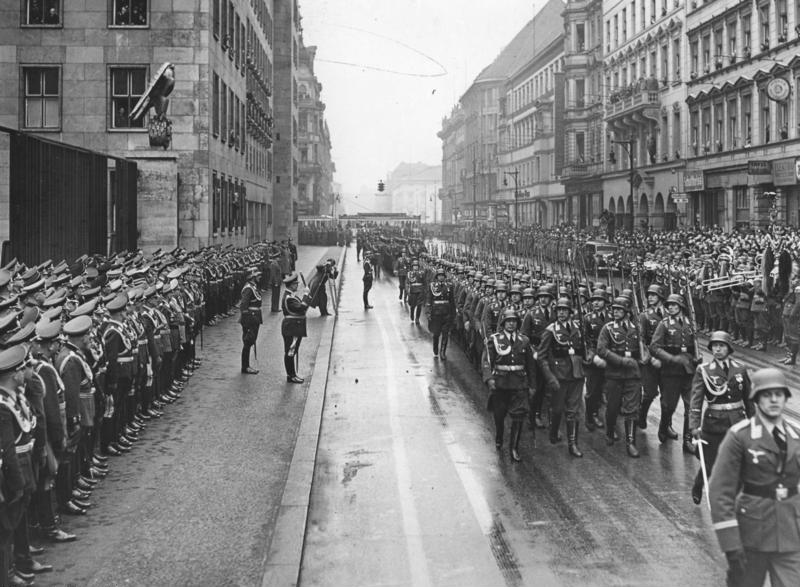
- Luftwaffe formations in 1937 Luftwaffe day parade in front of the Reich Air Ministry, 1 March 1939
- Active: 15 May 1933
- Disbanded: 8 May 1945
- Country: Nazi Germany
- Allegiance: Reichsluftfahrtministerium (RLM)
- Branch: Air Force
- Anniversaries: 25 March 1933
- Engagements: Invasion of Poland, Eastern Front, Battle of Britain, Defence of the Reich, Unternehmen Bodenplatte

Commanders
- Oberbefehlshaber der Luftwaffe: Hermann Göring (1935–1945); Robert Ritter von Greim (1945)

Aircraft flown
- Attack: Messerschmitt Bf 109; Focke-Wulf Fw 190; Henschel Hs 129; Junkers Ju 87; Focke-Wulf Ta 152
- Bomber: Junkers Ju 87; Junkers Ju 88; Heinkel He 111; Heinkel He 177 (strategic bomber); Dornier Do 17; Dornier Do 217
- Fighter: Messerschmitt Bf 109; Messerschmitt Bf 110; Focke-Wulf Fw 190
- Interceptor: Heinkel He 162; Messerschmitt Me 163; Messerschmitt Me 262; Focke-Wulf Ta 152
- Patrol: Focke-Wulf Fw 200; Blohm & Voss Bv 138
- Reconnaissance: Henschel Hs 126; Focke-Wulf Fw 189; Fieseler Fi 156
- Trainer: Arado Ar 96; Bücker Bü 131; Bücker Bü 181; Focke-Wulf Fw 44; Gotha Go 145; Klemm Kl 35
- Transport: Gotha Go 244; Junkers Ju 52; Messerschmitt Me 323

Between 1933 and 1945, the organisation of the Luftwaffe underwent several changes. Originally, the German military high command, for their air warfare forces, decided to use an organisational structure similar to the army and navy, treating the aviation branch as a strategic weapon of war. Later on, during the period of rapid rearmament, the Luftwaffe was organised more in a geographical fashion.

Under the terms of the Treaty of Versailles (1919), Germany was prohibited from having an air force, with the former German Empire's Luftstreitkräfte disbandment in 1920. German pilots were secretly trained for military aviation, first in the Soviet Union during the late 1920s, and then in Germany in the early 1930s. In Germany, the training was done under the guise of the German Air Sports Association (German: Deutscher Luftsportverband (DLV)) at the Central Commercial Pilots School (Zentrale der Verkehrs Fliegerschule (ZVF)).

Following its 15 May 1933 formation in secret, the formation of the German air arm was openly announced in February 1935, with Reichsmarschall Hermann Göring as its Commander-in-Chief (Oberbefehlshaber der Luftwaffe), in blatant defiance of the Versailles Treaty. Initial plans were for long-term growth of the Luftwaffe over a period of five years with the intention of using the Luftwaffe as a strategic force. These plans were changed several times, especially after the June 1936 death of Walter Wever and the succession of Ernst Udet. The focus and role of the Luftwaffe became one of ground support for the German Army during its Lightning War (Blitzkrieg) campaigns. Göring, using his political capital, was able to get significant resources allocated to the Luftwaffe, more so than the army (Heer) or the navy (Kriegsmarine); all three forces existing within the combined Wehrmacht German armed forces of the Reich. This made the Luftwaffe one of the most powerful air forces in Europe during its initial years. Partly due to its ground support role, the Luftwaffe was reorganised in a fashion similar to the army units, with one unit controlling a specific area. Each Luftwaffe unit was self-contained and had complete control over all aspects of Luftwaffe forces in that area.

Before becoming head of the Luftwaffe, Göring was Interior Minister of Prussia. In this position he had formed his own army, starting from a 400 men police department to regiment size. When Göring took over the Luftwaffe, he brought the regiment along with him to the Luftwaffe and created his own ground forces in the form of Luftwaffe Field Divisions and Paratrooper Regiments (Fallschirmjäger) under the Luftwaffe. He eventually included a tank regiment (Fallschirm-Panzer Division), Flak units and a signals regiment (Luftnachrichten Regiment) under the Luftwaffe umbrella.

== Formation and expansion ==
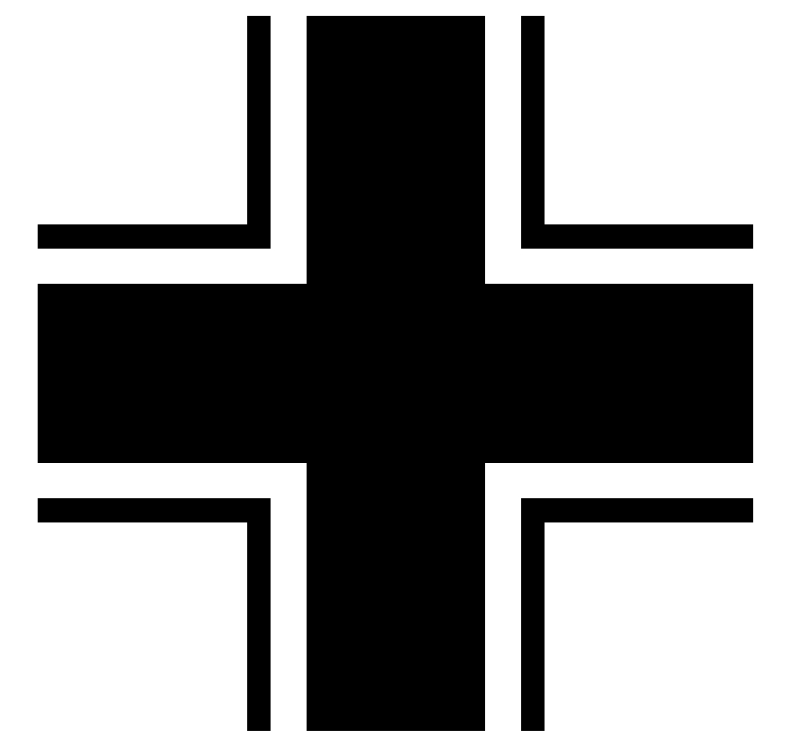
The emblem of WWII German armed forces was the bar cross, (Balkenkreuz) seen in its Luftwaffe upper-wing "narrow-flank" form

Before the 1930s and 1940s, air power had not matured enough to be considered a dominant weapon of war. Unlike the other two forces, air power did not have past experience to draw upon. This resulted in the air force having to learn from experience rather than the classroom. There were no cohesive ideas for the organisation of a structured, modern air force. One train of thought subordinated the air force to the army in support of land operations and to the navy for maritime tasks. It would be staffed by soldiers or sailors trained to fly.

The second theory envisioned a centralised, well organised air force to be used as a weapon of war, like the army and navy. German aviators from World War I, followed this thought process. Since they had the backing of the German political leadership, this is how the Luftwaffe was originally conceived and formed. Following the tradition of putting a soldier in charge of the army and a sailor in charge of the navy, an aviator was designated to lead the Luftwaffe: Reichsmarschall Hermann Göring, also the cabinet minister for aviation. Göring formed a Luftwaffe High Command (Oberkommando der Luftwaffe) for operational management.

Within the German air force leadership, the general opinion was that the Luftwaffe was a tactical rather than a strategic air force. Hence, in order to support the various army groups, the Luftwaffe was organised in similar fashion to the army. Its units had a flexible composition with sub-units being added or removed when necessary. These sub-units tended to be semi-autonomous and highly mobile. This offered the flexibility required to support the ground units.

From the start of the Spanish Civil War, the Luftwaffe was in action continuously without the time for rest or training. Multiple political acts and the consequent need for a show of strength forced the Luftwaffe to be in a perpetual state of readiness. This did not allow time for organisational strategy. Göring complicated the hierarchy by bringing the paratrooper (Fallschirmjäger) and Flak Corps (anti-aircraft units) under his command. Due to his political differences with the army leadership, he raised his own police force as Prussian Minister of the Interior. (Note: Not to be confused with Göring's formation of the Gestapo, the political secret state police force in Prussia.) This later became the Paratroop Tank Corps (Fallschirmjägerpanzerkorps).

By September 1939, the Luftwaffe had a total of 4,000 aircraft and 400,000 personnel. This strength had grown to 1,700,000 by 1941. In total, 571,000 of these were in anti-aircraft units and another 18 percent were in the signals branch. Only 36 percent or 588,000 comprised aircrew, but this also included the aircraft maintenance personnel. When the war ended on 8 May 1945, more than 97,000 air-crew would be reported dead, wounded or missing.

== Organisational levels ==
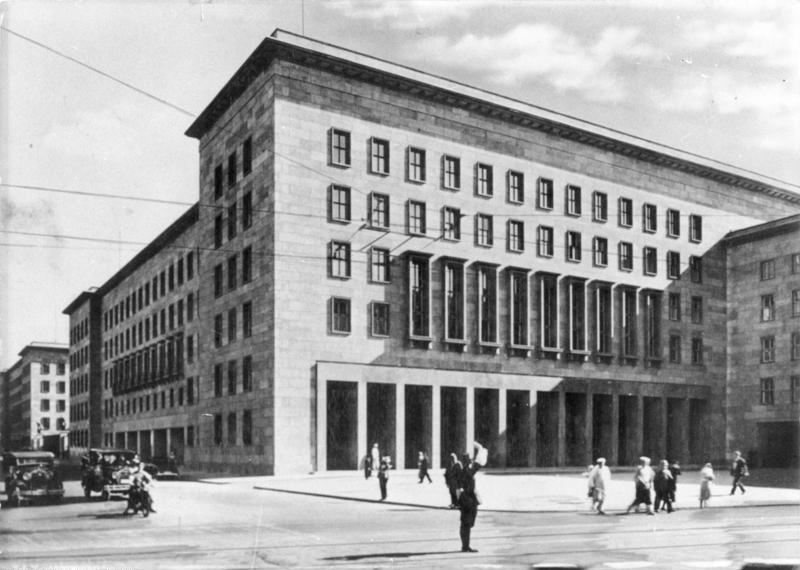
The Reichsluftfahrtministerium, or Reich Air Ministry on Leipziger Strasse in Berlin in 1938

All aspects of aviation including the Luftwaffe, came under the control of the Reichsluftfahrtministerium (RLM), the Reich Air Ministry. Since the Luftwaffe was one of the three armed forces, it came under the Commander in Chief of the Armed Forces from a military command point of view (Oberkommando der Wehrmacht) (OKW).

Göring was the cabinet minister of aviation (Reichsminister der Luftfahrt) during most of this period. He also served as the Commander in Chief of the Luftwaffe (Oberbefehlshaber der Luftwaffe). As a cabinet minister, he was responsible for civil aviation and all aspects of aircraft manufacturing and supply. Operationally, the Luftwaffe command was shared by the Inspector of Combat Flight (General der Kampfflieger) and the Inspector of Fighters (General der Jagdflieger) along with the Secretary of State for Aviation.

The German air force was divided into three operational branches:

- Flying Troops
- Anti-Aircraft Artillery
- Air Signal Troops

These three branches were further divided into sub-branches such as Paratroops, air engineering, air medical corps and air-crew. Since the Luftwaffe was organised in a geographical fashion rather than on a strategic functional basis, it had independent administrative as well as operational command structures. Each geographical area had its own supply and maintenance corps. For this reason, any aviation units moving within that geographical area did not need to carry its own maintenance staff. This allowed for a great deal of mobility within the Luftwaffe.

=== Strategic ===
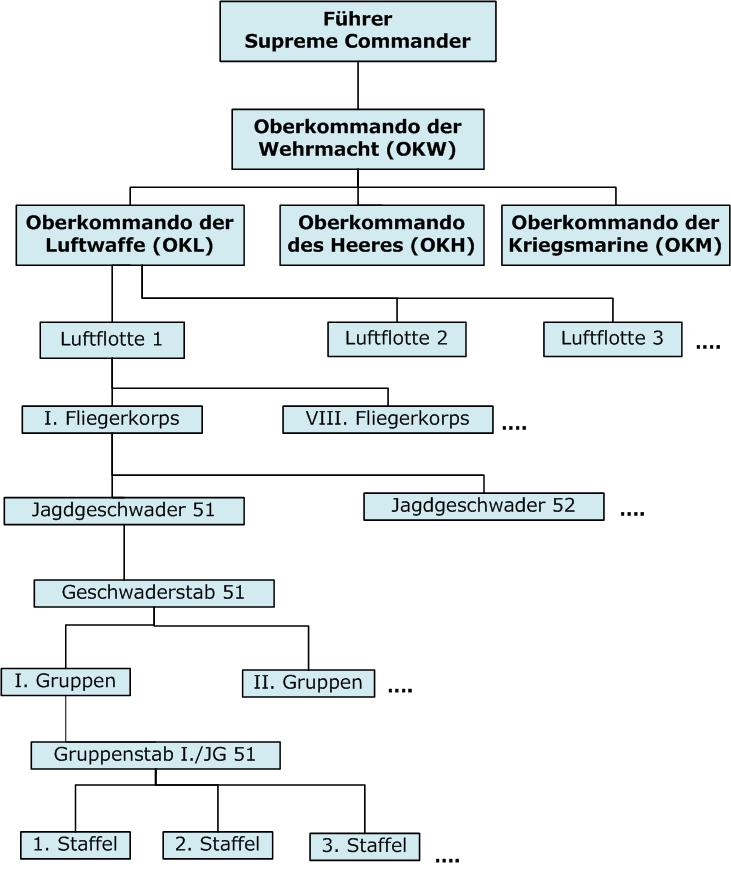
Luftwaffe Organisation Chart during this period.

Strategically, all three German military forces were part of a single service called, "The Defensive Power" (Die Wehrmacht; from wehren (Verb), to defend; and die Macht, the Power, Might) controlled by the Oberkommando der Wehrmacht (OKW); the head of the OKW was part of the Cabinet. Within the OKW, each service was headed by its own operational command:

- Commander in Chief of the Army (Oberbefehlshaber des Heeres in the Oberkommando des Heeres)
- Commander in Chief of the Air Force (Oberbefehlshaber der Luftwaffe in the Oberkommando der Luftwaffe)
- Commander in Chief of the Navy (Oberkommando der Marine)

The top levels of control of the Luftwaffe resided with the RLM, the German Air Ministry and its operational branch, the Oberkommando der Luftwaffe (OKL), or Air Force High Command. These institutions together were responsible for the direction of research, production and overall maintenance of aircraft.

As head of the Luftwaffe, Göring was responsible for the war effort and for the resources sent to a particular region. As a cabinet minister, he was able to get significant resources and personnel allocated to the Luftwaffe compared to other branches of the armed forces. In 1945, close to the end of the war, Robert Ritter von Greim replaced Göring as Commander in Chief.

=== Operational ===
The OKL, as the operational branch of the RLM, had complete control over unit movements, formation and personnel transfers. It had a strength of 25,000 personnel in 1939. On an operational level, the Luftwaffe was divided into air fleets (Luftflotten), not entirely unlike the nearly contemporary United States Army Air Corps and (after late June 1941) USAAF numbered air forces. Each air fleet was responsible for a particular geographic region. They were self-contained units equipped with all types of aircraft and their own supply elements, maintenance staff, administration and legal departments.

At the start of the war the Luftwaffe had four Luftflotten, each responsible for roughly a quarter of Germany. As the war progressed, three more were created as the areas under German rule expanded. Luftflotte 5 was created in 1940 to direct operations in Norway and Denmark. Luftflotte 6 was created on 6 May 1943 from Luftwaffenkommando Ost in Central Russia to direct operations on the central Russian front. The last Luftflotte created was Luftflotte Reich on 5 February 1944 and was to direct operation in Germany.

Each Luftflotte in turn was divided into many air districts (Luftgaue) and air corps (Fliegerkorps). The commander of each Luftflotte was responsible for all fighter as well as support operations within that region. A fighter leader (Jagdführer) (Jafü) was responsible for fighter operations within that region and reported to the commander. The purpose of a Luftgau was to provide administrative and logistical support to each airfield, whereas the Fliegerkorps controlled all operational matters. The Luftgau headquarters command consisted of one Generalmajor and a staff of 50 to 100 officers. Each Fliegerkorps would have a number of smaller units under its command.

=== Tactical ===
Each Geschwader within the Fliegerkorps was roughly the size of an RAF wing or United States Army Air Forces (USAAF) group, with about 90 to 120 aircraft under its command. These numbers varied as sub-units were added or removed. Each Geschwader had a particular task (such as fighter, bomber, or transport duties) and was mostly equipped with aircraft appropriate to that task. Other types of aircraft were also sometimes attached. A Geschwader was commanded by a Geschwaderkommodore, with the rank of either a Major, lieutenant colonel (Oberstleutnant) or colonel (Oberst). The unit also had other staff officers with administrative duties such as the adjutant, technical and operations officers. These were usually (although not always), experienced aircrew still flying on operations. Other specialist staff were navigation, signals and intelligence personnel.

A Gruppe (plural Gruppen) was the basic autonomous unit in the Luftwaffe. It had no exact equivalent in the Allied forces since it was smaller than a USAAF group or an RAF wing, but was also larger than an Allied squadron. In the fighter force, a Gruppe consisted of 40 to 80 aircraft. A Gruppe was usually commanded by a Major or Hauptmann.

Each Staffel (plural Staffeln) usually had nine to 12 aircraft and was commanded by a Hauptmann or Oberleutnant . As such it was slightly smaller than a British, Soviet or US squadron. (The assumption that a Staffel was the exact equivalent of a squadron sometimes caused Western Allied leaders to overestimate German air power.)

Specialised, independent Gruppen or Staffeln sometimes sat below the level of a Fliegerkorps. A Schwarm (plural Schwärme; literally "swarm"), consisted of four to six aircraft within a Staffel. A bomber Schwarm (at full strength, six aircraft) was divided into a Kette ("chain") of three aircraft. As such, a bomber Schwarm was equivalent to a flight in the Western Allied air forces. A Kette was also the term used for a "v" formation.

A fighter Schwarm (four aircraft) was divided into two Rotten (singular: Rotte, "pack") of two aircraft, equivalent to a pair in the English-speaking world. As such a fighter Schwarm was equivalent to a section/element in the Western Allied air forces. The term Rotte was also used for a formation of two aircraft: the smallest tactical unit, consisting of a leader and a wingman. A Stabschwarm ("staff schwarm") was attached to each Geschwader.

== Strategic level: Oberkommando der Luftwaffe ==
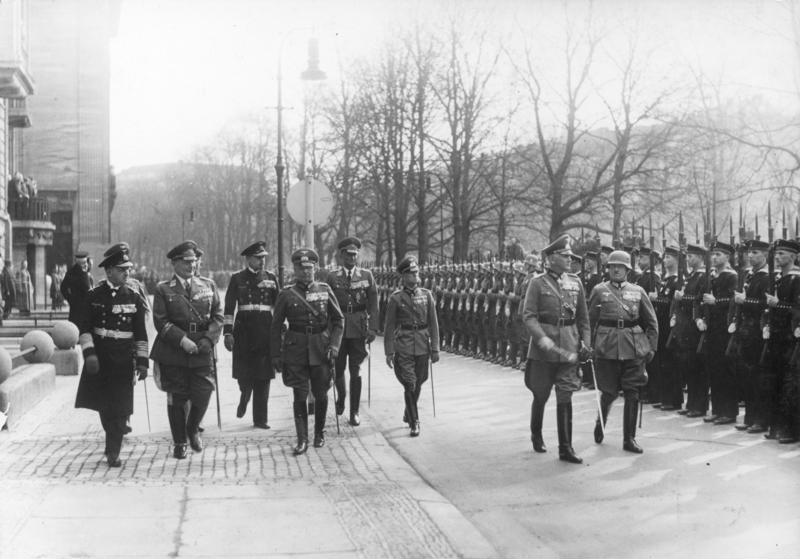
War minister and OKW commander Blomberg followed by the three armed forces chiefs inspecting a parade in honour of Blomberg's birthday in 1937

The OKW was the highest in the military command structure. It was responsible for the co-ordinated effort of the three military arms. It was headed by Wilhelm Keitel after he took over from war minister Werner von Blomberg in 1938. Since the head of the Luftwaffe, Göring, was also a cabinet minister, any Luftwaffe operational orders would come from Hitler to him, who would pass them on to Luftwaffe leaders, bypassing the OKW.

On 5 February 1944, through the efforts of Günther Korten and Karl Koller, the Luftwaffe High Command (Oberkommando der Luftwaffe) (OKL), was formed. Colonel General (Generaloberst) Hans Jeschonnek was appointed Chief of Staff of the OKL. This created a military command out of the all encompassing Reich Air Ministry (RLM), controlling all aspects of aviation. The OKL covered general as well as operational staff of the Luftwaffe. The following parts of the Luftwaffe were under its command:

- The General Staff
- Operational Staff
- Weapons Inspectorates
- Inspector of Fighters (General der Jagdflieger)
- Supply and equipment
- A Signals Division

The other components, such as armament and aircraft manufacturing remained under the control of the RLM.

The OKL was led by the Chief of the General Staff. It was strategically divided into eight directorates (Abteilungen) numbered consecutively. The directorates were:

- Operations Directorate
- Organisation Directorate
- Training Directorate
- Troop Movement Directorate
- Intelligence Directorate
- Equipment and Supply Directorate
- Historical Archives Directorate
- Personnel Management Directorate

There were also 17 Inspectorates (Luftwaffen Inspektion):

- Luftwaffen Inspektion 1 – Reconnaissance
- Luftwaffen Inspektion 2 – Bombers and Dive Bombers (General der Kampfflieger)
- Luftwaffen Inspektion 3 – Fighter, Destroyer, Ground Support and Weaponry (General der Jagdflieger)
- Luftwaffen Inspektion 5 – Air safety and equipment
- Luftwaffen Inspektion 6 – Motor vehicles
- Luftwaffen Inspektion 7 – Signal communications (General der Nachrichtentruppe)
- Luftwaffen Inspektion 8 – Naval aircraft (Disbanded in 1942)
- Luftwaffen Inspektion 9 – Pilot training schools
- Luftwaffen Inspektion 10 – Troop service and training
- Luftwaffen Inspektion 11 – Parachute and air-landing forces
- Luftwaffen Inspektion 12 – Navigation
- Luftwaffen Inspektion 13 – Air Defence (Under the control of the Secretary of State for Aviation)
- Luftwaffen Inspektion 14 – Medical
- Luftwaffen Inspektion 15 – Air Defence zones
- Luftwaffen Inspektion 16 – Air sea rescue services under the umbrella of Sea Rescue Service Seenotdienst.
- Luftwaffen Inspektion 17 – Construction troops and prisoners of war (Under the control of the Secretary of State for Aviation)
- Luftwaffen Inspektion 18 – Luftwaffe field units

== Operational level ==
Six Luftkreise (Air Service Commands) were established on 1 April 1934. These were each the size of an Air Corps and were basic territorial units of the Luftwaffe following its geographical organisation. Their headquarters were as given in the table:

In addition, Luftkreis VII was established on 12 October 1937 with its headquarters at Braunschweig, and is shown incorporated into the above-mentioned table

Luftkreise Headquarters.
Luftkreis	Headquarters
Luftkreis I	Königsberg
Luftkreis II	Berlin
Luftkreis III	Dresden
Luftkreis IV	Münster
Luftkreis V	München
Luftkreis VI (sea)	Kiel
Luftkreis VII	Braunschweig

Each Luftkreis was led by a Höherer Fliegerkommandeur (Senior Air Commander) in charge of all aviation units within its area. These included, two or three Luftgaukommandos (administrative commands), a signals command, a medical battalion and a procurement and supply group. Their area of operations also included civilian airfields and Civil Air Defence. The following year, all the replacement battalions in that area also came under their control. In 1936, these were extended to regiment size or Fliegerersatzregimente. From 1935 to 1936, Flak units in the area also came under their command.

Hermann Göring and Erhard Milch appointed retired army lieutenant generals to lead each Luftkreis. These were Hans Halm, Edmund Wachenfeld and Leonhard Kaupisch. They were promoted to General der Flieger. A retired navy officer, Konrad Zander, was similarly promoted and put in charge of Luftkreis VI supporting the naval units. Two Luftwaffe officers, Colonel Hugo Sperrle and Major General Karl-Friedrich Schweickhard were put in charge of the remaining two Luftkreise without being promoted.

Operationally, the Luftwaffe organisation underwent changes in July 1938. Luftkreise were consolidated into three Luftwaffengruppenkommandos (Airforce Group Commands). As a result, on 1 August 1938, Luftwaffenkommando Ostpreußen (Airforce Command East Prussia) replaced Luftkreis 1. This change also rendered the three digit Geschwader identifiers meaningless. From 1 November 1938, Geschwader identifiers were changed universally. The third digit of the Unit Identifier was replaced with the same digit as its parent Luftwaffengruppenkommando. For example, all units under Luftwaffengruppenkommando 1 (headquartered in Berlin), had the third digit of their identifiers replaced with a '1'. For units under Luftwaffengruppenkommando Ostpreußen, the third digit was replaced with a zero.

By the end of April 1939, another Luftwaffengruppenkommando was added. All four Luftwaffengruppenkommando were renamed Luftflotte (Air Fleets). Geschwader under each Luftflotte, were re-numbered sequentially. Each Luftflotte received a batch of 25. For example, Luftflotte 1 Geschwader were numbered 0–25, Luftflotte 2 Geschwader became 26–50 and so on.

=== Luftgaue ===
Within the Air Ministry, for administration purposes, the Luftwaffe was organised into Luftgaue (Air Districts), based on the army's Wehrkreis ("military districts"). A Luftgau was responsible for all administrative activities, such as training, administration, maintenance, air defence, signals, recruitment and reserve personnel.

The Generalmajor leading the Luftgau-kommando of each Luftgau reported to the Air Ministry.

Those Luftgaue established within Germany were numbered non-consecutively with Roman numerals.

- Luftgau I (Königsberg)
- Luftgau II (Stettin)
- Luftgau III (Berlin)
- Luftgau IV (Dresden)
- Luftgau V (Stuttgart)
- Luftgau VI (Münster)
- Luftgau VII (Munich)
- Luftgau VIII (Breslau)
- Luftgau IX (Weimar)
- Luftgau X (Hamburg)
- Luftgau XI (Hanover)
- Luftgau XII (Giessen/Wiesbaden)
- Luftgau XIII (Nuremberg)
- Luftgau XIV (Koblenz)
- Luftgau XVII (Vienna)(area Ostmark and Protectorate Bohemia and Moravia)

Luftgaue were also established as required in occupied Europe and were named after their location:

- Luftgau Belgien-Nordfrankreich was headquartered in Brussels and responsible for Belgium and northern France.
- Luftgau Charkow
- Luftgau Finnland
- Luftgau Holland
- Luftgau Kiew
- Luftgau Moskau
- Luftgau Norwegen
- Luftgau Ostland
- Luftgau Petersburg
- Luftgau Rostow
- Luftgau Süd
- Luftgau Westfrankreich

Feldluftgaue were established directly behind the actual frontline.

- Feldluftgau XXV
- Feldluftgau XXVI
- Feldluftgau XXVII
- Feldluftgau XXVIII
- Feldluftgau XXIX
- Feldluftgau XXX

Each Luftgau had its own section for the following matters:

- Operations
- Adjutant
- Legal
- Administration
- Signals
- Supply
- Restricted flying areas

These sections were numbered in Arabic numerals followed by a Luftgau designator. For example, section 3 of Luftgau VI would be designated '3/VI'. Flying units used the services of a Luftgau through Flughafenbereichkommandanturen (Airfield Regional Commands). Each Luftgau usually had five such commands. Each regional command was divided into five or more Einsatzhafenkommandanturen (Operational Airfield Commands). The operational commands were located at the airfields where it serviced the flying units.

=== Luftflotte ===
Flag of the Chief of a Luftflotte

Operationally under the OKL, all Luftwaffe units were organised into Luftflotte, which were equivalent to an army group. Their size and number of subordinated units, was flexible and changed depending on need. The Luftflotten were created according to the geographical area. As the Wehrmacht occupied new territories, new Luftflotten were created. Each Luftflotte, had an adjutant or staff officer assisting the commanding officer. Although a Luftflotte could be moved from one area to another by the RLM, the Luftflotte had absolute control over all aspects of aviation in that area, including ground operations. This also included legal, administration, signals and supply work. They were essentially divided into operational or administrative commands. The signal services consisted of three Luft-Nachrichtenregimenter (signals regiments) in a Luftflotte. There was also a Fliegerabwehrkanone (Flak) unit.

Luftflotte and their areas of operation.
Luftflotte	Original Headquarters Location	Area of Operations	Major Campaigns
Luftflotte 1	Berlin	North and East Germany	Invasion of Poland, North Russia
Luftflotte 2	Braunschweig	Northwest Germany	1939–40 Western Front, Battle of Britain, Central Russia, Italy, North Africa, Mediterranean Campaign.
Luftflotte 3 (Note: By the Normandy landings in June 1944, Luftflotte 3 had the units under it scattered all over France. X. Fliegerkorps was transferred from Greece to Angers, France in March 1944. It acquired the assets of Fliegerführer Atlantik.)	München	Southwest Germany	1939 Western Front, Battle of Britain, Invasion of Europe.
Luftflotte 4	Wien	Southeast Germany	Invasion of Poland, Balkans Campaign, South Russia, Hungary and Slovakia.
Luftflotte 5	Hamburg	Norway, Finland and Northern Russia	The Arctic Convoys and Northern Russia.
Luftflotte 6	Smolensk	Central Russia	Invasion of Poland, Bohemia-Moravia, Slovakia and Croatia.
Luftwaffen-Befehlshaber Mitte (Renamed Luftflotte Reich in 1944)	Berlin	Home Air Defence	Occupation of Denmark, East Prussia, Channel Islands, Liberation of Norway, and Hungary.
Luftflotte 10	Berlin	Replacement and training units (from July 1944)	

=== Fliegerkorps and Fliegerdivision ===
A Luftflotte was operationally divided into one or more Fliegerkorps ("Air Corps") of varying size, depending on its area of operations. They were responsible for all operational matters such as deployment, air traffic, ordnance and maintenance. A Fliegerkorps could potentially be loaned out to another Luftflotte depending on the nature of the operation. There were a total of 13 Fliegerkorps.

Similar to the Luftflotte, each Fliegerkorps had its own geographical area of operations. It consisted of several Geschwader along with Reconnaissance Gruppen (Groups). The Geschwader could be either fighter or bomber units. Depending on the nature or purpose of the Fliegerkorps, it would have only bomber or fighter units. Similar to the Luftflotte, a Fliegerkorps also had an adjutant as well as other departments. However, it did depend on the parent Luftflotte for administrative and supply purposes. The Fliegerkorps were numbered consecutively in Roman numerals. During the initial organisation of the Luftwaffe, it was divided into Fliegerdivisionen. However, during later reorganisations, most of these were replaced by the Fliegerkorps. Some remained in operation on the Eastern Front.

A Jagdkorps was a more specialised version of a Fliegerkorps with limited responsibility to fighter command only. A Jagd-Division was subordinated to a Jagdkorps but specialised in fighter operations. Jagd-Divisionen (fighter divisions) were active at one point or other during this period. Together the fighter force of Luftwaffe was also called Jagdwaffe.

The Luftwaffe also had specialist units of varying sizes for testing new aircraft as well as captured Allied machines – these units could be as small as a Staffel, or as large as a Gruppe. The specialism was initially unnumbered and simply called the Lehrdivision (Instruction Division) but in later years several Erprobungskommando units of varying size were created to test specific new aircraft, usually numbered with the RLM aircraft designation system airframe number matching the aircraft they were meant to test. Along with the aircraft test and evaluation, a Lehrdivision was also responsible for testing anti-aircraft defences and air signals equipment. The staff of this division were required to have prior combat experience. The Lehr units in this division were usually made part of operational units, receiving help from them for testing under combat conditions. Unlike the Erprobungskommando units, a Lehrdivision did not undertake the testing of experimental aircraft. As the war went on, some of the units under its command were used for operational purposes.

== Tactical level ==
=== Geschwader ===
In the Luftwaffe the largest mobile and autonomous unit was the Geschwader. A Geschwader was the equivalent of a Wing in the United States Army Air Forces (USAAF). It would be used for different purposes such as bombing, interception (both single and twin engine), ground attack and reconnaissance. A Geschwader would be named, based on its purpose. There were several Geschwader with the same purpose. They would be named with an Arabic numeral following the word. It was also customary to give an additional title to a Geschwader in honour of a distinguished person. For example, Jagdgeschwader 2 was named Jagdgeschwader 2 Richthofen in honour of Manfred von Richthofen.

Each Geschwader was commanded by a Geschwaderkommodore. This person usually had the rank of Oberst (equivalent to colonel), Oberstleutnant (lieutenant colonel) or major. He had a small staff along with an adjutant (Staff Officer) for operational as well as for administrative purposes. There was a Stabschwarm (Command Flight) of four aircraft in two pairs. The 1st Pair (1. Rotte) included the Geschwaderkommodore with the Adjutant IIa (the Geschwader's staff officer in charge of officer personnel affairs) as his wingman. The 2nd Pair (2. Rotte) included the 1. Generalstabsoffizier Ia (the Geschwader's Chief of Operations) with the Major beim Stabe (the "Major at the Staff", commanding the Geschwader's Stabskompanie - the command company and for that reason also designated as StabsKp) as his wingman. On the rare occasions when more aircraft were made available, the Stabsschwarm could have 5 or even 6 fighter aircraft instead of the standard 4 and transport, liaison or rescue aircraft could be attached to it. Typically there were three Gruppen (groups) under each Geschwader and sometimes a fourth or even a fifth gruppe was added to single engine fighter geschwader. On several occasions, day fighter Geschwader or Jagdgeschwader were formed with four Gruppe strength from start. Each Gruppe had its own Stabsschwarm, which mirrored the two pairs of the Geschwader's Stabsschwarm. The only difference was that the command company of the Gruppe was commanded not by a major, but by a captain and his position was designated Hauptmann beim Stabe (Captain at the Staff) correspondingly.

Types of Geschwader and their purpose.
Role	Name	Abbr.	Examples
Fighter	Jagdgeschwader	JG	JG 52, JG 27
Bomber	Kampfgeschwader	KG	KG 4, KG 30
Dive-bomber	Sturzkampfgeschwader	StG	StG 2, StG 77 (to October 1943)
Transport aircraft	Transportgeschwader (1943–45)	TG	TG 1, TG 4
Advanced Training	Lehrgeschwader	LG	LG 1, LG 2
Glider	Luftlandegeschwader	LLG	LLG 1, LLG 2
Night Fighter	Nachtjagdgeschwader	NJG	NJG 3, NJG 11
Ground attack	Schlachtgeschwader	SchlG, October 1943 SG (also StG)	SG 2, SG 1
Fast bomber	Schnellkampfgeschwader	SKG	SKG 10, SKG 210
Heavy fighter	Zerstörergeschwader	ZG	ZG 26, ZG 76

- Jagdgeschwader (JG) – A day fighter Geschwader (literally "hunting Geschwader"), typically equipped with the Messerschmitt Bf 109 or Fw 190 flying in the fighter or fighter-bomber roles.
- Nachtjagdgeschwader (NJG) – A night fighter Geschwader, typically flying radar-equipped heavy fighters such as the Messerschmitt Bf 110 or Ju 88 against Allied bombers.
- Zerstörergeschwader (ZG) – Zerstörer (literally "destroyer", as in naval destroyer). These units were usually equipped with twin-engined heavy fighters such as the Bf 110 or Me 410 Hornisse.
- Schlachtgeschwader (SchlG, since 1943 SG) – Schlacht (German: "strike") These were ground attack or close air support Geschwader, initially equipped with the biplane Hs 123, later with Hs 129, fighter-bomber variants of Bf 109, and ground-attack variants of Fw 190.
- Sturzkampfgeschwader (StG; Stuka Geschwader) – dive bomber Geschwader equipped mainly with Ju 87; on 18 October 1943, most of them were re-designated Schlachtgeschwader (SG).
- Kampfgeschwader (KG) – literally "combat Geschwader", primarily a medium bomber unit, with typical aircraft being the He 111 and the Junkers Ju 88.
- Lehrgeschwader (LG) – a Geschwader created to test new equipment under operational conditions and to evaluate new tactics. Personnel from a unit of this type could fly several types of aircraft.
- Transportgeschwader (TG) – typical aircraft being the Ju 52/3m or the Me 323. The "TG" designation was a result of the reorganisation of the transport branch in 1943. These units were previously designated KG zbV (Kampfgeschwader zur besonderen Verwendung or "combat Geschwader for special purposes").
- Kampfschulgeschwader (KSG) – a Bomber Training School Geschwader.
- Luftlandegeschwader (LLG) – a Glider Geschwader for the Fallschirmjäger or Paratroops.
- Schnellkampfgeschwader (SKG) – fast bomber Geschwader. Two units equipped with single- or twin-engine fighter bombers and used for ground-attack or hit-and-run missions over the United Kingdom. Later absorbed by other units or re-designated as Schlachtgeschwader.

As the war progressed, the various sub-units of each numbered Geschwader operated separately and often on totally different fronts or theatres of war.

=== Gruppe ===
The Gruppe was the basic autonomous unit in the Luftwaffe, in both administration and strategic use. Each Gruppe would have a Stabschwarm (staff schwarm) of three aircraft. The Gruppe would be commanded by a Gruppenkommandeur, that would be a Major or Hauptmann, who would have a small staff including administration, operations, medical and technical officers. A Gruppe usually occupied one airfield. Gruppen from the same Geschwader typically occupied adjacent airfields. Each would have an air signals platoon, mechanical and administrative personnel. There was also a trained fire-fighting crew doubling as police officers and staffed by the SS.

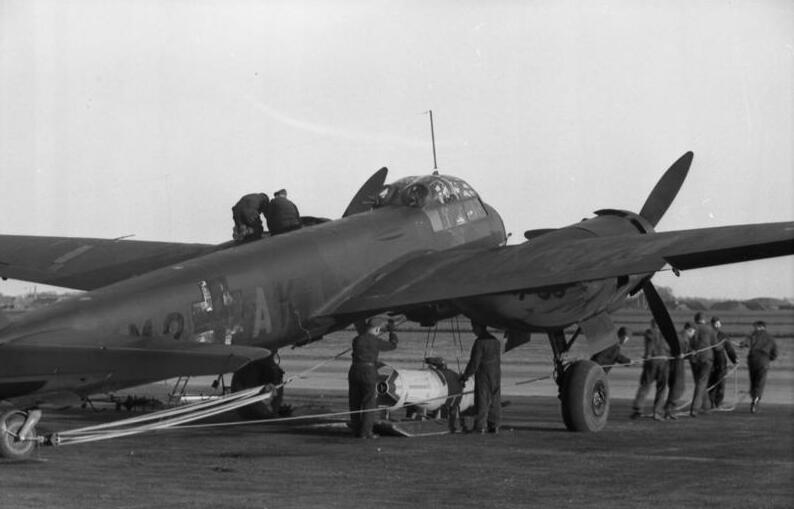
A Junkers Ju 88 A-4 of 2./Küstenfliegergruppe 106, being loaded with bombs, 1942. Note the condition of the Balkenkreuz.

As with the Geschwader, the Gruppe included staff officers tasked with additional administrative duties, usually an adjutant, technical, medical and operations officers. These officers were usually (though not always) experienced aircrew or pilots appointed from the operational cadre within the unit.

Gruppen organised within a combat geschwader were designated with Roman numerals: I, II, III and IV. This would be combined with the abbreviated Geschwader designation – for example, the second Gruppe of Jagdgeschwader 11 would be designated II./JG 11. Each Gruppe in turn consisted of three Staffeln. In total, each Gruppe had 30–40 aircraft including the Gruppenstab. A Gruppe was often transferred from one Geschwader to another. After a transfer they would be re-designated. For example, Gruppe II of Jagdgeschwader 3, II./JG 3 was transferred to Jagdgeschwader 1 as Gruppe I and was re-designated I./JG 1. In the case of bomber Geschwader, an Ergänzungsgruppe (training group) might be attached to a Geschwader as the fifth Gruppe and designated 'V' (Roman numeral 5).

Although all Gruppen in a Geschwader performed the same role, they were not always equipped with the same aircraft. This was more prevalent in fighter Geschwader, but did occur in bomber units as well. Some Gruppen of a fighter Geschwader would be equipped with Messerschmitt Bf 109s, while others would be equipped with Focke-Wulf Fw 190s. Among the bomber Geschwader, some Gruppen would be equipped with Dornier Do 17s while others would have either Heinkel He 111s or Junkers Ju 88s.

There were several types of Gruppen acting in specialised autonomous roles, many centred around either reconnaissance or maritime-involved duties. They were:

==== Aufklärungsgruppen (strategic/tactical reconnaissance) ====
So-named Aufklärungsgruppe reconnaissance units existed in two basic forms for the Luftwaffe in World War II:

- Aufklärungsgruppe (F) – a long range reconnaissance Gruppe. It was later changed to Fernaufklärungsgruppe (FAGr), from Fern, the German word for "far";
- Aufklärungsgruppe (H) were units initially attached to the army (Heer). They provided tactical and photo reconnaissance and were later re-designated Nahaufklärungsgruppe (NAGr), from Nah (near). Typical aircraft were Messerschmitt Bf 109s, Bf 110s and Hs 126s, although a wide range of aircraft types were used, including the STOL-capable Fieseler Fi 156, and the twin-engined Focke-Wulf Fw 189.
- Fernaufklärungsgruppe (FAGr) – The later designation for Aufklärungsgruppe (F) involved with long-range reconnaissance duties.
- Nahaufklarungsgruppe (NAGr) – The later designation for Aufklärungsgruppen (H) or army reconnaissance group.

==== Maritime-duty Gruppen ====
Maritime-involved Gruppe-sized units of the Luftwaffe involved:

- Bordfliegergruppe (BFGr) – (literally "onboard aircraft group"). Arado Ar 196 seaplanes on battleships and cruisers.
- Küstenfliegergruppe (KuFlGr) (German: "coastal aircraft group") a coastal reconnaissance Gruppe. These units fulfilled a similar role to RAF Coastal Command and were usually equipped with floatplanes such as the Heinkel He 115 and flying boats like the Dornier Do 18 as well as land-based bombers such as the Dornier Do 17. These units were also used to attack shipping.
- Minensuchgruppe (MSGr) – (literally "minesearch group"). Junkers Ju 52s, or rarely Bv 138 flying boats fitted with large electromagnetic rings that were designed to sweep oceanic minefields of magnetically triggered sea mines.
- Seeaufklärungsgruppe (SAGr) – a Gruppe for maritime reconnaissance.
- Trägergruppe (TrGr) – (literally "Carrier group"). They consisted of Junkers Ju 87C (Stukas) and Bf 109 T aircraft for the planned German aircraft carrier Graf Zeppelin. It was disbanded in 1940 after the carrier project was scrapped.

==== Rear-area and night attack Gruppen ====
Other types of Gruppe-sized units of various types existed within the Luftwaffe structure as well:

- Ergänzungsgruppe (ERgGr) – SupplementalGruppen that were attached to a Geschwader for replacing lost aircraft and training.
- Erprobungsgruppe (ErpGr) – a specialised Gruppe, much like the similar Erprobungskommando (EKdo) units, for field testing new models and on occasions captured Allied aircraft (most notably with KG 200 and the Zirkus Rosarius units respectively), with the ErpGr and EKdo units using a number matching the RLM airframe number of the aircraft design they were meant to test.
- Nachtschlachtgruppe (NSGr) – a night ground attack group. Predominantly used in anti-personnel and anti-tank roles.

Each Gruppe comprised three or four Staffeln, but by late 1944 a fourth Staffel was usually added to fighter units, making the established strength of the unit approximately 65 to 70 aircraft, although during the war years operational strength tended to fluctuate greatly. Personnel strength varied between 35 and 150 aircrew, and 300 to 500 ground personnel.

During the mid-war years a fourth Gruppe was introduced in many Geschwader, initially as an operational training unit for new aircrew. However, these Gruppen soon became additional front-line units, performing the same tasks as their sister formations, while new Ergänzungseinheiten, or operational training units, were formed and took up their tasks.

=== Staffel ===
A Staffel had a theoretical size of nine (bombers) to 12 (fighters) aircraft. Operationally, a fighter unit was usually nine aircraft and a bomber unit one or two less than the nominal nine.

The commanding officer of a Staffel was known as a Staffelkapitän and had the rank of Hauptmann, Oberleutnant or sometimes Leutnant.

Staffeln were numbered consecutively in Arabic numerals within a Geschwader irrespective of the Gruppe they came under. The Staffel designation would be similar to that of the Gruppe except for the Arabic numerals. For example, Staffel 6 of Jagdgeschwader 27 would be designated 6./JG 27. The Staffeln of Gruppe I would be numbered 1, 2 and 3. Those of Gruppe II would be numbered 4, 5 and 6. This was continued for the rest of the Gruppen. When a Staffel was transferred from one group to another or from one Geschwader to another, it would be re-numbered accordingly. For example, Gruppe II of Jagdgeschwader 3, II./JG 3 was transferred to Jagdgeschwader 1, as Gruppe I and was re-designated I./JG 1., this caused its three Staffeln originally named 4./JG 3, 5./JG 3, 6./JG 3 to be renumbered to 1./JG 1, 2./JG 1 and 3./JG 1.

The Staffel usually had a few vehicles allocated to it, and a mobile Fliegerhorstkompanie (air station company) to carry out minor repairs. These were usually named after and attached to a Geschwader. The number of ground staff varied depending on its type, with about 150 for a fighter unit and 80 in a bomber unit – a smaller number of personnel were required in the bomber units as many of the servicing functions were carried out by attached units provided by the local Luftgau or "Air District".

The service test units often known as Erprobungskommando could also be of Staffel or Gruppe organisational size, as well as existing outside of any such "set" unit size as a Gruppe or Staffel – the Heinkel He 177 was service-tested by a Staffel-sized unit, known as Erprobungsstaffel 177, frequently using the RLM airframe type number for the number of the unit testing the aircraft bearing it.

There were a few types of Staffeln acting in specialised autonomous, or semi-autonomous roles, if integrally attached to a Gruppe or Geschwader for differing duties from the main unit. Some of these were:

- Jagdbomberstaffel (Jabo) – a fighter-bomber Staffel, within a Gruppe. Predominantly refers to a ground attack Staffel. It was made more prominent by Heinz Knoke with air-to-air bombing of Allied bombers.
- Luftbeobachtungstaffel, later Wettererkundungsstaffel (Weku or Wekusta) – a Staffel meant for meteorological findings.
- Zerstörerstaffel, as the northernmost-based of all Luftwaffe day fighter geschwader, JG 5 in northern Norway, had one attached to it as its 13th Staffel.

After the mid 1942 successes of Operation Barbarossa, Soviet VVS nocturnal harassment bomber units such as the Night Witches, used obsolete Polikarpov Po-2 biplanes against the invading Germans. The Luftwaffe began to set up their own nocturnal harassment Staffel-sized forces known as Störkampfstaffeln. Eventually Gruppe-sized Nachtschlachtgruppen were used for the same general purpose as the Soviet units. The Luftwaffe's own harassment aviation units also used similarly obsolete aircraft, but of German design. The Heinkel He 46, Arado Ar 66, Focke-Wulf Fw 56 and even the standard training biplane, the Gotha Go 145, were all deployed in their efforts at attempting to emulate the success of the Soviets.

A few specialised Staffel sized units existed within the Luftwaffe for such specialised tasks as weather observation Wettererkundungsstaffeln, (contracted to Wekusta), specialised weaponry (a so-called Staffel 92 was meant to be equipped with the cannon-armed Ju 88P-series of bomber destroyer fighters) and even outside the actual Luftwaffe, such as aircraft factory-operated defence Staffeln, at least one of which even operated the Me 262 late in the war.

==== Schwarm, Rotte and Kette ====
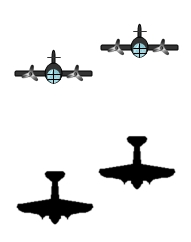
A Rotte.

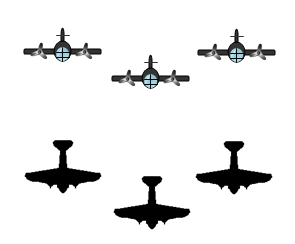
A Kette.

A Staffel was divided into three Schwärme (singular: Schwarm, "swarm"), consisting of four to six aircraft.

Each bomber Schwarm (at full strength, six aircraft) was divided into a Kette ("chain") of three aircraft. As such, a bomber Schwarm was equivalent to a flight in the Western Allied air forces. A Kette was also the term used for a "v" formation.

A fighter Schwarm (four aircraft) was divided into two Rotten (singular: Rotte, "pack") of two aircraft, equivalent to a pair in the English-speaking world. As such a fighter Schwarm was similar in size to a section/element in the Western Allied air forces. (Note: An RAF fighter squadron had four sections of three aircraft) The term Rotte was also used for a formation of two aircraft: the smallest tactical unit, consisting of a leader and a wingman.

=== Air combat tactics ===
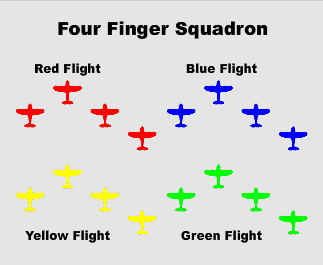
Finger-four formation adopted by the Luftwaffe. Note the colour coded flights.

During the Spanish Civil War, Luftwaffe aces Werner Mölders and Günther Lützow created a new formation strategy for fighter geschwader. It had two aircraft flying in a loose pair called a 'Pack' (Rotte). Two pairs constituted a Schwarm. The four aircraft were flown in what was called the "Finger-four" formation. These aircraft were spread apart so that each pilot was offered maximum visibility. This arrangement was so successful that Soviet pilots in the Spanish Civil War followed the same technique. However, on returning home, they had to revert to the standard "V" formation. Douglas Bader, the British pilot, was the first RAF leader to adopt the "Finger four" formation in 1940. Japan also adopted the "Finger four" in World War II. However, the Finnish Air Force claims to have used "finger-four" already in 1935.

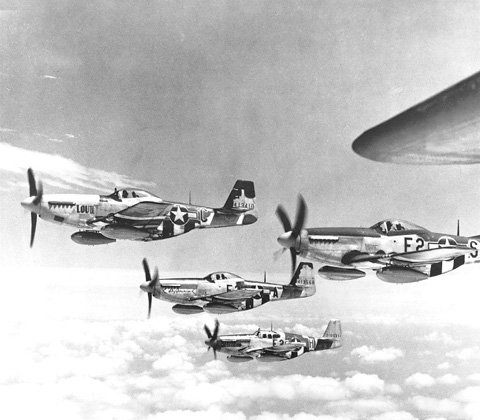
The USAAF adopted the "finger four" formation by the time the Mustang saw squadron service.

In this formation, where each aircraft flew in positions similar to the fingers of an open hand (hence the name), the leader (Rottenführer) was at the front, while on his left wingtip was his partner from the Rotte. The other Rotte was on the right wingtip of the leader, the partner in the second Rotte being on the right wingtip of his partner. The Rotte fighting pair also added to its flexibility, as a Schwarm could easily break into two Rotte pairs without losing its fighting ability. The Rottenführer could attack enemy aircraft, leaving his wingman to watch for the enemy. It was much more flexible than the rigid three-aircraft "Vic" formation the RAF used at the start of the war. In the Schwarm the aircraft had plenty of space to manoevre, so they were free to scan the horizon for enemy aircraft rather than focusing on maintaining a close formation. This flexibility became apparent to the RAF during the Battle of Britain.

== Ground combat forces ==
=== Anti-aircraft units ===
Luftwaffe controlled the bulk of German anti-aircraft artillery (commonly called Flak) since the 1930s. The smallest tactical unit of anti-aircraft artillery was a battery (Batterie). (Note: The Batterie and Abteilung unit organisation followed the German field artillery practice. Normally, the German Army (Heer) anti-aircraft units were called Batterie as well, except the units of anti-aircraft machine guns which were called Kompanie, in the infantry style.) A battery usually had four to six guns. The larger unit was a battalion (Flak-Abteilung), composed of three to five gun batteries and a searchlight battery. Battalions would be "light" (leichte), "mixed" (gemischte), or "heavy" (schwere), referring to the size of guns in their batteries. Flak guns in use were in two light calibres and three heavy calibres – light 20 mm and 37 mm; and the heavy 88 mm, 105 mm, and 128 mm.

The battalions were variously organised into regiments (Flak-Regimenter), brigades (Flak-Brigaden e.g. Flak-Brigade XIX), divisions (Flak-Divisionen, e.g. 9. Flak-Division) and Flak Corps (Flakkorps), although the hierarchy was neither very strict or very stable throughout the history.

Over the course of the war, the continuous attacks by first RAF, then USAAF bombers on German cities led to increases in the number of flak units deployed in Germany. Late in the war, AA units were bolstered by the use of foreigners and German youths. There were a total of 29 flak divisions. Each division generally consisted of five flak regiments, one searchlight regiment, three motorised flak transport battalions, one communications battalion, and supply troops. The number of transport battalions varied depending on location and need of transport of the divisions. The first of these was formed in Berlin on 1 July 1938 as the Air Defence Command (Luftverteidigungskommando) but later renamed as 1st Flak Division.

=== Paratroops ===
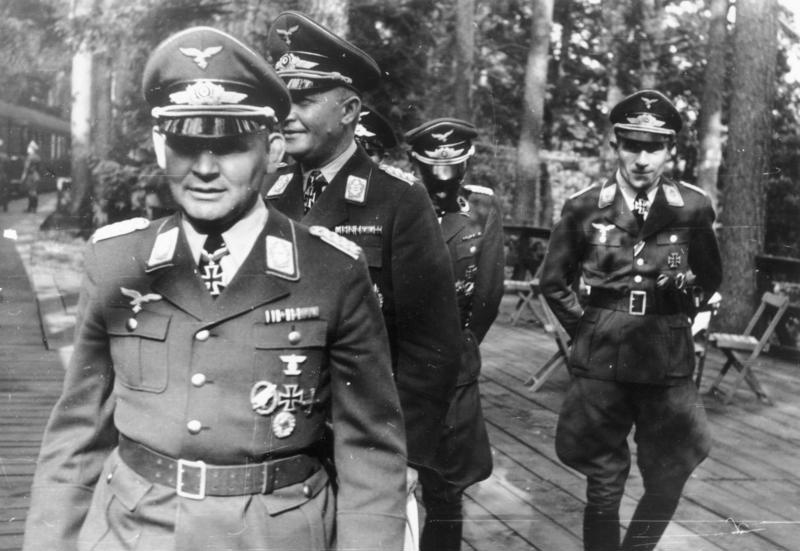
Fallschirmjäger commander Kurt Student with Hermann-Bernhard Ramcke and Hans Kroh in 1941

One of the unique characteristics of the Luftwaffe (as opposed to independent air forces of other nations), was the possession of an organic paratrooper force; the Fallschirmjäger. These were established in 1938. They saw action in their proper role during 1940–1941, most notably in the capture of the Belgian Army fortress at Eben–Emael and the Battle of the Netherlands in May 1940. They also took part in the invasion of Crete in May 1941. More than 4,000 Fallschirmjäger were killed during the Crete operation. Consequently, these forces were only used for smaller-scale operations, such as the successful rescue of Benito Mussolini, the then-deposed dictator of Italy, in 1943. Fallschirmjäger formations were used as standard infantry in all theatres of the war.

=== Armoured Paratroop Division ===
As the Prussian Minister of the Interior, Göring formed an elite police force in early 1933. It consisted of 400 men with its headquarters in Berlin. After several name changes within the following six months, it was named the Landespolizeigruppe General Göring. During the next two years, it grew to become the Regiment General Göring. After the formation of the Luftwaffe was announced, Göring transferred this unit to the German air arm. At that time, it consisted of the following units:

- Regimentstab (Headquarters Staff)
- Musikkorps (Military Band)
- I Jäger-Bataillon
- II Jäger-Bataillon
- 13. Kradschützen-Kompanie
- 15. Pionier-Kompanie
- Reiterzug
- Nachrichtenzug

In late 1937, volunteers for the Paratroop Corps were combined in the I. Jäger–Bataillon. This along with the 15. Pionier-Kompanie formed the IV. Fallschirmschützen-Bataillon. They still remained part of the Regiment Hermann Göring until March 1938. In March they were renamed I./FallschirmJäger-Regiment 1. In late 1939, the regiment had expanded even further and consisted of the following units:

- Regimentstab
- Musikkorps
- Stabsbatterie
- I. (Schwere) Flak-Abteilung (Heavy Anti-Aircraft Artillery Battalion)
- II. (Leichte) Flak-Abteilung (Light Anti-Aircraft Artillery Battalion)
- III.Scheinwerfer-Abteilung (Searchlight Battalion)
- IV.(Leichte) Flak-Abteilung
- Wach-Bataillon
  - Reiterschwadron (Mounted Squadron)
  - 9.Wach-Kompanie
  - 10.Wach-Kompanie
  - 11.Wach-Kompanie
- Reserve Scheinwerfer-Abteilung
- Ersatz-Abteilung
- (Schwere) Eisenbahn Flak-Batterie (Heavy Rail mounted Flak Battery)
- (Leichte) Flak-Batterie (Light Flak Battery)

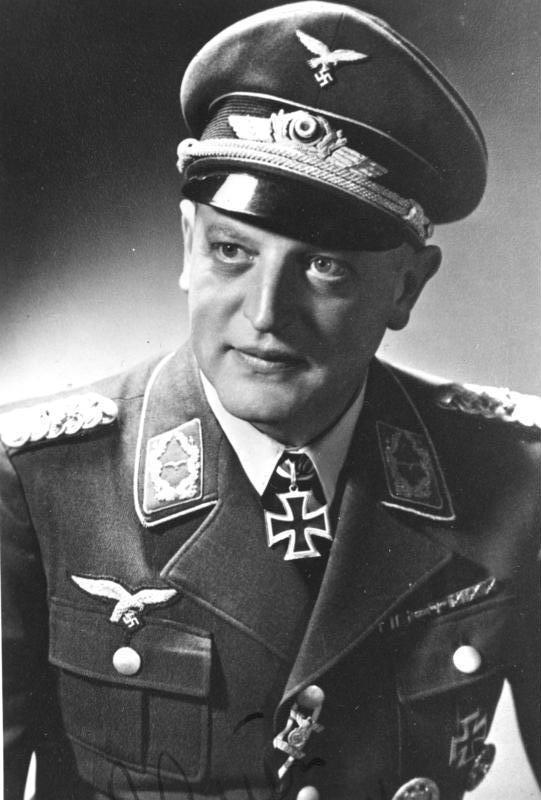
Oskar Bauer, commander of the II. Division of Flak-Regiment 4 in May 1942

On 1 October 1944, the division was expanded to become the FallschirmPanzerkorps Hermann Göring. In order to achieve this, another division called Fallschirm-Panzergrenadier Division 2 Hermann Göring was formed. This was staffed by fresh recruits from both the army and the Luftwaffe.

=== Field Division ===
In early 1942, in the east, the Luftwaffe formed seven Feldregimenter der Luftwaffe ("Luftwaffe Field Regiments"). These were predominantly formed from volunteer or surplus Luftwaffe personnel. Their goal was to maintain airfield security against Soviet Partisan activity. Each regiment consisted of four battalions. Each battalion consisted of three light companies and one heavy company. They also had a headquarters company and one signals platoon. The heavy company operated twelve 20 mm cannon and four 88 mm dual-purpose guns. There was also an anti-tank battalion. It had two companies equipped with nine 5 cm PaK 38 and one company equipped with captured Russian 7.62 cm guns. Due to a lack of training in ground combat skills, these regiments were limited to defensive operations. Although intended to act as a single unit, the divisions were separated and served with army or with Fallschirmjäger units. While in the field, these units were tactically under the command of the army but administratively still under Luftwaffe control. Within the Luftwaffe, they came under the control of XIII. Fliegerkorps.

Administratively, these units came under the control of four Luftwaffe Field Corps numbered I, II, III and IV. Each was commanded by General Der Luftwaffe ("General of the Airforce") Headquarters. The strength of a Luftwaffe Field Division was half that of an army infantry division. It did have a mixed Flak battalion and an artillery battalion. The composition of the artillery battalion varied. The mixed flak battalion (Abteilung) was formed as a part of the Luftwaffe Field Division. It had one heavy battery with three 20 mm cannons and four 88 mm guns along with twenty-seven 20 mm anti-aircraft guns. It had a headquarters staff as well as signals support troops.

The Luftwaffe Field Division had a minimal administrative staff along with logistical support personnel in pioneer, medical and supply companies along with maintenance and other staff. Although the division gave the impression of strength, the reality was that it was barely the size of an army brigade. As of 28 October 1943, the 1st Luftwaffe Field Division reported an effective strength of 6,429 consisting of Officers, NCOs and enlisted men. But the fighting strength was only 2,779.

Although the army was short of manpower, Göring blocked the transfer of surplus Luftwaffe personnel to be trained for the army and instead increased the number of field divisions. Besides the lack of training and combat experience of the Luftwaffe commanders, the army had to supply equipment to these units. Instead of being used on quieter sections of the various fronts to relieve army units for use elsewhere, they were put into action where the Germans were hard pressed and suffered accordingly.

== Identification markings and camouflage schemes ==
=== Identification markings ===
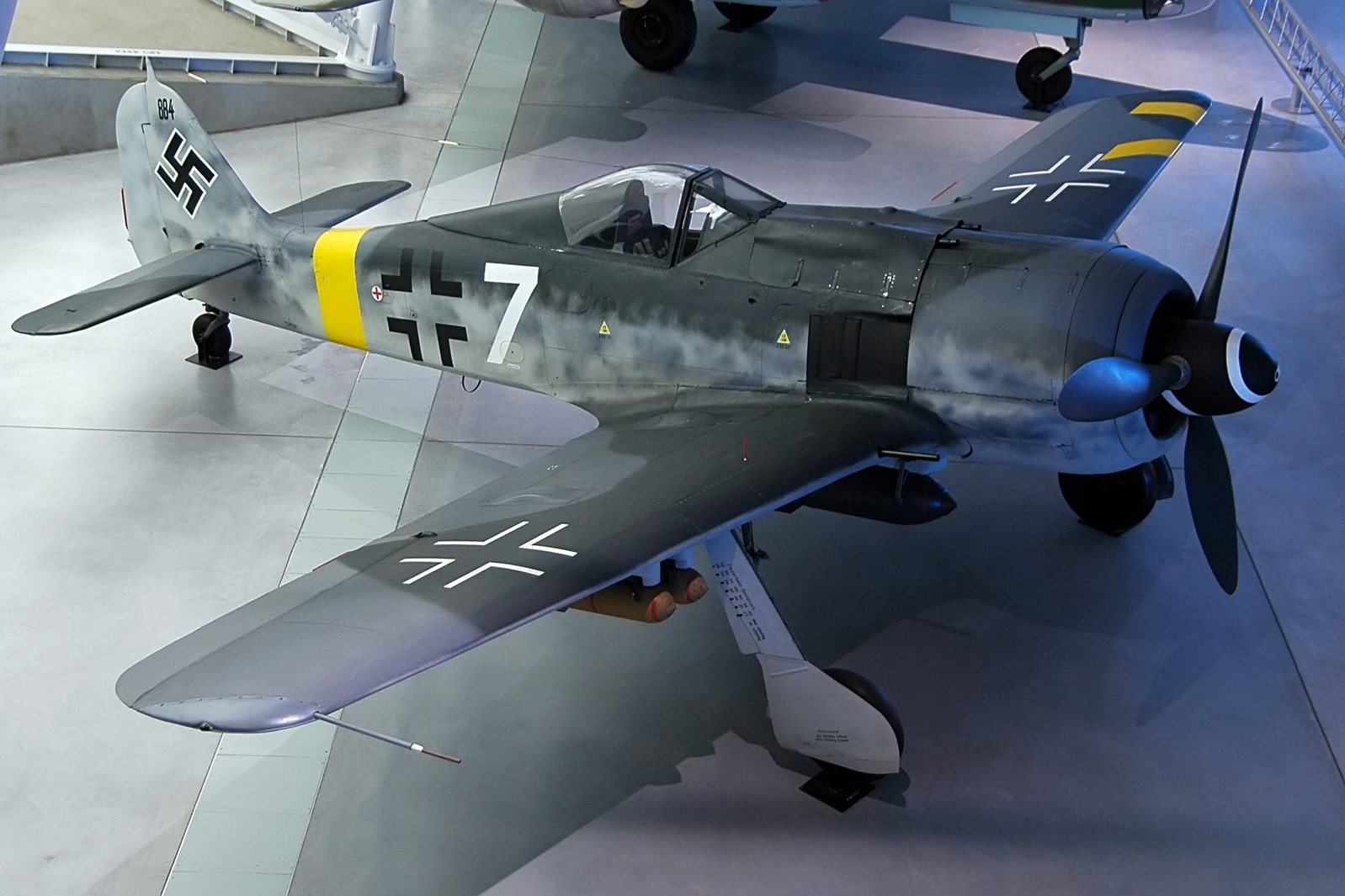
The Smithsonian's faithfully-restored Fw 190F, showing both forms of Balkenkreuz in "low-visibility" flanks-only form

Aircraft markings were used to distinguish friend from foe. There were several changes in identification markings from 1935 until the end of the war in 1945. From 1933 to 1935, civilian aircraft were painted with a bright red horizontal band with a black swastika in a white circle superimposed, shown only on the vertical stabiliser. From 1936, the Balkenkreuz (national cross with four equal arms), basically inherited from the early spring 1918 period of Luftstreitkräfte service when it first appeared in World War I, was applied in black and white, with somewhat different proportions (one-quarter as wide as its length from end-to-end) than the WW I-period insignia, and without the white border outlining the "ends" of the cross, the white borders forming four right-angled "flanks" around the central black core cross. It was painted on the fuselage about halfway between the wing and the tail and on the upper and lower sides of each wing. The flanks came in two regulation dimension formats, with much narrower flanks before July 1939 used in all six positions on an airframe — a wider-flanked variation, for use underneath wings and on the fuselage sides, came into use from July 1939 onwards. This helped in immediate identification.

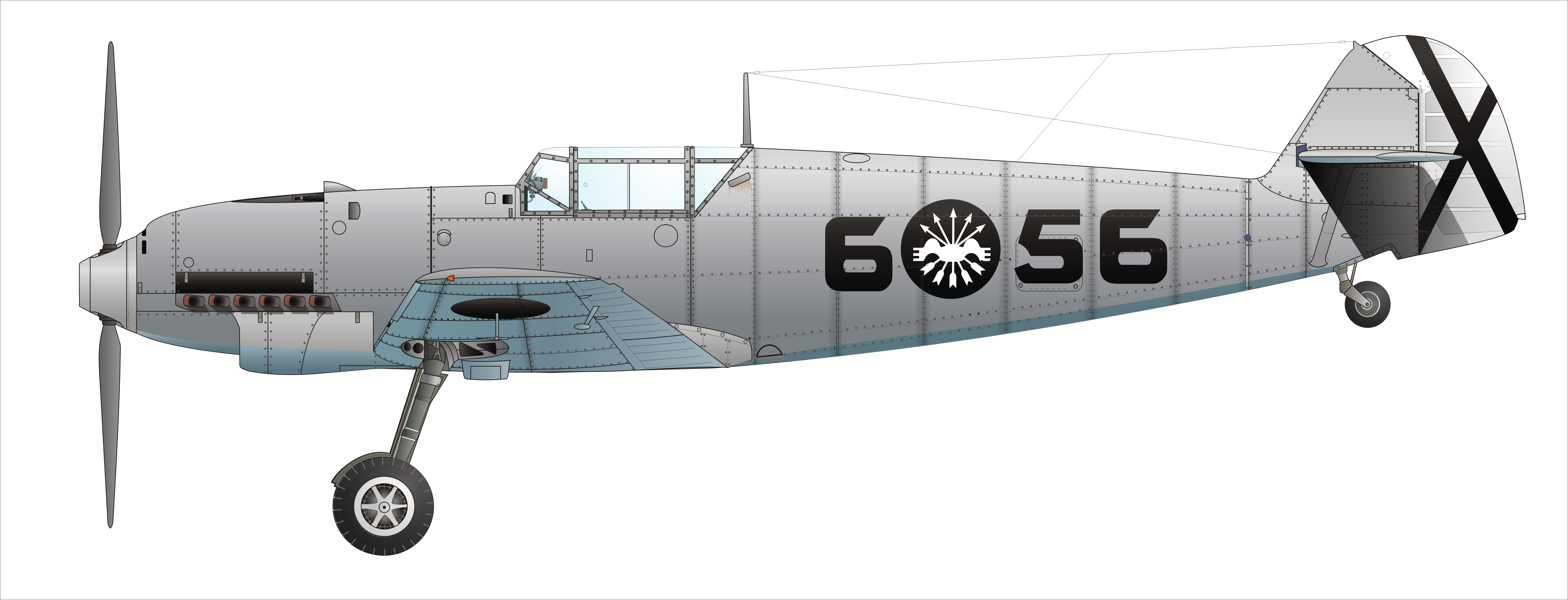
A Bf 109C of the Condor Legion with St Andrew's Crosses on the wings and tail

During the Spanish Civil War, where the Luftwaffe participated through the Condor Legion, aircraft were repainted with a white St Andrew's Cross in a black circle. The tail was all white with St Andrew's Cross on the rudder. In Germany itself, the Balkenkreuz was once again used as the national insignia on the fuselage and wings in six locations, initially with a very narrow set of four white "flanks", which were widened around 1938–39, with the usual swastika on the vertical tail surfaces, usually on the fixed fin, but sometimes instead on the rudder (as done on some Arado-designed aircraft) and on airframe designs that either had a small fin or one braced with struts. Medical aircraft were painted with a red cross on a white circular background. Later on in the war when camouflage was more necessary, the Balkenkreuz had only a white or black outline in a "low-visibility" format, consisting only of the four right-angle "flanks" that had previously bordered the now-absent central black core cross of the Balkenkreuz, with the swastika also frequently being done with a white or black border only, omitting the central black shape.

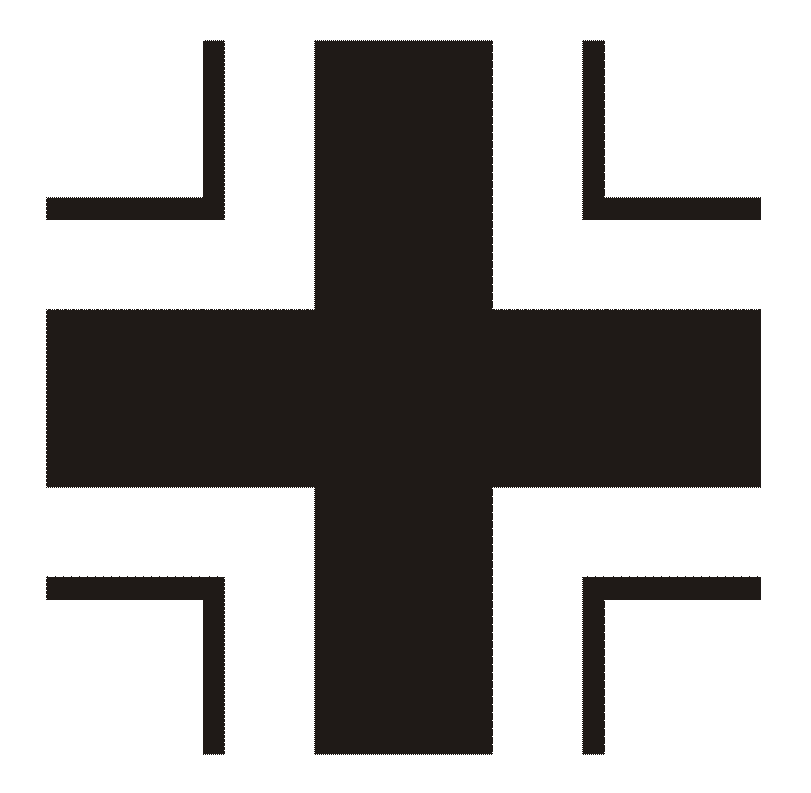
The July 1939-onwards "wide" version of the Balkenkreuz, used under wings and on fuselage sides during WW II

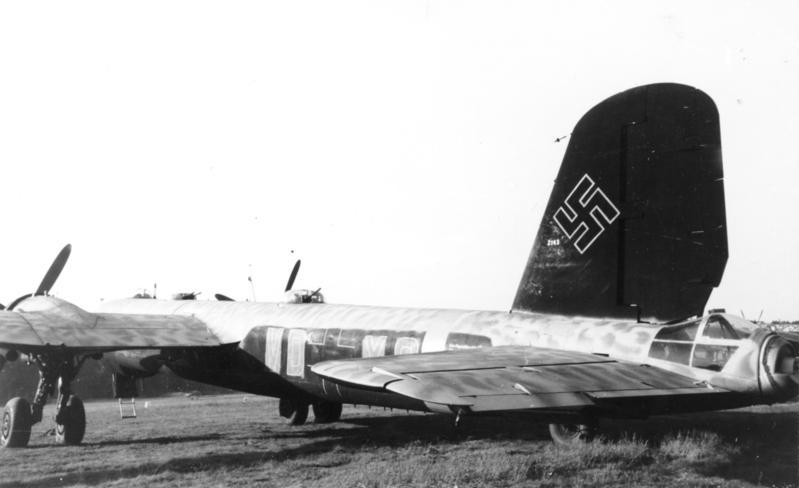
A Heinkel He 177 bomber with the upper-wing style standardised Balkenkreuz on the fuselage, and with flat black undersurfaces and fuselage sides.

Production examples of the Heinkel He 177, however, curiously most often came from the Heinkel and subcontracting Arado factories with a set of Balkenkreuz insignia, most often the upper-wing narrow flank variant used as standard for all Luftwaffe aircraft, in all six positions throughout its deployment in the war, as was regulation before July 1939 for the entire Luftwaffe — these were often displayed without the outermost black "flanks", seemingly making the existing white "flanks" appear to be even thinner than regulation, which through photogrammetric examination of some examples, make the stroke width of the white "flanks" on some He 177 airframes as narrow as 1/80 the length of the core cross from end to end, only one-quarter as wide as the 1/20 regulation width called for on the upper wing Balkenkreuz regulation dimensions. Sometimes the wide-flanked underwing Balkenkreuz would be substituted for the narrow-flank version on some He 177A aircraft, and was already in use on many He 177As in that position.

Until 1935, civilian aircraft only had a registration painted on. This was usually the letter D (for Deutschland) national identification letter in use from before 1928, followed by three or four numbers. After 1935, military planes carried, on the fuselage, an alphanumeric four-character Geschwaderkennung code with the Balkenkreuz after the first two characters, always consisting of one letter and one number in a unique combination for a specific Geschwader or Gruppe. The third letter always designated the individual aircraft ID within a Staffel, while the fourth letter designated the Staffel itself within the larger Geschwader or Gruppe unit it belonged to.

=== Camouflage schemes ===
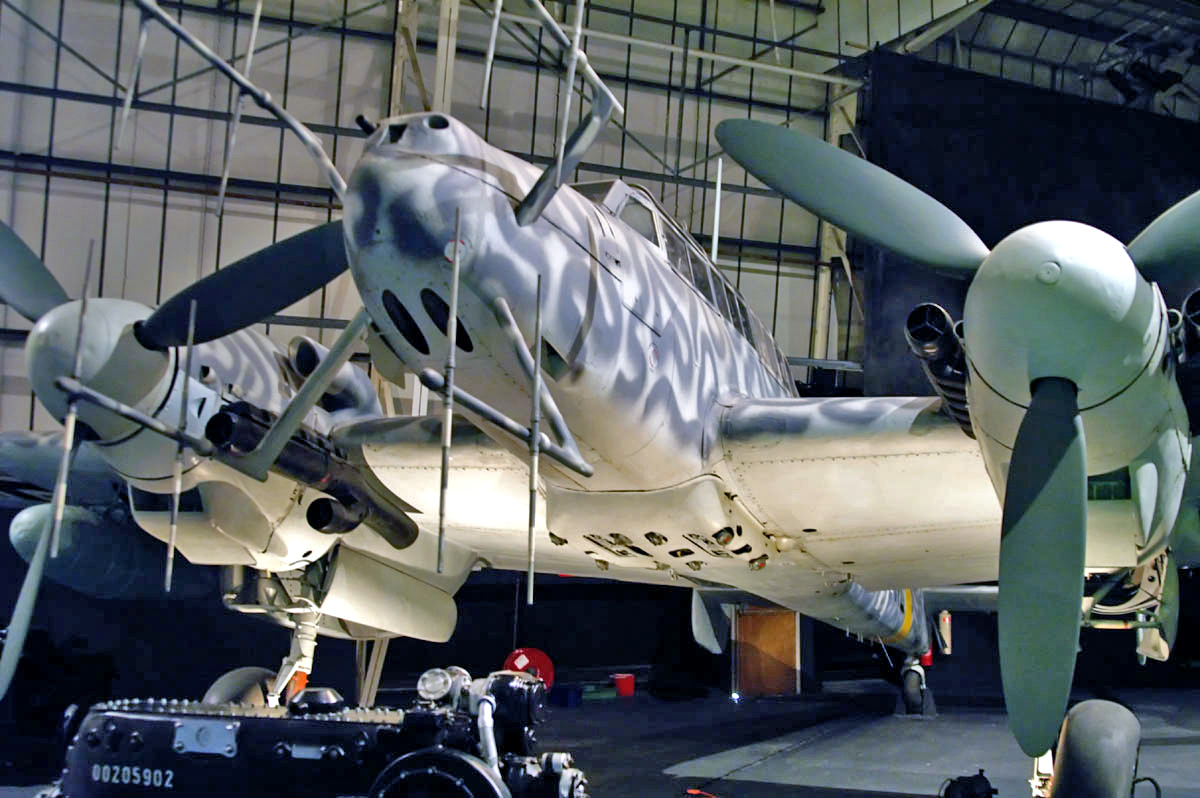
A museum-preserved Bf 110G night fighter with its accurate light base-colour nocturnal camouflage, also bearing "wave-mirror" irregular gray lines

In the Luftwaffe, there were centralised regulations on field camouflage patterns. In practice, these were either amended or ignored. Units in various areas used their own way of painting the aircraft excepting the Geschwaderkennung alphanumeric unit identifiers. Units in the very northern parts of Europe used pale blue wavy lines on a grey background. Night units of both fighters and bombers tended to colour their aircraft completely black with a light brown or light grey pattern. This changed in early 1942: night fighters were painted a light grey on the upper surfaces and fuselage/nacelle sides, with light blue undersides, then over-sprayed with either irregular dark grey spots or irregular dark grey lines over all their upper surfaces. The irregular lines were meant to match the intricate patterns of ocean waves (usually called "wave-mirror" camouflage) as seen from the air, especially for interceptions of RAF night bombers over the North Sea. The nighttime skies over Germany usually had some light from either moonlight or even from city lights reflecting upwards into the skies, making a light base colour effective for night fighters against sometimes cloudy or foggy skies below the night fighters' usual combat altitudes. Reconnaissance and maritime aircraft operating over the North Sea tended to paint the underside light blue and the top side in a dark grey or dark green to resemble the sea. By 1943, as economic conditions tightened, front line units used captured allied paint where available. Central control over camouflage relaxed even further.

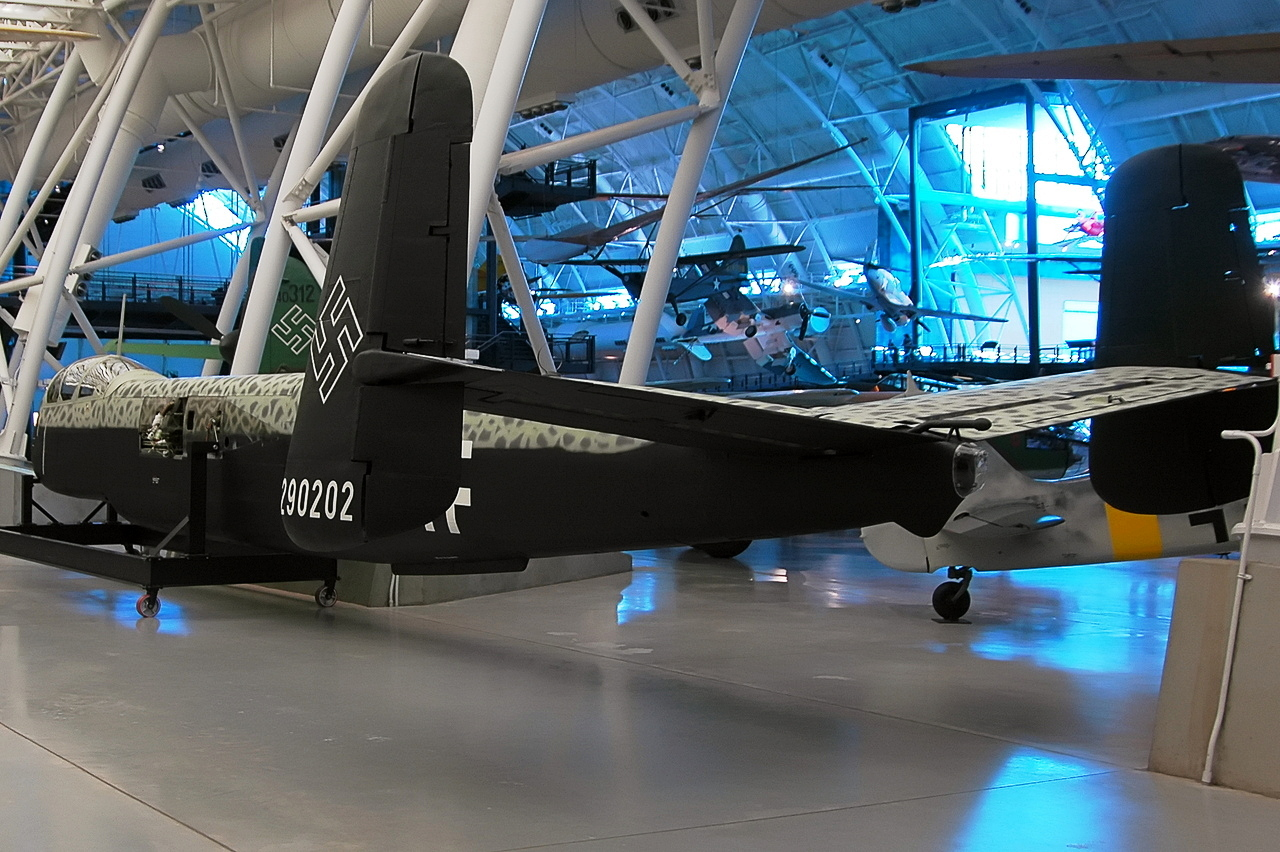
Heinkel He 219 fuselage in museum with later flat black undersurfaces

Later-deployed examples of both night fighters defending the Reich, and Heinkel He 177 heavy bombers used for night raids over England such as with Operation Steinbock, often returned to using flat black undersurfaces replacing the light blue previously used during the mid-war years, while retaining the skyglow-based light grey base colour/darker gray "wave-mirror" irregular lines or irregular splotches on the upper surfaces. With units disbanding and reforming frequently, intricate patterns became less common. Dark green became more or less the standard. With deteriorating conditions and scarce supplies, various motley colour schemes were used. This changed only for those day fighter and "destroyer" units that flew as part of the Defence of the Reich (Reichsverteidigung) campaign. Later in 1944 these units adopted the pattern of a distinct colour band, or two-coloured bands, around the aft fuselage, with each Geschwader usually having their own unique combination.

==== Day fighter units ====
Single engine fighter units used chevrons to represent the pilot's rank or seniority. Bars, points or crosses to represent the Gruppe to which it belonged, and a number representing the Jagdgeschwader were also utilised. The Geschwaderkommodore of a fighter geschwader was represented by two chevrons and a vertical bar. The Gruppenkommandeur was represented by two chevrons; while a Gruppe Technical Officer would have a single chevron and a circle. The Geschwader abbreviation such as JG 11, ZG 110 was also applied. For a staff pilot, there would be a thick black line all around the aircraft. Some day fighter units also used geometric patterns of alternating black and white horizontal stripes on the engine cowling, or checkerboard patterns, also on the cowling. During the Defence of the Reich campaign, there was a general adoption of a system of coloured rear fuselage bands, with unique combinations assigned to each Jagdgeschwader engaged in the campaign. Use of these coloured fuselage bands was generally abandoned by mid-1944. At one point, a colour scheme that painted the rudder in white, similar to what had been done during the North African Campaign, was trialled for units dedicated to Defence of the Reich duties, which also included the aforementioned Reichsverteidigung wing-code rear fuselage stripes for each individual Jagdgeschwader.

The unofficial way to represent one's unit was the unit badge. These were solely at the discretion of the commanding officer, so badges of all shapes, sizes and subjects appeared. On the Eastern Front, they were officially banned in later years as they provided intelligence to the enemy.

==== Remaining units ====
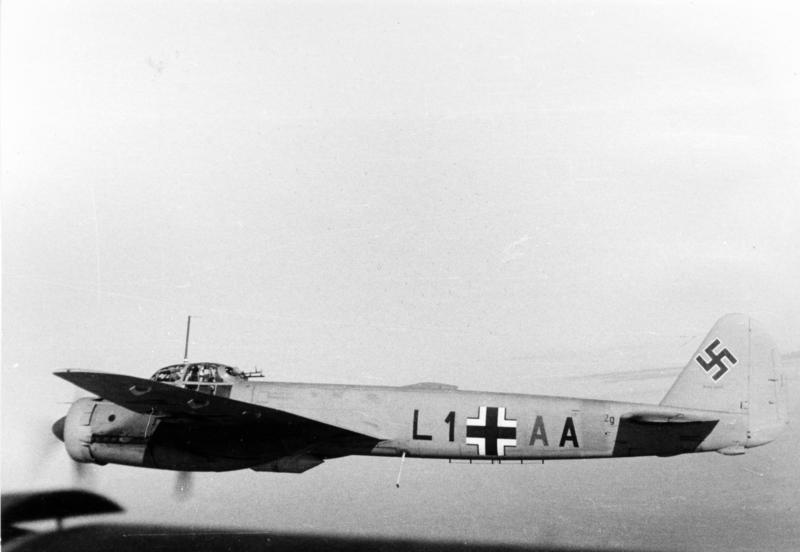
A photo of a Ju 88A displaying the Geschwaderkennung of Geschwaderstab/LG 1

Geschwader combat wings, other than day fighters, during the war usually bore a four-character identification code, starting with a two-character alphanumeric Geschwaderkennung ("wing code", a code unique to each Geschwader) to the left of the national Balkenkreuz marking and two letters to the right, signifying the individual aircraft's letter within its Staffel as the third letter and the Staffel-designating letter within the Geschwader as the fourth and last letter. The full four-character code was usually shown on the fuselage sides, sometimes with the individual aircraft letter repeated under the wings. Gruppe and Staffel-sized units could also have their own unique codes of this type, most often used for reconnaissance and maritime aviationGruppen and Wekusta weather observation Staffeln, with Staffel sized units using the four-character alphanumeric code almost always using an "H" as the fourth and last character. Late in the war, the first two characters of the Geschwaderkennung code (designating the geschwader) were depicted on the fuselage sides in a much reduced size, possibly as a "low-visibility" security measure. The code tended (though not always), to be omitted altogether by 1945.

== See also ==
- Luftwaffe personnel structure
- List of RLM paint designations
- Organization of the Kriegsmarine
- RLM aircraft designation system
- RLM numbering system for gliders and sailplanes
- Stab (Luftwaffe designation)
