= DFS Model 6 =

German target glider prototype

The DFS Model 6 was a target glider built by Deutsche Forschungsanstalt für Segelflug in 1936. It was intended for anti-aircraft training, but only prototypes were built. It was assigned the RLM designation 8-6.
