= RLM aircraft by manufacturer =

See List of RLM aircraft for a numerical listing or RLM aircraft designation system for an explanation of naming system

The following is the list of RLM aircraft by manufacturer.

== Albatros ==
- Albatros Al 101, 'L 101', two-seat sportsplane + trainer, 1930
- Albatros Al 102, 'L 102', two-seat sportsplane + trainer, 1931
- Albatros Al 103, 'L 103', two-seat sportsplane + trainer, 1932

== Arado ==
- Arado Ar 64, fighter (biplane)
- Arado Ar 65, fighter/trainer (biplane - re-engined Ar 64)
- Arado Ar 66, trainer + night fighter
- Arado Ar 67, fighter (biplane) (prototype)
- Arado Ar 68, fighter (biplane)
- Arado Ar 69, trainer (biplane) (prototypes), 1933
- Arado Ar 76, fighter (biplane) + trainer
- Arado Ar 80, fighter (prototype)
- Arado Ar 81, two-seat biplane (prototype)(1936)
- Arado Ar 95, coastal patrol + attack (biplane seaplane)
- Arado Ar 96, trainer
- Arado Ar 196, ship-borne reconnaissance + coastal patrol (seaplane)
- Arado Ar 197, naval fighter (biplane - derived from Ar 68)
- Arado Ar 198, reconnaissance
- Arado Ar 199, seaplane trainer
- Arado Ar 231, fold-wing U-boat reconnaissance aircraft (prototype)
- Arado Ar 232, transport
- Arado Ar 233, seaplane (concept), 1940
- Arado Ar 234, Blitz ('Lightning'), bomber (jet-engined)
- Arado Ar 240, heavy fighter + attack
- Arado Ar 396, trainer
- Arado Ar 440, heavy fighter + attack
- Arado Ar 532, cancelled transport

== Bachem ==
- Bachem Ba 349, Natter (Adder or Viper), interceptor (rocket-engine)

== Blohm & Voss ==
- Blohm & Voss BV 40, glider interceptor
- Blohm & Voss BV 138, flying-boat (early versions designated as Ha 138)
- Blohm & Voss Ha 139, long-range seaplane
- Blohm & Voss Ha 140, torpedo bomber flying-boat (prototype)
- Blohm & Voss BV 141, reconnaissance (asymmetric)
- Blohm & Voss BV 142, reconnaissance + transport
- Blohm & Voss BV 143, glide bomb (prototype)
- Blohm & Voss BV 144, transport
- Blohm & Voss BV 155, high-altitude interceptor (formerly Me 155)
- Blohm & Voss BV 222, Wiking (Viking), transport flying-boat
- Blohm & Voss BV 238, flying-boat (prototype), largest Axis military aircraft design to fly
- Blohm & Voss BV 246, Hagelkorn (Hailstone), long-range radar-homing glide bomb

== Bücker ==
- Bücker Bü 131, Jungmann (Young Man), trainer (biplane)
- Bücker Bü 133, Jungmeister (Young Champion), trainer + aerobatics (biplane)
- Bücker Bü 180, Student (Student), trainer
- Bücker Bü 181, Bestmann (Bestman), trainer + transport
- Bücker Bü 182, Kornett (Ensign), trainer

== Deutsche Forschungsanstalt für Segelflug (DFS) ==
- DFS 6, may be 'Model 6' or 'DFS B6'
- DFS 39, Lippisch-designed tail-less research aircraft
- DFS 40, Lippisch-designed tail-less research aircraft
- DFS 194, rocket-powered research aircraft, forerunner of Me 163
- DFS 228, rocket-powered reconnaissance aircraft (prototype only)
- DFS 230, transport glider
- DFS 331, transport glider (prototype)
- DFS 332
- DFS 346, supersonic research aircraft (incomplete prototype only)

== Dornier ==
- Dornier Do 10, (Do C1) fighter (prototype), 1931
- Dornier Do 11, (Do F) medium bomber, 1931
- Dornier Do 12, Libelle III (Dragonfly III), seaplane, 1932
- Dornier Do 13, medium bomber, (Development of Do 11), 1933
- Dornier Do 14, seaplane (prototype)
- Dornier Do 15, prototype for a passenger plane and bomber (Do Y)
- Dornier Do 16, Wal (Whale), reconnaissance flying-boat
- Dornier Do 17, Flying Pencil; mail-plane, bomber, reconnaissance, night-fighter
- Dornier Do 18, bomber + reconnaissance flying-boat, 1935
- Dornier Do 19, four-engined Ural bomber heavy bomber contender (prototype)
- Dornier Do 22, torpedo bomber + reconnaissance flying-boat
- Dornier Do 23, medium bomber, (development of (Do 13/11)
- Dornier Do 26, long-range seaplane
- Dornier Do 214, transport flying-boat (prototype)
- Dornier Do 215, bomber, night-fighter
- Dornier Do 217, bomber, night-fighter
- Dornier Do 317, Bomber B design competitor
- Dornier Do 335, Pfeil (Arrow), fighter-bomber (push-pull engine configuration)
- Dornier Do 435
- Dornier Do 635

== Fieseler Fieseler Flugzeugbau ==
- Fieseler Fi 2 (F2 Tiger, acrobatic sportsplane, 1932
- Fieseler Fi 5 (F-5) acrobatic sportsplane + trainer, 1933
- Fieseler Fi 97, four-seat cabin touring monoplane
- Fieseler Fi 98, biplane fighter, 1936
- Fieseler Fi 103 (Vergeltungswaffe 1), flying bomb
- Fieseler Fi 156 Storch (Stork), STOL reconnaissance aircraft
- Fieseler Fi 167, ship-borne torpedo bomber + reconnaissance (biplane)
- Fieseler Fi 333, transport (concept)

== Flettner ==
- Flettner Fl 184, reconnaissance helicopter, prototype
- Flettner Fl 185, reconnaissance helicopter, prototype
- Flettner Fl 265, reconnaissance helicopter, prototype
- Flettner Fl 282, Kolibri (Hummingbird), reconnaissance helicopter
- Flettner Fl 339, reconnaissance helicopter, project

== Focke-Achgelis ==
- Focke-Achgelis Fa 223, Drache (Kite), transport helicopter (prototype
- Focke-Achgelis Fa 266, Hornisse (Hornet), helicopter (prototype)
- Focke-Achgelis Fa 330, helicopter (prototype)
- Focke-Achgelis Fa 336, scout helicopter (prototype), 1944

== Focke-Wulf ==
- Focke-Wulf Fw 44, Stieglitz (Goldfinch), trainer (biplane)
- Focke-Wulf Fw 56, Stösser (Falcon Hawk), trainer (parasol monoplane)
- Focke-Wulf Fw 57, heavy fighter + bomber (prototype)
- Focke-Wulf Fw 58, Weihe (Kite), transport + trainer
- Focke-Wulf Fw 61, helicopter (prototype)
- Focke-Wulf Fw 62, ship-borne reconnaissance (biplane seaplane)
- Focke-Wulf Ta 152, fighter (derived from Fw 190)
- Focke-Wulf Ta 154, Moskito (Mosquito), night-fighter
- Focke-Wulf Fw 159, fighter (prototype only)
- Focke-Wulf Ta 183, Hückebein, jet-engined fighter (prototype)
- Focke-Wulf Fw 186, autogiro reconnaissance aircraft (prototype)
- Focke-Wulf Fw 187, Falke (Falcon), heavy fighter
- Focke-Wulf Fw 189, Uhu (Eagle-owl), tactical reconnaissance
- Focke-Wulf Fw 190, Würger (Shrike), fighter
- Focke-Wulf Fw 191, Bomber B competitor
- Focke-Wulf Fw 200, Condor, transport + maritime patrol-bomber
- Focke-Wulf Fw 259, Frontjäger (concept)
- Focke-Wulf Fw 300, proposed long-range version of Fw 200
- Focke-Wulf Ta 400, proposed long-range Amerika Bomber
- Focke-Wulf Fw 491, (Fw 391 development) (project)

== Sportsflugzeuge Göppingen, "Göppingen" ==
- Göppingen Gö 1, Wolf I sailplane, 1935
- Göppingen Gö 3, Minimoa sailplane, 1936
- Göppingen Gö 4, sailplane
- Göppingen Gö 5, sailplane, 1937
- Göppingen Gö 9, development pusher-prop aircraft for Do 335 Pfeil

== Gothaer Waggonfabrik, "Gotha" ==
- Gotha Go 145, trainer
- Gotha Go 146, small transport (twin-engine), 1935
- Gotha Go 147, STOL reconnaissance (prototype)
- Gotha Go 229, fighter (flying-wing), alternative designation for the Horten Ho 229/Ho IX
- Gotha Go 242, transport glider
- Gotha Go 244, transport
- Gotha Go 345, assault glider
- Gotha Ka 430, transport glider

== Heinkel ==
- Heinkel He 37, fighter (biplane)
- Heinkel He 38, fighter (biplane)
- Heinkel He 43, fighter (biplane)
- Heinkel He 45, bomber + trainer
- Heinkel He 46, reconnaissance
- Heinkel He 49, fighter (biplane)
- Heinkel He 50, reconnaissance + dive bomber (biplane)
- Heinkel He 51, fighter + close-support (biplane)
- Heinkel He 59, reconnaissance (biplane seaplane)
- Heinkel He 60, ship-borne reconnaissance (biplane seaplane)
- Heinkel He 70, "Blitz" (Lightning), single-engine transport + mailplane, 1932
- Heinkel He 72, Kadett (Cadet), trainer
- Heinkel He 74, fighter + advanced trainer (prototype)
- Heinkel He 100, fighter
- Heinkel He 111, bomber
- Heinkel He 112, fighter
- Heinkel He 113, (alternative designation for He 100)
- Heinkel He 114, reconnaissance seaplane
- Heinkel He 115, general-purpose seaplane
- Heinkel He 116, transport + reconnaissance
- Heinkel He 119, single-engine high-speed bomber (prototypes), reconnaissance aircraft, 1937
- Heinkel He 120, four-engine long-range passenger flying-boat (project), 1938
- Heinkel He 162, Spatz (sparrow), winner of Germany's Volksjäger (People's Fighter) design competition, fighter (jet-engined)
- Heinkel He 172, trainer (prototype)
- Heinkel He 176, pioneering liquid-fuelled rocket-engined experimental aircraft (prototype)
- Heinkel He 177, Greif (Griffon), long-range bomber
- Heinkel He 178, pioneering jet-engined experimental aircraft
- Heinkel He 219, Uhu (Eagle-Owl), night-fighter
- Heinkel He 274, high-altitude bomber
- Heinkel He 277, (from February 1943), never-built long-range bomber design (1943–44), entered in Amerika Bomber competition
- Heinkel He 280, fighter (jet-engined)
- Heinkel He 343, four jet engined bomber
- Heinkel He 519, high-speed bomber (He 119 derivative) (project only), 1944

== Henschel ==
- Henschel Hs 117, Schmetterling (Butterfly), surface-to-air missile (rocket-engined)
- Henschel Hs 121, fighter + trainer (prototype)
- Henschel Hs 123, ground-attack (biplane)
- Henschel Hs 124, heavy fighter + bomber (prototype)
- Henschel Hs 125, fighter + trainer (prototype)
- Henschel Hs 126, reconnaissance
- Henschel Hs 127, jet-engined bomber (prototype)
- Henschel Hs 129, ground-attack
- Henschel Hs 130, high altitude reconnaissance + bomber, Bomber B late entrant (prototype)
- Henschel Hs 132, dive bomber (jet-engined) (prototype)
- Henschel Hs 293, glide bomb (rocket-powered)
- Henschel Hs 294, anti-shipping glide bomb (rocket-powered)
- Henschel Hs 297
- Henschel Hs 298, air-to-air missile (rocket-powered)

== Junkers ==
- Junkers Ju 34, single-engine light transport+reconnaissance, 1933
- Junkers Ju 52, Tante Ju (Auntie Ju), 3-engine transport + bomber
- Junkers Ju 86, bomber + reconnaissance
- Junkers Ju 87, Stuka, dive-bomber
- Junkers Ju 88, bomber + reconnaissance + night-fighter
- Junkers Ju 89, Ural bomber design contender for a heavy bomber (prototype)
- Junkers Ju 90, bomber (prototype)
- Junkers Ju 188, Rächer (avenger), bomber
- Junkers Ju 248, re-designation of Me 263
- Junkers Ju 252, 3-engine transport, replacement for Ju 52
- Junkers Ju 287, heavy bomber (jet-engined) (prototype)
- Junkers Ju 288, presumptive Bomber B competition winner, prototypes only
- Junkers Ju 290, long-range bomber (prototype)
- Junkers Ju 322, Mammut, transport glider (prototype), 1941
- Junkers Ju 352, Herkules (Hercules), 3-engine transport, development of Ju 252
- Junkers Ju 388, Störtebeker, reconnaissance + night-fighter
- Junkers Ju 390, six-engined Amerika Bomber competitor
- Junkers Ju 488, heavy bomber

== Klemm ==
- Klemm Kl 31, single-engine transport, 1931
- Klemm Kl 32, single-engine transport, 1931
- Klemm Kl 33, (Klemm L33), single-seat ultra-light sportplane (prototype), 1933
- Klemm Kl 35, sportplane + trainer, 1935
- Klemm Kl 36, single-engine transport, 1934

== Kramer ==
- Kramer Rk 344, air-to-air missile (rocket-powered)

== Messerschmitt ==
=== Pre-July 1938 designs (from Bayerische Flugzeugwerke) ===
- Messerschmitt Bf 108, Taifun (Typhoon), trainer + transport
- Messerschmitt Bf 109, fighter
- Messerschmitt Bf 110, heavy fighter + night-fighter
- Messerschmitt Bf 161, reconnaissance aircraft (prototype)
- Messerschmitt Bf 162, bomber (prototype)
- Messerschmitt Bf 163, STOL reconnaissance aircraft (prototypes)

=== Post-July 1938 designs (from Messerschmitt Aktiengesellschaft) ===
- Messerschmitt Me 163, Komet (Comet), interceptor (rocket-engined)
- Messerschmitt Me 209, fighter + speed-record aircraft (prototype)
- Messerschmitt Me 209-II, fighter (prototype - Bf 109 derivative)
- Messerschmitt Me 210, heavy fighter + reconnaissance
- Messerschmitt Me 261, long-range reconnaissance
- Messerschmitt Me 262, Schwalbe (Swallow), fighter + attack (jet-engined)
- Messerschmitt Me 263, interceptor (rocket-engined)
- Messerschmitt Me 264, long-range bomber, primary Amerika Bomber competitor (prototype)
- Messerschmitt Me 309, tricycle-geared fighter (prototype - Bf 109 derivative)
- Messerschmitt Me 321, Gigant (Giant), transport glider
- Messerschmitt Me 323, Gigant (Giant), 6-engined transport plane based on the 321 glider
- Messerschmitt Me 409, heavy fighter, (Me 209 derivative) (project), 1944
- Messerschmitt Me 410, Hornisse (Hornet), heavy fighter + reconnaissance
- Messerschmitt Me 510, twin-engine fighter-bomber (Me 410 derivative) (project)
- Messerschmitt Me 609, heavy fighter + bomber (project)

== Siebel ==
- Siebel Fh 104, Hallore, medium transport
- Siebel Si 201, STOL reconnaissance aircraft (prototype)
- Siebel Si 202, "Hummel" sportplane + trainer, 1938
- Siebel Si 204, transport + aircrew trainer
