= Ministry of Aviation (Nazi Germany) =

Government department (1933–1945)

Reich Ministry of Aviation
- Reichsluftfahrtministerium
- Reichsadler

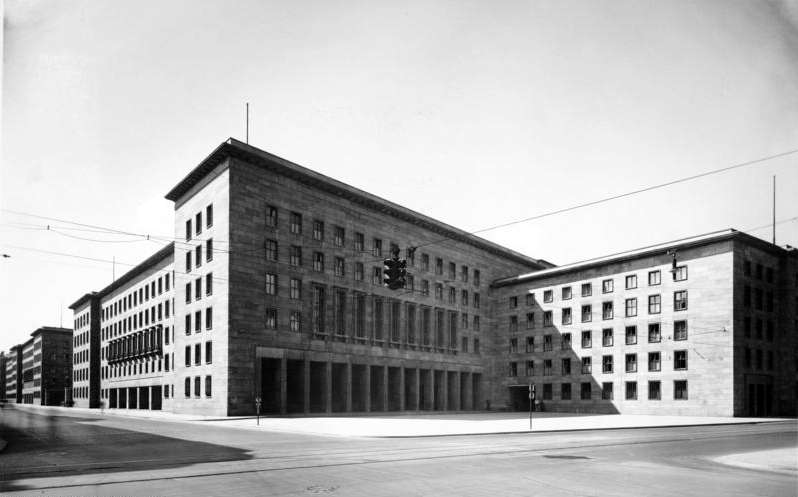
- The Ministry of Aviation, December 1938

Agency overview
- Formed: 27 April 1933
- Dissolved: 5 May 1945
- Jurisdiction: Government of the Weimar Republic (until 1934); Government of Nazi Germany (from 1934)
- Headquarters: Reichsluftfahrtministerium; 52°30′31.31″N 13°23′2.4″E
- Minister responsible: Hermann Göring
- Deputy Minister responsible: Erhard Milch

The Ministry of Aviation (German: Reichsluftfahrtministerium, abbreviated RLM) was a government department during the period of Nazi Germany (1933–45). It is also the original name of the Detlev-Rohwedder-Haus building on the Wilhelmstrasse in central Berlin, Germany, which houses the modern German Finance Ministry (German: Bundesministerium der Finanzen).

The Ministry was in charge of development and production of all aircraft developed, designed, and built in Germany during the existence of the Third Reich, overseeing all matters concerning both military and civilian designs – it handled military aviation matters as its top priority, particularly for the Luftwaffe. As was characteristic of government departments in the Nazi era, the Ministry was personality-driven and formal procedures were often ignored in favour of the whims of the Minister, Reichsmarschall Hermann Göring. As a result, early successes in aircraft development progressed only slowly and erratically during World War II.

== History ==
The Ministry was formed on 27 April 1933 from the Reich Commissariat for Aviation (German: Reichskommissariat für die Luftfahrt), which had been established two months earlier with Göring at its head. In this early phase the Ministry was little more than Göring's personal staff. One of its first actions was to requisition control of all patents and companies of Hugo Junkers, the German aeronautical engineer. These included all rights to the Junkers Ju 52 aircraft.

Defence Minister General Werner von Blomberg decided that the importance of aviation was such that it should no longer be subordinate to the German Army (Heer). In May 1933 he transferred the army's Department of Military Aviation (the Luftschutzamt), to the Ministry. This is often considered the birth of the Luftwaffe. The Ministry was now much larger, consisting of two large departments: the military Luftschutzamt (LA) and the civilian Allgemeines Luftamt (LB). Erhard Milch, the former head of Deutsche Luft Hansa, was placed in direct control of the LA, in his function as Secretary of State for Aviation.

In September 1933, a reorganization was undertaken to reduce duplication of effort between departments. The primary changes were to move the staffing and technical development organizations out of the LB, and make them full departments on their own. The result was a collection of six: Luftkommandoamt (LA), Allgemeines Luftamt (LB), Technisches Amt (LC, but more often referred to as the C-amt) in charge of all research and development, but having no clear way of receiving and acting on requests from front-line combat personnel of the Luftwaffe during the war years, to improve their aviation and weapons technology as a "technical-tactical" department would do in other nations' military aviation bureaux, the Luftwaffenverwaltungsamt (LD) for construction, Luftwaffenpersonalamt (LP) for training and staffing, and the Zentralabteilung (ZA), central command. In 1934, an additional department was added, the Luftzeugmeister (LZM) in charge of logistics.

With the rapid growth of the Luftwaffe following the outbreak of World War II in 1939, the Ministry grew so large that Göring was no longer able to maintain control. This period was marked by an increasing inability to deliver the new aircraft designs that were desperately needed, as well as continued shortages of aircraft and engines. In 1943 Albert Speer took over from Milch, and things immediately improved. Production reached their highest levels in 1943 and 1944, and though Speer introduced the same measures of self-regulation that he had introduced in other areas of industry, and tried to take credit for the so-called Armaments Miracle, contemporary German statistics show that the real reason for increased production were measures and investments made by Milch and his staff in 1941 and 1942. Though German aircraft production had briefly caught up with that of the Soviet Union in 1944, it collapsed in 1945. The RLM never overcame the shortage of raw materials and fuel supply, lack of experienced pilots and deficits in technology and know-how that had handicapped it since the beginning of the war.

The Ministry building was one of the few public edifices in central Berlin to survive the severe Allied bombings in 1944–45.

== Command flags ==
=== Reich Minister for Aviation ===
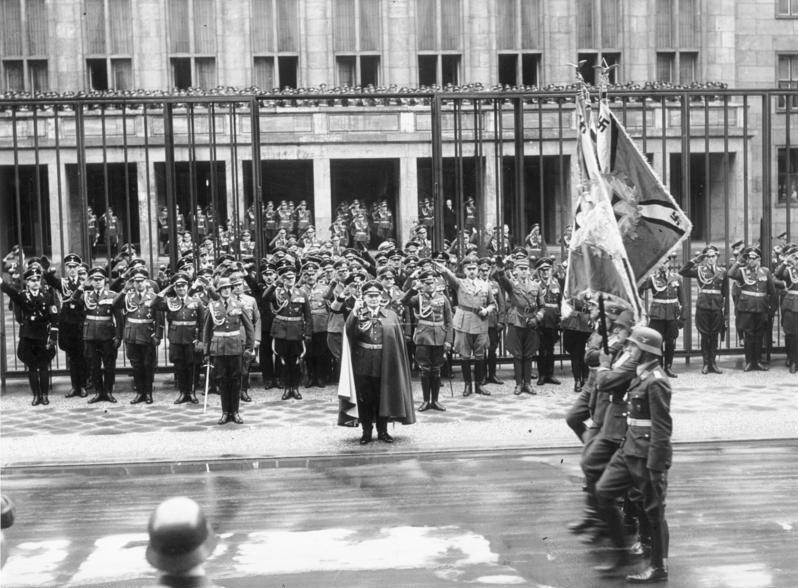
Bundesarchiv Bild 183-H02755, Berlin, Parade zum Tag der Luftwaffe

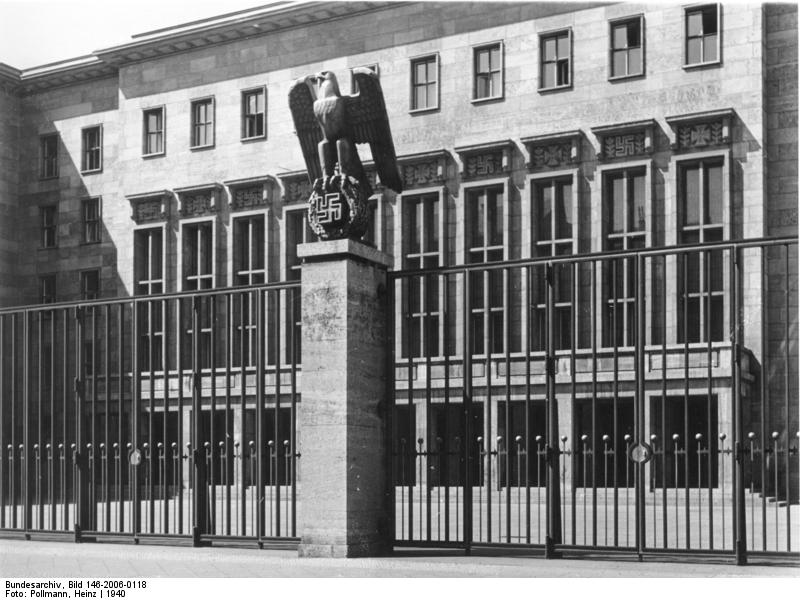
Bundesarchiv Bild 146-2006-0118, Berlin, Reichsluftfahrtministerium

On 5 May 1933 the German Air Ministry, with Hermann Göring as Reich Minister for Aviation (German: Reichsluftfahrtminister) was founded. This event came along with the introduction of a command flag that was produced in different sizes, ranging from 200 to 30 cm (79 to 12 in). The flag consisted of bright red material on which was placed in the centre of the obverse a wreath of silver coloured laurel leaves. In the centre of the leaves was a black eagle. Suspended from the base of the wreath was a true-coloured representation of the "Pour le Mérite". Extending from the left and right side of the wreath were a pair of stylised wings each consisting of four ascending "feathers". Also extending from the wreath towards the four corners of the flag were four black-edged white inactive wedges, a feature that was to be incorporated in the design of the future unit Colours of the new Luftwaffe. In each of the four corners was set a black swastika. The reverse looked almost the same as the obverse but a black swastika replaced the eagle and eagles replaced the four swastikas. The flag was in use until the end of 1935.

Reichsluftfahrtminister 1933 – 1935 (reverse)

Reichsluftfahrtminister 1933 – 1935 (obverse)

=== Reich Minister for Aviation and Commander-in-Chief of the German Air Force ===
On 26 February 1935 Hitler officially created the Luftwaffe with Hermann Göring as its Commander-in-Chief (German: Oberbefehlshaber der Luftwaffe). Late in 1935 a flag was instituted that consisted of a square of bright red silk. The flag was similar to some extent to that used before. The differences of the obverse were that now there was placed in the centre a gold swastika and instead of the four black swastikas four golden Luftwaffe eagles were added. The wings were left out. Moreover, the flag was edged on all four sides with a gold-braided border, which incorporated a row of 76 small gold swastikas all standing on their points. The reverse displayed a golden Luftwaffe eagle in the centre and four golden swastikas set in each corner of the flag. Suspended from the base of the silver laurel was a true representation of the Pour le Mérite. When Göring was promoted to "Generalfeldmarschall" a pair of Luftwaffe field marshal's batons were added to the flag's reverse design and shown crossed above the "Pour le Mérite". The obverse remained the same as before. This alteration took place on 28 April 1938.

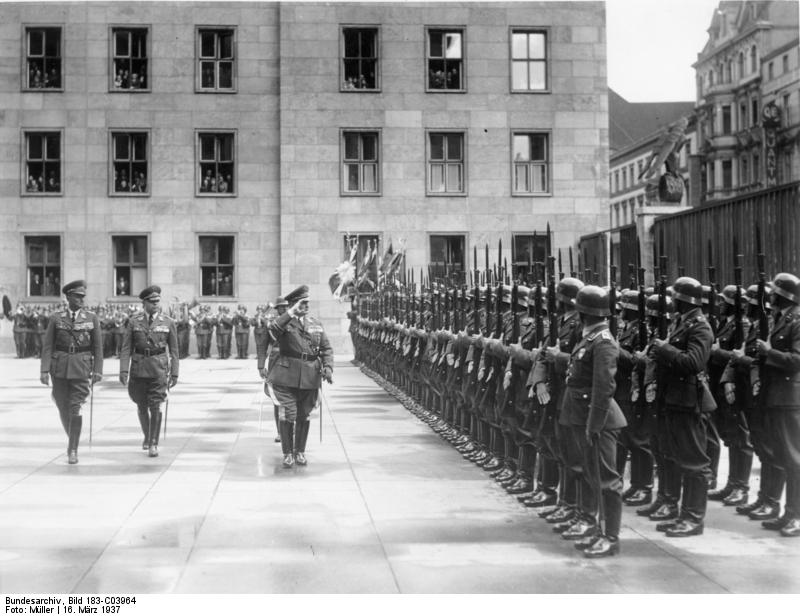
Bundesarchiv Bild 183-C03964, Berlin, Parade zum Jahrestag der Wehrfreiheit

Reichsluftfahrtminister 1935 – 1938 (reverse)

Reichsluftfahrtminister 1935 – 1938 (obverse)

== See also ==
- RLM aircraft designation system
- List of World War II military aircraft of Germany
- List of aircraft engines of Germany during World War II
- List of RLM aircraft (RLM-GL/C list)
- RLM aircraft by manufacturer
- List of weapons of military aircraft of Germany during World War II
- List of RLM paint designations
- Air Ministry – the British government department organising the Royal Air Force
- United States Army Air Forces
- Detlev-Rohwedder-Haus
- Research Office of the Reich Air Ministry
