= RLM aircraft designation system =

German aircraft system

The German Air Ministry (Reichsluftfahrtministerium; RLM) had a system for aircraft designation which was an attempt by the aviation authorities of the Third Reich to standardize and produce an identifier for each airframe type produced in Germany. It was in use from 1933 to 1945 though many pre-1933 aircraft were included and the system had changes over those years. As well as aircraft of the Luftwaffe, it covered civilian airliners and sport planes, due to the RLM handing all aviation-related matters in the Third Reich, both civilian and military in nature.

== The system ==
When the Reichsluftfahrtministerium was given control of the country's aviation activities in 1933, it set out to catalog both the aircraft already in production by various German aircraft manufacturer as well as new projects approved for development by the ministry. The RLM made necessary improvements to a designation system which had been set up in 1929/30 by the Heereswaffenamt (Army Weapons Office) in the Reichswehrministerium (Defense Ministry), together with other institutions related to the industry. The former system had caused confusion in the use of aircraft designations among the different manufacturers; six aircraft of different firms used the number 33. (Note: The Caspar C 33, the Focke-Wulf A 33, the Heinkel HD 33, the Junkers W 33, the Klemm L 33 and the BFW M 33)

The improved designation system was introduced in order to provide a simple and unambiguous identification of every German civilian and military aircraft, be it fixed-wing or rotary-winged, and its corresponding airframe design. The heart of the new system was a (theoretically) unique number assigned by the RLM. In internal paperwork, this number was simply prefixed "8-" (or, in the case of sailplanes, subject to a separate numerical list, "108-"), while "9-" indicated aircraft engines, with 109 prefixing reaction engines (gas turbines, pulse-jets and rockets). The new standardized type designation added two letters representing the manufacturer; Dornier (Do) and Rohrbach (Ro) already used this practice. The first of these two letters was shown in upper case, the second always in lower case, no matter its origin – so Fw for Focke-Wulf or Bf for Bayerische Flugzeugwerke. The very first exemption from this rule was granted several years later to the Blohm & Voss shipbuilding firm, when they renamed their aircraft manufacturing operation – which had been split off from Hamburger Flugzeugbau (Ha) – to Blohm & Voss and received the designation BV for their new aircraft, the first of which was the BV 138 Fliegender Holzschuh maritime patrol trimotor flying boat.

As such the RLM referred to a Messerschmitt twin-jet fighter project internally as type "8-262", although in service the same aircraft would be known as the "Me 262". Originally, these numbers were assigned sequentially and wherever possible attempted to take into account the manufacturers' own in-house design numbers for types already existing in 1933. Duplication resulted from the fact that when one manufacturer abandoned a project, the same number was occasionally re-allocated, with an appropriate time delay, to another manufacturer. One known case that differed from the usual situation involved the airframe number "8-163", used initially for the Messerschmitt Bf 163 competing liaison design that lost its chance at a contract to the Fieseler Fi 156 - the post-July 1938 era's name change from BFW to Messerschmitt AG for the same manufacturer also changed the prefix, the later example being the much more famous Komet rocket-powered interceptor, where the same firm (under a new name and appropriate prefix) re-used the same airframe number.

Lettered prefix designations for major manufacturers
Al	Albatros
Ar	Arado
As	Argus Motoren
Ba	Bachem
Bf	Bayerische Flugzeugwerke (after July 1938, Me for Messerschmitt)
Bü	Bücker Flugzeugbau
BV	Blohm & Voss
DFS	Deutsche Forschungsanstalt für Segelflug
Do	Dornier
Fa	Focke-Achgelis
Fg	Flugtechnische Fertigungsgemeinschaft Prag
Fh	Flugzeugwerke Halle later Si for Siebel
Fi	Fieseler
FK	Flugzeugbau Kiel
Fl	Flettner
Fw	Focke-Wulf
Go	Gothaer Waggonfabrik
Ha	Hamburger Flugzeugbau
He	Heinkel
Hs	Henschel
HM	Hirth Motoren GmbH
Ho	Reimar und Walter Horten
Ju	Junkers
Kl	Klemm Flugzeugbau
Me	Messerschmitt (before July 1938, Bf for Bayerische Flugzeugwerke)
NR	Nagler-Rolz
So	Heinz Sombold
Sk	Škoda-Kauba
We	Weser Flugzeugbau
ZMe	Zeppelin/Messerschmitt
ZSo	Zeppelin/SNCASO

== Prototypes and variants ==
After February 1935, each individual prototype aircraft were suffixed with "V" (for Versuchs German: "prototype") and a unique identification number for an individual airframe for that design type. So, for example, the Me 262 V3 was the third prototype of the Me 262 built. Later in World War II, with such aircraft as the Heinkel He 162, other letters such as "M" for Muster (model) replaced the "V" designation, and even the Me 262's own later prototypes began using the letter "S" for such models.

Once accepted by Deutsche Lufthansa or the Luftwaffe, major variants of the aircraft were suffixed alphabetically with a capital letter. For example, the major variants of the Me 262 were numbered Me 262 A, Me 262 B, and Me 262 C, often using the German "spelling alphabet" for each major variant's letter. While usually sequential alphabetically, this was not always followed; the He 111H followed the He 111P, and the Ju 87R was a long-range (Reichweite) variant of the Ju 87B.

More minor variants were then suffixed numerically, beginning with "-0" for pre-production evaluation versions. Thus, the first batch of Me 262 As supplied by Messerschmitt were designated Me 262 A-0, followed by production versions Me 262 A-1 through to (in the case of this particular aircraft) Me 262 A-5.

More minor variants still were given a lower case alphabetical suffix. When the Me 262 A-1a was to be experimentally equipped with different engines, in this given case the BMW 003 units, it became the Me 262 A-1b.

Additionally, special conversions of basic types were given the suffix /R or /U followed by a number. R was an abbreviation of Rüstsatz, a pre-packaged kit of parts that was usually installed on aircraft in the field, as opposed to requiring an aircraft factory to install one. The Rüstsatz designation was used for modification of basic types in order to be usable for a specific mission task like recon, fighter-bomber or bomber-destroyer. U was Umrüst-Bausatz ("conversion kit"), often contracted to Umbau, and was done with aircraft taken from the assembly line but also in repair workshops with airframes already in use, in any environment equipped at least as well as an aircraft factory would have had. The Umrüst-Bausatz designation was used for smaller equipment changes like additional boost agents for the engine or a different main armament. For example, Me 262 A-1a/U3 referred to a small number of the standard Me 262 A-1a fighters that were modified by Messerschmitt as reconnaissance aircraft. The suffix trop (for tropen "tropical") was applied to aircraft modified to operate in the hot and dusty North African, Mediterranean and southern Russian theatres, for example, the Bf 109 F-4 trop.

Another notable practice in the German aviation industry of the time was for the "increase" of the three-digit section of an earlier design's RLM airframe number by an increment of one hundred for the earlier design's intended upgrade, or replacement: the intended replacement for the Messerschmitt Bf 110, for example, was the Messerschmitt Me 210, and similarly, the Heinkel aviation firm's entry in the May 1942 Amerika Bomber design competition for a trans-oceanic range strategic bomber for the Luftwaffe, initially to be derived from the earlier Heinkel He 177A heavy bomber — as one of a trio of parallel design proposals to fully upgrade the 177A design into a true "four-engined" bomber concept — emerged as an almost totally new design (with heavy He 219 influence) by later in 1943, receiving the designation Heinkel He 277 by February 1943, of which no examples were ever completed to airworthy status before its cancellation in April 1944. The best-known case of the "third-digit increase" scheme occurred with arguably the most versatile airframe design in German production, the Junkers Ju 88 — as successive designs meant to replace the original design went through the airframe numbers 188, 288 and 388, as well as the only four-engined development of the series, the Junkers Ju 488, through using components of most of the three previous designs.

It was also not unknown to re-use an earlier RLM airframe number for an entirely new design, usually when the earlier design bearing a given number had lost a production contract, with other possibilities for the practice coming from the likely desire for disinformation to confuse the Allies. As an example, this occurred between the Messerschmitt firm's competitor for the production contract won by Fieseler's Fieseler Fi 156, having its number reused for the rocket-powered Messerschmitt Me 163 Komet, and could also occur between two different firms, as with Messerschmitt's unsuccessful Schnellbomber having its RLM airframe number re-used for Heinkel's He 162 Spatz (Sparrow) design as the Volksjäger "emergency" jet fighter contract winner.

== Name changes and new constructors ==
In 1933 Germany's largest shipbuilder Blohm & Voss in Hamburg opened an aircraft subsidiary under the name of Hamburger Flugzeugbau. RLM assigned this factory the designation prefix of Ha. However the connection with Blohm & Voss was just too strong and the aircraft coming from the Hamburger Flugzeugwerke were commonly known as 'Blohm & Voss type Ha xxx' . Eventually the RLM gave the factory a new designation of BV for Blohm & Voss.

Bayerische Flugzeugwerke ("Bavarian Aircraft Works") was founded in 1926 out of the bankrupt remainder of former Udet Flugzeugbau. Originally producing its legacy of Udet-designed sportsplanes, it later secured the services of Willy Messerschmitt, not as a chief engineer but as a free-lance designer. Thus BFW in Munich and Augsburg would produce and distribute designs from Flugzeugbau Messerschmitt in Bamberg. In part because of a deep personal animosity between Willy Messerschmitt and State Secretary of Aviation Erhard Milch the RLM awarded the manufacturers designation not to Messerschmitt but to the BFW firm, and thus Messerschmitt's record-setting four-seat sportsplane design, the M 37, was produced as the Bayerische Flugzeugwerke Bf 108. Dissatisfied with this settlement, Messerschmitt himself used the money from the sales of his designs to buy a tract of land in Regensburg, founded the Messerschmitt GmbH aircraft factory and planned (or threatened) to start aircraft production on his own. Forced to choose between giving Messerschmitt his due and becoming a pure subcontractor, on 11 July 1938 the Bayerische Flugzeugwerke took on Messerschmitt as chairman and managing director, took over the Regensburg plant and renamed itself the Messerschmitt AG. The RLM assigned this 'new' aircraft firm the designation prefix of Me. The first aircraft to benefit from the change was the Me 210. Nevertheless, the three production contract aircraft designs from the earlier Bayerische Flugzeugwerke firm in Germany, the Bf 108, Bf 109 and Bf 110 officially kept their "Bf" prefix, due to their pre-July 1938 origins, until the end.

In 1933, the RLM found that its aircraft production was concentrated too much in the South and West of the country and therefore asked Hanns Klemm to relocate his factory Klemm Flugzeugbau from Böblingen in Württemberg to the town of Halle in Saxony. Unwilling to leave his 'home turf,' Klemm teamed up with financier Fritz Siebel and founded Flugzeugbau Halle: a completely new factory in Halle license-building Klemm designs under the RLM designation Fh. However, by the time the first Halle design, the Siebel Fh 104 (that started its life on the drawing board still as the Klemm Kl 104) had flown in 1937, Siebel became majority shareholder of the new factory, bought in his own design team and renamed the factory Siebel Flugzeugwerke KG, henceforth producing aircraft under the RLM letter designation Si, including the definitive Kl 104 development, the Siebel Si 204.

Also in 1933, the glider schools of the Rhön-Rossitten Gesellschaft were incorporated into the Hitlerjugend, while its construction and research team continued as a pure experimental think tank under the name Deutsche Forschungsanstalt für Segelflug or simply DFS. Although the DFS was a pure research facility and lacked the means of series production, several of its designs were license-built by various aircraft factories. Uncharacteristic for the RLM, these designs retained the 3-letter all-capital designation DFS.

A list of the most notable changes in designation appears below:

New designation	Official name	Replaced designation	Former name
BV	Blohm & Voss	Ha	Hamburger Flugzeugbau
Me	Messerschmitt	Bf (after July 1938)	Bayerische Flugzeugwerke
Si	Siebel	Fh	Flugzeugwerke Halle
DFS	Deutsche Forschungsanstalt für Segelflug	(n/a)	(Rhön-Rossitten Gesellschaft)

== Evolution of the designation system ==
By the time the Second World War started, manufacturers increasingly built developments of successful existing types rather than completely new designs. To reflect the lineage of those aircraft, the new types were numbered in steps of 100 above the number of the basic model they were derived from. As mentioned previously, the Junkers Ju 88 formed the basis for the Ju 188, Ju 288, Ju 388, and Ju 488.

Another change in the system was the gradual replacement of the two-letter prefix for the constructor with a prefix for the designer. Almost from the beginning the RLM used an elaborate system of licence-building and subcontracting to maximize its output of huge numbers of relatively few types of 'standard equipment' airplanes. Initially, the factory that designed the plane maintained the biggest share of that planes production. With the war proceeding, the Luftwaffe's need for fresh airplanes quickly outpaced the capacity of the original manufacturers, certainly with its factories now regularly being bombed by the Allies. As a result, the connection between aircraft and original manufacturer eventually lost its significance. Aircraft were now built by a variety of factories often without any links to the constructor whose name it bore. Furthermore, aircraft engineers and designers, a hot commodity for a constructor and therefore aggressively courted and headhunted, were famous for their tendency to leave one company for the next bigger one every few years. Finally more and more of them started their own aircraft development company under their own name. The RLM followed suit by giving their products a two-letter designation reflecting the designer's name rather than the constructor he (originally) worked for. To further complicate things, those new design bureaus were often assigned ranges (or "blocks") of aircraft numbers formerly assigned to other constructors but unused. Thus when Focke-Wulf's chief designer Kurt Tank founded his own design bureau he got assigned the prefix Ta and the block of RLM airframe numbers comprising 8-151 through 8–154. As a result, the further development of his Focke-Wulf Fw 190 became the Tank Ta 152 but remained commonly known as the Focke-Wulf Ta 152.

New designation	Designer (or design team)	Replaced designation	Former manufacturer
Ka	Albert Kalkert	Go	Gothaer Waggonfabrik
Hü	Dr. Ing. Ulrich Hütter	He (Note: Although Hütter never worked for Heinkel, his only aircraft project, the Hü 211 was a development of the Heinkel 219 with a new high aspect-ratio high-performance wing.)	(n/a – university professor)
Li	Alexander Lippisch	DFS / Me	DFS, Messerschmitt
Ta	Kurt Tank	Fw	Focke-Wulf

There is no single "master list" of designations that holds true throughout 1933–1945; the sequence is particularly muddled at the beginning and end of the list. (For see the RLM airplanes arranged by manufacturer, see RLM aircraft by manufacturer)

=== Factory Identification Codes ===
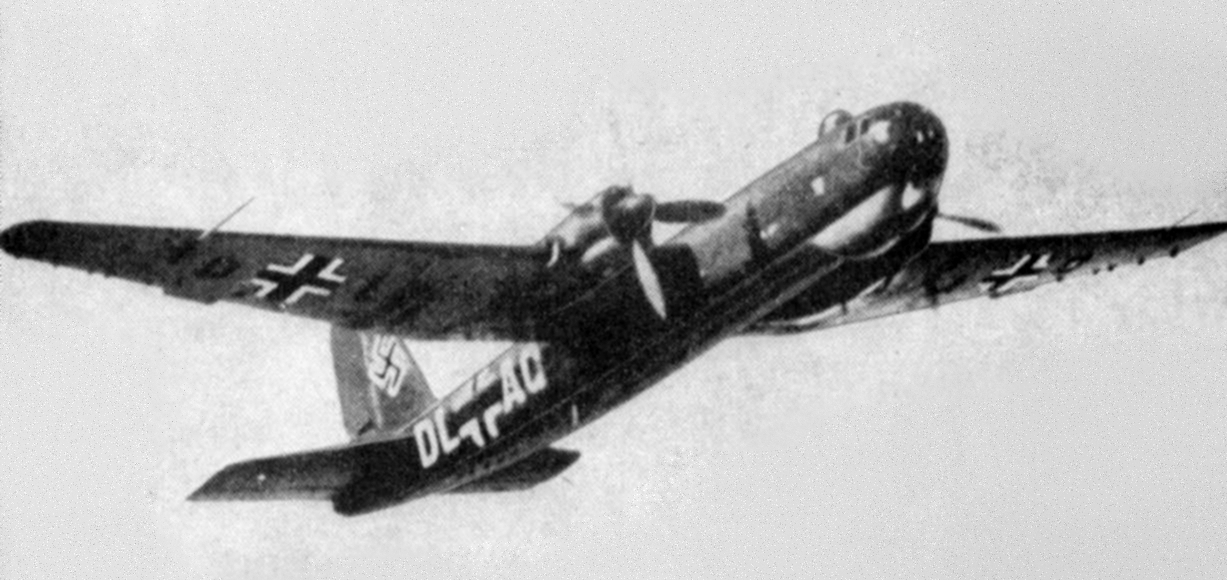
A He 177A-0 prototype with the all-letter Stammkennzeichen marking "DL+AQ"

When a German military aircraft emerged from its production plant, it was given a four-letter Stammkennzeichen code (factory radio code), which was an individual aircraft's radio code before it entered service and staying with the aircraft throughout its entire existence. This format was also usually used for prototype aircraft if they did not bear a German national "D-xxxx" style civil registration. The entire Stammkennzeichen was usually on the fuselage sides, and also often repeated on the undersides of both wings, with the four letters spread out along the entire wing's under-surfaces. The code could also be placed on such things as the manufacturer's identification plate, and sometimes even the compass correction card for a particular aircraft.

== See also ==
- List of aircraft engines of Germany during World War II
- List of aircraft of the French Air Force during World War II
- List of gliders
- List of RLM paint designations
- List of weapons of military aircraft of Germany during World War II
- RLM aircraft by manufacturer
- RLM numbering system for gliders and sailplanes
