= List of RLM paint designations =

List of RLM (Reichsluftfahrt Ministerium) paint designations

Following is a list of RLM (Reichsluftfahrt Ministerium) paint designations used by the German Ministry of Aviation from 1933 through 1945.

== List ==
- RLM - 00, WAßERHELL (Bright Water)

Transparent, primer, protective lacquer and varnish. Gloss.

- RLM - 01, SILBER (silver)

First Luftwaffe aircraft used this as overall colour. Used by trainers due to high visibility until early 1940s, then RLM 03. In general use for undercarriages. Aluminium bronze based paint.

- RLM - 02, RLM GRAU (grey) Single finish coat until 1936.

From 1940 RLM 02 added to or replaced part of RLM 70/71 upper scheme. From 1941 in L.Dv. 521/1 revision made darker and more intense. To be used for aircraft interiors including wheel wells and engine interiors. Cockpits until 1944, then replaced by RLM 66. Standard coat for experimental and prototype aircraft and also used for trainers and liaison aircraft. Used for specific Camouflage patterns until end of War. Including nightfighters as replacement for RLM 76. Continued to be used on RLM 05 painted gliders as contrast between RLM 66 and 05 was regarded as too great.

- RLM - 03, SILBERGRAU (silver grey)

From 3 Feb 1935 paint list of Warnecke un Böhm. Does not appear on RLM colour charts but is officially documented elsewhere. Fuselage and general use before Sept 1939.

- RLM - 04, GELB (yellow)

Marking colour including fuel system markings. Upper surfaces on Maritime aircraft until 1936. Bands, underside of the wingtips and cowlings. Under surfaces of captured aircraft to avoid attack

- RLM - 05, ELFENBEIN (ivory)

Removed from official charts for military aircraft before 1936. Initially used for experimental gliders and aircraft. Used widely for gliders until 1945. Nationalsozialistisches Fliegerkorps gliders until 1945.

- RLM - 21, WEIß (white)
- RLM - 22, SCHWARZ (black)
- RLM - 23, ROT (red)
- RLM - 24, DUNKELBLAU (dark blue)
- RLM - 25, HELLGRÜN (light green)
- RLM - 26, BRAUN (brown)
- RLM - 27, GELB (yellow)
- RLM - 28, WEINROT (maroon)
- RLM - 61, DUNKELBRAUN (dark brown)
- RLM - 62, GRÜN (green)
- RLM - 63v.1, GRÜNGRAU (green-grey)
- RLM - 63v.2, LICHTGRAU (light grey)
- RLM - 65, HELLBLAU (light blue)
- RLM - 66, SCHWARZGRAU (black-grey)
- RLM - 70, SCHWARZGRÜN (black-green)
- RLM - 71, DUNKELGRÜN (dark green)
- RLM - 72, GRÜN (green)
- RLM - 73, GRÜN (green)
- RLM - 74v.1, GRÜNGRAU (grey-green)
- RLM - 74v.2, GRÜNGRAU (grey-green)
- RLM - 75, GRAUVIOLETT (grey-violet)
- RLM - 76, LICHTBLAU (light blue)
- RLM - 77, HELLGRAU (light grey)
- RLM - 78, HELLBLAU (light blue)
- RLM - 79, SANDGELB (sand-yellow)
- RLM - 79, SANDBRAUN (sand-brown)
- RLM - 80, OLIVGRÜN (olive-green)
- RLM - 81v.1, BRAUNVIOLETT (brown-violet)
- RLM - 81v.2, BRAUNVIOLETT (brown-violet)
- RLM - 81v.3, BRAUNVIOLETT (brown-violet)
- RLM -82, LICHTGRÜN (light green)
- RLM -83, DUNKELBLAU (dark-blue)
