= Bäumer Aero =

German aircraft manufacturing company (1922–1930)

Bäumer Aero GmbH
- Industry: Aerospace
- Founded: 1922
- Founder: Paul Bäumer and Harry von Bülow-Bothkamp
- Defunct: 1930
- Fate: Voluntary liquidation
- Headquarters: Hamburg, Germany
- Key people: Paul Bäumer, Harry von Bülow-Bothkamp, Siegfried and Walter Günter

Bäumer Aero GmbH was a German aircraft manufacturing company founded by and named after Paul Bäumer. It is noted for producing the Bäumer Sausewind monoplane sports aircraft.

== History ==
Paul Bäumer and Harry von Bülow-Bothkamp were successful fighter pilots in World War I and founded Bäumer Aero GmbH in Hamburg, Germany, on 7 November 1922 for the purpose of the sale of aircraft, accessories for airports, and airships. Initially, the company sold aircraft manufactured by Udet Flugzeugbau and Dietrich Flugzeugwerke.

Bäumer Aero GmbH produced its first aircraft model, the Red Bird motor glider, in 1924. In 1925 the company became generally known for its Bäumer Sausewind sports aircraft, which was successful in the 1925 Round Germany Flight. The company manufactured a total of four examples of the successful Sausewind. The Alsterkind and Puck models followed.

The company's design and construction team consisted of the young engineers Walter Günter, Walter Mertens, and Werner Meyer-Cassel. Walter Günter's twin brother Siegfried joined in 1926.

On 15 July 1927, Paul Bäumer was killed instantly while flying as a freelance test pilot when the Rohrbach Ro IX fighter he was demonstrating to a Turkish Army commission. After he climbed to 5,000 metres (16,400 ft), the plane entered a spin. He was unable to recover and crashed into the Öresund, off Copenhagen, Denmark. As he was the primary driving force of Bäumer Aero GmbH, all of the company's development and planning work came to a standstill after his death. It took nearly a year before the Sausewind IV was completed in May 1928. Another year elapsed before the new Libelle model was produced. The Libelle was not successful, with both examples crashing. The company was liquidated at the end of 1930.

== Products ==
=== Aircraft ===
- Bäumer B I Roter Vogel
- Bäumer Sausewind
- B III Alsterkind
- Bäumer B V Puck
