= Heinkel He 49 =

Prototype fighter aircraft series

He 49
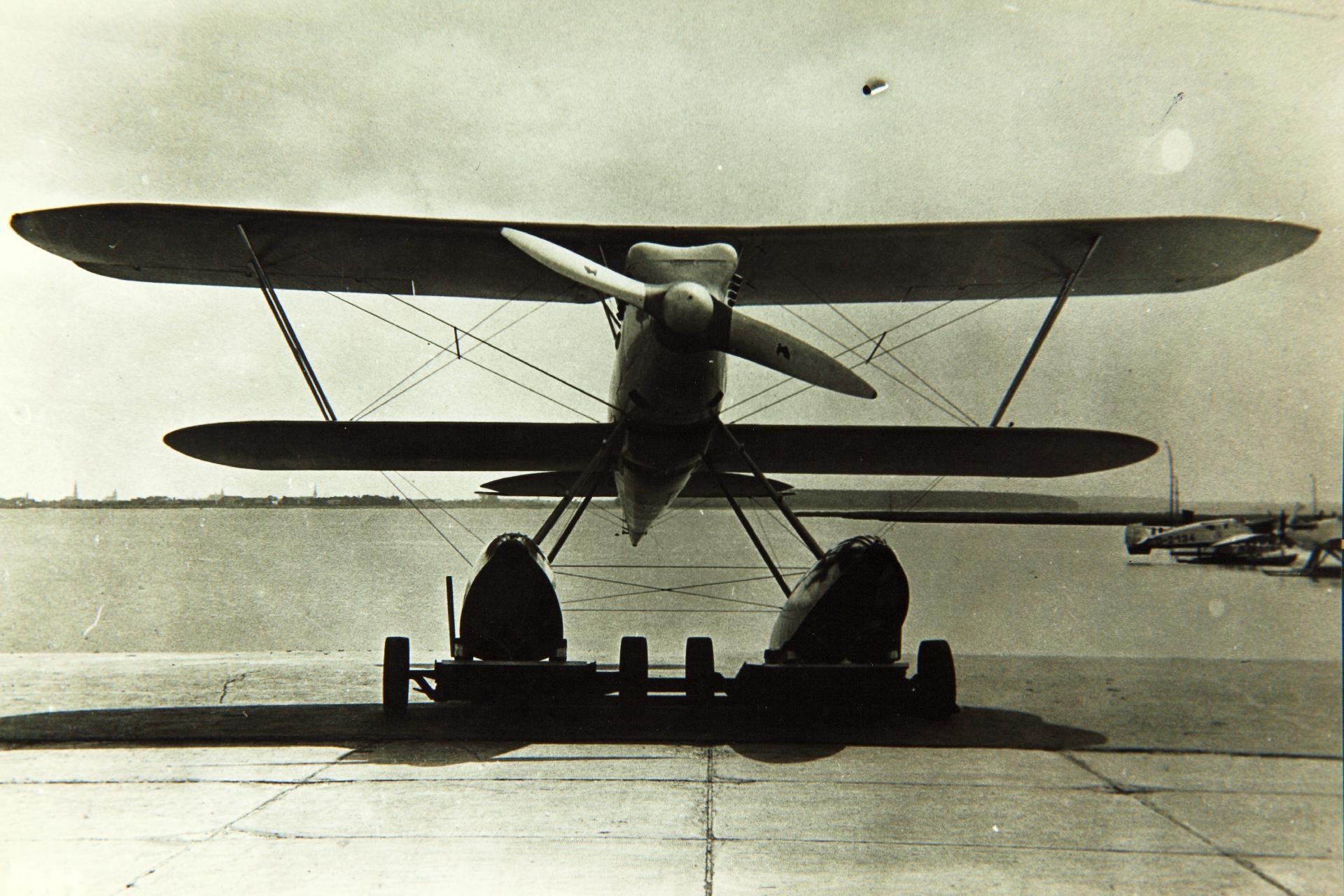
- The He 49bW floatplane

General information
- Type: Fighter
- Manufacturer: Heinkel
- Designer: Günter brothers
- Primary user: Luftwaffe
- Number built: 4

History
- First flight: November 1932
- Variant: Heinkel He 51

The Heinkel He 49 was a German single-bay, single-seat biplane of mixed construction armed with two machine guns. Four variants were made, the He 49a, He 49b, He 49c and He 49d.

== Variants ==
Data from:

HD 49
original Heinkel designation for the He 49, before allocation of the Reichsluftfahrtministerium (RLM) designations.
He 49L
generic designation for any of the He 49 landplane variants.
He 49W
generic designation for the He 49 floatplane variant.
He 49a
The first prototype, (originally HD 49), was flown in November 1932
He 49b
the second prototype followed in February 1933, with a modified fuselage to make it 400 mm (16 in) longer, powered by a BMW VI 6.0 V-12 engine.
He 49bW
The He 49b turned into a floatplane
He 49c
The third prototype
He 49d
later prototype Heinkel He 51

== Specifications (Heinkel He 49b) ==
Data from The Complete Book of Fighters, Die Deutsche Luftrüstung 1933–1945 Vol.2 – Flugzeugtypen Erla-Heinkel

General characteristics

- Crew: 1
- Length: 8.24 m (27 ft 0 in)

Floatplane: 8.57 m (28.1 ft)

- Wingspan: 11 m (36 ft 1 in)
- Wing area: 27.2 m^{2} (293 sq ft)
- Gross weight: 1,950 kg (4,299 lb)

Floatplane: 1,970 kg (4,340 lb)

- Powerplant: 1 × BMW VI 6.0 V-12 liquid-cooled piston engine, 510 kW (690 hp)

Performance

- Maximum speed: 325 km/h (202 mph, 175 kn)

Floatplane: 310 km/h (190 mph; 170 kn)

- Landing speed (landplane): 90 km/h (56 mph; 49 kn)
- Alighting speed (floatplane): 100 km/h (62 mph; 54 kn)
- Service ceiling: 8,000 m (26,000 ft)

Floatplane: 7,500 m (24,600 ft)

- Rate of climb: 3 m/s (590 ft/min)

Floatplane: 3.4 m/s (670 ft/min)

- Time to altitude: 1,000 m (3,300 ft) in 1 minute 39 seconds

Armament

- Guns: 2 × fixed, forward-firing, synchronised 7.92 mm (0.312 in) MG 17 machine guns
