= Heinkel He 51 =

German single-seat biplane fighter aircraft

He 51
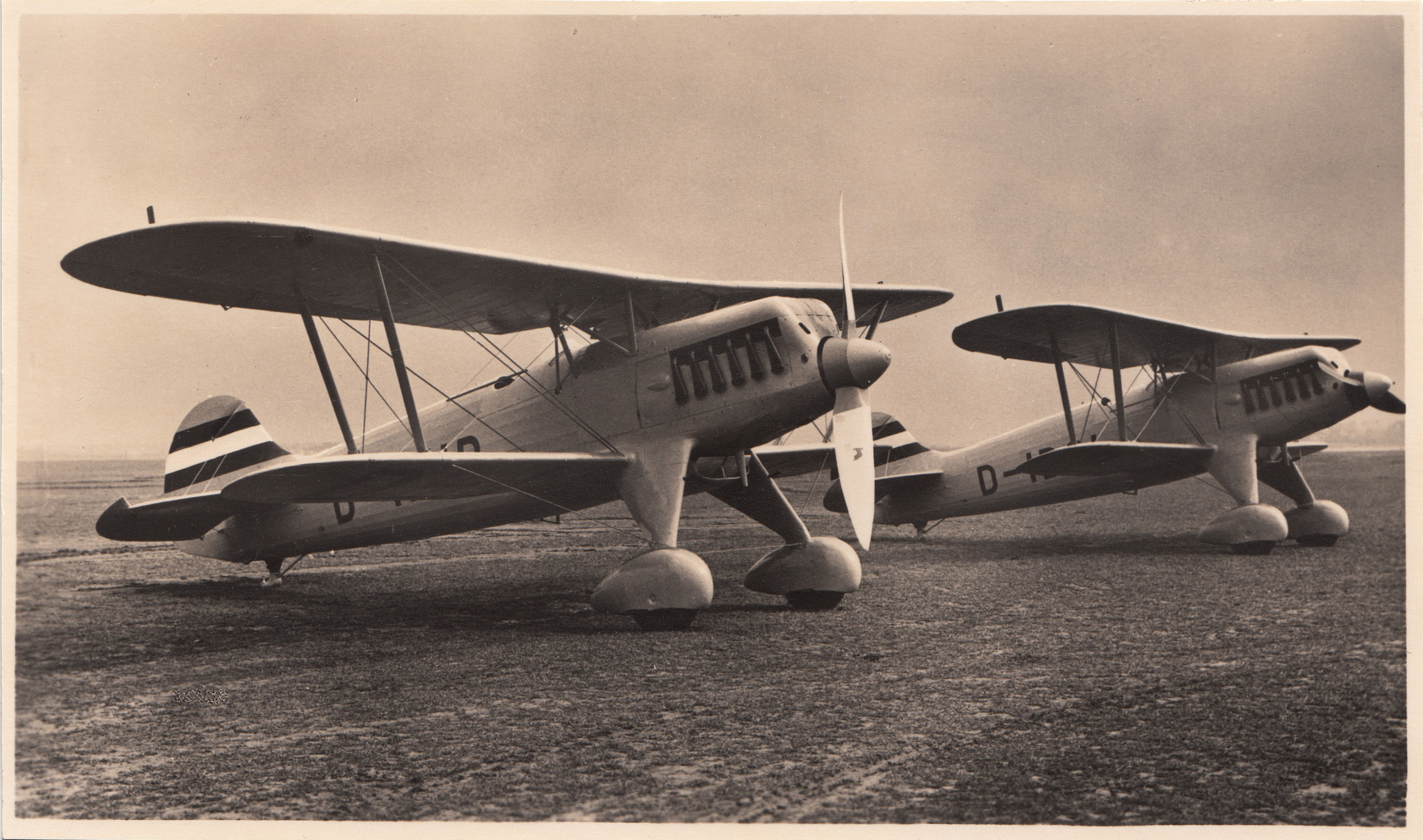

General information
- Type: Biplane fighter-bomber
- Manufacturer: Heinkel
- Designer: Günter brothers
- Status: Retired
- Primary user: Luftwaffe
- Number built: 700

History
- Introduction date: July 1934
- First flight: May 1933
- Retired: 1939 (Luftwaffe) 1952 (Spanish Air Force)
- Developed from: Heinkel He 49

The Heinkel He 51 was a German single-seat biplane fighter aircraft. A seaplane variant and a ground-attack version were also developed. It was a development of the earlier He 49.

== Design and development ==
In 1931, Heinkel recruited the talented aircraft designers Walter and Siegfried Günter. Their first major design for Heinkel was the Heinkel He 49. While this was officially an advanced trainer, in fact it was a fighter.

The type was ordered into production for the still secret Luftwaffe as the He 51, with the first pre-production aircraft flying in May 1933. Deliveries started in July of the next year.

The He 51 was a conventional single-bay biplane, with all-metal construction and fabric covering. It was powered by a glycol-cooled BMW VI engine, with an armament of two 7.92 mm (0.312 in) machine guns mounted above the engine.

The He 51 was intended to replace the earlier Arado Ar 65, and served side-by-side with the slightly later Arado Ar 68. The He 51 was obsolete before it even entered service, and after an initial run of 150 production fighters, production switched to the modified He 51B, of which approximately 450 were built, including about 46 He 51B-2 floatplanes, along with a further 100 He 51C light ground-attack aircraft being built.

== Operational history ==
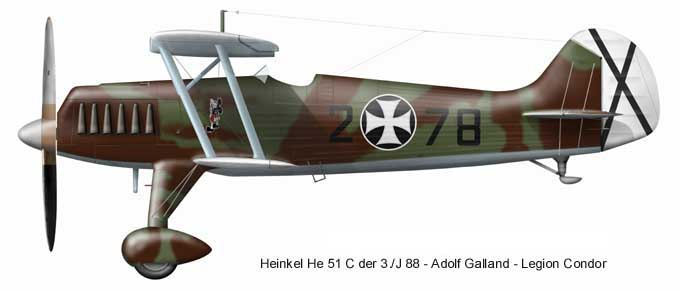
Heinkel He 51C flown by Adolf Galland in Spanish Civil War

On 6 August 1936, six He 51s were delivered to Spain to fight in the Spanish Civil War with the Nationalists. Initial operations were successful, with the Heinkels defeating older, obsolete Spanish Republican Air Force fighters on 18 August 1936, the first day of operations. Deliveries continued, and by November two Nationalist squadrons were equipped with the type, along with three Legion Condor squadrons of 12 aircraft each, manned by German "volunteers".

This time of superiority was short lived, with the arrival of large numbers of more modern aircraft from the Soviet Union, including the Polikarpov I-15 biplane and the new Polikarpov I-16 monoplane, together with the Tupolev SB bomber, which was 110 km/h (68 mph) faster. The He 51 proved unable to protect the Legion Condor's bombers, forcing it to switch to night operations, while also unable to intercept the much faster SBs. The He 51 was soon withdrawn from fighter duty and relegated to the ground-attack role by both the Legion Condor and the Nationalists. It was replaced in the fighter role by the Fiat CR.32 in the Fascist Nationalist Air Force, with the Legion Condor receiving Messerschmitt Bf 109s from April 1937.

While its success as a fighter was short lived, the Heinkel proved more successful as a ground-attack aircraft, being used by Wolfram von Richthofen to develop the close air support tactics used by the Luftwaffe in World War II. It continued in use as such for the remainder of the Civil War, although losses were heavy. After the war, the 46 surviving aircraft would be joined by another 15 newly built airframes, and remain in service in Spain until 1952.

The He 51 lasted in front-line service with the Luftwaffe until 1938, when it was relegated to use as an advanced trainer duties with the Jagdfliegerschulen for the first few years of World War II.

== Variants ==
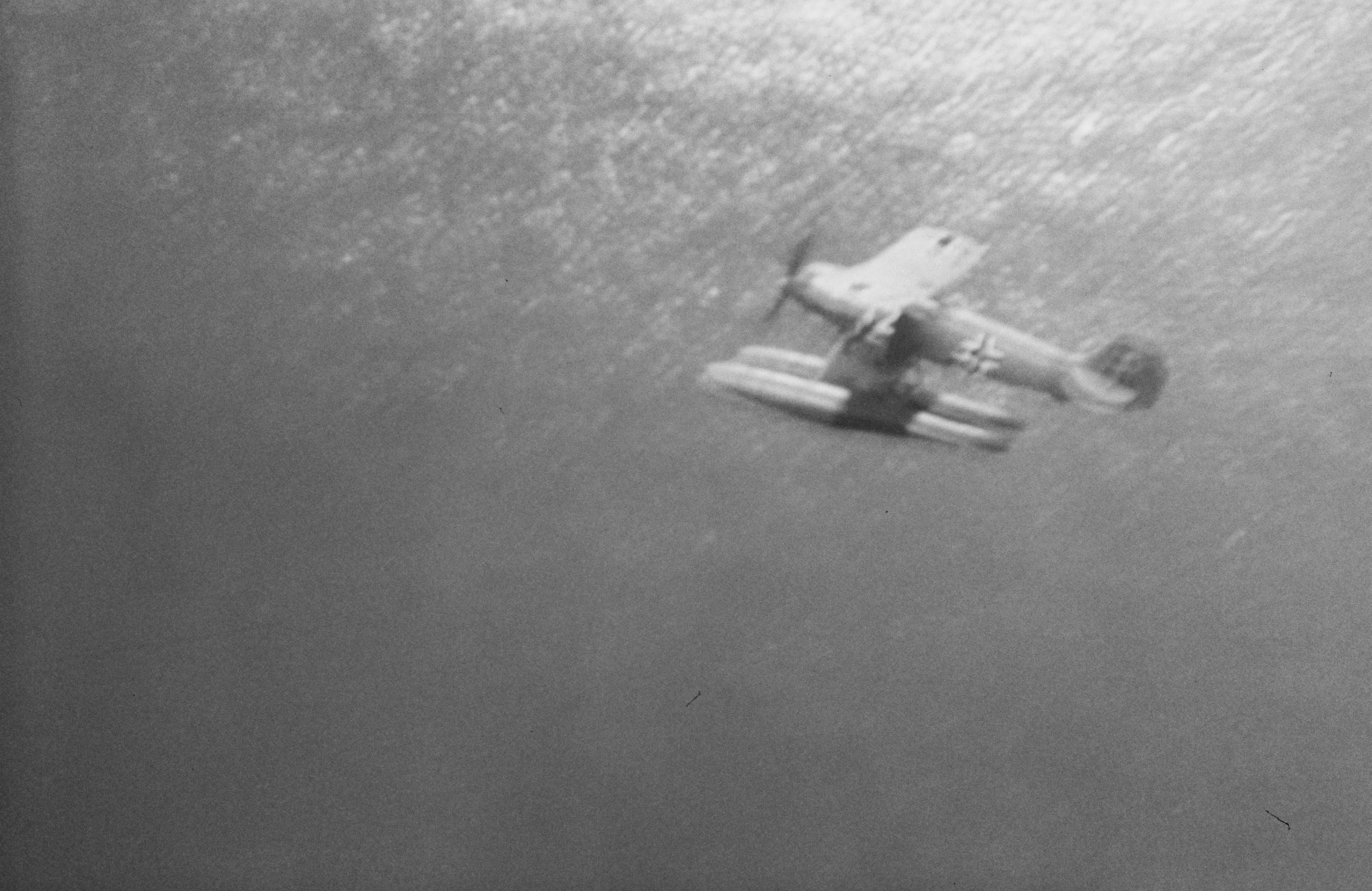
He 51B-2 in flight

He 51a
Prototype, with new vertical tail, revised wings and undercarriage, new radiator compared to the He 49.
He 51A-0
Pre-production aircraft; 9 built.
He 51A-1
Initial production version; 150 built.
He 51B-0
Strengthened pre-production aircraft; 12 built.
He 51B-1
Production version of B-0; 450 built.
He 51B-2
Floatplane fighter and reconnaissance version; 46 built.
He 51B-3
High-altitude version.
He 51C-1
Ground-attack version; 100 built, 79 sent to Spain to equip the Legion Condor and Nationalist air force.
He 51C-2
C-1 with revised radio equipment and other improvements; 21 built.
He 52
High altitude version; one prototype built.
A.1
Spanish Air Force designation for the He 51B-1.

== Operators ==
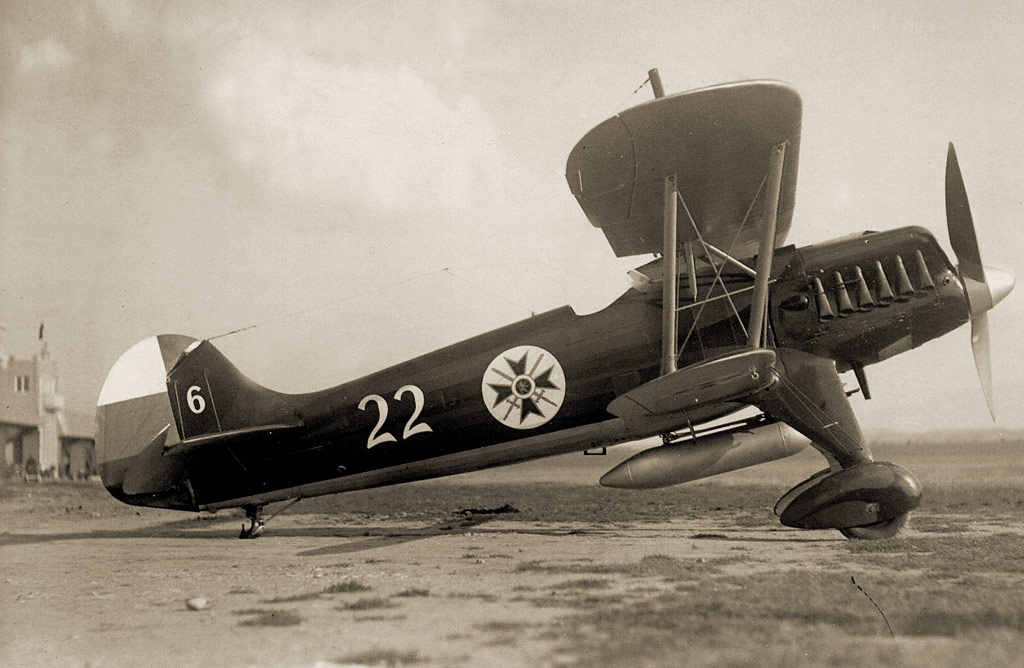
Bulgarian Heinkel He-51B

Bulgaria

- Bulgarian Air Force - Acquired 12 He 51s.

Germany

- Luftwaffe

Spanish State

- Spanish Air Force

== Specifications (He 51B-1) ==
Data from Warplanes of the Luftwaffe

General characteristics

- Crew: One
- Length: 8.4 m (27 ft 7 in)
- Wingspan: 11 m (36 ft 1 in)
- Height: 3.2 m (10 ft 6 in)
- Wing area: 27.2 m^{2} (293 sq ft)
- Empty weight: 1,460 kg (3,219 lb)
- Gross weight: 1,900 kg (4,189 lb)
- Powerplant: 1 × BMW VI 7.3 Z V-12 liquid-cooled piston engine, 559 kW (750 hp)
- Propellers: 2-bladed variable-pitch propeller

Performance

- Maximum speed: 330 km/h (210 mph, 180 kn)
- Cruise speed: 280 km/h (170 mph, 150 kn)
- Range: 570 km (350 mi, 310 nmi)
- Service ceiling: 7,700 m (25,300 ft)
- Time to altitude: 1,000 m (3,300 ft) in 1 minute 24 seconds

6,000 m (20,000 ft) in 16 minute 30 seconds

- Wing loading: 69.9 kg/m^{2} (14.3 lb/sq ft)
- Power/mass: 0.29 kW/kg (0.18 hp/lb)

Armament

- Guns: 2 × 7.92 mm (0.312 in) MG 17 machine guns in nose; 500 rpg
- Bombs: 6 × 10 kg (22 lb) bombs (on C-1/C-2 ground attack variants only)

== See also ==
Related development

- Heinkel He 49

Aircraft of comparable role, configuration, and era

- Avia B-34
- Berliner-Joyce P-16
- Blériot-SPAD S.510
- Boeing P-12E Model 234
- Fiat CR.30
- Fiat CR.32
- Gloster Gauntlet
- Hawker Fury
- Kawasaki Army Type 92 Fighter
- Polikarpov I-15
- PWS-10

Related lists

- List of World War II military aircraft of Germany
- List of military aircraft of Germany
