= Bäumer Sausewind =

Sausewind
- The Sausewind before its famous 5.242km flight in 1925 known as "Der Deutsche Rundflug 1925".

General information
- Type: 2-seat sportplane
- National origin: Germany
- Manufacturer: Bäumer Aero GmbH

History
- First flight: 26 May 1925

The Bäumer B II Sausewind ("Whizzing Wind" or "Restless Person") was a light sports tandem two-seat, open cockpit, wooden cantilever monoplane. It was built by German aviation company Bäumer Aero GmbH, based at Hamburg Airport.

== Design and development ==
The Sausewind's development was triggered when the newspaper BZ am Mittag announced the B.Z. Preis der Lüfte ("B.Z. Prize of the Skies") as part of the 1925 Deutschland-Rundflug ("Round-Germany Flight"), which offered prize money of 100,000 Reichsmarks for the winner.

The twin brothers Siegfried and Walter Günter designed the B II at Bäumer Aero GmbH. The Sausewind was the first aircraft to make use of elliptical wing and tail units, which offered aerodynamic advantages over the rectangular wings that were common at the time. To reduce air resistance all control cables and control levers were installed internally. The undercarriage used split axles to reduce drag compared with a continuous axle.

== Operational history ==
On 31 May 1925, the B II took off from Berlin-Tempelhof for the Round-Germany Flight. The flight time (including several emergency landings) for the distance of 5,242 kilometres (3,257 mi; 2,830 nmi) was 91 hours and 12 minutes over five two-day stages. The Sausewind took second place in Group B for aircraft with a maximum of 80 horsepower (60 kW). It received a prize of 15,000 Reichsmarks.

At the Otto Lilienthal Competition from June 15 to July 23, 1925, the B II won the competition for the highest speed at an altitude of 100 metres (328 ft), reaching 183.5 kilometres per hour (114.0 mph; 99.1 kn), maximum altitude, climbing to 4,770 metres (15,650 ft), and best climb rate, achieving 2.1 metres per second (6.9 ft/s).

== Loss ==
The B II “Sausewind” was lost in a crash during the Saxony Air Tour while in service for the German Air Transport School in Berlin-Staake on September 19, 1925.

== Specifications ==
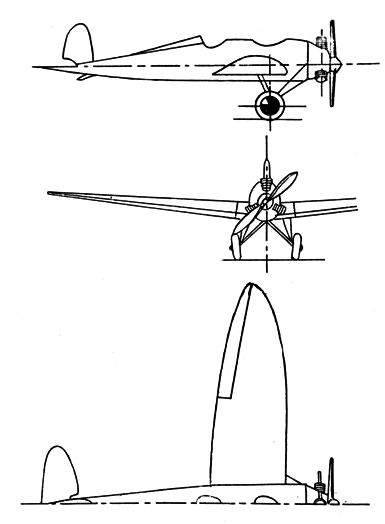
Bäumer Sausewind 3-view drawing from L'Aerophile Salon 1932

Data from The Round Germany Flight

General characteristics

- Crew: 2
- Length: 6.1 m (20 ft 0 in)
- Wingspan: 9.3 m (30 ft 6 in)
- Wing area: 11.6 m^{2} (125 sq ft)
- Aspect ratio: 7
- Empty weight: 280 kg (617 lb)
- Gross weight: 490 kg (1,080 lb)
- Powerplant: 1 × Wright L4 piston engine, 45 kW (60 hp)

Performance

- Maximum speed: 170 km/h (110 mph, 92 kn)
- Rate of climb: 3 m/s (590 ft/min)
