= Siegfried and Walter Günter =

German aircraft designers

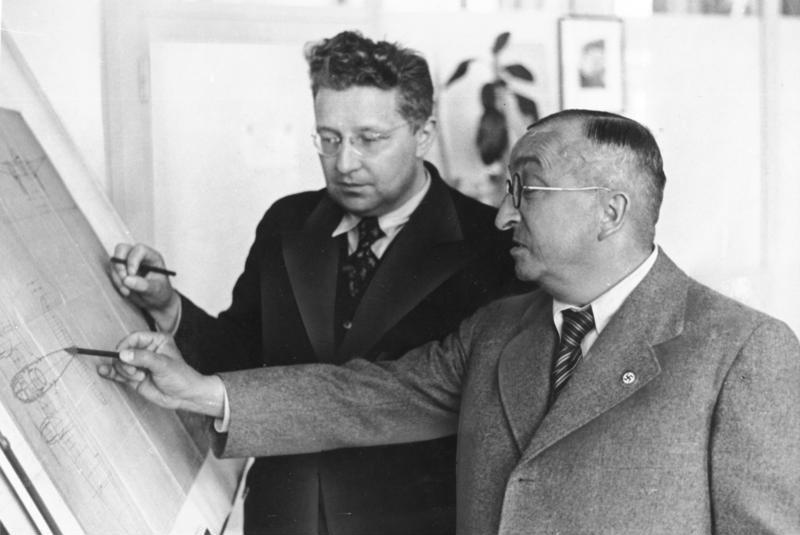
Ernst Heinkel (right) with Siegfried Günter.

Siegfried Günter (8 December 1899 – 20 June 1969) and Walter Günter (8 December 1899 – 21 September 1937) were German twin brothers and pioneering aircraft designers. Walter was responsible for the world's first rocket-powered and turbojet airframes, projects funded by Nazi Germany. Siegfried was the father of the "thrust modulation theory".

== Early life ==
Siegfried and Walter Günter were born on 8 December 1899 in Thuringia. Avid flight enthusiasts, at 16 they had developed their own propeller theories. Both served in the First World War, where they were captured by the British Army and each became a prisoner of war.

The brothers would be educated in mechanical engineering at the Institute of Technology Hannover, specializing in aircraft design and aerodynamics. It was there that Siegfried designed his first aircraft with fellow students Walter Mertens and Werner Meyer-Cassel, the glider H 6. Their talents were first recognised by Paul Bäumer who was impressed by the performance of the H 6 when he saw it being flown at Wasserkuppe. Bäumer offered the brothers, Mertens, and Meyer-Cassel jobs with his company Bäumer Aero in Berlin. There they began designing motor gliders and then increasingly fast sports planes. By 1925 Siegfried had designed first B II "Sausewind" ("Buzzing Wind") airplane for the Deutscher Rundflug 1925 competition, which featured the first elliptic design based on Prandtl's 1918 theory.

== Heinkel Flugzeugwerke ==
On 16 January 1931, Ernst Heinkel recruited Siegfried Günter to work for his Heinkel company in Rostock, and Walter joined the company on 31 July 1931, where he was in charge of developing low and high-speed wind tunnels. There they were to design some of the most important and famous designs associated with the company, including the Heinkel He 51, He 70, He 112, He 100, and the He 111. Walter designed the first ever retractable landing gear in Germany for the He 70, an aircraft mainly designed by Siegfried.

Through their introduction of the elliptical wing planform, their designs set officially recognized speed records. Lufthansa purchased the He 70, nicknaming it the Heinkel-Blitz (blitz means "lightning"), and instituted "blitz" air-routes between Berlin, Cologne, Hamburg, and Frankfurt comparable to today's travel time for the same routes.

During this time Walter submitted airframe designs for what would become the He 178, an experimental turbojet aircraft, and the experimental He 176 rocket plane, in coordination with Hans von Ohain.

As chief project designer by 1937, Siegfried and his team introduced the He 100D-1 on 25 May 1937.

Siegfried would later contribute to the design of the He 219, as well as other prototypes, including the He 177 and He 162.

== Death of Walter ==
Walter was killed in a car accident on 21 September 1937.

== Postwar ==
=== Soviet Union ===
After the Second World War Siegfried worked in Berlin in the car shop of his father-in-law. He approached the Allies offering his expertise, which was refused along with his request for asylum, forcing him to return to the Soviet sector. In 1948 he was taken to the Soviet Union by USSR agents where he worked on Soviet aircraft designs.

=== East Germany ===
In July 1954 Siegfried returned to East Germany.

=== West Germany ===
In 1957 Siegfried went to West Germany, where he again joined the Heinkel works. He was involved in the construction of the EWR VJ 101, the world's first supersonic V/STOL aircraft, and the V/STOL transport aircraft VFW VC 400. Both were experimental designs and never saw serial production.

== Death of Siegfried ==
Siegfried died in West Berlin on 20 June 1969.

== Sources ==
- Regnat, Karl-Heinz. Black Cross Volume 4: Heinkel He 111. Midland Publishers, 2004. ISBN 978-1-85780-184-2
