= Volksflugzeug (disambiguation) =

Volksflugzeug (English: people's aircraft) can refer to:

- Any one of a number of projects to produce a Volksflugzeug, a German popular aircraft design, including:
  - Junkers A50
  - Bücker Bü 180
  - Klemm Kl 105
  - Siebel Si 202
  - Fieseler Fi 253
  - Gotha Go 150
- Volksflugzeug GmbH, a German manufacturer also known as PowerTrike GmbH
