= Volksflugzeug =

Nazi Germany propaganda scheme

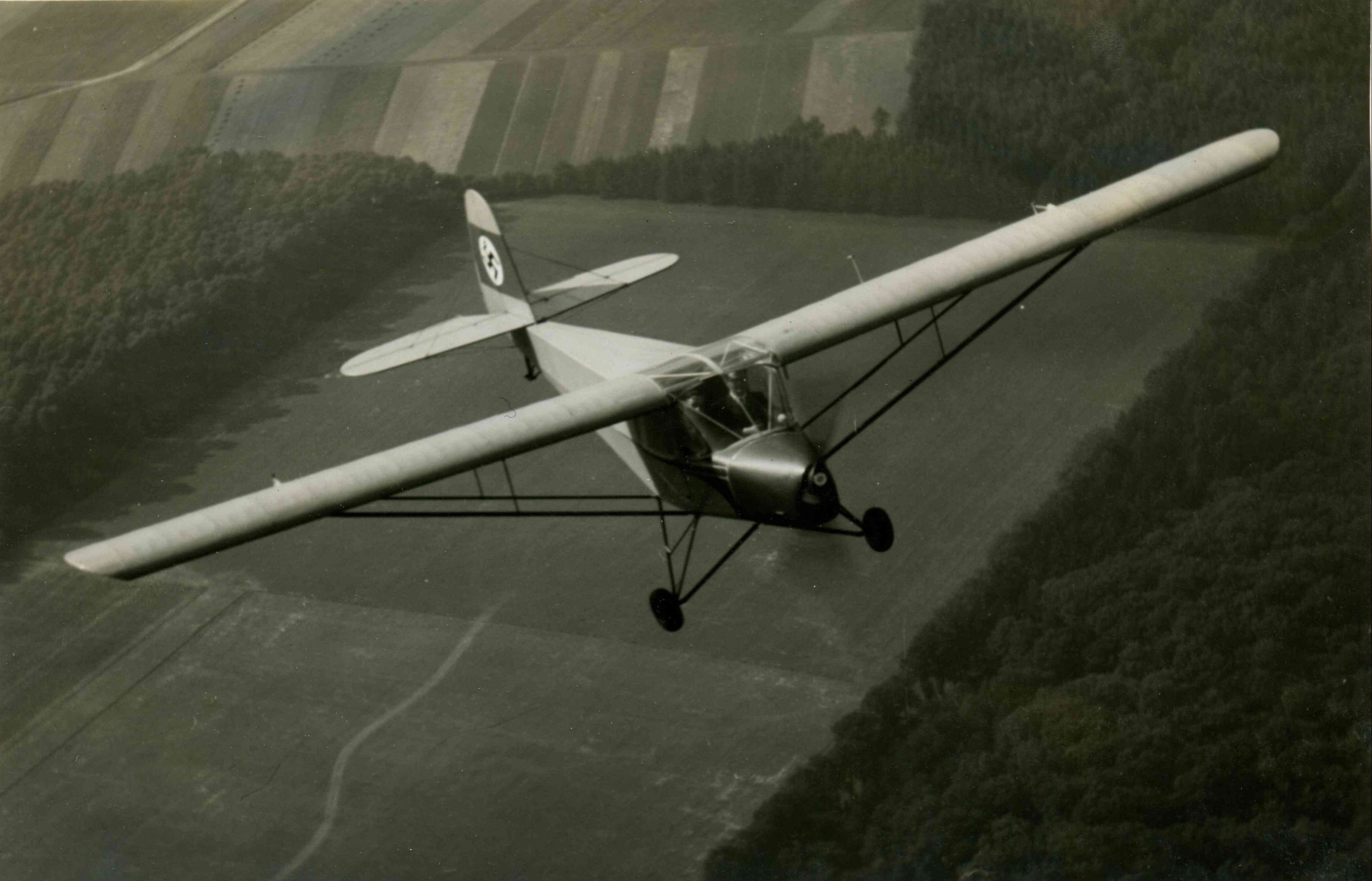
- The Fieseler Fi 253 Spatz, one of the planes that were developed based on the concept of a Volksflugzeug.

General information
- Issued by: Germany

History
- Outcome: Program abandoned due to World War II

The Volksflugzeug (People's Aircraft) was a grand Nazi-era scheme for the mass-production of a small and simple airplane in the 1930s. It was one of the attempts of the Nazi regime to use consumer technologies as a propaganda tool. Unlike the Volkswagen car, the showpiece of the Nazis’ attempt to appear to work for the good of the average German, as well as the less-known Volksempfänger radio, the Volkskühlschrank refrigerator and the Volksgasmaske gas mask, the Volksflugzeug project was contemplated but never fully realized.

The Volksflugzeug grand plan surfaced at different times and in different locations in Germany during Nazi rule. However, since it only had lukewarm official backing, it remained ill-defined and vague. World War II necessitated a change in priorities that abruptly ended most of the projects connected with the scheme.

== History ==
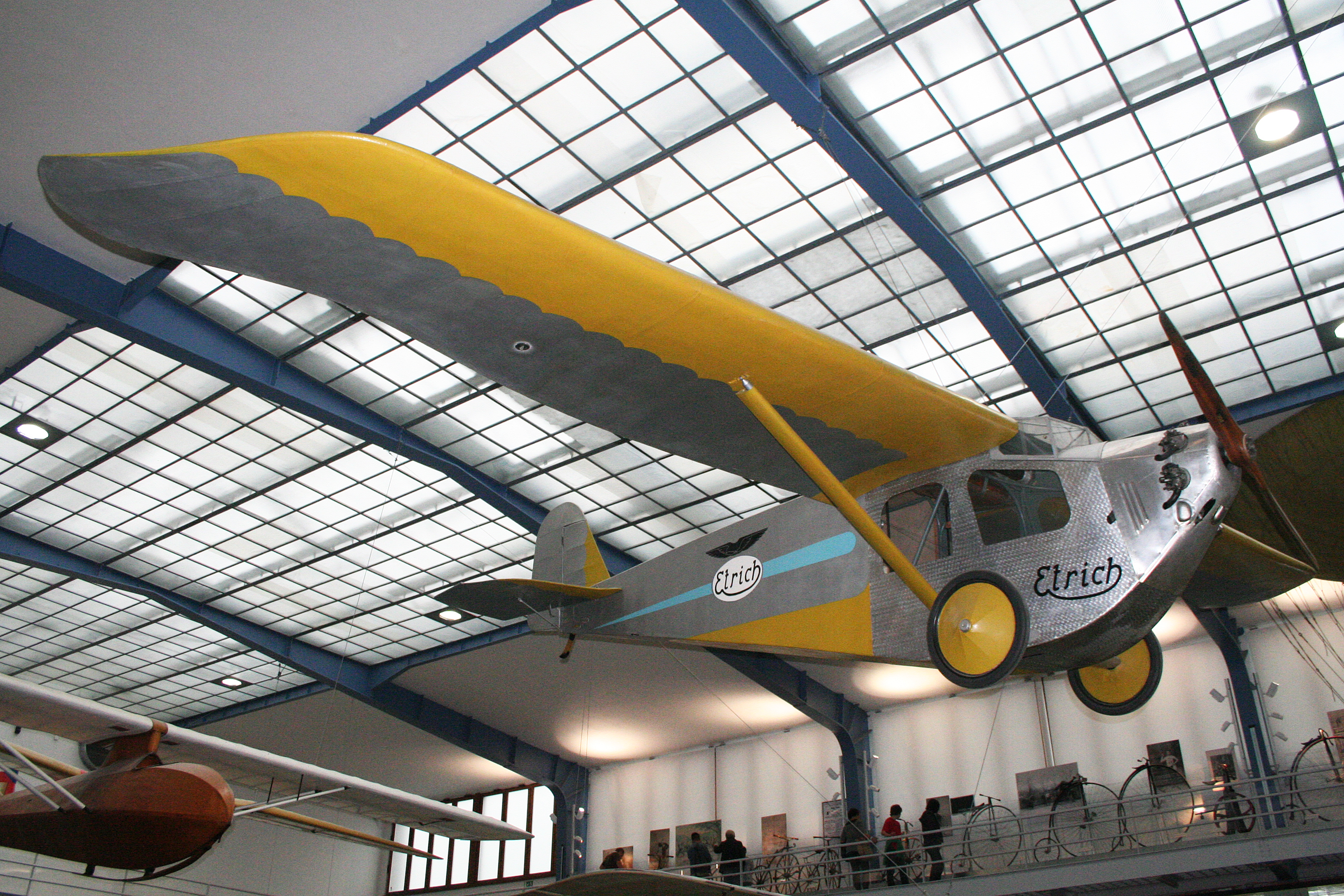
The Etrich Sport-Taube at the National Technical Museum (Prague).

=== Early attempts ===
The idea of a "People's Aircraft" predated the Nazi regime. Its main source of inspiration was Henry Ford’s Ford T. After the industrial production of a cheap car that the ordinary citizen could afford was made possible, there was only one step in the minds of some towards building an aircraft on the same pattern. The idea of a ‘People's Plane’ was put forward to Henry Ford by William Bushnell Stout and Ford immediately became enthusiastic about it. The Ford Flivver was the resulting plane, a project that ended up not becoming as successful as expected.

In Germany itself, some projects in the second half of the 1920 decade were intended as early Volksflugzeug planes. Already in 1928 the Raab-Katzenstein RK-9 Grasmücke (Warbler) was a 2-seat biplane trainer fitted with a 3-cylinder Anzani motor that was planned as a 'Volksflugzeug'. The Etrich Sport-Taube, built in 1929 by the Etrich company, was also intended as a Volksflugzeug, but it soon faced difficulties regarding production in series and the project was given up. Other early People's Aircraft projects were the Deicke ADM 11 Volksflugzeug built in 1933, the Gerner G.I and G.II biplanes, and the Messerschmitt M 17.

Engineers such as Hanns Klemm saw that there was a future in light aircraft. This led Klemm to design the Daimler L15 while he worked at the Daimler Motor Company in Sindelfingen. Klemm had a clear goal: to build in series a Volksflugzeug, a plane that would be low in production costs, fitted with a low-priced motor and low in maintenance. Later, after leaving Daimler, Klemm established his own company Leichtflugzeugbau Klemm in Böblingen.

There was a competition for the construction of a single-seat low-cost Volksflugzeug in the early 1930s before the Nazi Party came to power. In addition to industrial and private companies, also academic groups took part in the contest. Thus the Akademische Fliegergruppe Berlin of the Berlin Technical High School produced the B 4, also known as „FF“, fast fertig (almost ready) and won the first prize. Following the Nazi takeover such Academic Flying Groups were disbanded through a decree issued on 11 April 1933 by the Reichskommissar responsible for aviation.

=== Propaganda tool ===
The prefix ‘Volks-’ became for Nazism a kind of honor badge that was awarded to selected industrial products. The capacity to mass-produce such items flattered a totalitarian state which sought to present itself as a leader in technical progress as well as the forerunner of a more egalitarian world led by the Führer. In the post war years such people's projects were often mentioned as “the good side” of the Nazi times.

Initiative and eventual instructions regarding the “People’s Products” proposals came from the German Labour Front, led by Robert Ley, as well as from the Nazi Propaganda Ministry led by Joseph Goebbels. Political, ideological, as well as economical factors dictated their viability within the Nazi context. The “People’s Products” had a double function, on one hand they were key elements of the official propaganda, which promised an affluent and comfortable future society to citizens, mainly in order to make the actual economic hardships dictated by the German re-armament acceptable to the population. On the other hand, they constituted real plans and visions of a specifically Nazi consumer's society.

The failure of the grand scheme became evident, however, when the economic goal of massive people's consumption revealed itself incompatible with the simultaneous political goals of autarky, re-armament and territorial expansion. By mid-1937 with the German re-armament in full gear, such small planes were labelled as 'weak-engined planes' (schwachmotorige Flugzeuge) and Nazi engineer Hermann Schäfer would write in Berlin that: The name „Volksflugzeug“ is only acceptable for a plane that wide layers of a Volk can afford to buy and upkeep. However, in the foreseeable time one can neither count on a plane of that type nor on the creation of the necessary conditions for it, such as take-off, landing and maintenance infrastructures.

== Development and twilight of the concept ==
The vision behind the Volksflugzeug project was to manufacture a small plane in large quantities that would be affordable for the average citizen of Nazi Germany.

Some of the designs of the Volksflugzeug airplane were developed into viable small aircraft, but not as part of the wider Nazi scheme, such as the Messerschmitt M 33, a very little plane that would have been produced in a 'build-it-yourself' kit. Willy Messerschmitt's idea was to produce a plane so cheap that it would be affordable for anyone with an average salary. Designed during the pre-Nazi takeover of Germany years, the Messerschmitt M-33 never went past the project stage. Other craft, such as the Lehmann Falter, another very little airplane roughly based on the Mignet Pou du Ciel (German: Himmelslaus), were seeking to improve or develop existing designs of very small planes, but remained projects as well.

Engineer Wolf Hirth had pursued the idea of building a Volksflugzeug when he finally built and patented the Hirth Hi-20 MoSe (Motorsegler) in 1937. It was the first motorglider with a non-rigid motor that could change angle.

The Technical Department of the Nazi Ministry of Aviation, the Technisches Amt (LC, but more often referred to as the C-amt) in charge of all research and development, led by Ernst Udet after June 1936, withdrew its favor from smaller aircraft building companies. Industries such as Weser Flugzeugbau (former Rohrbach), Bücker, Ago, Klemm and Fieseler were told that there were no further projects for them to develop because future projects could be handled by the remaining aircraft industrial groups. Instead these small companies were advised to become involved in the production of a so-called Volksflugzeug powered by motors of 50 to 60 hp (37 to 45 kW). The recommendation was taken not only by Klemm, with its Kl 105, Siebel with the Si 202 Hummel and Fieseler with the Fi 253 Spatz, but apparently as well by Bücker with its Bü 134 Student, of which only one was built, even though the Bü 134 was powered by a Hirth HM 504 A motor which with 105 hp (78 kW) fell a bit beyond the scheme.

Two of the further designs made by Bücker's Swedish engineer Anders J. Anderson, the two-seat, open-cockpit Bü 180 Student low-wing monoplane, and the Bü 182 Kornett, could have been the result of the Volksflugzeug proposal made by the LC II, the department of the Technisches Amt responsible for the development of new aircraft. The Bü 182 Kornett, the last plane designed by Anderson, of which only three were built, also found no support in the Air Ministry of the Reich, even though it combined technical progress and low-cost. The Bü 182 Kornett was a highly innovative model, fitted with a low-priced high-performance engine, that would have made a good trainer for the Luftwaffe.

=== Engines ===
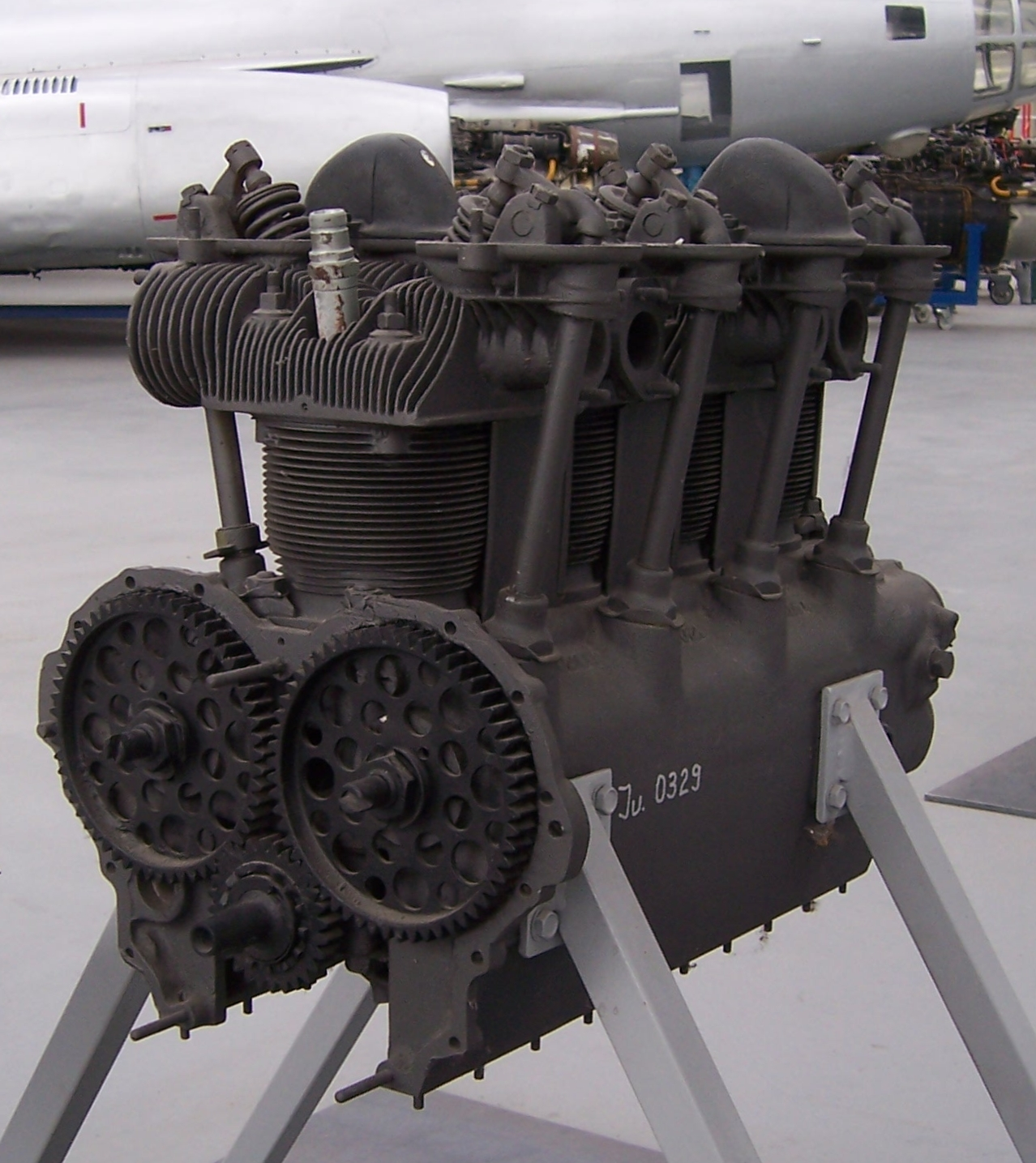
The Zündapp 9-092, one of the light engines used in 'Volksflugzeug' planes

The 1930s saw the development of certain light-weight and low-power aviation engines that were intended for small craft and that made Volksflugzeug-type planes feasible both from the low cost as well as from a technical perspective.

- The Zündapp 9-090, also known as Zündapp Z 90, was a small aeronautical piston engine built by the Zündapp company. Its successor, the Zündapp 9-092, was a more powerful four-cylinder version developed in 1938. Both engines were designed by Ernst Schmidt. Zündapp 9–092 production was terminated in 1940 when about 200 units had been built. Although planes fitted with these engines had broken several records in their class, precedence was given to the production of military plane engines in an industrial scale.
- The DKW company, founded and led by Danish entrepreneur Jørgen Skafte Rasmussen also developed a small 20 hp (15 kW) aviation engine. It was used for the DKW Erla Me 5, a low-cost one-seat low wing Volksflugzeug. Conceived by engineer Franz Xaver Mehr, a small number of Me 5 were built in series in 1933 before the production faced difficulties. In 1934, DKW chief Rasmussen was able to convince the Gauleiter of Saxony, the Reichsstatthalter (representative of Nazi Germany) in the region, to become interested in the project. As a result, the Erla Maschinenwerk G.m.b.H. company was founded in Leipzig and took over production and projects. Rasmussen, nevertheless, left after a few years, when industrial production was shifted to military aircraft.
- The Hirth HM 515 was another low-cost piston engine for small aircraft built by the German aviation company Hirth. It was a little four-cylinder OHV piston engine first presented in 1938. After several tests, only a small number of units were built from 1940 onwards, owing to the lack of demand for small, less-powerful engines during the war years. It would have been used in Volksflugzeug-type planes such as the Bücker Bü 180, Fieseler Fi 253 Spatz, Haller Ha 22 and Ha 23, as well as the Klemm Kl 105, Pause Mücke, Siebel Si 202 and Gotha Go 150.
- Köller was another company building small engines giving 18 hp (13 kW) and 18.5 hp (14 kW). The little Gruse BO 15/1 was a Volksflugzeug project equipped with a Köller M3 18 hp (13 kW) engine driving a pusher propeller. It was a light single seater built by the August Gruse Maschinenfabrik in 1933. Following the scant interest displayed by Nazi authorities, only one prototype was built.

== See also ==
- Ford Flivver
- Hans Grade
- Junkers A50
- Kraft durch Freude
