= Bücker Bü 181 Bestmann =

1939 utility aircraft family

Bü 181 Bestmann
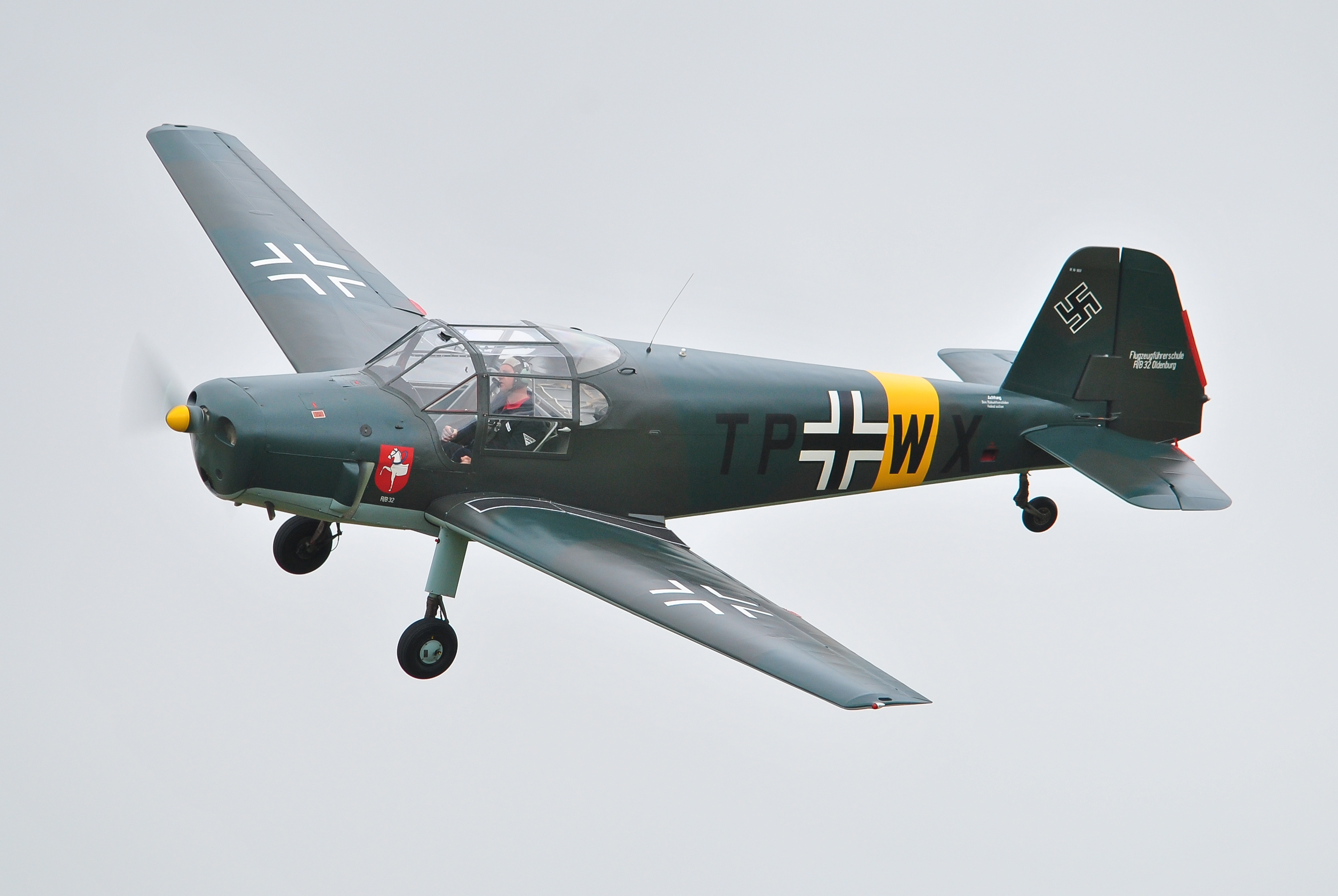
- A restored Bü 181 performing at the Shoreham Airshow 2012

General information
- Type: trainer
- Manufacturer: Bücker
- Primary users: Luftwaffe Czechoslovakia; Egypt; Sweden
- Number built: 3,400

History
- First flight: February 1939

The Bücker Bü 181 Bestmann is a twin-seat single-engine aerobatic monoplane trainer aircraft designed and built by the German aviation company Bücker Flugzeugbau. It was extensively operated by the Luftwaffe throughout the Second World War. The Bü 181 was named Bestmann after a German maritime term designating a member of the deck crew on coastal or fishing vessels.

The Bü 181 is closely related to the Bü 180 Student, sharing numerous technologies and manufacturing techniques. Unlike prior aircraft by the company, it featured a cabin with side-by-side seating. The Bü 181 had been designed to perform sports and touring flights, being suitable for performing aerobatics, although its primary role became that of a trainer. During February 1939, the first prototype conducted its maiden flight. Following the completion of flight testing and an official evaluation by the Reichsluftfahrtministerium (RLM/Reich Aviation Ministry), the Bü 181 was selected to be the standard primary trainer of the Luftwaffe.

Series production of the Bü 181 commenced during 1940. Several different production models, including the Bü 181B and Bü 181C, were produced, although there were only slight variations between then. Germany's wartime demands for aircraft exceeded Bücker Flugzeugbau's capacity, thus the aircraft was manufactured under license by numerous other companies, including Fokker Company, Hägglund & Söner AB, and the Zlin Aviation Works. Thousands of aircraft were operated by the Luftwaffe and other operators, typically as a trainer aircraft. In German wartime service, the Bü 181 would also be used for several roles beyond training, such as a liaison aircraft, a glider tow and even (when crudely armed with Panzerfaust anti-tank grenade launchers) as a ground-attack aircraft.

== Development ==
The origins of the Bü 181 are closely associated with that of the Bü 180 Student, a tandem twin-seat aircraft that was also Bücker Flugzeugbau's first low-wing monoplane design. Many of the construction techniques developed for the Bü 180 were shared with the company's next undertaking, the Bü 181. Unlike the Bü 180, this newer aircraft made use of a side-by-side seating arrangement that was considered to be more well suited for training purposes that the traditional tandem arrangements. Despite this, as well as the company's established primary market being in the trainer sector, the Bü 181 had actually been designed with the intention of promoting it for sports and touring purposes instead.

During February 1939, the first prototype, baring the civil registry D-ERBV, performed its maiden flight; it was flown by Chief Pilot Arthur Benitz. It received a favourable official review, which promptly led to the Bü 181 being selected to become the next standard primary trainer of the Luftwaffe. Quantity production of the initial model, the Bü 181a, commenced during late 1940; the company produced many of these aircraft at its Rangsdorf facility outside Berlin.

Due to the heavy wartime demands imposed upon the company, it became clear that Bücker Flugzeugbau could not produce the aircraft at a sufficiently high rate on its own. Accordingly, the company was directed to issue production licenses for the Bü 181 to other aircraft manufacturers. One such company was the Netherlands-based Fokker Company, which commenced production of the type in 1942; by the end of the conflict, it has completed a total of 708 aircraft, having produced a combination of both the Bü 181B and the slightly modified Bü 181C. Between 1943 and 1945, the Swedish manufacturing concern Hägglund & Söner AB produced 120 Bü 181s under license; these aircraft are often referred to using the Swedish military designation Sk 25.

The Bü 181D was also built by Zlin Aviation Works plant in the Protectorate of Bohemia and Moravia; production was established only just prior to the German withdrawal from Czechoslovakia. For several years following the end of the conflict, production of the aircraft continued at the Zlin Aviation Works; denominated as the C.6 and C.106, numerous examples were taken on by the re-established Czechoslovak Air Force, while various other versions, such as the Zlín Z.281 and Z.381, were also produced for civil purposes, such as flight clubs.

During the 1950s, the Heliopolis Aircraft Works of Egypt acquired a Czechoslovak licence to produce the Zlin Z.381 with a 105 hp (78 kW) Walter Minor engine. It was produced for the Egyptian Air Force as the Heliopolis Gomhouria (meaning "Republic") and subsequent versions were supplied to other Arab air forces. At least 300 Gomhourias were built. Overall, 3,400 aircraft were built, but only a handful survived into the twenty-first century.

== Design ==
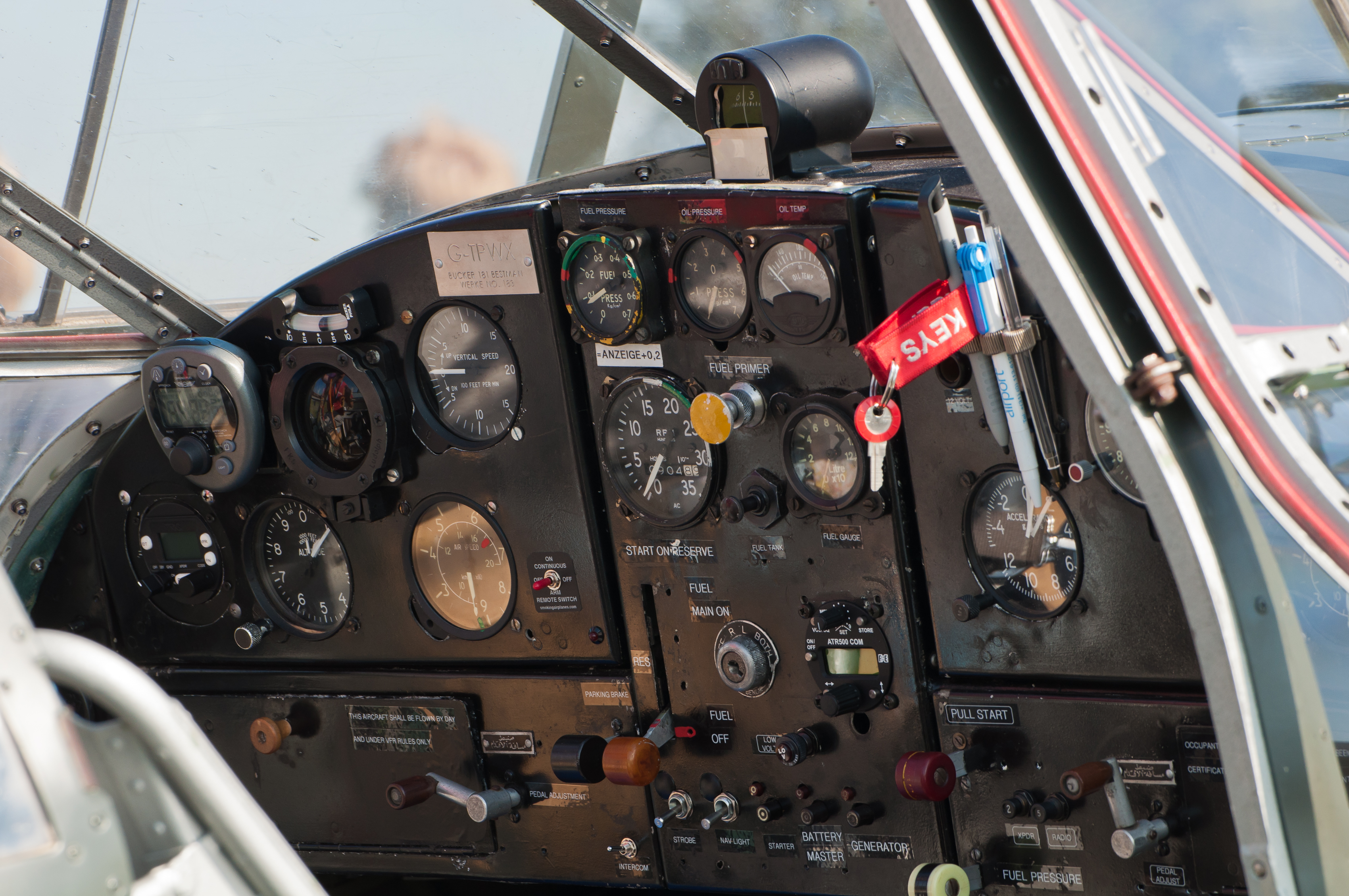
Flight instruments of a Gomhouria 181 Mk6

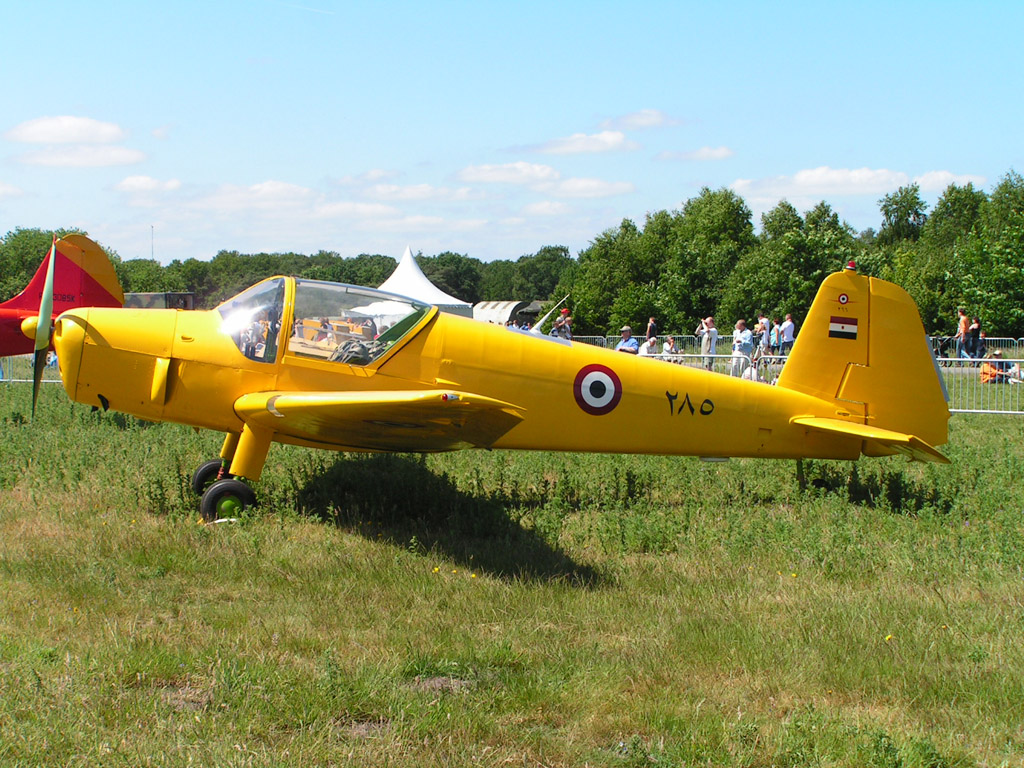
Egyptian Air Force Gomhouria Mk.6 285 at Gilze-Rijen Air Base, the Netherlands

The Bücker Bü 181 Bestmann was a single-engine low-wing monoplane with a compact cabin that accommodated a pair of adjustable seats in a side-by-side arrangement. Both positions were provided with flight controls and seat-type parachutes. Behind the cockpit was a sizable baggage compartment; tanks for both the oil and fuel were also housed within the fuselage. The Bü 181 was powered by a four-cylinder Hirth HM 500A or B four-cylinder inline air-cooled piston engine, capable of providing up to 78 kW (105 hp).

The low-mounted wings of the Bü 181, which tapered sharply in both chord and thickness, had a structure entirely composed of wood. The area between the leading edge and the rear spar was covered with plywood while the remaining area from the rear spar to the trailing edge had a fabric covering instead. Over half of the area of the trailing edge of was occupied by the aircraft's narrow-chord ailerons; in between the ailerons and the fuselage was a set of split flaps. The flaps were metallic on the B types and wood on the C types.

The forward section of the fuselage was of a tubular steel frame construction covered by metal panels while the rear section was a wooden monocoque instead; a wooden framework was also used for the tail unit. The elevators featured trim tabs that could be adjusted mid-flight; while the rudder was also provisioned with trim tabs, these could only be adjusted on the ground. The Bü 181 was furnished with a fixed cantilever-style undercarriage, the single legs of which were furnished with both spring and oil-based shock absorbers.

Its strength corresponded to Stress Group 5 with a limited load (single occupancy) and Stress Group 4 fully laden.

== Operational history ==
Although flown by the Luftwaffe primarily in the trainer role, the type often used to perform various other duties, including as a liaison aircraft and as a glider tow.

From March 1945, an order was issued to concentrate all available Bü 181s for conversion either to the "tank busting" role, for which each aircraft would carry four Panzerfaust anti-tank grenade launchers from wing-mounted remotely operated launchers (C-3 subtype) mounted on short pylons around halfway out from the wing roots (one below and one above the wing panel on each side anchoring the launchers' firing tubes near their forward ends), or to the night harassment role, where they would carry up to three 50-kilogram (110 lb) bombs (B-3 subtype). These units saw very limited use in the final days of the war due to Germany's rapidly declining military situation. However, some missions were carried out, during which moderate success was occasionally accomplished, but almost always at the price of severe losses. One restored Bestmann in the tank buster configuration is on display at the Deutsches Technikmuseum Berlin.

Test pilot and sister-in-law of Claus von Stauffenberg, Melitta Schenk Gräfin von Stauffenberg, was flying a Bücker Bü 181 when she was shot down and fatally wounded in 1945.

== Variants ==
The Bü 181 evolved very little during the war, the differences between the B type and the C types were minimal, the most important being the increased autonomy of the C types. The main difference between the B-1 & C-1 and the B-2 and C-2 sub-types was the presence of pitot heating and position & cabin lights while the B-2 and C-2 types lacked any electrical system.

Bu 181V Prototype.

Bü 181B-0 Pre-production series with Hirth HM 504 A-2 engine

Bü 181B-1 With Hirth HM 500 A engine

Bü 181B-2 As B-1 but no electrics

Bü 181B-3 (Schlachtflugzeug): Night harassment version made from converted B-1s and C-1s carrying improved instrumentation, Revi gunsights and three ETC 50 bomb racks. Bomb loads; either three SC50 or three SD50 or three SD70 or three AB70 droppable clusters. Max. Bomb load 210 kilograms (463 lb).

Bü 181C-1 Increased range and Hirth HM 500B engine.

Bü 181C-2 As C-1 but no electrics

Bü 181C-3 (Panzerjäger): B-2 or C-2 subtypes modified for the antitank role carrying four wing mounted Panzerfaust 100 single-use antitank grenade launchers in pairs, two on each wing.

Post war license built & developments

Zlín Z.181
Two-seat primary trainer aircraft. Czech production version of the Bu 181, built by Zlín in Czechoslovakia after the war.

Zlín Z.281
Two-seat primary trainer aircraft, powered by a Toma 4 piston engine.

Zlín Z.381
Two-seat primary trainer aircraft, powered by a 78 kW (105 hp) Walter Minor piston engine. Czech Air Force designation C-106.

Gomhouria Mk 1
Two-seat primary trainer aircraft, powered by a Walter Minor piston engine. Egyptian production version of the Zlín 381, built under licence in Egypt by the Heliopolis Aircraft Works.

Gomhouria Mk 2
Two-seat primary trainer aircraft, powered by a 145 hp (108 kW) Continental C-145 piston engine.
Gomhouria Mk 3
As Mk. 2, but with improved undercarriage.

Gomhouria Mk 4
Increased fuel capacity.

Gomhouria Mk 5
Similar to Mk 1, powered by Walter Minor, but with different engine mounting.

Gomhouria Mk 6
Continental O-300 engine.

Sk 25
Swedish Air Force designation of the license-built Bestmann.

== Surviving aircraft ==
Of the over 4,000 Bü 181s originally built, only about 10 examples remain. One restored example of a Gomhouria 181 MK6 in Luftwaffe markings, registration G-TPWX, is known to be airworthy and in flying condition and can regularly be seen airborne over the Welland Valley in South Leicestershire, UK, usually with a chase plane. However a good number of license-built Sk 25s fly still today, as well as some Zlin examples and an increasing number of Egyptian Gomhouria. In January 2024 a batch of around 20 Gomhourias, plus engines and spares, was delivered from Egypt to a dealer in Germany.

== Cinema ==
A Bücker Bü 181 'Bestmann' was used in the movie The Great Escape. It was flown in the movie by James Garner with Donald Pleasence as his passenger.

== Military operators ==
Algeria

- Algerian Air Force – 12 Gomhourias delivered, starting in 1962

Bulgaria

- Bulgarian Air Force

Croatia

- Air Force of the Independent State of Croatia

Czechoslovakia

- Czechoslovak Air Force – postwar
- Czechoslovak National Security Guard – postwar

Egypt

- Egyptian Air Force – 150 Gomhourias

Germany

- Luftwaffe

Hungary

- Hungarian Air Force – postwar.

Jordan

- Royal Jordanian Air Force – Gomhouria

Libya

- Libyan Air Force – two Gomhourias donated by Egypt in 1962

Morocco

- Royal Moroccan Air Force - several Gomhourias donated by Egypt in the early 1960s.

Poland

- – Postwar.

Slovakia

- Slovak Air Force (1939–1945)

Romania

- Royal Romanian Air Force

Somalia

- Somali Air Force - two Gomhourias received in 1960

Sudan

- Sudanese Air Force – four Gomhourias

Sweden

- Swedish Air Force

Switzerland

- Swiss Air Force – 1 + 6 Bü-181B-1 from German Luftwaffe landed and were interned in 1944.

Yugoslavia

- SFR Yugoslav Air Force – postwar

== Specifications ==
Data from The Concise Guide to Axis Aircraft of World War II

General characteristics

- Crew: 2
- Length: 7.85 m (25 ft 9 in)
- Wingspan: 10.6 m (34 ft 9 in)
- Height: 2.05 m (6 ft 9 in)
- Wing area: 13.5 m^{2} (145 sq ft)
- Airfoil: root: NACA 23017; tip: NACA 4412
- Empty weight: 480 kg (1,058 lb)
- Max takeoff weight: 750 kg (1,653 lb)
- Powerplant: 1 × Hirth HM 500A or 500B four-cylinder inverted air-cooled in-line piston engine, 78 kW (105 hp)
- Propellers: 2-bladed fixed-pitch propeller

Performance

- Maximum speed: 215 km/h (134 mph, 116 kn) at sea level
- Cruise speed: 195 km/h (121 mph, 105 kn)
- Never exceed speed: 440 km/h (270 mph, 240 kn)
- Range: 800 km (500 mi, 430 nmi)
- Service ceiling: 5,000 m (16,000 ft)

== See also ==
Related lists

- List of military aircraft of Germany
