= Waylandite =

Bismuth-containing mineral

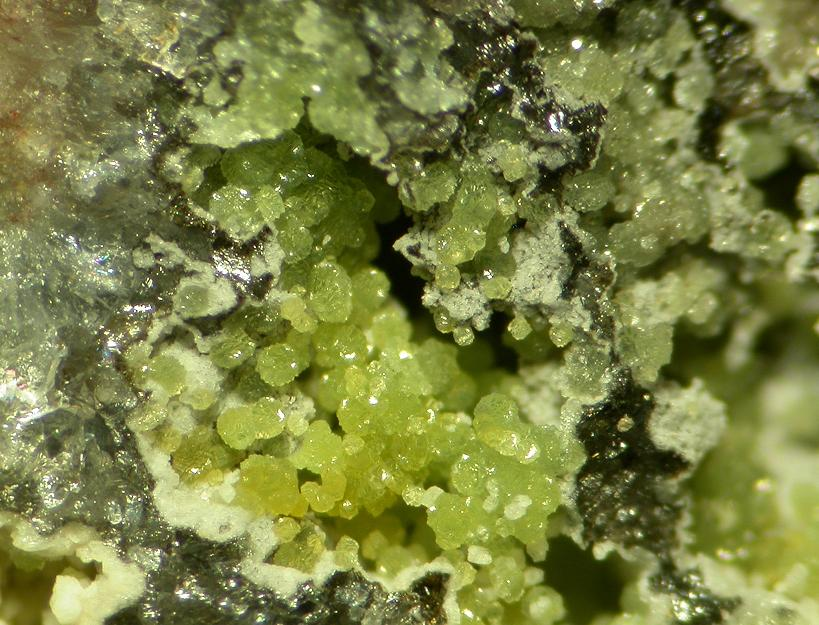

General
- Category: Minerals
- Formula: BiAl_{3}(PO_{4})_{2}(OH)_{6}
- IMA symbol: Way
- Strunz classification: 08.BL.13
- Dana classification: 41.05.12.01
- Crystal system: Trigonal
- Crystal class: Hexagonal scalenohedral H-M Symbol: 3̅m (3̅ 2/m)
- Space group: R3̅m
- Unit cell: 681.38

Identification
- Formula mass: 581.91
- Color: Colorless, white, pale blue, pale brown
- Twinning: Cyclic
- Fracture: Irregular; Uneven (when massive)
- Mohs scale hardness: 4 - 5
- Luster: Vitreous, dull
- Streak: White
- Diaphaneity: Translucent
- Specific gravity: 4.08
- Density: 4.08
- Optical properties: Uniaxial(+)
- Refractive index: n_{ω} = 1.748 n_{ε} = 1.774
- Birefringence: 0.026

Waylandite is the phosphate analogue of arsenowaylandite and the aluminum analogue of zaïrite. The mineral was approved by the IMA in 1962, and was published the same year. Waylandite was named in honor of Edgar James Wayland. It is a member of the alunite supergroup, and a member of the plumbogummite – also known as crandallite – group. So far, only two bismuth-bearing members of the alunite supergroup are known, one of which is waylandite, alongside its ferric iron analogue zaïrite.

== Properties ==
Waylandite forms tiny crystals up to 0.5 mm, but it can also occur as compact fine-grained powder. It can form pseudocubic and pseudohexagonal crystals. It mainly consists of oxygen (38.49%) and bismuth (35.91%), but otherwise contains aluminum (13.91%), phosphorus (10.65%), and a small amount of hydrogen (1.04%). Waylandite does not display any radioactive properties. In its formula, bismuth may be replaced by calcium, and phosphorus may be replaced by silicon. It is often twinned in a cyclic manner, meaning three or more individual crystals are twinned according to the same law but without the twinning planes or axes being parallel. Most minerals of the alunite group have rhombohedral symmetry, of which waylandite is no exception. The arsenate analogue of waylandite supposedly exists, however its description was incomplete. Scharm described it in 1994, and named it arsenowaylandite, however did not submit either the name or the mineral to the International Mineralogical Association.

== Synthesis ==
Scientists have been able to synthesize waylandite under hydrothermal conditions. The formation of said mineral is confirmed by SEM and IR spectroscopy. The compound forms through the formation of an intermediate crystalline phase and an amorphous phase of composition. The synthesis occurred at 200 °C and 7 MPa. After 6 hours into the process, particles with waylandite's structure, which are morphologically similar to the phase's particles, have been detected. After 12 hours, the formation of the material in amounts that can be distinguished by X-ray diffraction is reached, and after 48 hours, it ends almost completely.

== Occurrence ==
Waylandite is a secondary mineral which replaces primary bismuth minerals, and as such, it occurs with other bismuth-bearing minerals such as bismutite, bismutotantalite, bismuth, kettnerite, and other minerals in pegmatite cutting quartzite. Waylandite in its crystal form occurs in vugs and rarely in pegmatites; however in its powder form it can be found forming crusts and veinlets. It is the type locality of Wampewo hill, Uganda, but it also occurs in Ngusa and Kobokobo, Congo. In England, it can be found at Wheal Owles, Levant mine, Phoenix mines, Restormel Royal Iron Mine, and in the Gunheath China clay pit. In Germany, it can be found from a dump on the Roter Berg, in Namibia at the Rubicon mine, and in China from an undefined deposit.
