= Erla 5 =

German light sport aircraft of the 1930s

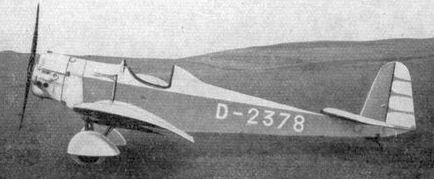
- The Erla 5 prototype, D-2378

General information
- Type: Sport aircraft
- National origin: Germany
- Manufacturer: Erla
- Designer: Franz Mehr

History
- First flight: 18 July 1932

The Erla 5 (originally, Erla Me 5) was a light, single-seat sport aircraft built in small numbers in Germany in the early 1930s. A trainer version was demonstrated on long-distance flights in 1939, but failed to attract orders.

== Design ==
The Erla 5 was designed by Franz Mehr. It was a low-wing, cantilever monoplane of conventional configuration. It had fixed, tailskid undercarriage, and a conventional tail. Power was supplied by a piston engine in the nose driving a tractor propeller. The pilot sat in an open cockpit. The wings were detachable and the aircraft was designed to be towed by road. Construction was of wood throughout, and covered in plywood except for the fabric-covered control surfaces. It was capable of aerobatics.

Contemporary publications referred to it as a Volksflugzeug ("people's aircraft" in German). The price in 1935 was 3,875 Reichsmarks (about €20,150 in 2024).

== Operational history ==
The Erla 5 prototype first flew on 18 July 1932.

Between 1 April and 20 May 1939, Friedrich Aufermann made a three-continent flight in an Erla 5, from Europe to Asia, Africa, and back again, covering around 20,000 kilometres (12,000 mi). On 2 August, Heinz Gabler set a class distance record in an Erla 5, flying from Friedrichshafen to Vännäs, 1,915 kilometres (1,190 miles).

As of 2020, one Erla 5 was still preserved in flying condition, a privately owned example in Switzerland, registered HB-SEX.

== Variants ==
- Erla Me 5
- Erla Me 5a
- Erla Me 5b
- Erla Me 5c
- Erla 5D

== Specifications (variant) ==
Data from Grey & Bridgman 1935, p.172

General characteristics

- Crew: 1
- Length: 6.20 m (20 ft 4 in)
- Wingspan: 11.00 m (36 ft 1 in)
- Height: 1.75 m (5 ft 9 in)
- Wing area: 13.7 m^{2} (147 sq ft)
- Empty weight: 220 kg (485 lb)
- Gross weight: 340 kg (750 lb)
- Powerplant: 1 × DKW liquid-cooled, two-cylinder, horizontally opposed engine, 15 kW (20 hp)

Performance

- Maximum speed: 125 km/h (78 mph, 67 kn)
- Range: 400 km (250 mi, 220 nmi)
- Service ceiling: 3,500 m (11,500 ft)
- Time to altitude: 1,000 metres (3,300 ft) in 9 minutes

== Notes ==
=== Bibliography ===
- "L'avion de sport et de tourisme D.K.W. Erla Me 5 a (Allemagne)" [The DKW Erla Me 5a sport and tourism aeroplane (Germany)]. L'Aérophile [The Aerophile] (in French). Vol. 41, no. 9. Paris: L'Aérophile. September 1933. p. 277.
- Grey, C.G.; Bridgman, Leonard (1935). Jane's All the World's Aircraft 1935. London: Sampson Low Marston.
- "Die HB-SEX fliegt wieder" [The HB-SEX is flying again]. Cockpit (in German). Schinznach-Bad: SAMedia. 16 November 2020.
- The Illustrated Encyclopedia of Aircraft. London: Aerospace Publishing.
- "Kaufkraftäquivalente historischer Beträge in deutschen Währungen" [Purchasing power equivalents of historical amounts in German currencies] (PDF) (in German). Frankfurt am Main: Deutsche Bundesbank. January 2025.
- Seifert, Karl-Dieter (2011). DKW und die Erla Me-Flugzeug [DKW and the Erla Me(hr) Aeroplanes] (in German). Erfurt: Sutton Verlag.
