= Bücker Bü 134 =

1936 German monoplane prototype

Bü 134

General information
- Type: Light sport aircraft
- Manufacturer: Bucker Flugzeugbau
- Status: Destroyed by fire 21 May 1939
- Number built: One

History
- First flight: 1936

The Bücker Bü 134 was a German single engine, high wing cabin monoplane prototype designed and built by Bücker Flugzeugbau GmbH.

== History ==
Two of the designs made by Bücker's Swedish engineer Anders J. Anderson, the Bücker Bü 134, of which only one was built, and a later development, the Bücker Bü 180 Student, could have been the result of the Volksflugzeug proposal made by the LC II, the department of the Technisches Amt of the Nazi Ministry of Aviation responsible for the development of new aircraft, even though the Bü 134 was powered by a Hirth HM 504 A motor which with 105 HP fell a bit beyond the scheme.

== Development ==
In 1936 the Bücker Flugzeugbau company developed their first monoplane design. The Bü 134 was intended as a light general aviation aircraft featuring side by side seating. The wings were foldable for convenient hangarage. Flight testing was not successful and the type was not put into series production. The single prototype aircraft, D-EQPA, was destroyed in a hangar fire on 21 May 1939.

== Specifications (Bü 134) ==
Data from Die Deutsche Luftrüstung 1933-1945

General characteristics

- Crew: 2
- Length: 6.02 m (19 ft 9 in)
- Wingspan: 6.6 m (21 ft 8 in)
- Height: 2.2 m (7 ft 3 in)
- Wing area: 12 m^{2} (130 sq ft)
- Powerplant: 2 × Hirth HM 504 4-cyl. air-cooled inverted inline piston engine, 78 kW (105 hp) each

Performance

- Maximum speed: 190 km/h (120 mph, 100 kn)

== See also ==
- Volksflugzeug

Related development

- Bü 180
- Bü 182
