= Gerner G II R =

1930s German light aircraft

Gerner G II
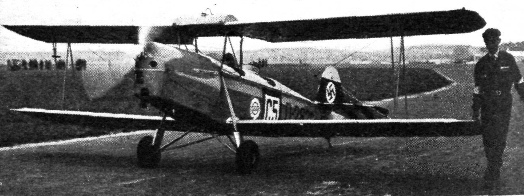

General information
- Type: Sports, touring and training
- National origin: Germany
- Manufacturer: Flugzeuge Max Gerner/Adler Werke
- Designer: Max Gerner
- Number built: 54

History
- First flight: spring 1931
- Developed from: Gerner G I

The Gerner G II or Adler-Gerner G II was a German steel framed, low power biplane, intended both for sports and training in the early 1930. Over fifty were built for clubs and private owners.

== Design and development ==
Max Gerner's G II R sport, touring and training biplane was a development of his one-off G I. The two types had low cost, easily repaired structures built from proprietary steel tubing and unswept, constant chord wings with two truss braced spars; both had lattice girder fuselages and were largely fabric covered. Both also had open, tandem cockpits, fixed undercarriages and a single engine. However, the G II R was larger, heavier and had a choice of engines which typically doubled the power. The fuselage was lengthened, mostly by increased cockpit separation, strengthened with diagonal cross members between the longerons, which placed the rear cockpit behind, rather than over, the trailing edge. These changes raised the weight by 25% and so wing area was increased by extending the span by 20%. The G II R retained the N-form interplane and cabane struts of the G I, though the former no longer leaned outwards and the upper wing was somewhat higher over the fuselage. It had two extra inter-spar trusses (six rather than four) in its lower wing, which alone carried ailerons. A newly patented method cramped, rather than welded, trusses and spars together. The G II R was easier to transport as it wings could be folded parallel to its fuselage despite the move of the fuel reservoir from behind the engine firewall to the top of the upper wings, for it now consisted of two side-by-side tanks, one on each wing.

G II Rs were powered by several different engines, some radial engines and some inverted inlines, but the prototype first flew with a 34 kW (45 hp) Salmson 9 AD, a small, nine cylinder radial. Later this first example flew with a 37 kW (50 hp) five cylinder BMW X. The Salmson was installed with its cylinder heads completely exposed but the wider spaced heads of the BMW protruded from a rounded cowling. The G-II RB and RC production aircraft had four cylinder Hirth HM 60 inverted inlines, producing 45 kW (60 hp), or the 60 kW (80 hp) Hirth 60 R racing version. Behind the nose the G I and G II R fuselages were similar, with flat sides and rounded tops, apart from the increased inter-cockpit spacing. The G I and G II RB empennages also shared the same constant chord surfaces with semicircular tips. Early G II Rs had the same single axle main undercarriage and tailskid as on the G I but this was altered on from the G II RB onwards to one where each main wheel was mounted on a V-form strut mounted on the central lower fuselage, with a bungee shock absorber from the stub axle to the upper longeron. The tailskid was replaced with a small wheel on a sprung strut.

Early in 1934 responsibility for the Gerner II R was taken over by Adler Werke, who produced cars and motorcycles; they retained Max Gerner as designer. Subsequently the aircraft were sometimes called Gerner Adlers or just Adlers.

Investigations into two serious accidents in 1933 and 1934 concluded that the G II R's deep, over-wing fuel tank could blank airflow over the tail and cause loss of control. The result was the G II RC, which had a shallower tank and revised tapered and broadened tail surfaces. Its elevators were fitted with trim tabs. The new tank moved the centre of gravity significantly rearwards and to compensate the wings were swept back at about 8° and broadened ailerons fitted.

== Operational history ==
The second G II R, the first production example, appeared at the Düsseldorf contest in 1931. Though it did not compete, it flew part of the course. The design gained aristocratic support from Hermann-Otto Graf zu Solms aus Lich. Over the next few years he bought four G II R variants and flew them competitively. Four G II Rs were entered in the 1933 Deutschland Flug (English: Germany Flight) though only two, including his, competed. In 1934 two more G II Rs took part and Solms, with his navigator W.H. Storp, won. The two machines returned for the 1935 contest. The following year he was flying a G II RC in Olympic flights and in Belgium.

In September 1934 a G II RC visited the UK at Lympne in an international competition. In a 1936 rally at Lympne, two examples visited, one with the front cockpit faired over. There is colour film of the event.

Flights like these attracted notice and the Gerner aircraft looked to sell well with clubs, justifying Adler Werke's investment. In the end only 53 production machines were completed, the majority G II RBs. Sales of the C variant were disappointing; the accidents may have played a part but there was also a move in the now nationally organised flying clubs towards aircraft with rather more powerful engines.

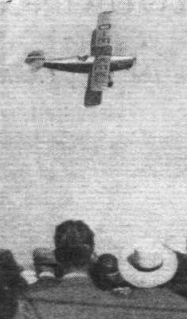
G II RC visiting Lympne, UK in 1934

== Variants ==
Gerner G II R
Single prototype with Salmson 9 Ad and BMW X radial engines.
Gerner G II RB
Hirth HM 60 or Hirth HM 60R engine. 40 built.
Adler-Gerner G II RC
Revised tank, swept wings, new undercarriage and empennage. 13 built.

== Specifications (G II RC) ==
Data from Historische Deutsche Flugzeug bis 1945

General characteristics

- Crew: Two
- Length: 6.32 m (20 ft 9 in)
- Wingspan: 7.20 m (23 ft 7 in)
- Height: 2.20 m (7 ft 3 in)
- Wing area: 12.50 m^{2} (134.5 sq ft)
- Empty weight: 295 kg (650 lb)
- Gross weight: 500 kg (1,102 lb)
- Fuel capacity: 70 L (15 imp gal; 18 US gal)
- Powerplant: 1 × Hirth HM60R four-cylinder inverted air-cooled inline, 59 kW (79 hp) 80 PS
- Propellers: 2-bladed

Performance

- Maximum speed: 175 km/h (109 mph, 94 kn)
- Cruise speed: 150 km/h (93 mph, 81 kn)
- Range: 550 km (340 mi, 300 nmi)
- Time to altitude: 4,000 m (13,000 ft) in 32 min
- Landing speed: 65 km/h (40 mph; 35 kn)

== See also ==
- Volksflugzeug
