= Gerner G.I =

General information
- Type: Sport and touring biplane
- National origin: Germany
- Manufacturer: Behrens, Gerner and Koch, Frankfurt
- Designer: Max Gerner
- Number built: 1

History
- First flight: late 1928
- Developed into: Gerner G II R

The Gerner G.I or Gerner G I, was a small, low powered, two seat biplane of steel tube construction, built in Germany in 1928. Only one was produced but the design led to the more successful Gerner G II R.

== Design and development ==
The G.I was Max Gerner's first attempt at a popular two seat light aircraft which would be both robust and cheap to buy and maintain. It therefore had a metal girder frame and fabric covering; to keep the cost of purchase and repair down, he used standard sized steel tubing, welded together. It was a small single bay biplane with equal span, strongly staggered wings which were braced with slightly outward leaning N-form interplane struts and centrally supported by a pair of similar form cabane struts from wing spars to the upper fuselage longerons. In plan the wings were rectangular, with externally connected ailerons on both planes. Each single piece wing was built around two tubular spars with six cross members in the upper planes and four below. Edges and tips were defined by finer tubes, spot welded to the main structure; the trailing edges were formed by wire.

To keep the cost low the G.I was powered by a three cylinder Anzani radial engine which produced about 26 kW (35 hp). It was air cooled, cowled with projecting cylinder heads, the upper one upright. Behind it the fuselage, also a tube steel structure, had a rectangular cross-section though with a lightly curved upper surface. The separate cockpits were in tandem with the forward one between the wings and covered over in some test flights; the rear seat, from which the aircraft was flown solo, was over the lower wing trailing edge, from where the stagger and a semicircular trailing edge cut-out assisted the pilot's upward view. The forward cockpit could be equipped with a second set of controls. The rear surfaces were straight edged, with constant chord and semicircular tips. The tailplane was mounted on top of the fuselage and the elevators had a large cut-out for rudder movement, as the latter extended downwards to the keel. The fin was wire braced to both fuselage and tailplane.

The G.I had a conventional undercarriage with two mainwheels and a tailskid. Originally each wheel was mounted on a V-shaped pair of struts and a half axle attached to a central frame. This proved weak and the half axles were therefore replaced by a conventional solid axle. Both wheels and skid had rubber shock absorbers.

== Operational history ==
The G.I was built at Frankfurt airport, given the name Frankfurt and exhibited at the 1928 International Aviation Exhibition held in Berlin during October. The first flight was towards the end of 1928 but its low cost and ruggedness failed to attract much interest. Probably as a result Gerner's two partners, Behrens and Kuch, pulled out and Gerner set up his own company, Gerner Flugzeuge, at Frankfurt in the same year. The G.I was destroyed during an air race in September 1929.

== Specifications ==
Data from Historische Deutsche Flugzeug bis 1945

General characteristics

- Crew: Two
- Length: 4.90 m (16 ft 1 in)
- Wingspan: 6.00 m (19 ft 8 in) both upper and lower wings
- Height: 1.80 m (5 ft 11 in)
- Wing area: 11.4 m^{2} (123 sq ft)
- Empty weight: 200 kg (441 lb)
- Gross weight: 400 kg (882 lb)
- Powerplant: 1 × Anzani 3 Y 3 cylinder air-cooled inverted-Y radial, 25.7 kW (34.5 hp)(35 PS)
- Propellers: 2-bladed fixed pitch Reed duralumin propeller

Performance

- Maximum speed: 150 km/h (93 mph, 81 kn)
- Range: 600 km (370 mi, 320 nmi)
- Service ceiling: 2,600 m (8,500 ft) with two occupants, 3,100 m (10,170 ft) with one
- Time to altitude: 4.8 minutes to 1,000 m (3,280 ft)
- Take-off distance: 50 m (164 ft)
- Landing distance: 40 m (131 ft)
- Landing speed: 55 km/h (34 mph)

== See also ==
- Volksflugzeug
