= Fieseler =

German aircraft manufacturer, 1930–1947

- Industry: Aircraft manufacturer
- Founded: 1930
- Defunct: 15 October 1947
- Headquarters: Kassel, Germany
- Key people: Gerhard Fieseler
- Products: Aircraft

The Gerhard Fieseler Werke (GFW) in Kassel was a German aircraft manufacturer of the 1930s and 1940s. The company is remembered mostly for its military aircraft built for the Luftwaffe during World War II.

== History ==
Gerhard Fieseler, the World War I flying ace and aerobatic champion, purchased the Segel Flugzeugbau Kassel on April 1, 1930; it was renamed the Fieseler Flugzeugbau in 1932. He had been a manager for Raab-Katzenstein, but when the company went bankrupt, Fieseler bought a sailplane factory in Kassel and quickly turned it to building sports planes. At the same time, Fieseler still custom-built sailplanes for some of Germany's most prominent designers and pilots including Wolf Hirth's "Musterle" and Robert Kronfeld's "Wien" and "Austria" (for many years the largest sailplane ever built).

In 1934, the company achieved prominence when Fieseler won the World Aerobatics Championship in an aircraft his company had built, the F2 Tiger. The highly successful F 5 followed, generally regarded as a classic among sports planes. Even greater success followed in 1936 when an aircraft of Fieseler's own design won a tender over aircraft from both Messerschmitt and Siebel for a new STOL observation and liaison aircraft for the Luftwaffe. It was designated the Fieseler Fi 156 Storch (Stork), and the company produced over 3,000 during World War II. In 1937, Fieseler also produced the Fieseler Fi 253. On April 1, 1939 the company name changed to the Gerhard Fieseler Werke GmbH.

Fieseler's other wartime production would largely consist of building other firms' aircraft under licence, including the Messerschmitt Bf 109 and Focke-Wulf Fw 190. In 1941, however, a Fieseler project for an unpiloted flying bomb (Fi 103) attracted the attention of the RLM (Reichsluftfahrtministerium-"Reich Aviation Ministry"). It went into production as the Fieseler FZG-76 (flakzielgerät, antiaircraft targeting device), better known as the V-1. The Fieseler factory was the target of many Allied air raids but continued production throughout the war. After the War, part of the factory continued in business for a few years, producing automotive components. Its most famous products, the Storch and the V1, continued to be produced by foreign companies.

== Aircraft ==
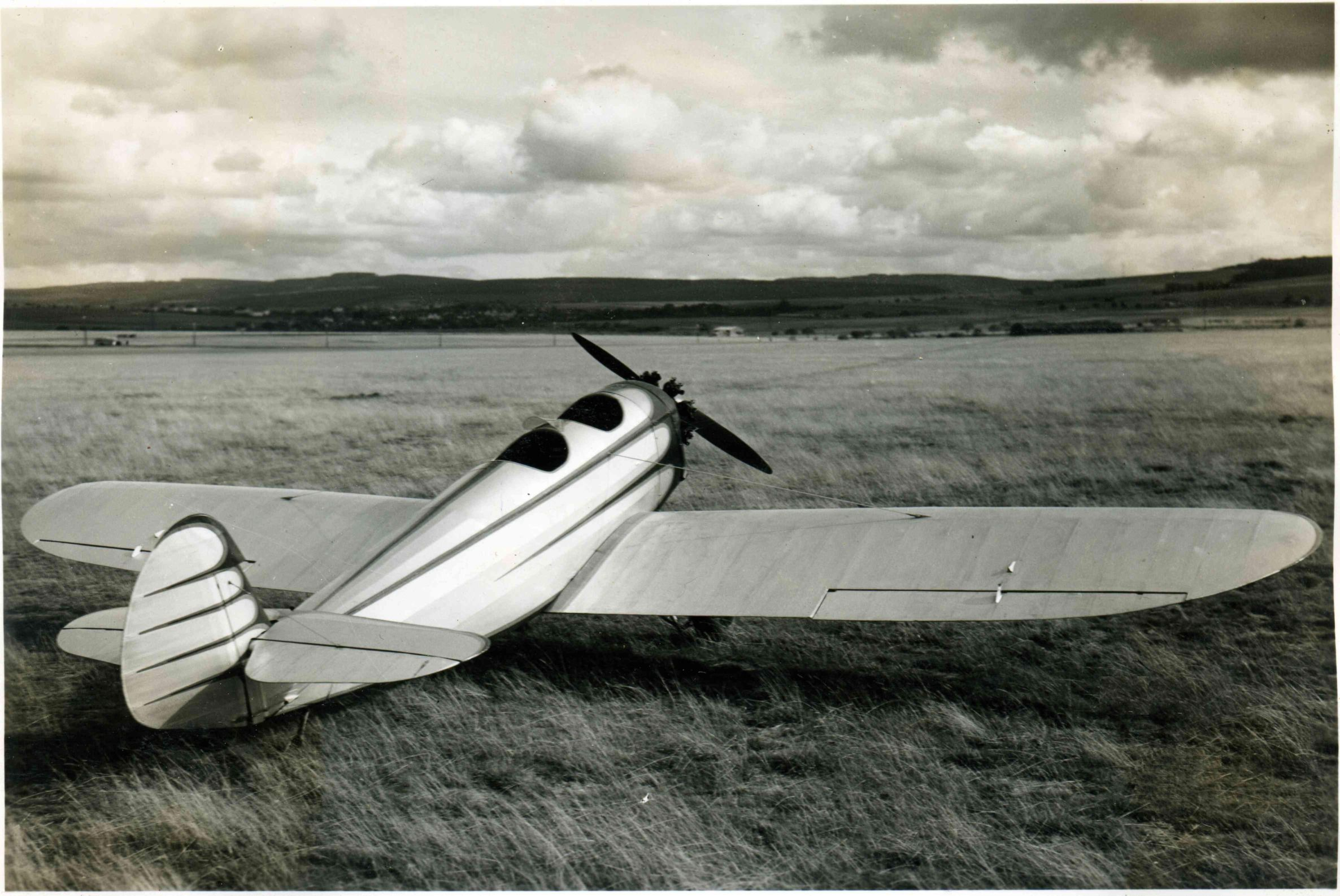
Fieseler F 4

Fieseler aircraft included:

- F2 Tiger acrobatic sportsplane, 1932
- F3 Wespe (Wasp) experimental flying wing, ca. 1931
- Fieseler F 4, two seat sports aircraft, 1932
- Fi 5, acrobatic sportsplane + trainer, 1933; previously F5
- F 6, trainer and sport aircraft, 1933
- Fi 97, competition and touring monoplane, 1934
- Fi 98, biplane dive bomber, 1936
- Fi 99, sport aircraft
- Fi 103 (V-1); RLM designation for the V-1
- Fi 103R Reichenberg, manned version of the V-1, 1944
- Fi 156 Storch (Stork), STOL reconnaissance aircraft, 1937
- Fi 157, unmanned anti-aircraft target drone, 1937
- Fi 158, research aircraft (manned version of Fi 157), 1938
- Fi 166, vertical launched jet fighter
- Fi 167, ship-borne torpedo bomber and reconnaissance biplane, 1938
- Fi 168, ground-attack aircraft, 1939
- Fi 253, sport aircraft, 1937
- Fi 333 transport (concept), 1942

== Gliders ==
- Kassel 12, training glider

== See also ==
- List of aircraft of the Luftwaffe, World War II
- List of RLM aircraft designations
- Volksflugzeug
- Stall turn - the hammerhead turn, stall turn, or Fieseler an aerobatics turn-around maneuver
- Gerhard Fieseler

== Bibliography ==
- Green, William (1986) [1970]. The Warplanes of the Third Reich. New York: Galahad Books. ISBN 0-88365-666-3.
