= Bücker Bü 182 Kornett =

German military training airplane

Bü 182 Kornett
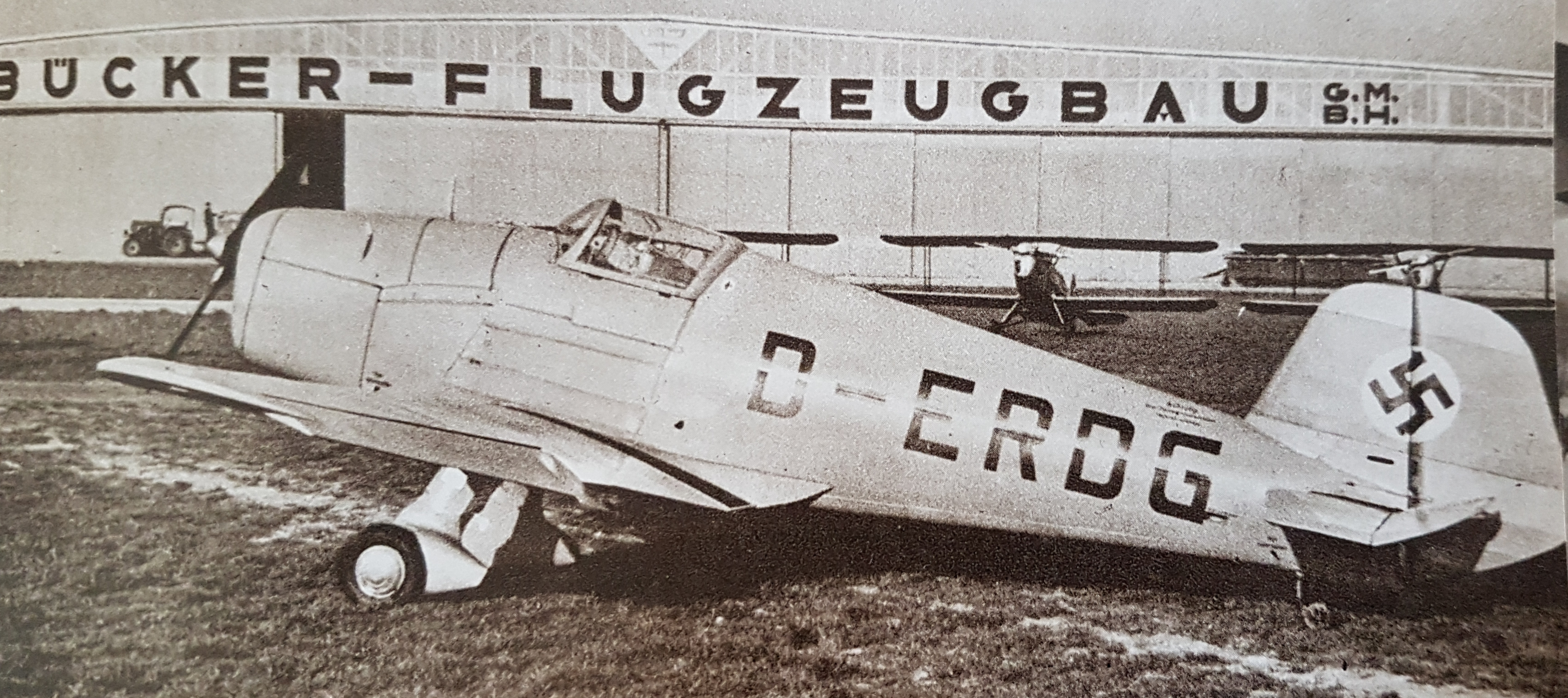

General information
- Type: Trainer
- Manufacturer: Bücker
- Number built: ca. 4

History
- First flight: November 1938

The Bücker Bü 182 Kornett ("Ensign") was a single-seat advanced trainer developed in Germany for Luftwaffe service shortly before the outbreak of World War II.

A single-seat low-wing cantilever monoplane, it was intended to give student pilots some experience with an aircraft with performance approaching that of a contemporary fighter, and could carry practice bombs. Production was shelved at the outbreak of war, and only about four examples were ever constructed, all of them destroyed around 1943.

== Development ==
The last aircraft designed by Anderson, the Bü 182 Kornett, of which only three were built, found no support in the Air Ministry of the Reich, even though it combined technical progress and low-cost. The Bü 182 Kornett was a highly innovative model, fitted with a low-priced high-performance engine, that would have made a good trainer for the Luftwaffe.

== Specifications (Bü 182C) ==
General characteristics

- Crew: One pilot
- Length: 6.67 m (21 ft 11 in)
- Wingspan: 8.60 m (28 ft 2 in)
- Height: 1.85 m (6 ft 1 in)
- Wing area: 9.8 m^{2} (105 sq ft)
- Empty weight: 315 kg (694 lb)
- Gross weight: 510 kg (1,124 lb)
- Powerplant: 1 × Bücker Bü M700 , 60 kW (80 hp)

Performance

- Maximum speed: 205 km/h (128 mph, 111 kn)
- Range: 850 km (530 mi, 460 nmi)
- Service ceiling: 5,000 m (16,400 ft)
- Rate of climb: 4.3 m/s (840 ft/min)

== See also ==
- Volksflugzeug

Related development

- Bücker Bü 134
- Bücker Bü 180

Aircraft of comparable role, configuration, and era

- Miles Master
