= Hirth HM 515 =

1940s German aircraft engine

- Type: Inline piston engine
- National origin: Germany
- Manufacturer: Hirth-Motoren GmbH, Stuttgart-Zuffenhausen
- Major applications: Siebel Si 202C Hummel
- Developed from: Hirth HM 500

The Hirth HM 515 was a four-cylinder air-cooled inverted inline engine, intended to power light aircraft of the 1940s. Due to World War II, demand for the light aircraft to be powered by the HM 515 dried up and only the Siebel Si 202C Hummel was powered by development engines before further work was abandoned.

The HM 515 closely followed the Hirth formula of Elektron (magnesium alloy) castings for the crank case and covers, with roller bearings and metered oil feeds for light weight, smooth running and low oil consumption. Only a small number were produced before the war precluded further production of the light aircraft class that the engine was intended to power. Flight testing was carried out in the Si 202Cs driving a 1.8 m (5 ft 11 in) propeller, but no production ensued.

== Specifications (HM 515) ==
Data from Flugzeug-Typenbuch. Handbuch der deutschen Luftfahrt- und Zubehör-Industrie 1944

=== General characteristics ===
- Type: 4-cylinder air-cooled inverted in-line piston engine
- Bore: 95 mm (3.74 in)
- Stroke: 105 mm (4.13 in)
- Displacement: 2.980 L (181.85 cu in)
- Length: 976 mm (38.4 in)
- Width: 334 mm (13.1 in)
- Height: 570 mm (22.4 in)
- Dry weight: 68 kg (150 lb) dry, unequipped

74 kg (163 lb) wet, equipped

=== Components ===
- Valvetrain: 1 inlet and 1 exhaust under-valve per cylinder driven by pushrods and rockers
- Fuel system: 1x Pallas MF 35 carburetor
- Fuel type: 80 Octane
- Oil system: dry sump, pressure feed with scavenge
- Cooling system: air-cooled

=== Performance ===
- Power output:

- 65 PS (64 hp; 48 kW) at 2,100 rpm for take-off
- 60 PS (59 hp; 44 kW) at 2,040 rpm (high power rating) at sea level
- 55 PS (54 hp; 40 kW) at 1,990 rpm (max. continuous) at sea level

- Specific power: 21.8 PS/L (0.35 hp/cu in; 16.03 kW/L)
- Compression ratio: 6.2:1
- Specific fuel consumption: 0.205 kg/PSh (0.458 lb/(hp⋅h); 0.279 kg/kWh) at max continuous
- Oil consumption: 0.001–0.003 kg/PSh (0.002–0.007 lb/(hp⋅h); 0.001–0.004 kg/kWh) at max continuous
- Power-to-weight ratio: 0.96 PS/kg (0.43 hp/lb; 0.71 kW/kg)
- B.M.E.P.: 9.30 atm (9.42 bar; 136.7 psi)
