= Fieseler Fi 168 =

Failed German ground attack aircraft

Fi 168
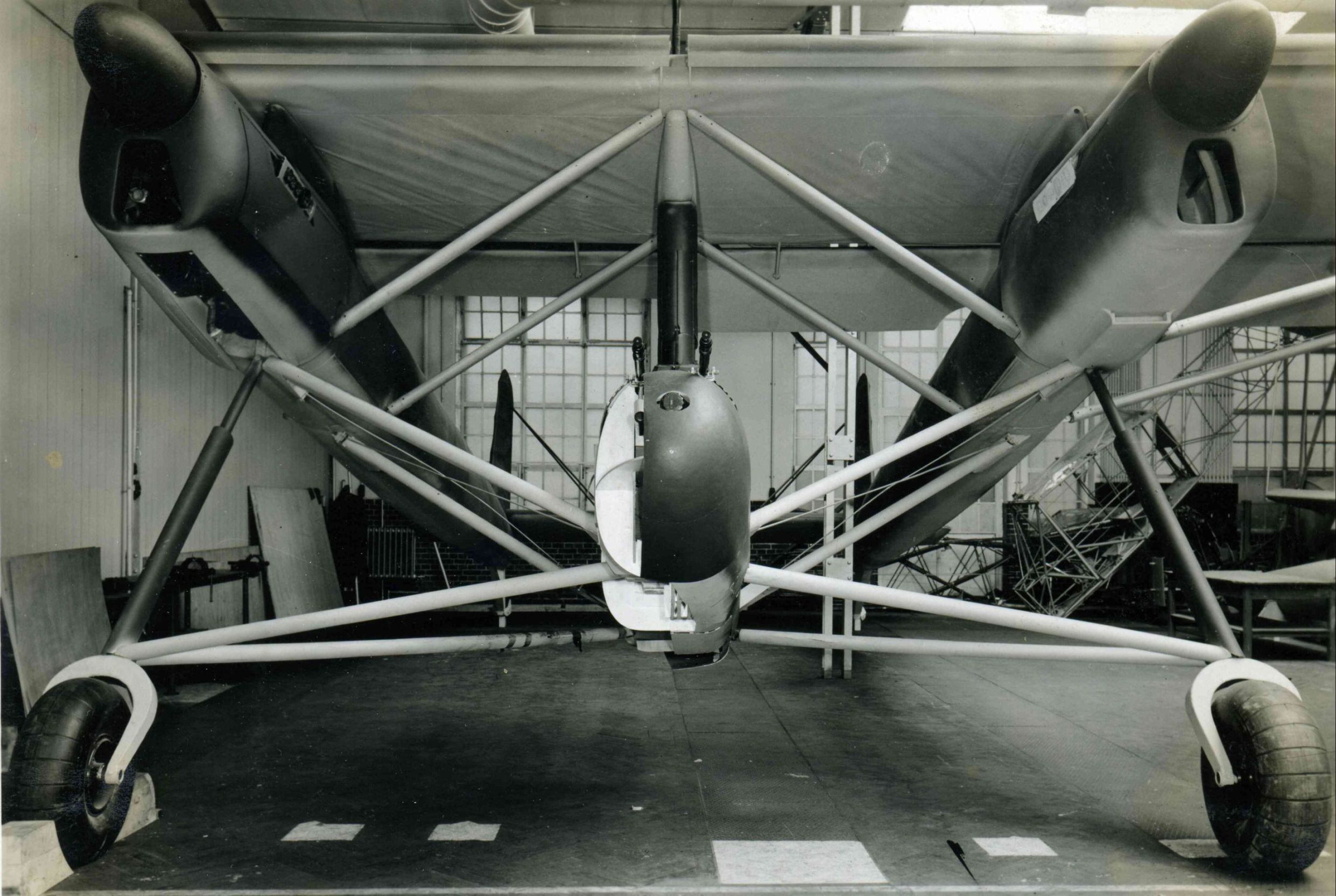
- The Fieseler Fi 168, described by a German engineer as a "tank destroyer"

General information
- Type: Ground attack aircraft
- National origin: Germany
- Manufacturer: Fieseler
- Designer: Frederik Kassel

The Fieseler Fi 168 was a projected German ground attack aircraft designed in 1938 by Frederik Kassel, who created the aircraft after a request from the Technisches Amt (Technical Department) of the RLM Reichsluftfahrtministerium - (German aviation ministry).

The two-engine aircraft was a strut-braced high-wing monoplane with two tail-booms and a narrow fuselage pod carried by struts under the centre-section, and was designed to operate in areas featuring rough terrain, and boasted two rigidly mounted forward-facing machine guns. The former development director Erich Bachem described the Fi 168 as a flying "tank destroyer".

The project was discontinued at the direction of the RLM in September 1939.

== Bibliography ==
Media related to Fieseler Fi 168 at Wikimedia Commons Kössler, Karl (April 1992). "Le Fieseler Fi 168 dont vous n'avez jamais entendu parler!" [The Fieseler Fi 168 that You've Never Heard Of!]. Le Fana de l'Aviation (in French) (269): 14–15. ISSN 0757-4169.
