= Bücker Flugzeugbau =

Defunct German aircraft manufacturing company

- Founded: 1932
- Founder: Carl Bücker
- Defunct: 1945
- Fate: Ceased trading
- Headquarters: Rangsdorf, Brandenburg, Germany
- Products: Aircraft

Bücker-Flugzeugbau GmbH was a German aircraft manufacturer founded in 1932. It was most notable for Its highly regarded sports planes which went on to be used as trainers by the Luftwaffe during World War II.

== History ==
The company was founded by Carl Bücker, who had served as an officer in the Imperial German Navy during World War I and then spent some years in Sweden establishing the Svenska Aero factory. With the sale of this business at the end of 1932, Bücker returned to his native Germany where he opened his new factory in Johannisthal, Berlin in 1934, but moved to a new built bigger factory in Rangsdorf in 1935.

Bücker's three great successes were the Bücker Bü 131 Jungmann (1934), the Bü 133 Jungmeister (1936) and the Bü 181 Bestmann (1939). As well as these, the company built designs from several other manufacturers under licence, including the Focke-Wulf Fw 44, the DFS 230, and components for the Focke-Wulf Fw 190, Junkers Ju 87, and Henschel Hs 293.

During the war, forced labour was used at the Bücker works. Up to 500 prisoners from the Soviet Union lived in a nearby prison camp under bad conditions; there were also forced labourers from France, Italy, and other countries.

At the end of World War II, the company’s premises fell into the Soviet occupation zone, and were seized. The company was then broken up. The Soviet army used the premises for aviation maintenance until their withdrawal from Germany in the 1990s.

The Bü 181 continued to be built in Czechoslovakia and Egypt after the war.

== List of aircraft ==
- Bücker Bü 131 Jungmann (Young Man) (1934) single-engine two-seat trainer, biplane
- Bücker Bü 133 Jungmeister (Young Champion) (1935) single-engine one-seat advanced trainer/aerobatic, biplane
- Bücker Bü 134 monoplane (prototype)
- Bücker Bü 180 Student (1937) single-engine two-seat trainer, low-wing monoplane
- Bücker Bü 181 Bestmann (Bestman) (1939) single-engine two-seat trainer/utility, low-wing monoplane
- Bücker Bü 182 Kornett

== See also ==
- List of aircraft manufacturers
- List of RLM aircraft designations
- Volksflugzeug
