= Fieseler F 6 =

F 6

General information
- Type: Trainer and sport
- National origin: Germany
- Manufacturer: Fieseler

The Fieseler F 6 was a two-seat trainer and sport aircraft developed, built, and flown at the Fieseler Aircraft Works in Kassel.

== History ==
The two-seater sports aircraft Fieseler Fi 6 was also equipped with the powerful Hirth Motor HM.60R, which had already given the Fieseler F 5 R speed and agility.

As a further development of the Fieseler F 5 R, the aircraft featured additional optimizations to the wing shape, resulting in improved flight characteristics and an even more elegant silhouette. A prototype from Fieseler-Werke was registered in the mid-1930s under the factory designation D-EBIX.

== See also ==
- List of aircraft
