= Klemm Kl 105 =

1930s German monoplane

Kl 105

General information
- Type: Sports aircraft
- National origin: Germany
- Manufacturer: Klemm

History
- First flight: 1938

The Klemm Kl 105 was a two-seat sport aircraft developed in Germany in 1938. It was a low-wing cantilever monoplane of conventional design with fixed, tailskid undercarriage, and side-by-side seating for two within an enclosed cockpit. Construction throughout was of wood, with the fuselage built using a new semi-monocoque technique which Klemm patented. Plans to produce the design in series were abandoned with the outbreak of the Second World War.

== Development ==
In January 1937, the individual in charge of developing new aircraft at the Reichsluftfahrtministerium, Major Werner Junck, advised several aircraft maker that they would not be receiving any more contracts for the development of military aircraft. Instead they should focus on creating a Volksflugzeug. This led to the development of the Klemm Kl 105 along with other aircraft, such as the Fi 253, Si 202, Bü 180, and the Go 150.

== Specifications ==
General characteristics

- Crew: One pilot
- Capacity: 1 passenger
- Length: 7.35 m (24 ft 1 in)
- Wingspan: 10.92 m (35 ft 10 in)
- Height: 2.00 m (6 ft 7 in)
- Wing area: 15.00 m^{2} (161 sq ft)
- Empty weight: 340 kg (750 lb)
- Gross weight: 560 kg (1,230 lb)
- Powerplant: 1 × Zündapp Z 9 , 37 kW (50 hp)

Performance

- Maximum speed: 150 km/h (90 mph, 78 kn)
- Range: 500 km (310 mi, 270 nmi)
- Service ceiling: 3,000 m (9,800 ft)
- Rate of climb: 1.8 m/s (350 ft/min)
