= Hirth HM 500 =

1930s German aircraft engine

HM 500
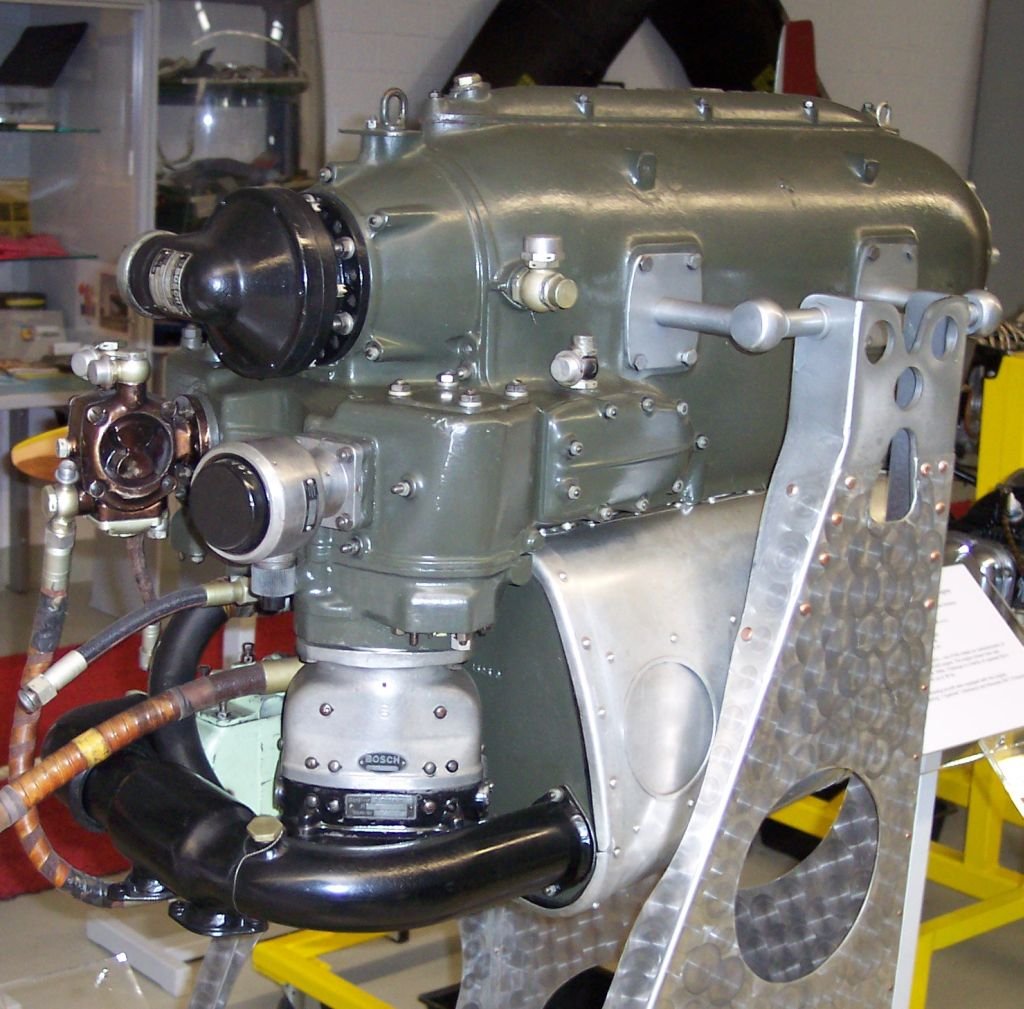
- Hirth HM 500
- Type: Inline piston engine
- National origin: Germany
- Manufacturer: Hirth
- First run: 1938
- Major applications: Bücker Bü 181
- Developed from: Hirth HM 504

The Hirth HM 500 was a German four-cylinder air-cooled inverted inline engine developed from the Hirth HM 504 in 1938. Although developing the same output of the HM 504 (105 hp) and keeping the same capacity and bore, the HM 500 was a very different engine; the new HM 500 had a one-piece "closed" crankcase for simplified manufacture. The new cooling system reduced cylinder temperatures considerably (15 °C less), and the fuel consumption was also reduced. The HM 500 carried a twin-magneto instead of the two separate magnetos as on the old HM 504. All these changes made that the HM 500 resulted a 12% lighter than the HM 504 and the front surface 37% less than the previous HM 504.

Otherwise the HM 500 continued the typical Hirth use of built-up crankshafts and roller-bearings for crankshaft & connecting rods (Hirth patents) as well as magnesium-alloy crankcases which made Hirth engines so popular in the 1930s.

Due to low fuel consumption and excellent reliability, the HM 500 was chosen as the powerplant for the Bücker Bü 181.

== Applications ==
- Bücker Bü 181

== Specifications (HM 500A) ==
=== General characteristics ===
- Type: 4-cylinder air-cooled inverted inline
- Bore: 105 mm (4.134 in.)
- Stroke: 115 mm (4.528 in.)
- Displacement: 3983 cm^{3} (243.1 cuin)
- Length: 978 mm
- Width: 420 mm
- Height: 665 mm
- Dry weight: 91.50 kg (core)

=== Components ===
- Valvetrain: 1 inlet and 1 exhaust valve per cylinder
- Fuel type: A3 (80 octane)
- Cooling system: air

=== Performance ===
- Power output: 105 hp at 2500 RPM
- Compression ratio: 6:1
- Fuel consumption: 210 -230 gr /PSh
- Oil consumption: 3g /PSh

== See also ==
Comparable engines

- Alfa Romeo 110
- Argus As 8
- Blackburn Cirrus Minor
- de Havilland Gipsy Minor
- Elizalde Tigre IV
- Menasco C4
- Walter Minor

Related lists

- List of aircraft engines
