= Fieseler Fi 253 =

1937 German light civilian aircraft

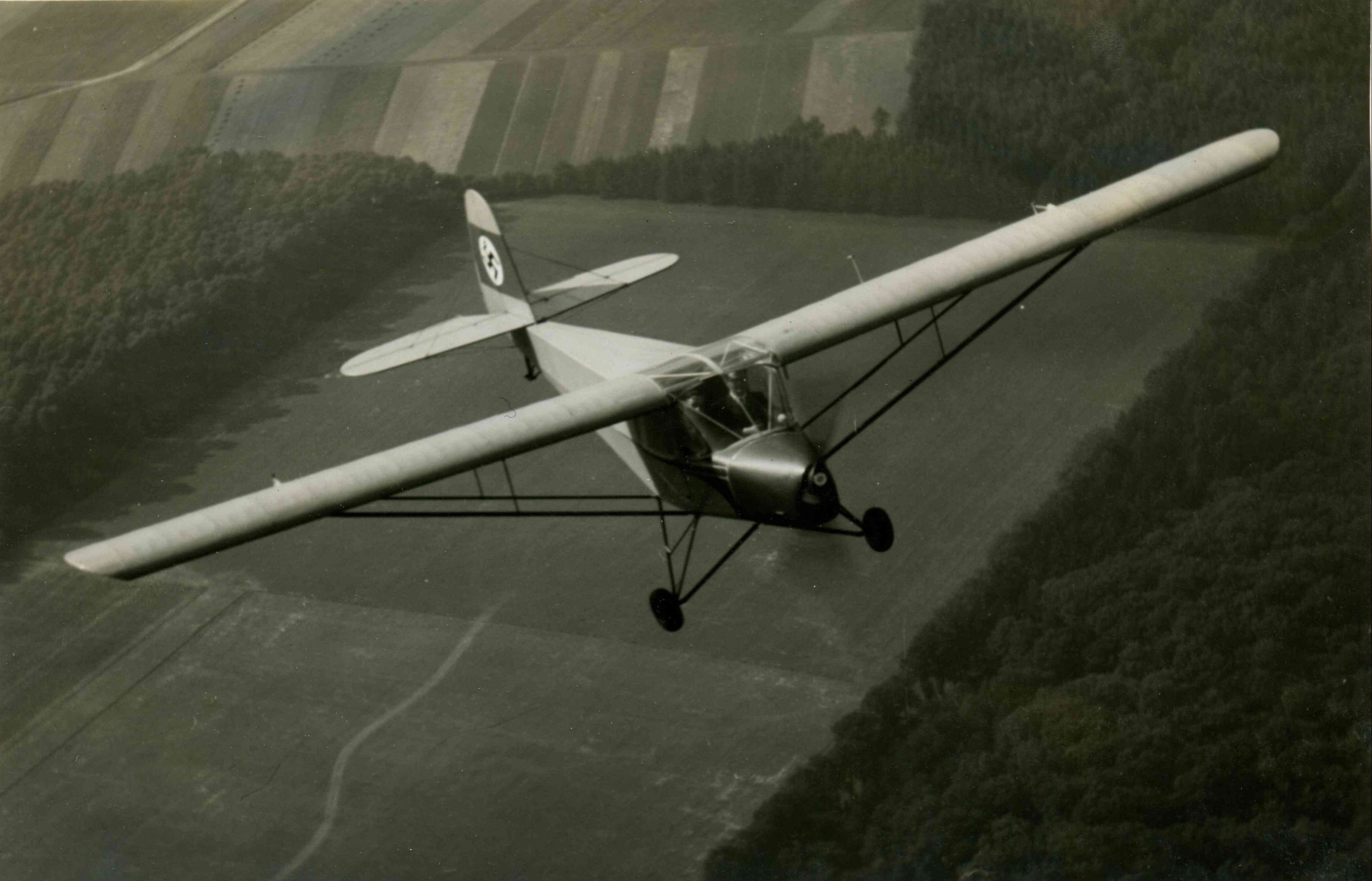
- The Fi 253 Spatz prototype

General information
- Type: Sports aircraft
- National origin: Germany
- Manufacturer: Fieseler
- Number built: 6

History
- First flight: November 4, 1937

The Fieseler Fi 253 Spatz, (English: Sparrow), was a light civilian aircraft, manufactured by the German company Fieseler in Nazi Germany. Only six units were produced, however, due to the Second World War.

== Development ==
In January 1937, the individual in charge of developing new aircraft at the Reichsluftfahrtministerium, Major Werner Junck, advised several aircraft maker that they would not be receiving any more contracts for the development of military aircraft. Instead they should focus on creating a Volksflugzeug. This led to the development of the Fi 253 along with other aircraft, such as the Klemm Kl 105, Si 202, Bü 180, and the Go 150.

== Specifications ==
Data from https://www.wehrmacht-history.com/luftwaffe/prototypes/fieseler-fi-253-prototype.html

General characteristics

- Crew: 1
- Capacity: 1 passenger, 205kg
- Length: 7.25 m (23 ft 9 in)
- Wingspan: 11 m (36 ft 1 in)
- Height: 2.3 m (7 ft 7 in)
- Wing area: 16 m^{2} (170 sq ft)
- Empty weight: 295 kg (650 lb)
- Max takeoff weight: 500 kg (1,102 lb)
- Powerplant: 1 × Zündapp Z 9-092 inline four-cylinder, 37 kW (50 hp)

Performance

- Maximum speed: 140 km/h (87 mph, 76 kn)
- Range: 450 km (280 mi, 240 nmi)
