= Zündapp 9-092 =

9-092
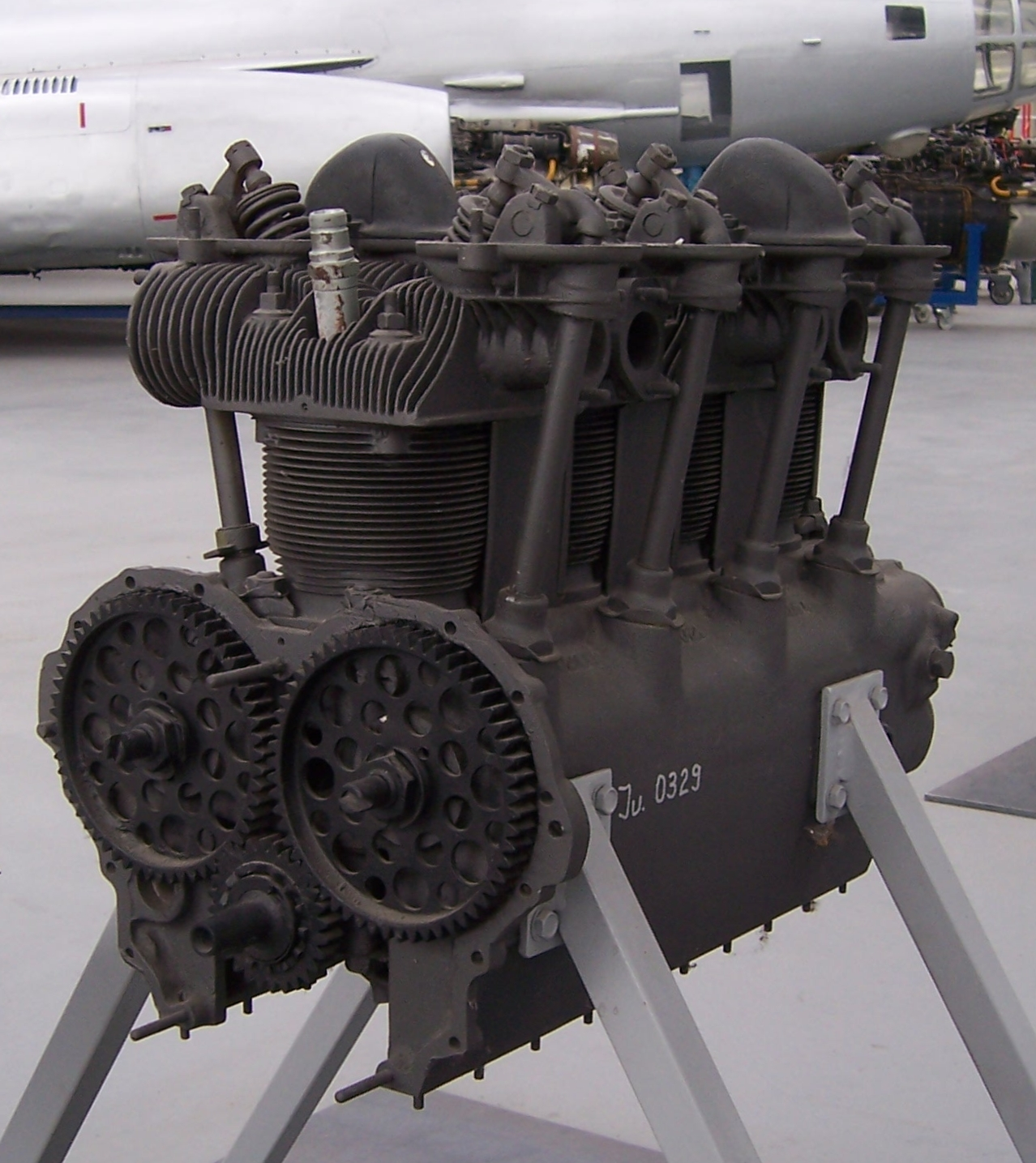
- Rear view of the 9-092 engine on display at the Technikmuseum Dessau (note:displayed upside-down)
- Type: Air-cooled inverted inline-four engine
- Manufacturer: Zündapp
- First run: 1938
- Major applications: Gotha Go 150, Siebel Si 202B
- Number built: c. 200
- Developed from: Zündapp Z 9-090

The Zündapp 9–092 or Z 92 was a German four-cylinder, air-cooled, inline aero engine made by Zündapp and used in light aircraft of the late-1930s.

== Design and development ==
The engine was developed from the smaller Zündapp 9-090. This inverted engine featured dual gear-driven camshafts with the valve rocker cover acting as the oil tank. It featured a single Bosch magneto ignition system. A total of approximately 200 engines were produced.

== Applications ==
- Braunschweig LF-1 Zaunkönig
- Bücker Bü 180
- Fieseler Fi 253
- Gotha Go 150
- Klemm Kl 105
- Möller Stürmer
- Siebel Si 202

== Engines on display ==
- Preserved examples of the 9-092 engine are on public display at the Deutsches Museum, Munich and Technikmuseum Dessau.

== Specifications ==
Data from Flugzeug-Typenbuch. Handbuch der deutschen Luftfahrt- und Zubehör-Industrie 1944

=== General characteristics ===
- Type: Four-cylinder air-cooled inverted inline piston aircraft engine
- Bore: 85 mm (3.35 in)
- Stroke: 88 mm (3.46 in)
- Displacement: 2 L (122.05 cu in)
- Length: 800 mm (31.5 in)
- Width: 350 mm (13.8 in)
- Height: 560 mm (22.0 in)
- Dry weight: 60 kg (132 lb) dry, unequipped

65 kg (143 lb) wet, equipped

=== Components ===
- Valvetrain: 1 inlet and 1 exhaust under-head valve per cylinder driven by pushrods and rockers
- Fuel system: Downdraught carburettor
- Fuel type: 78 Octane gasoline
- Oil system: pressure feed at 0.2–0.35 atm (2.9–5.1 psi; 0.20–0.35 bar)
- Cooling system: Air-cooled

=== Performance ===
- Power output:

- 50 PS (49 hp; 37 kW) at 2,300 rpm (30 minutes) at sea level
- 45 PS (44 hp; 33 kW) at 2,225 rpm (max. continuous) at sea level
- 40 PS (39 hp; 29 kW) at 2,150 rpm (cruise) at sea level

- Specific power: 25 PS/L (0.40 hp/cu in; 18.39 kW/L)
- Compression ratio: 6.2:1
- Specific fuel consumption: 0.220 kg/PSh (0.492 lb/(hp⋅h); 0.299 kg/kWh) at max continuous
- Power-to-weight ratio: 0.833 PS/kg (0.373 hp/lb; 0.613 kW/kg)
- B.M.E.P.: 9.8 atm (9.9 bar; 144 psi)

== See also ==
Comparable engines

- de Havilland Gipsy Minor
- ERCO I-L 116
- Walter Mikron

Related lists

- List of aircraft engines
