= Erla Ironworks =

Coordinates: 50°31′13″N 12°47′10″E

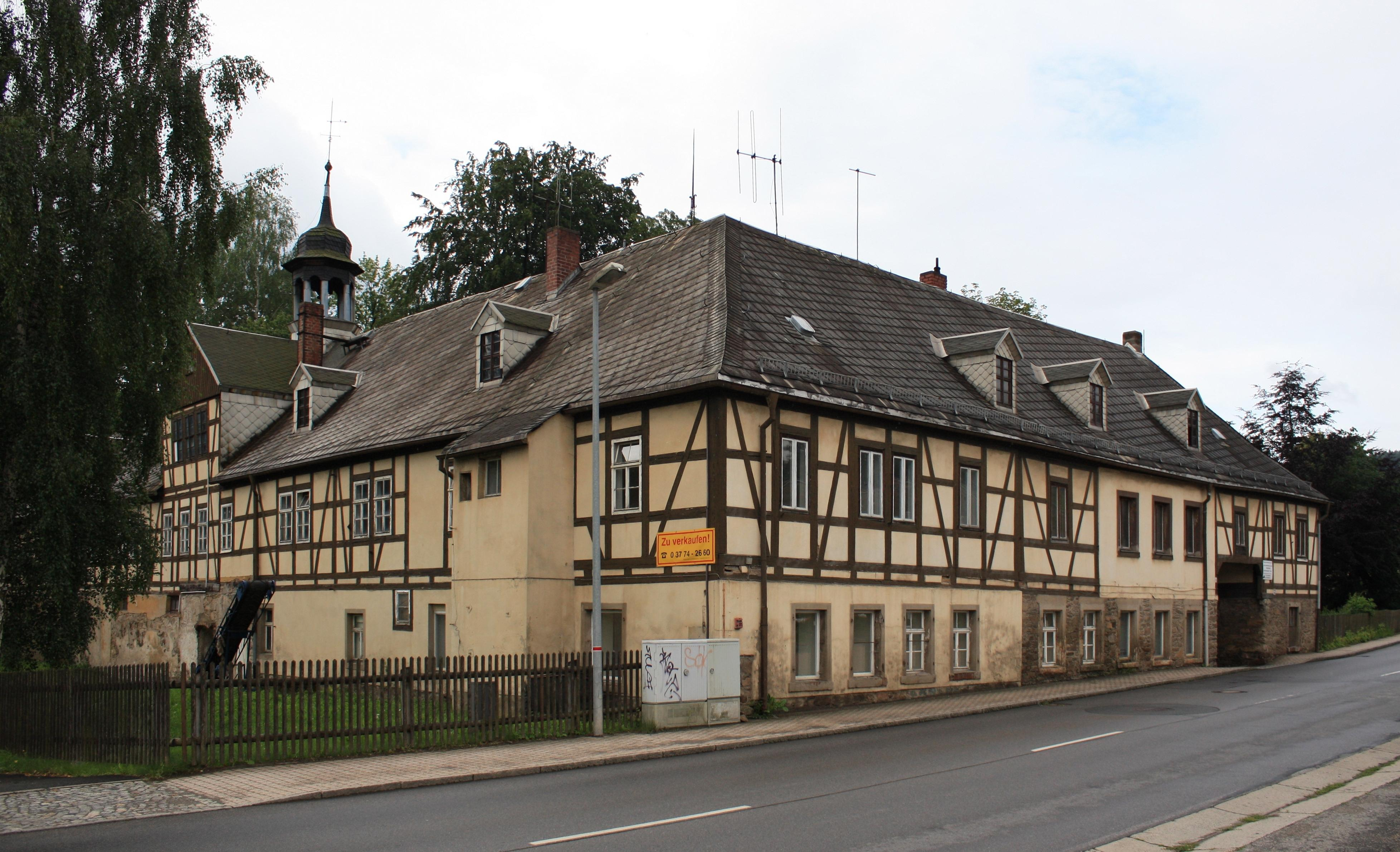
The Herrenhof of the old hammer mill

The Erla Ironworks (German: Eisenwerk Erla) has its origins in one of the oldest hammer mills in the Upper Ore Mountains, which was first recorded in 1380 as the Hammer in der Erl, making the ironworks the oldest existing business in the German state of Saxony.

== Location ==
The ironworks lies in the valley of the Schwarzwasser river in the village of Erla in the borough of Schwarzenberg, immediately next to the Staatsstraße 272 and the railway line from Schwarzenberg to Johanngeorgenstadt, opened in 1883.

== History ==
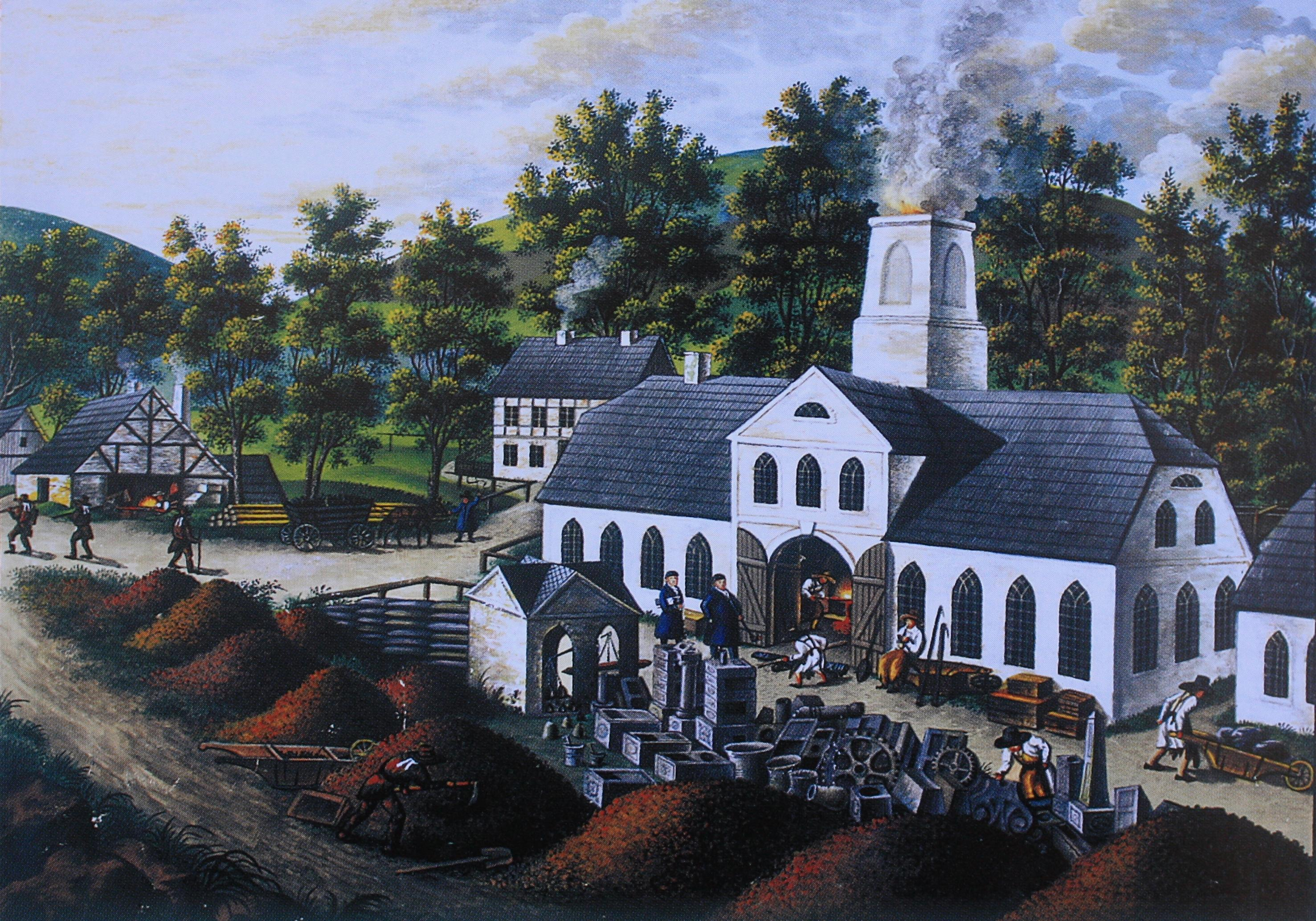
The Erla hammer mill in the mid-19th century

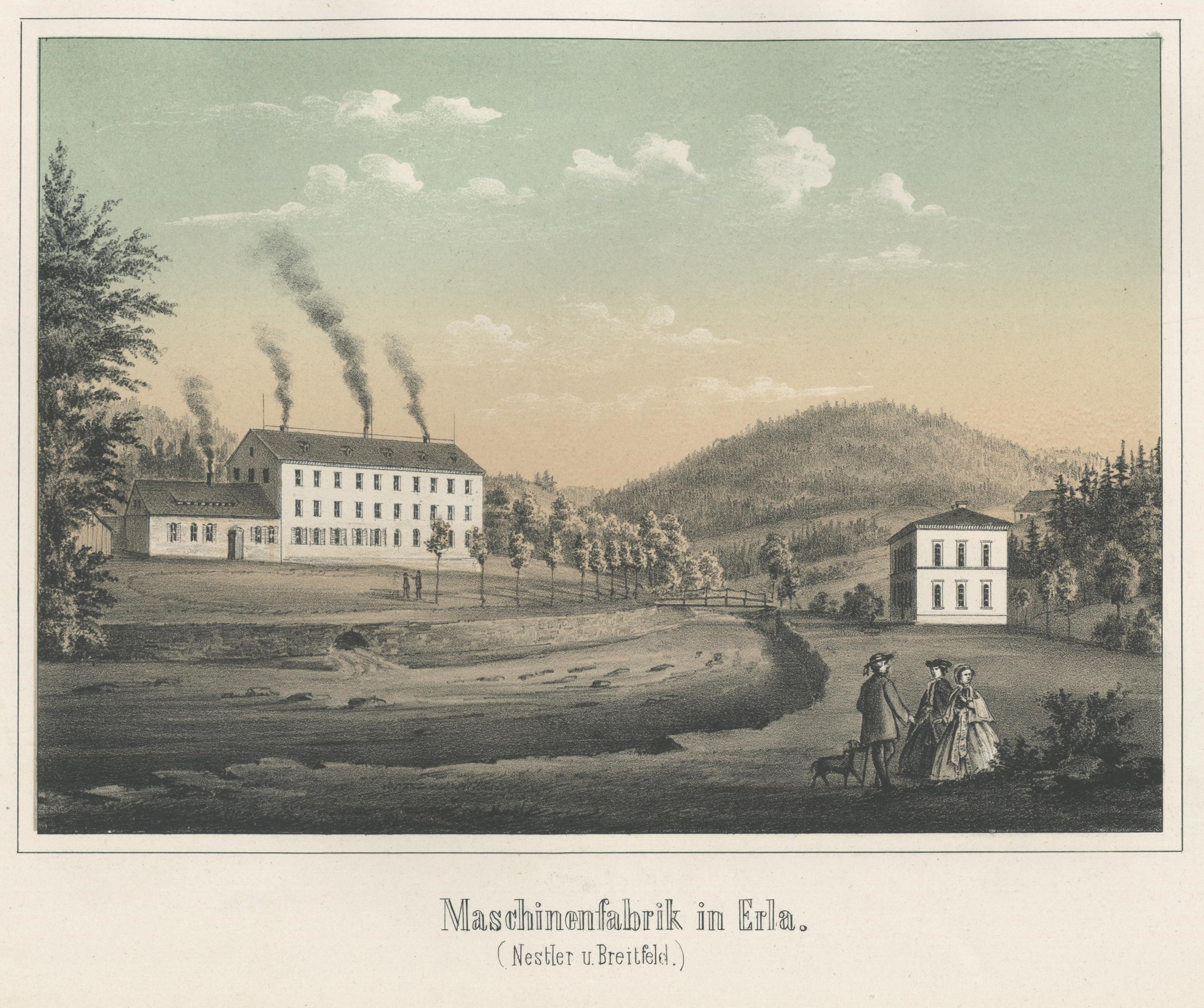
Factory of the Erla Ironworks, c. 1840

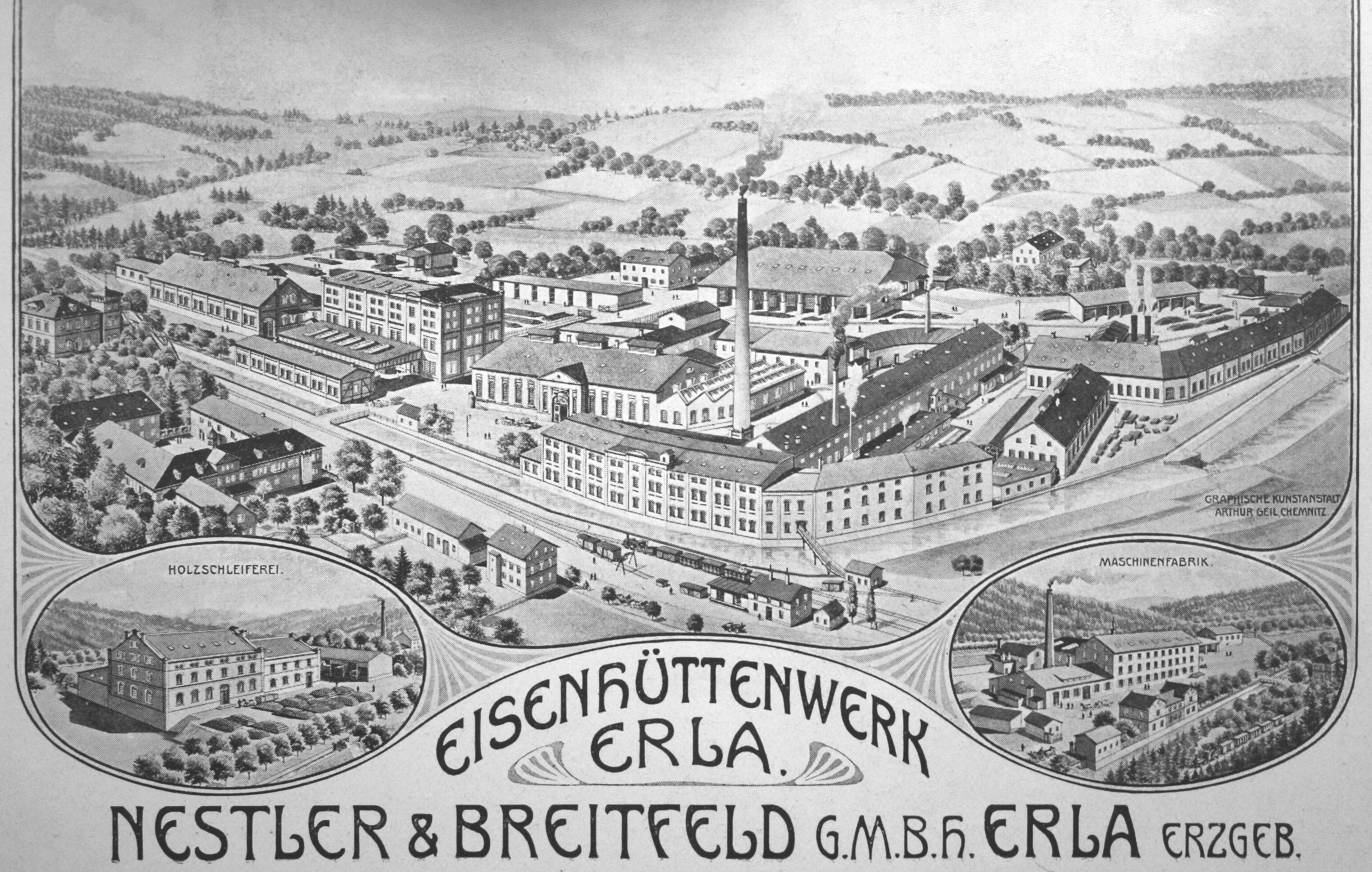
Erla Iron Smeltery c. 1910

The emergence of the hammer mill is closely connected to the discovery of haematite on the Rothenberg mountain, which led to the establishment of the most important iron ore mine in the Kingdom of Saxony in the mid-19th century. The Erla Hammer Mill (Erlaer Hammer) was first mentioned in 1380 as the Hammer in der Erl, making the Erla Ironworks the oldest surviving business in Saxony.

Among its earliest owners must have been members of the noble family of Berkas von der Duba. In 1430, William of Boskowitz from Bohemia is named as the owner of the mill. In 1434 it was purchased by von Tettau of Schwarzenberg. His successor, George William of Tettau rented the mill in der Erl in 1517 to hammersmith, Oswald Flemigk. Other owners were the hammer mill lords, Gregor Arnoldt (1550), Nikolaus Klinger and his son-in-law, Hans Rüdiger of Sachsenfeld (1626).

On 7 August 1650, the widower, Rosina Rüdiger, sold the debt-ridden hammer mill to Schwarzenberg town judge, Friedrich Röhling and her son, Hans Rüdiger. It was quickly rebuilt after its destruction in the Thirty Years' War, but destroyed again in August 1661 by a great flood. In 1806, mining commissioner (Bergkommissionsrat), Karl Heinrich Nitzsche from Obermittweida, bought the mill from the Reinhold brothers. He employed hammersmiths, hammer boys, carpenters and charcoal burners in two workshops. In 1836 the mill went into the hands of Carl Gotthilf Nestler from Wittigsthal and his son-in-law, Eduard Wilhelm Breitfeld, from Rothenhammer-Unterwiesenthal. The firm of Nestler & Breitfeld, which also owned the Siegelhof in Pöhla and the Arnoldshammer in Rittersgrün, thus expanded their holdings and, under its ownership, the hammer mill in Erla boomed. Around 1840, a steel rolling mill was added and the latest iron ore extraction techniques were introduced. Nestler & Breitfeld had an engineering works added by 1843, run by the Englishman, John Payne. From 1850, more buildings were erected and old facilities had to be renovated. Before a great fire in 1870 the Erla Hammer Mill consisted of 27 individual buildings, of which many were totally destroyed by the fire. By 1879, the most important parts of the ironworks had been rebuilt and even new residential quarters were built. But the furnaces were not reactivated; pig iron for the manufacture of ironmongery was now brought in from Westphalia and Silesia. The products from the factories in Erla were now iron and steel castings, machines, household tableware and black plate. The construction of the Johanngeorgenstadt–Schwarzenberg railway by the Royal Saxon State Railways in 1883, which included the Erla Halt (Haltestelle Erla), facilitated the delivery of raw materials and dispatch of its end products. The factory owners had now specialised in machines for the paper industry. At the top was the die Nestler & Breitfeld GmbH. This later became an Aktiengesellschaft or joint stock company. In 1928, its majority shareholders became Jørgen Skafte Rasmussen, owner of the Zschopauer Motorenwerke (DKW). During the Great Depression and a flood in 1931 iron production came to a stand still. At Nestler & Breitfeld, the parts for DKW engines were produced.

== Literature ==
- Um Aue, Schwarzenberg und Johanngeorgenstadt. Edition no. 1 Akademie-Verlag Berlin, Berlin 1972 (Werte unserer Heimat. Vol. 20).
- Manfred Blechschmidt: 600 Jahre Eisen in Erla. Vom Erlahammer zum volkseigenen Eisenwerk. in: Rat der Gemeinde Erla (ed.): Zwischen Magnetenberg und Schwarzwasser. Acht Jahrhunderte Erla und Crandorf. Erla, 1989 (Digitalisat; PDF; 484 kB)
- Förderverein Montanregion Erzgebirge e.V. (publ.): Studie zur Festlegung und Definition der Welterbebereiche und Pufferzonen im Raum Schwarzenberg im Rahmen des Projekts Montanregion Erzgebirge. Freiberg, 2012 (Digitalisat; pdf; 4,9 MB)
