= Siebel Si 202 Hummel =

Type of aircraft

Si 202 Hummel
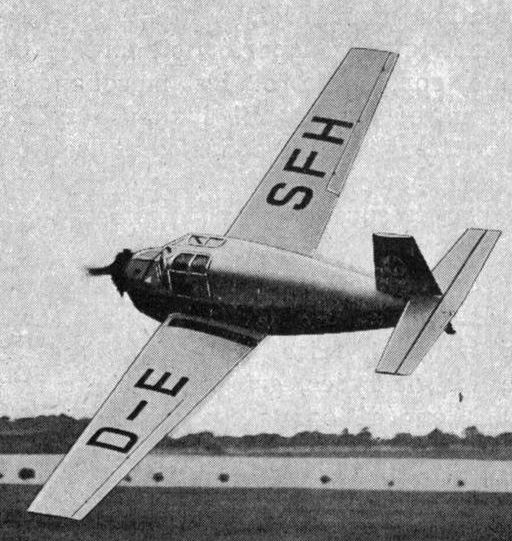

General information
- Type: sports and trainer
- National origin: Germany
- Manufacturer: Siebel Flugzeugwerke Halle K.G.
- Designer: F. Fechner
- Number built: 66

History
- First flight: May 1938

The Siebel Si 202 Hummel ("Bumble-bee") was a German light sportsplane of the late 1930s. It was an angular low-wing monoplane, which could be powered by a variety of small engines.

== Design and development ==
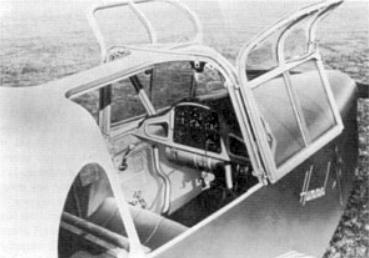
Siebel Si 202 cockpit photo from L'Aerophile July 1939

In January 1937, the individual in charge of developing new aircraft at the Reichsluftfahrtministerium, Major Werner Junck, advised several aircraft maker that they would not be receiving any more contracts for the development of military aircraft. Instead they should focus on creating a Volksflugzeug. This led to the development of the Si 202 along with other aircraft, such as the Kl 105, Fi 253, Bü 180, and the Go 150.

The Hummel was a small single-engined low-wing cantilever monoplane with side-by-side seating for two, designed to accept a variety of low powered engines of either radial or in-line arrangement. It was aimed at the sports and club market. Most variants had sharply clipped wing and tail surfaces, giving the Hummel an attractively angular appearance compared with its contemporaries.

Structurally, the Hummel was a wooden aircraft. The wing were built around a wooden monospar with plywood covered leading edges and ailerons, with fabric covering elsewhere. The fuselage was a plywood covered wooden structure, as were the fixed tail surfaces, rudder and elevators being fabric covered. The horizontal tail surfaces were set noticeably aft of the rudder, rather like the more recent Piper PA-28. The enclosed cabin had dual controls, a single central control column being shared via horizontal extensions. There was a generous baggage space behind the seats. The fixed undercarriage had main wheels on split axles, with low pressure tyres and brakes. There was a sprung tailskid.

The first prototype D-ESFH had a nine-cylinder radial Salmson 9Ad motor of 36 kW (45 hp), and began flight testing in May 1938. For a light aircraft, there was a surprising number of prototypes (at least seven), mostly exploring different engine installations. The engines of the three main variants are given below; the third prototype used a 46 kW (62 hp) Walter Mikron II four-cylinder in-line air-cooled motor.

On 2 February 1939 a Si 202b set a new altitude record for light aircraft carrying two people with an engine of 2 litre capacity, at 5,982 metres (19,626 ft). On 6 February the same pilot set another record with just the pilot aboard, reaching 7,043 m (23,107 ft).

At least 17 Hummels, including the prototypes, appeared on the German civil list before the start of World War II and 8 more on the Hungarian list. A total of 66 Hummels of all variants had been completed by the time production ended in March 1941.

== Variants ==
from

- Si 202a: 36 kW (45 hp) nine-cylinder radial Salmson 9Ad
- Si 202b: 41 kW (55 hp) four-cylinder in-line air-cooled Zundapp 9-092
- Si 202c: 45 kW (60 hp) four-cylinder in-line air-cooled Hirth HM 515. This variant had slightly extended and noticeably rounded tips to wings and tail surfaces.

== Operators ==
Hungary

- Royal Hungarian Air Force

== Specifications (Si 202A) ==
Data from Grey 1972, p. 166c

General characteristics

- Crew: 2
- Length: 6.4 m (21 ft 0 in)
- Wingspan: 10.5 m (34 ft 5 in)
- Height: 1.85 m (6 ft 1 in)
- Wing area: 14 m^{2} (150 sq ft)
- Empty weight: 300 kg (661 lb)
- Gross weight: 520 kg (1,146 lb)
- Fuel capacity: 45 L (12 US gal; 9.9 imp gal) in a forward fuselage tank
- Powerplant: 1 × Salmson 9Ad 9-cylinder air-cooled radial piston engine, 34 kW (45 hp)
- Propellers: 2-bladed fixed-pitch propeller

Performance

- Maximum speed: 155 km/h (96 mph, 84 kn)
- Cruise speed: 140 km/h (87 mph, 76 kn)
- Service ceiling: 3,300 m (10,800 ft)
- Absolute ceiling: 4,300 m (14,100 ft)
- Time to altitude: 1,000 m (3,300 ft) in 8 minutes 30 seconds
- Wing loading: 37.1 kg/m^{2} (7.6 lb/sq ft)
- Power/mass: 0.044 hp/lb (0.072 kW/kg)
