= Gotha Go 150 =

1930s German light aircraft

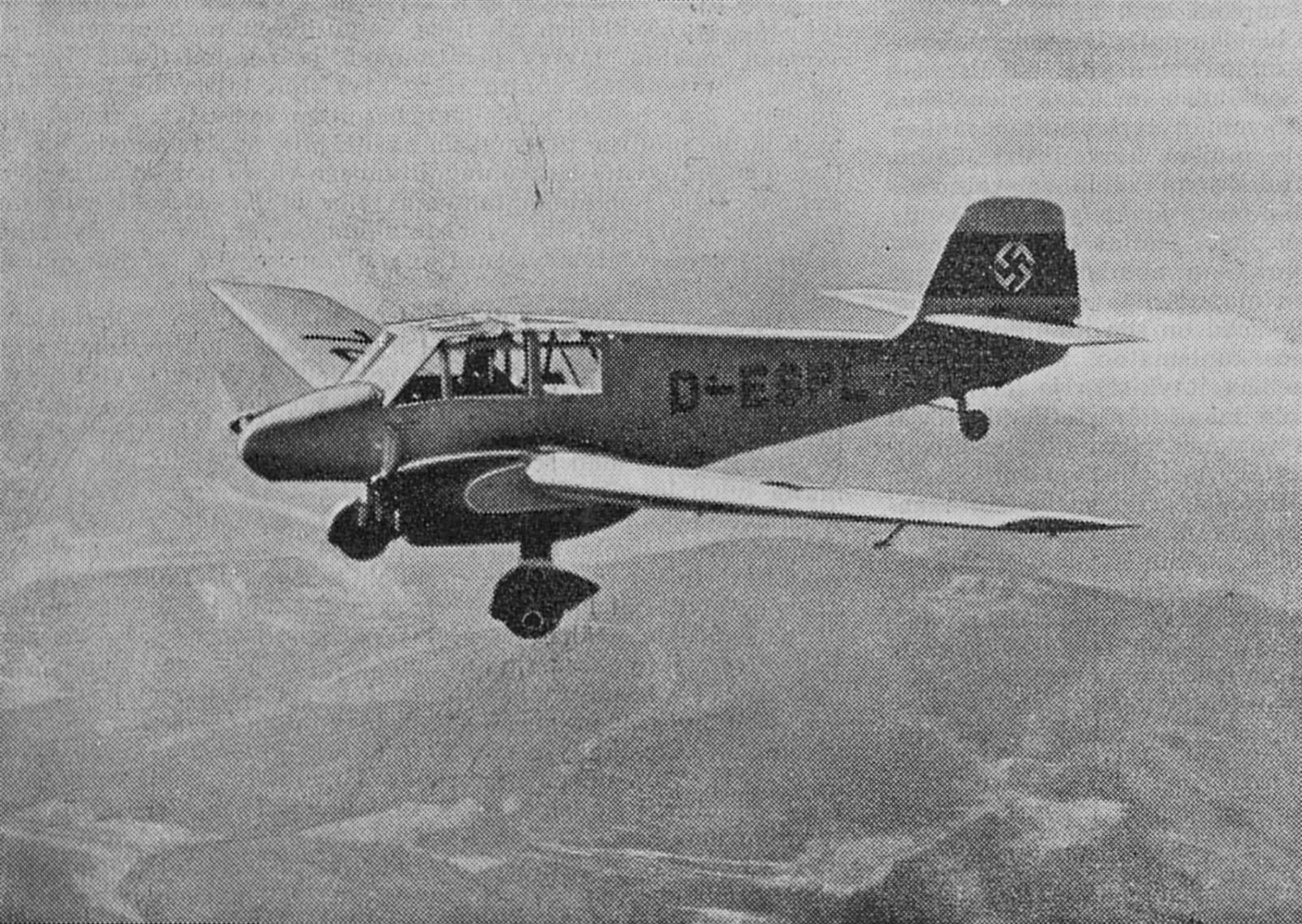

General information
- Type: Light aircraft
- National origin: Germany
- Manufacturer: Gothaer Waggonfabrik
- Number built: 12

The Gotha Go 150 was a light aircraft designed at the German company Gothaer Waggonfabrik in the late 1930s. It was intended for civilian use, but ended up being used as a military trainer.

== Development ==
In January 1937, the individual in charge of developing new aircraft at the Reichsluftfahrtministerium, Major Werner Junck, advised several aircraft maker that they would not be receiving any more contracts for the development of military aircraft. Instead they should focus on creating a Volksflugzeug. This led to the development of the Go 150, along with other aircraft, such as the Kl 105, Fi 253, Si 202, and the Bü 180.

The aircraft was a twin-engined monoplane with an enclosed cockpit. It was designed by Albert Kalkert, and first flew in 1937. The results of this flight were good, and production began. The aircraft was used to train both civilian and Luftwaffe pilots. The Go 150 was later also used in tests, where it was towed by a Heinkel He 46.

== Specifications ==
Data from Flugzeug-Typenbuch : Handbuch der Deutschen Luftfahrt- und Zubehör-Industrie 1939/40

General characteristics

- Crew: 1
- Capacity: 1 pax
- Length: 7.15 m (23 ft 5 in)
- Wingspan: 11.8 m (38 ft 9 in)
- Height: 2.03 m (6 ft 8 in)
- Wing area: 17.5 m^{2} (188 sq ft)
- Aspect ratio: 7.88
- Width folded: 3.85 m (13 ft)
- Empty weight: 512 kg (1,129 lb)
- Gross weight: 850 kg (1,874 lb)
- Max takeoff weight: 1,036 kg (2,284 lb)
- Fuel capacity: 150 L (40 US gal; 33 imp gal) fuel; 7 L (1.8 US gal; 1.5 imp gal) oil
- Powerplant: 2 × Zündapp Z 9-092 4-cylinder inverted air-cooled in-line piston engine 50 / 55 PS (49 / 54 hp; 37 / 40 kW) take-off/max continuous
- Propellers: 2-bladed fixed-pitch wooden propellers, 1.55 m (5 ft 1 in) diameter
- Propeller disc area: 3.76 m^{2} (40.47 sq ft)
- Propeller loading: 26.6 PS/m^{2} (2.44 hp/sq ft; 19.6 kW/m^{2})

Performance

- Maximum speed: 200 km/h (120 mph, 110 kn)
- Cruise speed: 185 km/h (115 mph, 100 kn)
- Landing speed: 70 km/h (43 mph; 38 kn)
- Range: 750 km (470 mi, 400 nmi)
- Endurance: 4 hours 5 minutes
- Service ceiling: 4,500 m (14,800 ft)
- g limits: +6.03 (ultimate)
- Time to altitude: 1,000 m (3,300 ft) in 5 minutes 30 seconds
- Wing loading: 48.5 kg/m^{2} (9.9 lb/sq ft)
- Power/mass: 0.118 PS/kg (0.053 hp/lb; 0.087 kW/kg)
- Fuel consumption: 8.13 km/L (19.1 mpg_{‑US}; 23.0 mpg_{‑imp})
- Take-off run: 400 m (1,300 ft)
- Landing run: 350 m (1,150 ft)

== Bibliography ==
- Metzmacher, Andreas (2021). Gotha Aircraft 1913-1954: From the London Bomber to the Flying Wing Jet Fighter. Brimscombe, Stroud: Fonthill. ISBN 978-1-78155-706-8.
