= Roter Berg (Ore Mountains) =

Mountain in Saxony, Germany

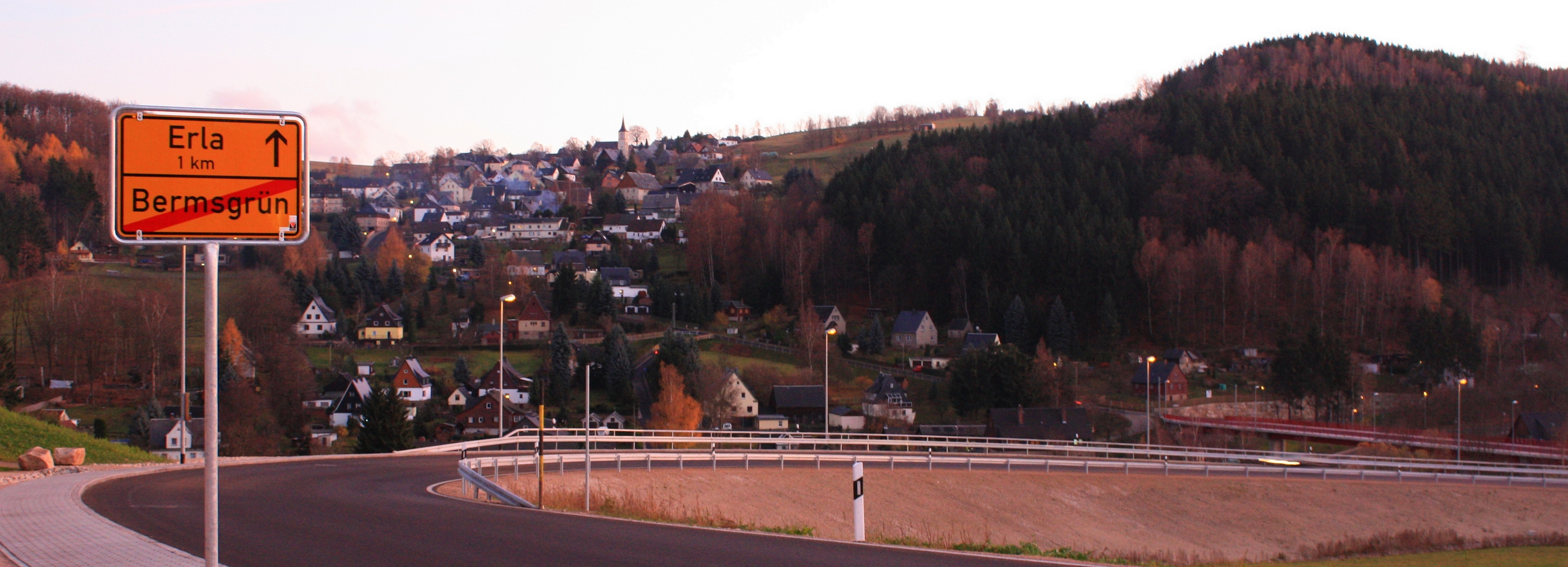

Highest point
- Elevation: 668 m (2,192 ft)
- Listing: Schneeberg ore district
- Coordinates: 50°30′47″N 12°46′53″E

Geography
- Location within Saxony
- Location: Saxony, Germany

The Roter Berg in the Ore Mountains is a mountain in the German free state of Saxony in southeastern Germany.
