= Bücker Bü 180 Student =

1930s aircraft built by Bücker Flugzeugbau

Bü 180 Student
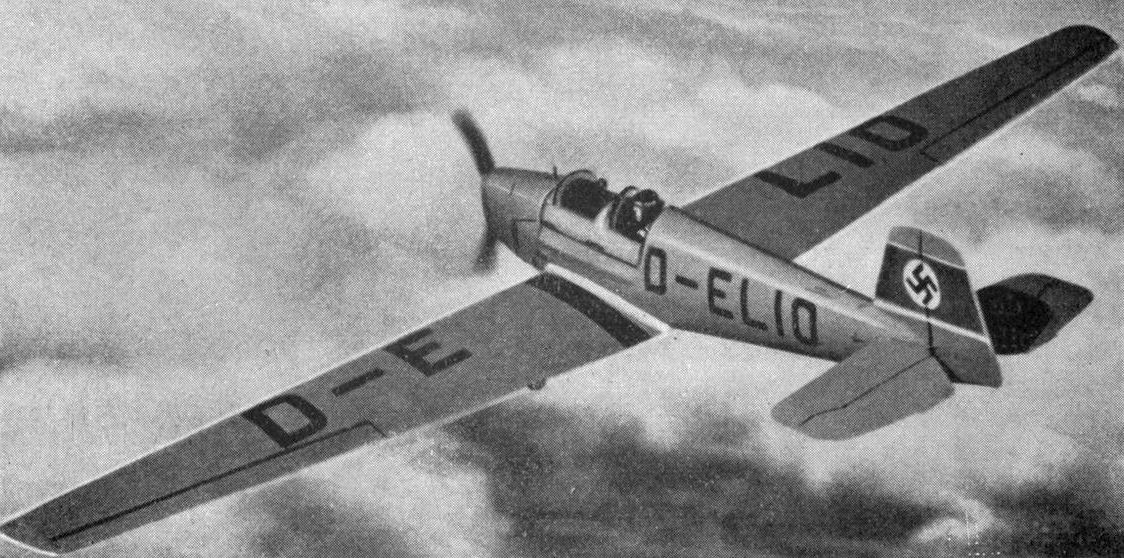

General information
- Type: Two-seat sport/training monoplane
- Manufacturer: Bücker Flugzeugbau

History
- First flight: 1937

The Bücker Bü 180 Student was a 1930s German two-seat sporting/training aircraft built by Bücker Flugzeugbau.

== Development ==
In January 1937, the individual in charge of developing new aircraft at the Reichsluftfahrtministerium, Major Werner Junck, advised several aircraft maker that they would not be receiving any more contracts for the development of military aircraft. Instead they should focus on creating a Volksflugzeug. This led to the development of the Bü 180 along with other aircraft, such as the Kl 105, Fi 253, Si 202, and the Go 150.

It was a low-wing cantilever monoplane that would be later used as a trainer aircraft and named Student. The wing was of wooden construction with a mixture of plywood and fabric covering. The fuselage was a steel tube frame forward and a wooden monocoque aft with a fabric covering. The Student had a fixed tailskid landing gear and was powered by a Walter Mikron II inline engine. The prototype first flew in 1937 and a small number were built for civilian use.

One example was restored and gifted to the Quax-Verein Flying Club in 2016.

== Variants ==
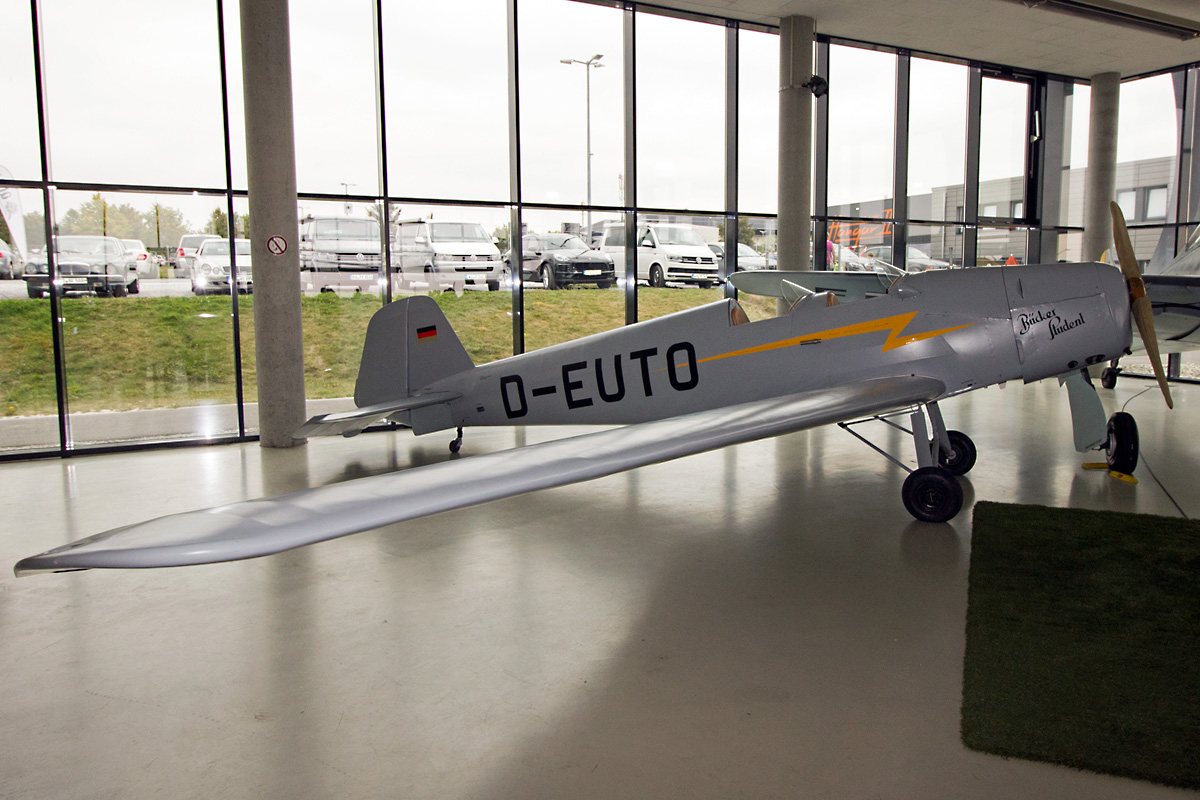
A preserved Student on display

Bü 180A
Production variant with a 37 kW (50 hp) Zündapp Z9-092 engine.
Bü 180B
Production variant with a 45 kW (60 hp) Walter Mikron II engine.
Bü 180C
Proposed variant with an 60 kW (80 hp) Bücker Bü M700 engine.

== Specifications (Bü 180B) ==
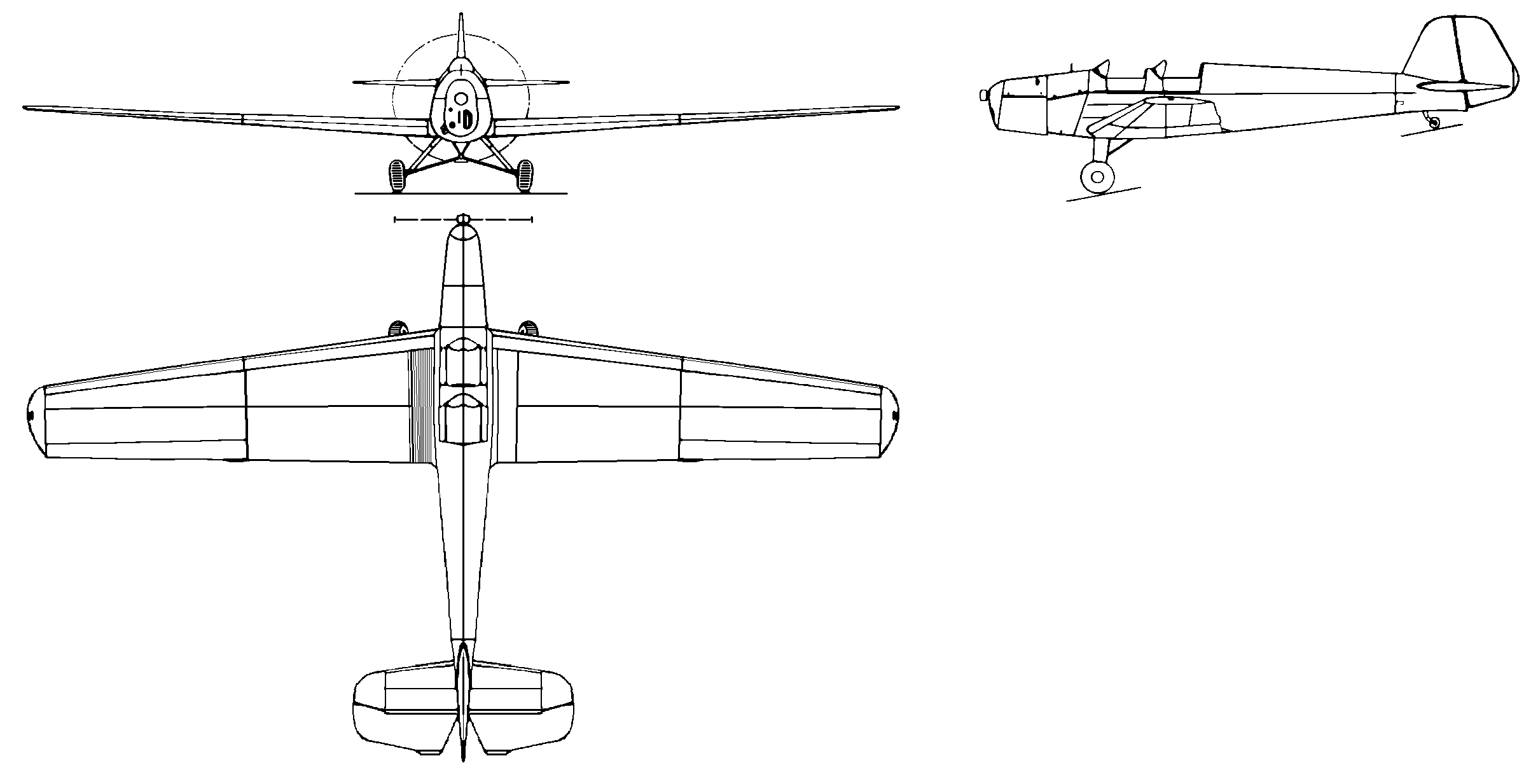
Bü 180 Student 3-view

Data from Aircraft of the Third Reich and The Encyclopedia of World Aircraft.

General characteristics

- Crew: 2
- Length: 7.1 m (23 ft 4 in)
- Wingspan: 11.5 m (37 ft 9 in)
- Height: 1.85 m (6 ft 1 in)
- Wing area: 15 m^{2} (160 sq ft)
- Empty weight: 295 kg (650 lb)
- Gross weight: 540 kg (1,190 lb)
- Powerplant: 1 × Walter Mikron II inverted 4-cyl. air-cooled in-line piston engine, 45 kW (60 hp)
- Propellers: 2-bladed fixed pitch propeller

Performance

- Maximum speed: 175 km/h (109 mph, 94 kn) at sea level
- Cruise speed: 160 km/h (99 mph, 86 kn)
- Range: 650 km (400 mi, 350 nmi)
- Service ceiling: 4,500 m (14,800 ft)
- Time to altitude: 1,000 m (3,300 ft) in 8 minutes 54 seconds

== See also ==
- Volksflugzeug

Related development

- Bücker Bü 134
- Bücker Bü 182

Aircraft of comparable role, configuration, and era

- de Havilland Moth Minor
