= Arado Ar 80 =

1935 prototype fighter aircraft by Arado

Ar 80
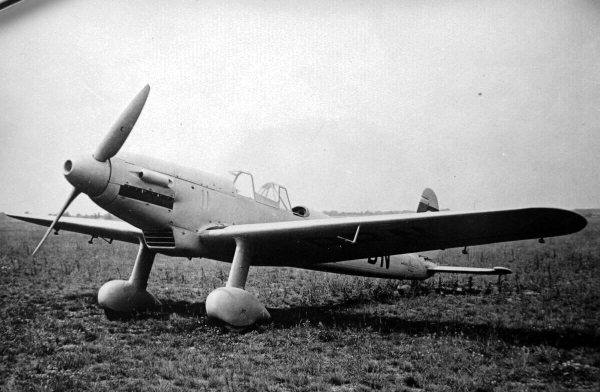

General information
- Type: Fighter
- National origin: Germany
- Manufacturer: Arado Flugzeugwerke
- Designer: Walter Blume
- Number built: 3

History
- First flight: Spring 1935

The Arado Ar 80 was a pre-World War II fighter aircraft, designed by Arado Flugzeugwerke to compete for the Luftwaffe's first major fighter contract. The Ar 80 was uninspiring in terms of performance and also suffered a number of failures. The contest was eventually won by the Messerschmitt Bf 109, and the Ar 80 prototypes ended their days as test aircraft.

== Design and development ==
With the Nazi rise to power in February 1933, a plan was put into place to dramatically expand the Luftwaffe. The new and highly-political Reichsluftfahrtministerium (RLM) demanded that the large industrial firms cooperate, keeping construction as secret as possible. Arado Flugzeugwerke, under the direction of Erich Serno and Felix Wagenführ, largely stopped being a designer of aircraft and increasingly became a production facility for other companies.

However, the company had just completed the Ar 65 biplane fighter. Several orders were placed for the Ar 65, and a follow-on Ar 68 model. This made Arado one of the few companies with actual fighter design experience, and they were considered for future developments

In 1933, the Technisches Amt, the technical department of the RLM, concluded a series of research projects into the future of air combat. One of these was Rüstungsflugzeug IV for an all-metal monoplane single-seat fighter aircraft, replacing the Ar 64 and Heinkel He 51 biplanes then in service. The plane needed to have a top speed of 400 km/h (250 mph) at 6,000 m (19,590 ft) which it could maintain for 20 minutes, while staying in the air for a total of 90 minutes. It was to be powered by the new Junkers Jumo 210 engine. It also needed to be armed with at least three machine guns with 1,000 rounds each, or one 20 mm cannon with 200 rounds. The plane needed to keep wing loading below 100 kg/m^{2}, which is a way of defining its ability to turn and climb. The priorities for the plane were level speed, rate of climb, and maneuverability, in that order. Hermann Göring sent out a letter in October 1933 asking for a "high speed courier aircraft" in order to start the work, and in May 1934, the actual R-IV request was sent out and made official. In addition to Heinkel and Arado, Focke-Wulf, and Bayerische Flugzeugwerke competed. They had to deliver three prototypes for head-to-head testing in late 1934.

Although Blume was officially the director of design at Arado, it was Rethel who did most of the early work on the design. Rethel was well aware of the advantages and disadvantages of the monocoque technique, but the company had never built such a design and was thus at a distinct disadvantage in relation to Heinkel who had used it on their He 70 Blitz design from 1932.

However he felt that he could not only design a successful monocoque aircraft, but in fact make one that was both lighter and easier to build than the techniques being used at other companies. His solution was to use two sets of skinning plates formed in long strips running front to back along the plane.

The first set of plates was formed roughly into the shape of a C, which a small flange at the open ends of the C where they could be easily riveted to the hoop bulkheads. Using this system he was able to eliminate one more piece of internal structure, the stringers that would normally run between the bulkheads. He used a second set of sheets that were flat, so they could easily bend front-to-back. They were cut into teardrop shapes, which exactly fit into the gaps between the main stringers. Not only did this system allow for the "perfect" aerodynamic shape, but in theory it was also lighter and easier to build. The system looked so hopeful that other parts of the aircraft's design were allowed to be heavier and less risky as the weight savings in the fuselage should compensate.

The rest of the plane was conventional. The forward fuselage and inner wings were formed up from steel tubing with removable aluminium sheeting over it, the outer wings were aluminium formers and skinned with aluminium on top and fabric on the bottom. Like the Heinkel designs, the wing included a reverse-gull bend to shorten the landing gear legs, but unlike the Heinkel it was almost straight on the leading and trailing edges instead of the more complex elliptical planform favoured by the Günter brothers.

In order to avoid cutting the outer wing formers with outward retracting gear, Rether decided to have the landing gear retract directly to the rear. To lie flat, the wheel would have to be rotated through 90° as it retracted, with its mainwheel resting atop the lower end of the strut as with the contemporary American Curtiss P-36 Hawk fighter design. To do this, Rethel placed the main oleo strut inside a larger tube that was mounted to the pivot point on the lower leading edge of the box-spar. As the gear retracted a small arm would pull on a lever mounted to the oleo, turning the leg inside the larger tube.

== Prototypes and testing ==
The design, now known as the Ar 80, was completed without the aid of Rethel; he left the company in 1934 to join BFW leaving Blume in charge of the project.

The plane was designed to mount the Jumo 210 engine, driving a wooden two-blade fixed-pitch propeller. However, this engine was not going to be ready until the contest was supposed to be over, so all of the contestants looked for other engines to fill the hole. In this case Arado proved to have the advantage, as they had already purchased a 391 kW (525 hp) Rolls-Royce Kestrel VI engine for use on their Ar 67 design. The engine had less than optimal supercharging which led to poor performance for the Ar 67.

The V1 prototype first took to the air in the spring of 1935, one of the first of the planes in the contest to do so. However, one of the company test pilots lost control at low altitude only weeks later, and V1 was written off.

The landing gear had already proven to be a real problem in these few short weeks. It continued to stick half-closed when retracted, although luckily it returned to the down position for landing. Repeated attempts to find the problem were fruitless, when they put the plane on blocks in the hangar it would always work flawlessly. Eventually, it was found that the air pressure on the front of the strut in flight made the oleo jam in its tube so it couldn't rotate.

Another problem discovered during construction of the V1 was that Rethel's monocoque technique in fact turned out to be much heavier than expected. Some of this was a problem in the actual design; since the sheets ran the length of the plane, they had to be as thick as the thickest point on the entire plane. More traditional designs could use lighter or heavier gauges in various places. The main problem, however, was that the design required considerably more rivets than expected, and as a result the plane was overweight.

V2 was rushed to completion but the Jumo was still unavailable. In order to give the contestants some sort of realistic engine, the RLM had traded Rolls-Royce an He 70 for four 518 kW (695 hp) Kestrel V engines. Although the V was the same basic engine as the VI, it had much better supercharging and was in fact the most powerful inline engine of the day. The various companies competed heavily for access to these engines for their prototypes. Perhaps some idea of the future outcome can be seen in the fact that BFW received two, Arado and Heinkel one each, and Focke-Wulf none at all.

V2 was completed with the Kestrel by autumn of 1937, and started company testing. Once again, the gear proved to be a problem. Blume immediately blamed all of the problems on Rethel, after noting that he was always skeptical of the design. He decided that the performance problems of having fixed gear would be offset by its lighter weight, and the Ar 80 then reverted to using a well-spatted and faired set of gear similar to those used on their various biplane designs. Several months were lost in the conversion.

The use of the fixed gear didn't save as much weight as expected and the plane was still 16% over the design weight at 1,630 kg (3,590 lb) empty. Fully loaded the plane was 2,100 kg (4,630 lb) even without armament, which made it underpowered even with the Kestrel V. Drag was also higher than expected. Thus, the plane proved to have very disappointing performance, reaching only 410 km/h (255 mph).

In early 1936, the Jumo engines finally arrived. The 210 had even less takeoff power than the Kestrel, but its altitude performance was comparable. Speed did increase with this engine at higher altitudes, but low-level speed and climb performance both dropped. Arado argued that the fitting of a constant speed propeller would boost both, with the speed climbing to 425 km/h (264 mph), but this was not attempted before the plane was sent off to the contest.

Although the Ar 80 had been one of the first planes to fly, the continued problems with the gear and engine supply meant it was one of the last to arrive for the head-to-head fly-off. It was delivered to Travemünde on 8 February 1936, and later moved to meet the rest of the planes at Rechlin-Lärz Airfield in March. It was clear all along that the plane had no chance against the Heinkel and BFW designs, a fact that Arado was made officially aware of after only one month.

By this point, V3 was already finished. In order to try to save weight, the design had removed the gull-wing and replaced it with a "flat" one, requiring slightly longer gear legs. It also mounted the Jumo 210C with the constant-speed propeller, which boosted speed to 410 km/h (255 mph). By this time, the RLM had already given up on the design, so the plane was not sent for testing and instead hangared at the Arado plant.

In 1937, the V3 was resurrected as a flying testbed for several experiments. It was fitted with a second seat behind the pilot for an observer, and also added an enclosed canopy. The plane was first used for testing a 20 mm cannon firing through the spinner, making it the first German cannon-armed fighter. This system, called the "motorkanone" - an armament format pioneered with the 37 mm cannon-armed French SPAD S.XII in World War I - would become a standard feature of most German inline engined fighter designs during the war.

In 1938, the V3 was rebuilt once again, this time to test a new Fowler Flap design Arado was intending to use on their Ar 198 and Ar 240. Testing showed that the flap was so effective that the lift distribution along the wing changed radically, so a further modification was added to "droop" the ailerons along with the flaps. Testing continued for some time in this form, resulting in the "Arado traveling aileron" and "Arado landing flap".

== Specifications (Ar 80 V2 (Jumo engine)) ==
Data from Warplanes of the Third Reich.

General characteristics

- Crew: 1
- Length: 10.30 m (33 ft 10 in)
- Wingspan: 10.89 m (35 ft 9 in)
- Height: 2.65 m (8 ft 8 in)
- Wing area: 21.0 m^{2} (226 sq ft)
- Empty weight: 1,642 kg (3,620 lb)
- Gross weight: 2,125 kg (4,684 lb)
- Powerplant: 1 × Junkers Jumo 210C liquid-cooled V12 engine, 480 kW (640 hp) at 2,700 m (8,858 ft)

Performance

- Maximum speed: 415 km/h (258 mph, 224 kn) at 2,700 m (8,850 ft)
- Range: 800 km (497 mi, 432 nmi)
- Rate of climb: 9.5 m/s (1,870 ft/min)

Armament

- Guns: 2× 7.92mm MG 17 machine guns (proposed)

== See also ==
Aircraft of comparable role, configuration, and era

- Focke-Wulf Fw 159V1
- Heinkel He 112V1
- Messerschmitt Bf 109V1

Related lists

- List of military aircraft of Germany
