= Arado Ar 66 =

Training biplane

Ar 66
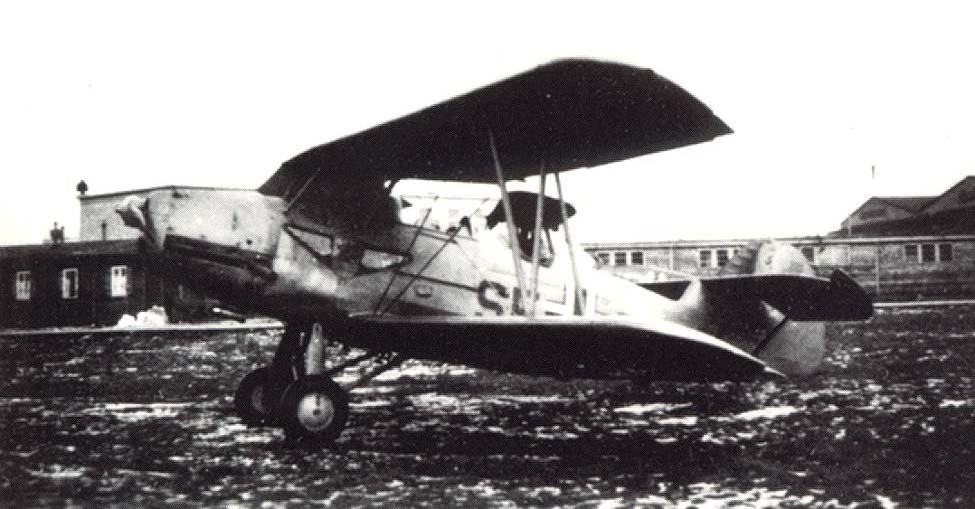

General information
- Type: Trainer
- Manufacturer: Arado Flugzeugwerke
- Designer: Walter Rethel
- Primary user: Luftwaffe
- Number built: 1,456

History
- Introduction date: 1933
- First flight: 1932

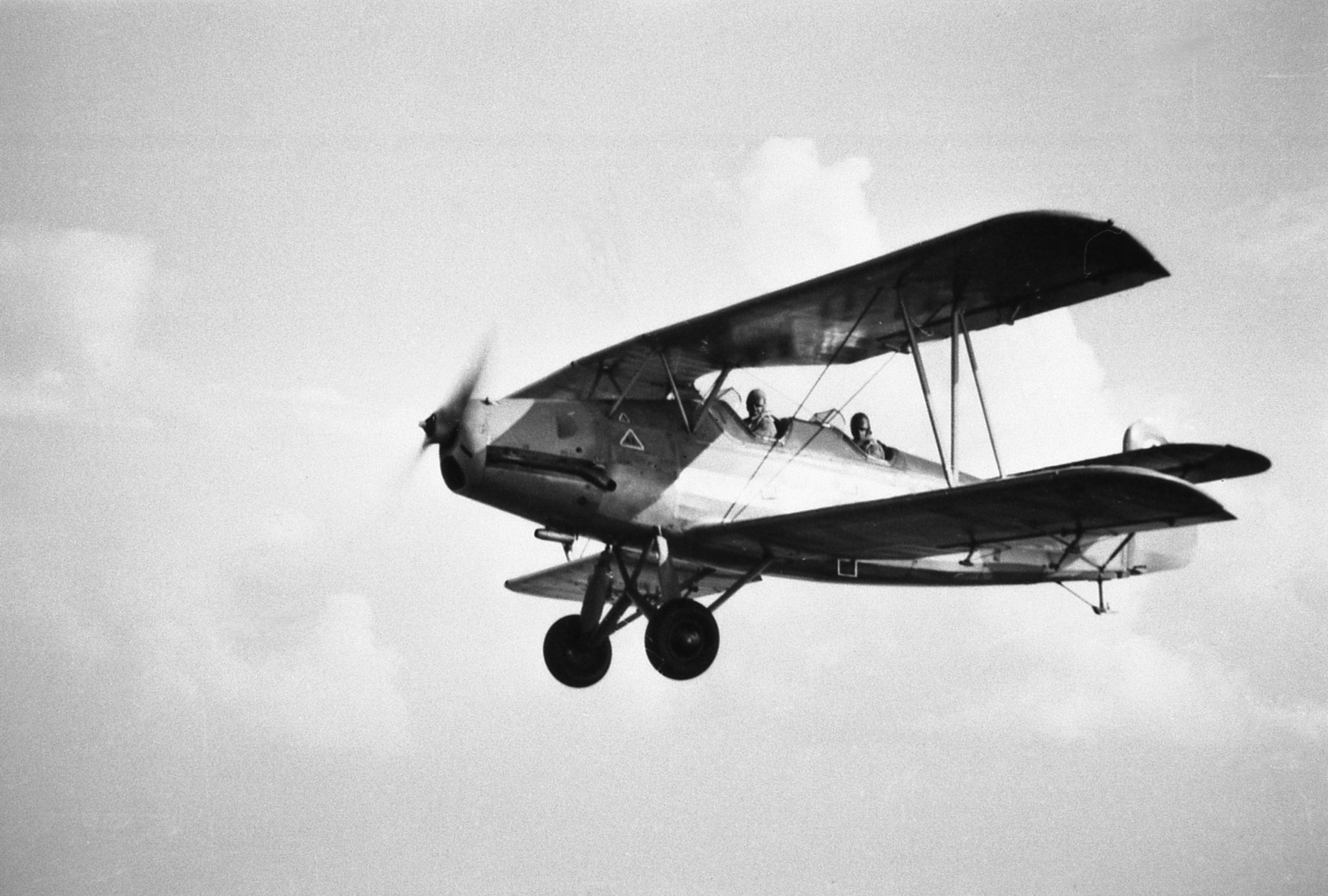
Arado Ar 66c

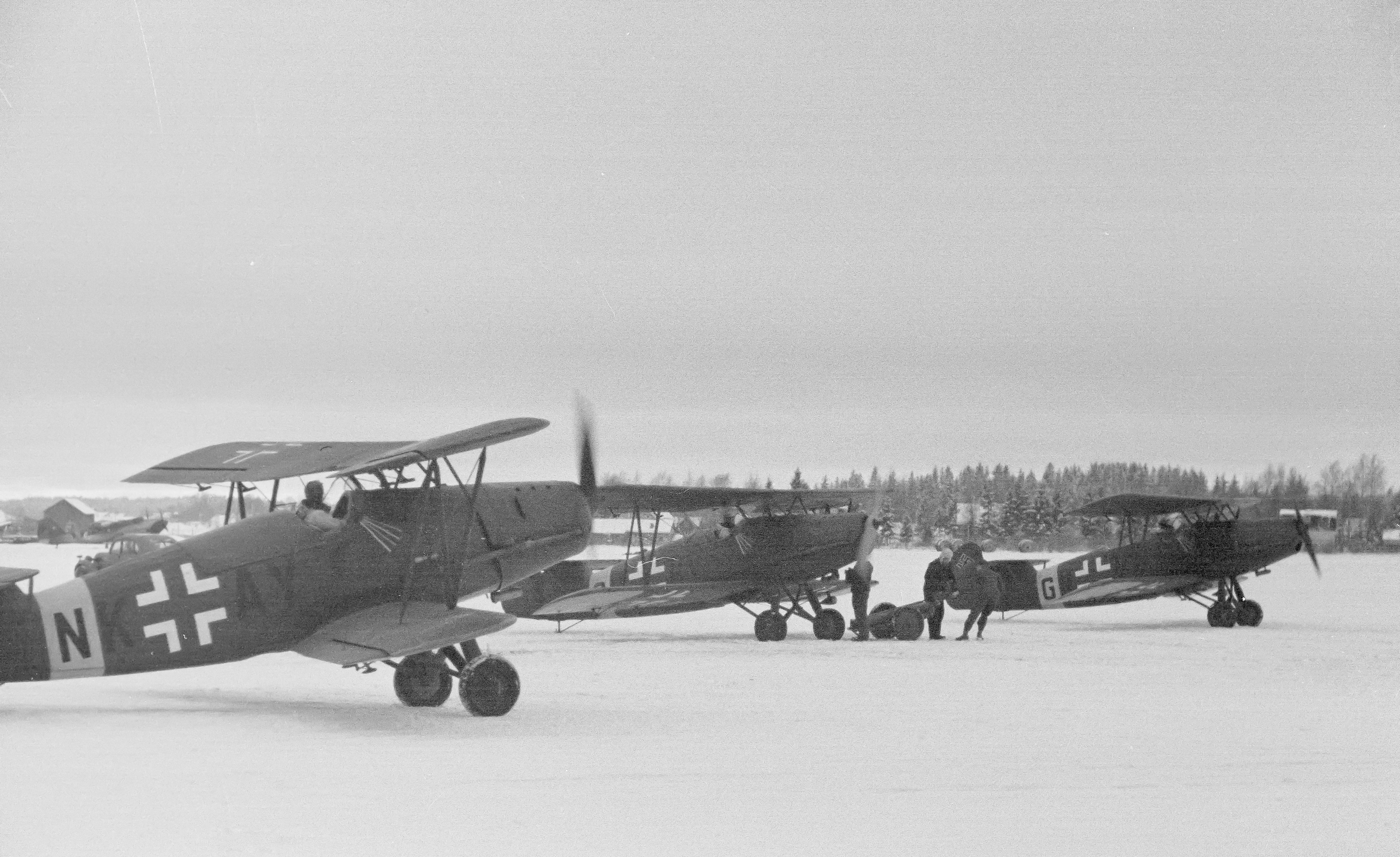
Arado Ar 66

The Arado Ar 66 was a single-engined twin-seat training biplane designed and produced by the German aircraft manufacturer Arado. It was the last aircraft to be designed by the aeronautical engineer Walter Rethel in collaboration with Arado.

The Ar 66 was developed as a military trainer aircraft during the early 1930s. First flown in 1932, it quickly proved superior to two rival aircraft and was selected to meet the training needs of the Luftwaffe. In addition to primary flight training, the Ar 66 was used for aerobatics and night-time instruction along with the training of various air crew positions, such as bombardiers, radio operations, aerial photographers, and machine gun operators.

The Ar 66 was produced by multiple companies under licence in order to provide the large numbers sought. In addition to the Luftwaffe, which introduced the type in 1933, both the Czechoslovak Air Force and Spanish Air Force also operated a number of Ar 66s. In addition to land-based use, it could also be deployed as a float plane. The Ar 66 remained in use throughout the Second World War. Additionally, it was deployed by the Luftwaffe into front line combat during the conflict; Ar 66s regularly undertook night ground-attack missions on the Eastern Front.

== Design and development ==
During the late 1920s and early 1930s, Arado's design team, headed by the company's chief designer Walter Rethel, produced a number of capable aircraft, such as the Ar 65 biplane fighter. According to the aviation historian Jörg Armin Kranzhoff, the company had become confident enough of an order for new twin-seat trainer aircraft from the German government that, by 1930, it had directed the production of multiple project designs to fulfil this anticipated demand. Despite this confidence, the Deutsche Verkehrsfliegerschule, a German covert military-training organization, lacked financial resources and thus did not act quickly to issue any such contract. As such, early development work on what would become the Ar 66 was paid for out of Arado's own resources.

While work on the project had been started under Rethel's leadership, the later stages of development were led by Walter Blume after Rethel transferred to the rival German aircraft manufacturer Messerschmitt. During 1932, the first prototype, designated as the Ar 66a, performed its maiden flight. This was followed by an Ar 66b prototype and 10 production Ar 66B sea-planes with twin wooden floats and an enlarged rudder. By the end of September of that year, the prototype had demonstrated itself to possess superior performance to two competing aircraft; accordingly, the Ar 66 was selected for further flight testing at the test centre of the Reichsverband der Deutschen Luftfahrtindustrie (RDL).

A third (Ar 66c) prototype followed, and the production version of this, designated Ar 66C was delivered from 1933. Quantity production of the Ar 66 commenced shortly after the receipt of an initial production contract for 320 aircraft. The vast quantity ordered was somewhat of a challenge to Arado; the rate of production required to fulfil the order in a reasonable timeframe was far in excess of its historic practices; a quota of 712 Ar 66s was set to be completed by 30 April 1936. New production methods and planning approaches were promptly adopted, yet these were still not sufficient. Licenses to produce the Ar 66 were issued to multiple German aircraft manufacturers, including MIAG, 90 for Bayerische Flugzeugwerke AG and Gothaer Waggonfabrik. During 1936 alone, 270 aircraft were produced.

== Design ==
The Ar 66 was a staggered-wing biplane of composite construction. Designed for use as a primary trainer, it was suitable for aerobatics and night-time instruction, as well as the training of various types of air crew, including bombardiers, radio operations, aerial photographers, and machine gun operators; the Ar 66 could also be employed as a single-seat fighter-trainer. The aircraft was typically operated by crew of two: instructor pilot and trainee, which were seated in open tandem cockpits; both positions were equipped with dual flight controls. The Ar 66 was equipped with instrument flight systems and could optionally be outfitted with photographic cameras. It was powered by a single Argus As 10C air-cooled inverted V8 engine, which produced roughly 179 kW (240 hp) and drove a 2.5 m (8.2 ft) two-blade propeller. The aircraft carried up to 205 L (54 US gal) of fuel along with 17 L (4 US gal) of oil.

The fuselage of the Ar 66 had an oval cross-section and was made of welded steel tubes, covered with fabric. The aircraft's double wings provided very high lift, even when flown at relatively low speeds. Both wings had the same span and an 8° sweep. Construction consisted of a double pine wing spar structure, with lime tree ribs, and fabric covering. Both the upper and lower wings were equipped with multiple counterbalanced ailerons. According to Kranzhoff, the most unique feature of Ar 66 was the unusually high horizontal stabilizers, which was also mounted on the upper surface of the fuselage at an atypically forward position. The tail had an otherwise conventional design, the rudder having been placed behind the elevators; both the rudder and the elevators were composed of steel tube covered in fabric, and had a bigger surface than had been used on the prototype in order to address balance concerns.

The steel tube undercarriage was attached to the fuselage in a "V" shape and used high-pressure rubber suspension. An improved undercarriage arrangement was adopted for production aircraft; this included low-pressure tyres, wheel brakes, and oil-cushioned spring struts. Yet another arrangement was developed for the Ar 66b floatplane.

== Operational history ==
During 1933, the Ar 66 entered service with the Luftwaffe. For the next decade, the majority of pilots in the service would fly the type at some point in their careers. The favourable handling qualities that it possessed likely contributed to its relatively low accident rate. Arado decided to capitalise on the positive reputation of the Ar 66; for the first time, it published a wide range of advertisements across multiple languages centred on the aircraft. The Ar 66 was in widespread use in the trainer role into the latter half of the Second World War.

During the conflict, the Ar 66 undertook several prominent or atypical duties. During 1939, individual aircraft performed aerial reconnaissance over the Polish Corridor. During 1943, the Luftwaffe set up a number of Störkampfstaffeln (harassment squadrons) to operate in Finland, Latvia and the USSR. The Ar 66, along with the Gotha Go 145, formed the principal equipment of these groups.

== Variants ==
Data from Aircraft of the Third Reich

Ar 66a
Prototype
Ar 66b
2nd prototype completed as a floatplane
Ar 66B
Production Seaplane version of Ar 66C. Two large steel hollow floats, braced with iron cable. About ten were constructed and used for seaplane training.
Ar 66C
Series production model with modified elevators, larger rudder, and larger-diameter wheels.

== Operators ==
Czechoslovakia

- Czechoslovak Air Force (postwar)

Germany

- Luftwaffe
  - Nachtschlachtgruppe 2
  - Nachtschlachtgruppe 3
  - Nachtschlachtgruppe 5
  - Nachtschlachtgruppe 8
  - Nachtschlachtgruppe 12

Spain

- Spanish Air Force

== Surviving aircraft ==
At the end of World War 2, several Arado 66C belonging to 3./ Nachtschlachtgruppe 8 were abandoned at Bardufoss, in Norway. Eventually the remains of several aircraft were collected by the Forsvarsmuseet (National Defence Museum) of Norway and transported to Gardermoen outside Oslo. Later on some of the parts were sent to the Flyhistorisk Museum at Sola. Restoration started in 1996 and has necessitated the creation of new wings and a tail. An original Argus AS 10C has been rebuilt and the restoration of the fuselage was still ongoing in 2024.

== Specifications (Ar 66C) ==
Data from Aircraft of the Third Reich, Flugzeug Typenbuch 1936

General characteristics

- Crew: two
- Length: 8.3 m (27 ft 3 in)
- Wingspan: 10 m (32 ft 10 in)
- Height: 2.93 m (9 ft 7 in)
- Wing area: 29.63 m^{2} (318.9 sq ft)
- Aspect ratio: 6.2
- Empty weight: 905 kg (1,995 lb)
- Max takeoff weight: 1,330 kg (2,932 lb)
- Fuel capacity: main tank:172 L (45 US gal; 38 imp gal); reserve tank:33 L (8.7 US gal; 7.3 imp gal); oil tank:17 L (4.5 US gal; 3.7 imp gal)
- Powerplant: 1 × Argus As 10C inverted V-8 air-cooled piston engine, 179 kW (240 hp)
- Propellers: 2-bladed wooden fixed pitch propeller, 2.5 m (8 ft 2 in) diameter

Performance

- Maximum speed: 210 km/h (130 mph, 110 kn) at sea level
- Cruise speed: 175 km/h (109 mph, 94 kn) at optimum altitude
- Landing Speed: 80 km/h (50 mph; 43 kn)
- Range: 716 km (445 mi, 387 nmi)
- Endurance: 4.1 hours
- Service ceiling: 4,500 m (14,800 ft)
- Rate of climb: 4.33 m/s (852 ft/min)
- Time to altitude: 1,000 m (3,300 ft) in 4.1 minutes
- Wing loading: 45 kg/m^{2} (9.2 lb/sq ft)
- Power/mass: 7.44 kg/kW (12.24 lb/hp)
- Fuel consumption: 26.7 L (7.1 US gal; 5.9 imp gal) / 100 km (62 mi)
- Oil consumption: 0.86 L (0.23 US gal; 0.19 imp gal) / 100 km (62 mi)

Armament

- 2 kg (4.4 lb) and 4 kg (8.8 lb) anti-personnel bombs

== See also ==
Aircraft of comparable role, configuration, and era

- Avro Tutor
- Bücker Bü 131 Jungmann
- Gotha Go 145
- Repülőgépgyár Levente II

Related lists

- List of interwar military aircraft
- List of military aircraft of Germany
- List of World War II military aircraft of Germany
