= Arado Ar 68 =

German single-engine biplane fighter

Ar 68
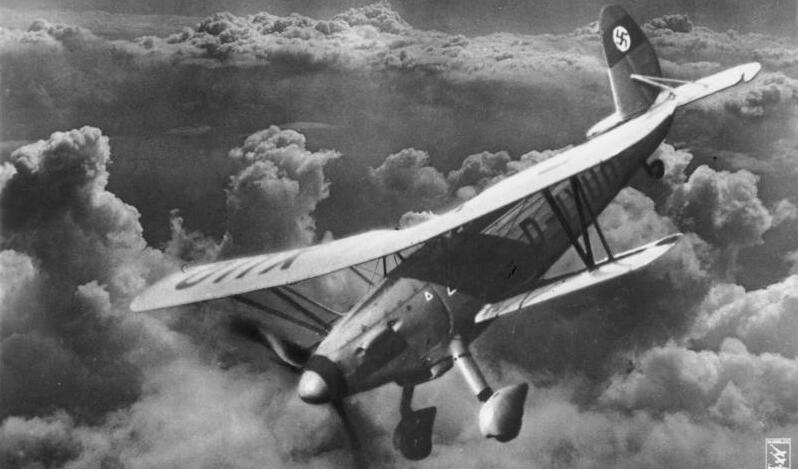

General information
- Type: Biplane Fighter
- Role: Fighter, Night Fighter, Trainer
- National origin: Nazi Germany
- Manufacturer: Arado
- Designer: Walter Blume
- Primary user: Luftwaffe
- Prototypes: Ar 68a Ar 68b
- Number built: 514

History
- Manufactured: 1936-37
- Introduction date: 1936
- First flight: 1934
- Retired: 1944
- Variant: Ar 68F Ar 68E
- Predecessors: Ar 67

The Arado Ar 68 was a single-seat biplane fighter designed and produced by the German aircraft manufacturer Arado Flugzeugwerke. It was among the first fighters produced when Germany abandoned the restrictions of the Treaty of Versailles and began rearming.

The Ar 68 was a part of Arado's continuing fighter development programme, being designed during the early 1930s as a biplane of relatively standard construction. Both the Rolls-Royce Kestrel and BMW VI engines originally selected to power the type proved inferior in high-altitude performance to the newer Junkers Jumo 210; however, due to its limited availability, only late-production Ar 68s were fitted with this engine. In addition to its twin 7.92 mm (0.312 in) MG 17 machine guns, some aircraft were provisioned with a compact bomb bay. While the Ar 68 possessed favourable handling characteristics, some officials were concerned that the unforgiving nature of high-performance aircraft would make the aircraft unsuitable, allegedly nearly causing production to be terminated.

The prototype made its maiden flight in early 1934; Chief of the Technical Office Ernst Udet personally flew the aircraft, during which the competing Heinkel He 51 proved to be outclassed. During 1936, the Ar 68 entered service with the Luftwaffe; two years later, it was used by Condor Legion in active combat during the Spanish Civil War. In response to the Soviet Polikarpov I-16, Arado upgraded the engine of the Ar 68E, which was the Luftwaffe's most widely used fighter during 1937–1938. The type was eclipsed by the Messerschmitt Bf 109, a monoplane fighter, prior to the outbreak of the Second World War; however, it continued to be operated, mainly as a trainer, as late as 1944.

== Design and development ==
=== Background ===
During the early to mid 1920s, the German aircraft manufacturer Arado had, in conformance with the restrictions on Germany's aviation industry enacted by the Treaty of Versailles, largely focused upon the civil aviation market. However, the company quickly recognised the opportunities available from the Reichswehr (German armed forces), particularly during the 1926-1929 rearmament programme. One initiative of this programme was the development of military prototypes that could, in the event of conflict breaking out, be promptly put into mass production. Furthermore, the Reichswehr was quietly re-establishing a secret air force under the guise of setting up 'display squadrons'. Despite these ambitions, government funding for aviation was limited, and several of the larger German aircraft manufacturers saw little value in producing prototype military aircraft with seemingly little chance of a production order following.

Work on what would become the Ar 68 started in 1932 as part of the company's continuing development programme for fighter designs. As favoured by one of Arado's senior design team members, the aeronautical engineer Walter Rethel, it was a biplane of standard construction. The lower wing was larger than the upper wing, which was necessary for the full-span flaps to be effective, although this negatively impacted the effectiveness of the ailerons on the upper wing. While the Rolls-Royce Kestrel selected to initially power the new aircraft, it was less powerful than the BMW VI of the preceding Ar 65 yet the Ar 68 was predicted to be faster due to its lower weight and aerodymanic improvements. Construction of a single prototype commenced in 1933.

There were no major changes in construction between the different Ar 68 models, comprising steel tubing and a metal-plated exterior from the cockpit forwards, while the sides and underside of the fuselage were covered by fabric. While the winds and empennage control surfaces were also clad in fabric, metal plating covered the tailplane and fin. Armament consisted of a pair of 7.92 mm (0.312 in) MG 17 machine guns, although some aircraft were furnished with a compact bomb bay capable of accommodating up to six 10 kg (22 lb) SC 10 fragmentation bombs. The minimisation of tension cables and the fuselage shape gave the Ar 68 as relatively elegant appearance.

=== Into flight ===
Performing its maiden flight in early 1934, the Ar 68 quickly proved to possess admirable handling characteristics, being fairly maneouverable yet not prone to spinning. Chief of the Technical Office Ernst Udet personally made an early flight in the aircraft, during which he outperformed a Heinkel He 51 in a mock dogfight. Despite this favourable outcome, some officials expressed concerns about the unforgiving nature of such a high-performance aircraft, to the extent that production of Ar 68 was allegedly nearly cancelled entirely.

The Ar 68 competed with the somewhat similar He 51, the first prototypes of each aircraft even adopted the same BMW VI powerplant, albeit with different installation arrangements. While the first and fourth Ar 68 prototypes was powered by the BMW VI, the second, third, and fifth prototypes were powered by the newly developed Junkers Jumo 210 inverted V12 engine, which provided substantially greater high altitude performance than either the Kestrel or BMW VI. Despite its performance advantages, limited availability of the Jumo 210 led to the Ar 68's early production run making use of the BMW VI instead.

By April 1936, Arado had planned for a total production run of 324 Ar 68s, 302 of which were delivered prior to the year's end. By 31 March 1938, 514 aircraft had been completed, at which point the production line was shuttered. Quantity production had not been entirely without complications; the planned Ar 68G model was cancelled due to the unavailability of a suitable engine.

The Ar 68 entered service with the Luftwaffe in early 1936; one of the first units to receive the type was stationed in East Prussia. One early event that involved two squadrons equipped with the type was the Remilitarization of the Rhineland in March 1936. During 1938, it was decided to dispatch Ar 68s with the Condor Legion to fight in the Spanish Civil War, where it was outclassed by the Soviet Polikarpov I-16. Arado responded by upgrading the engine of the Ar 68E, which soon became the Luftwaffe's most widely used fighter in 1937–1938, before being replaced by the Messerschmitt Bf 109. The last Ar 68s served as night fighters up to the winter of 1939–1940,. Several Ar 68E-1s served with 10. and 11. (Nachtjagd)/JG 72, and a few Ar 68F-1s with 10. (Nachtjagd)/JG 53 after which they served as fighter-trainers until 1944.

== Variants ==
Data from: Prototype V suffix style

Ar 68V1
Prototype, powered by a 492 kW (660 hp) BMW VI engine. First flight in 1934.
Ar 68a (D-IKIN)
First prototype. 1 x 478 kW (641 hp) BMW VId V-12.
Ar 68b (D-IVUS)
Second prototype. 1 x 455 kW (610 hp) Jumo 210A inverted V-12.
Ar 68c (D-IBAS)
Third prototype. 1 x 455 kW (610 hp) Jumo 210A inverted V-12.
Ar 68d (D-ITAR)
Fourth prototype. 1 x 478 kW (641 hp) BMW VId V-12.
Ar 68V4
The fourth prototype (Ar 68d), redesignated after the Reichsluftfahrtministerium (RLM/German Aviation Ministry) introduced the standardised Versuchs (research) number system.
Ar 68e (D-ITEP)
Fifth prototype. 1 x 507 kW (680 hp) Jumo 210Da inverted V-12.
Ar 68V5
The fifth prototype (Ar 68e), redesignated after the RLM introduced the standardised Versuchs (research) number system.
Ar 68E
First type to enter Luftwaffe service, powered by a 455 kW (610 hp) Junkers Jumo 210Ea, at sea level for 5 minutes, 500 kW (671 hp) at 3,800 m (12,467 ft).
Ar 68F
Interim production, powered by a BMW VI 7.3Z; 559 kW (750 hp)) at sea level for 1 minute, 410 kW (550 hp)) at 1,000 m (3,281 ft), awaiting supply of Jumo 210 engines.
Ar 68G
Abortive attempt to fit a supercharged 500 kW (671 hp) BMW VI.
Ar 68H (D-ISIX)
Only a single prototype was built, powered by a 634 kW (850 hp)) BMW 132Da nine-cylinder supercharged air-cooled radial. It had two additional machine guns in the upper wing and had an enclosed cockpit, the first Arado aircraft to be so treated.

== Operators ==
Germany

- Luftwaffe

Spain

- Spanish Air Force

== Specifications (Ar 68F) ==
Data from Warplanes of the Third Reich, Flugzeug-Typenbuch 1936

General characteristics

- Crew: one
- Length: 9.5 m (31 ft 2 in)
- Upper wingspan: 11 m (36 ft 1 in)
- Lower wingspan: 8 m (26 ft 3 in)
- Height: 3.3 m (10 ft 10 in)
- Aspect ratio: 6.1
- Empty weight: 1,600 kg (3,527 lb)
- Gross weight: 2,020 kg (4,453 lb)
- Fuel capacity: main tank:200 L (53 US gal; 44 imp gal); oil tank:27 L (7.1 US gal; 5.9 imp gal)
- Powerplant: 1 × BMW VI V-12 liquid-cooled piston engine, 541 kW (725 hp)
- Propellers: 2-bladed wooden fixed pitch propeller, 3.1 m (10 ft 2 in) diameter

Performance

- Maximum speed: 330 km/h (210 mph, 180 kn) at sea level
- Landing Speed: 97 km/h (60 mph; 52 kn)
- Range: 500 km (310 mi, 270 nmi)
- Service ceiling: 7,400 m (24,300 ft)
- Rate of climb: 12.6 m/s (2,480 ft/min)
- Time to altitude: 6,000 m (19,685 ft) in 16 minutes
- Wing loading: 74 kg/m^{2} (15 lb/sq ft)

Armament

- Guns: 2 × 7.92 millimetres (0.312 in) MG 17 machine guns with 500 r.p.g. (rounds per gun)
- Bombs: Up to 6 × 10 kg (22 lb) SC 10 fragmentation bombs

== See also ==
Related development

- Arado Ar 64

Aircraft of comparable role, configuration, and era

- Blériot-SPAD S.510
- Fairey Fantôme
- Fiat CR.32
- Fiat CR.42
- Gloster Gladiator
- Grumman F3F
- Heinkel He 51
- Kawasaki Ki-10

Related lists

- List of interwar military aircraft
- List of World War II military aircraft of Germany
- List of military aircraft of Germany
- List of fighter aircraft
