= Arado SD III =

German fighter biplane

SD III

General information
- Type: Fighter
- Manufacturer: Arado Flugzeugwerke
- Designer: Walter Rethel
- Number built: 1

History
- First flight: 1929

The Arado SD III was a fighter biplane developed in Germany in the 1920s. It was developed in parallel with the SD II and shared most of that aircraft's airframe design. The main differences were connected with the powerplant installation, which in turn required a shorter forward fuselage and redesigned undercarriage. Evaluated at Staaken, Rechlin and finally at Lipetsk, it was judged unsuitable for mass production, but the lessons learned from it proved invaluable to Arado in designing the Ar 64 and Ar 65.

== Specifications ==
General characteristics

- Crew: one, pilot
- Length: 7.75 m (25 ft 5 in)
- Wingspan: 9.90 m (32 ft 6 in)
- Height: 3.20 m (10 ft 6 in)
- Wing area: 23.0 m^{2} (248 sq ft)
- Powerplant: 1 × Siemens-Halske licence-built Bristol Jupiter VI , 380 kW (510 hp)

Performance

- Maximum speed: 225 km/h (140 mph, 120 kn)
- Rate of climb: 11.9 m/s (2,340 ft/min)

Armament

- 2 × fixed, forward-firing 7.92 mm (.312 in) machine guns

== See also ==
Aircraft of comparable role, configuration, and era

- Blériot-SPAD S.51
- Gloster Gamecock
- Hawker Woodcock
