= Arado SC II =

SC II

General information
- Type: Civil trainer
- Manufacturer: Arado
- Number built: 10

History
- First flight: 1928

The Arado SC II was a biplane trainer designed and produced by the German aircraft manufacturer Arado.

Developed during the late 1920s, the SC II was based heavily on the preceding SC I. Key changes included the adoption of a more powerful BMW Va inline engine and the enlarged dimensions of the airframe. In early 1928, the prototype, produced by a modifying a SC I, performed its maiden flight. This aircraft, which was lost during an acceptance flight at Warnemünde, demonstrated the unfavourable tendency to tip onto its wings during landings. Despite this, Arado opted to proceed with production.

A total of ten aircraft were produced, the majority of which were flown by the Deutsche Verkehrsfliegerschule (DVF), which operated its aircraft for advanced pilot training and aerial display purposes. At least one SC II is believed to have been operated in China for a time. While in use as a trainer for some time, further sales efforts proved to be fruitless and no further production batches proceeded.

== Development ==
During 1926, the aircraft manufacturer Arado decided to build on its initial range of aircraft and begun work on what would become the SC I trainer aircraft. This cantilevered biplane, which bore considerable similarities to the Dutch Fokker C.IV, was capable of reaching a relatively fast maximum speed of 180 KMPH. A limited production run, which was officially produced for Turkey, ended up being operated by multiple flight schools across Germany that were operated by the Deutsche Verkehrsfliegerschule (DVF).

In the late 1920s, Arado produced an improved derivative of the SC I, designated SC II. This aircraft, which was intended to be flown by advanced trainees. was slightly larger than its predecessor and was powered by a BMW Va inline engine, capable of generating up to 320 hp. The initial prototype, which performed its maiden flight in early 1928, was a modified SC I; it had a relatively short career due to it being destroyed during an acceptance flight, crashing before a group of DVF representatives at Warnemünde, on 24 April 1928.

Nevertheless, the DVF opted to procure the majority of SC IIs produced, although only a single production run of ten aircraft were ever produced. The type was believed to have been used at a variety of locations, including Adlershof, Berlin, and Warnemünde. Individual SC IIs were prominently displayed on several occasions, such as the International Aviation Exhibition in Berlin and the Paris Aero-Salon. The aviation author Jörg Armin Kranzhoff notes that some sources have claimed at least one SC II was delivered to China at one point.

While efforts to encourage orders were undertaken, no additional orders for the SC II were secured. Kranzhoff attributes this lack of demand to several shortcomings in the design, such as the relatively weak structure of its landing gear and the use of a relatively short fixed tail skid, both of which gave the aircraft the undesirable tendencies of veering during landings and even tipping over onto its wings.

== Specifications ==
Data from Jane's all the World's Aircraft 1928

General characteristics

- Crew: 2
- Length: 8.8 m (28 ft 10 in)
- Wingspan: 13.2 m (43 ft 4 in)
- Height: 3.47 m (11 ft 5 in)
- Wing area: 39.98 m^{2} (430.3 sq ft)
- Empty weight: 1,275 kg (2,811 lb)
- Gross weight: 1,985 kg (4,376 lb)
- Powerplant: 1 × BMW Va six-cylinder in-line water-cooled piston engine, 240 kW (320 hp)

Performance

- Maximum speed: 180 km/h (110 mph, 97 kn)
- Service ceiling: 5,000 m (16,000 ft)
- Time to altitude: 1,000 m (3,300 ft) in three minutes and 30 seconds
- Wing loading: 50 kg/m^{2} (10 lb/sq ft)
- Power/mass: 0.1208 kW/kg (0.0735 hp/lb)

== See also ==
Related lists

- List of Interwar military aircraft
