= Arado E.654 =

General information
- Type: Heavy fighter project
- National origin: Germany
- Manufacturer: Arado Flugzeugwerke
- Number built: Not produced

The Arado E.654 was a German heavy fighter project by Arado Flugzeugwerke, its design created by Arado's Chief Designer Walter Blume.

== Design ==
Designed by Walter Blume, E.654 used a widened variant on the fuselage of the Arado Ar 240 so that it could mount two DB 614 or DB 627 engines inside the fuselage, similar to the Arado E.561. It had a single vertical tailfin with a tailplane. Like the E.561, it was abandoned due to technical issues with the transmission to the wings. It used straight wings with tapering on leading and trailing edges. It used three wheels with a tricycle arrangement, all of which could retract into their specific parts of the aircraft. The cockpit was located between the nose, and had two crew members sitting back-to-back.

== Specifications ==
Data from https://www.militaryfactory.com/aircraft/detail.php?aircraft_id=671

General characteristics

- Crew: 2
- Length: 12.81 m (42 ft 0 in)
- Wingspan: 14.34 m (47 ft 1 in)
- Height: 3.95 m (13 ft 0 in)
- Wing area: 31.3 m^{2} (337 sq ft)
- Powerplant: 2 × Daimler-Benz DB 614 liquid-cooled V-12 piston engines, 1,500 kW (2,000 hp) each or 2x 3,000 hp (2,200 kW) Daimler-Benz DB 627

Armament

- Guns: Six fixed MK 103 cannons in the nose and four turreted MG 131 cannons above the fuselage
