= Arado SC I =

Training aircraft

SC I
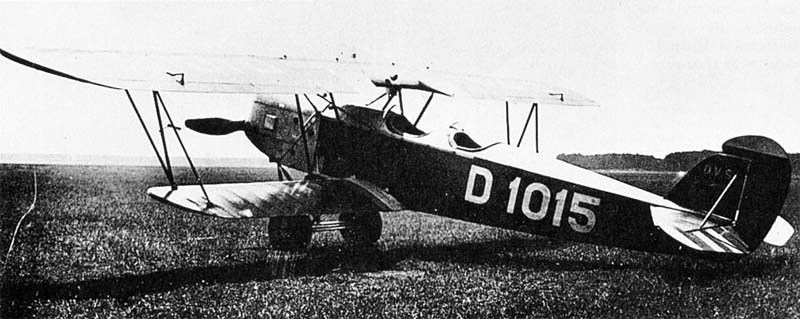

General information
- Type: Civil trainer
- Manufacturer: Arado
- Number built: 14

History
- First flight: 1926

The Arado SC I was a biplane trainer developed in Germany in the 1920s. It was based on the S I, but powered by a far more powerful inline engine. Accordingly, the structure received considerable strengthening. The aircraft was intended for the clandestine military flying school at Lipetsk, but it was not accepted for this service. Instead, a small number were built for the Deutsche Verkehrsfliegerschule.

== Specifications ==
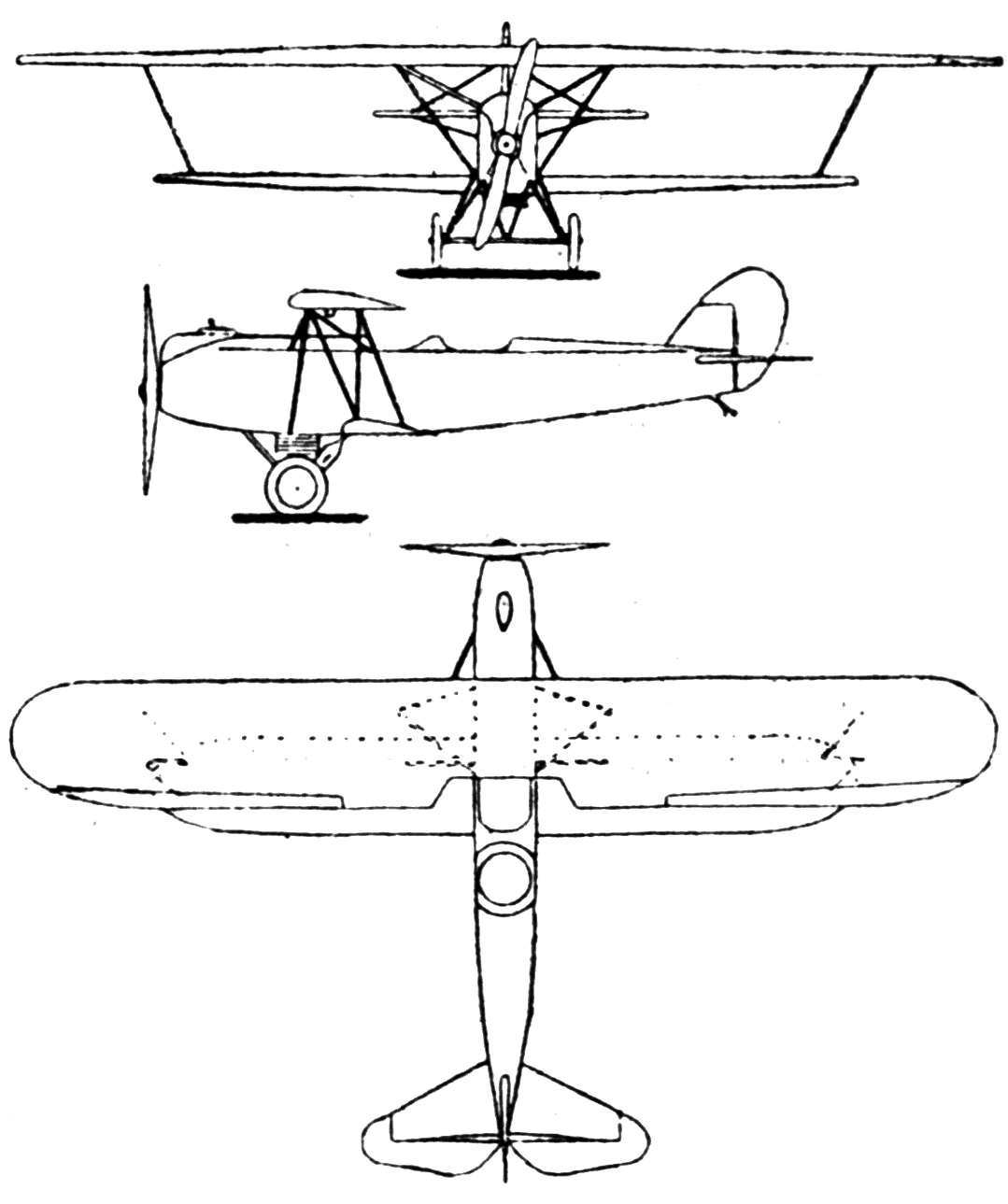
Arado SC.I 3-view drawing from Le Document aéronautique March,1927

General characteristics

- Crew: two, pilot and instructor
- Length: 9.70 m (31 ft 10 in)
- Wingspan: 12.92 m (42 ft 3 in)
- Height: 3.10 m (10 ft 2 in)
- Wing area: 29.3 m^{2} (315 sq ft)
- Empty weight: 1,000 kg (2,205 lb)
- Gross weight: 1,500 kg (3,309 lb)
- Powerplant: 1 × BMW IV , 170 kW (230 hp)

Performance

- Maximum speed: 180 km/h (110 mph, 96 kn)
- Service ceiling: 5,200 m (17,100 ft)

== See also ==
Related lists

- List of Interwar military aircraft
