= Blume Bl.502 =

Bl.502
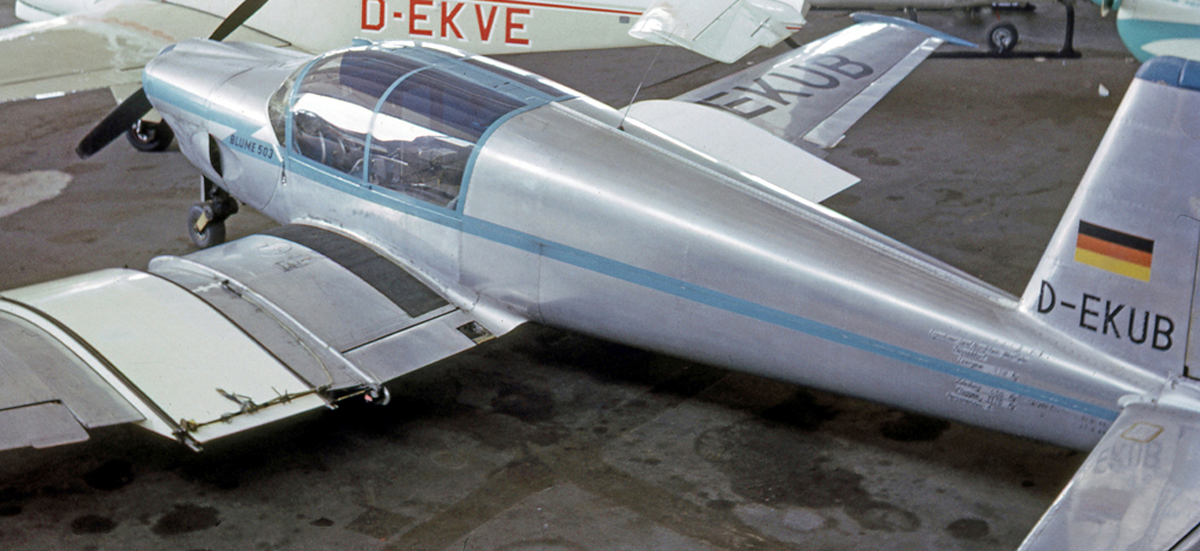
- The sole Blume Bl.503 to be completed pictured at Munich's Riem Airport in 1965

General information
- Type: Civil utility aircraft
- National origin: West Germany
- Manufacturer: Walter Blume
- Designer: Walter Blume
- Primary user: The designer
- Number built: 2

History
- First flight: 14 March 1957

The Blume Bl.500, Bl.502, and Bl.503 were a family of four-seat light aircraft designed in West Germany by Dr Walter Blume in the late 1950s.

== Design and development ==
Derived from his Arado Ar 79, the basic design shared by all models was that of a conventional low-wing cantilever monoplane with retractable tricycle undercarriage and all-metal construction. The Bl.500 prototype was built for Blume at the Focke-Wulf plant and was powered by a Lycoming O-320 engine of 112 kW (150 hp). This led to a modified version, the Bl.502 that achieved German type certification and was offered for sale alongside the generally similar Bl.503 with a more powerful engine. However, no orders were forthcoming and Blume abandoned the project.

== Operational history ==
The final example of the design, the Blume Bl.503 was still active in 1965.

== Variants ==
Bl.500
prototype
Bl.502
intended production version with Lycoming O-320
Bl.503
proposed production version with Lycoming O-360. A single example was completed.

== Specifications (Bl.502) ==
Data from Jane's All The World's Aircraft 1961–62

General characteristics

- Crew: 1
- Capacity: 3 passengers
- Length: 8.15 m (26 ft 9 in)
- Wingspan: 10.50 m (34 ft 5 in)
- Height: 2.40 m (7 ft 10 in)
- Wing area: 15.0 m^{2} (161 sq ft)
- Aspect ratio: 7.35:1
- Empty weight: 670 kg (1,477 lb)
- Gross weight: 1,120 kg (2,469 lb)
- Powerplant: 1 × Lycoming O-320 air-cooled flat-four engine, 110 kW (150 hp)

Performance

- Maximum speed: 250 km/h (160 mph, 130 kn)
- Cruise speed: 220 km/h (140 mph, 120 kn) (70% power)
- Range: 900 km (560 mi, 490 nmi)
- Endurance: 4.1 hr
- Service ceiling: 4,800 m (15,700 ft)
- Rate of climb: 5.11 m/s (1,005 ft/min)
- Takeoff distance to 15 m (50 ft): 375 m (1,230 ft)

== See also ==
Related development

- Arado Ar 79
