= Arado Ar 81 =

Prototype dive bomber by Arado

Ar 81
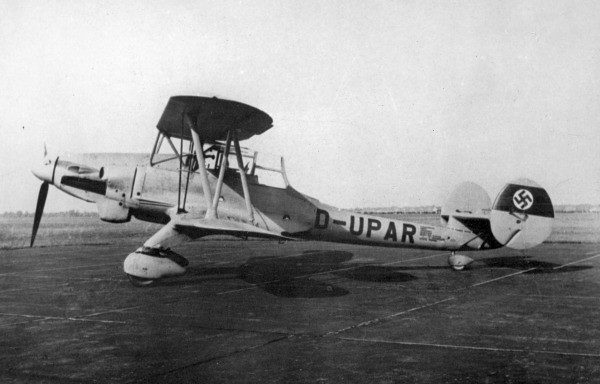

General information
- Type: Dive bomber
- National origin: Germany
- Manufacturer: Arado Flugzeugwerke
- Designer: Walter Blume
- Number built: 3

History
- First flight: 1935

The Arado Ar 81 was a German prototype dive bomber. Because the Reich Air Ministry decided to purchase the competing Junkers Ju 87, only three prototypes of the Ar 81 were completed.

== Background ==
In 1934, the Reich Air Ministry or RLM (Reichsluftfahrtministerium) initiated two parallel programmes to build new dive bombers for the German air force, to replace the Heinkel He 50. The first, the so-called Sofort or immediate program, aimed to develop an interim dive bomber, and resulted in the production of the Henschel Hs 123. The second, Sturzbomber program, aimed to produce a more definitive aircraft. In January 1935 the formal requirements for this were sent to German aircraft manufacturers. These had been written around the Junkers Ju 87, of which the first prototype was already under construction. Indeed, the Luftwaffe had already given Junkers an order for 118 aircraft. Nevertheless, two manufacturers received an order to deliver three prototypes of their competing projects: The Heinkel He 118 and the Arado Ar 81. The Blohm & Voss Ha 137 competed as a private venture.

== Design and development ==
The Ar 81 was the only one of the competitors to be conceived as a biplane. Reportedly this was on the advice of Ernst Udet. There seems to have been some doubt at Arado about the use of this outdated configuration, for alternative designs were made for a monoplane with an inverted gull wing. However, in the end the Ar 81 was built as an all-metal biplane. It was a pleasant design, which looked rather more streamlined than the first prototype of the Ju 87, and was slightly smaller and lighter. The slender fuselage had a closely cowled Junkers Jumo 210C engine in front, with a large radiator bath below it. The wings were relatively short in span and connected by N-struts outboard. Behind the wings, the crew of two sat in a roomy cockpit with a semi-enclosed canopy, back to back. The rear of the cockpit canopy was open to allow the gunner to freely aim his defensive machine gun. The fixed main landing gear legs were fitted with streamlined covers and spats for the wheels.

The tail section was very slender, and the tail of the first prototype, Ar 81V1, consisted of a tailplane with some dihedral that carried two outboard fins and rudders, to improve the field of fire of the tail gunner. However, testing from the end of 1935 onward revealed serious stability problems. The second prototype was given a raised tailplane without dihedral, braced with struts, but this did not cure the issues, and the third prototype had a completely reworked tail, with a boom structure of larger cross-section that carried a tall single tailfin and a large rudder. This prototype also had a Jumo 210Ca engine that drove a two-bladed variable-pitch propeller, instead of the three-bladed fixed-pitch unit fitted to the first two prototypes.

The defensive armament of a single fixed MG 17 machine gun, intended to be fitted in the engine cowling, and an MG 15 defensive gun in the rear cockpit, was probably never installed. The same is claimed for the special bomb rack below the fuselage, intended to swing a 250 kg bomb clear of the propeller in a diving attack. However, test pilot Kurt Starck claimed that during the 1936 trials, the Ar 81 was the only aircraft capable of dropping a 500 kg bomb in a vertical dive, which indicates that a bomb rack must have been fitted.

In its developed Ar 81V3 form, the Arado design was in several aspects better than the Ju 87 prototypes, including level speed, manoeuvrability, range, and especially rate of climb: It reached 4,000 metres (13,000 ft) in 11 minutes, while the Junkers design needed 23 minutes. However, the Ju 87 was a more modern design and its performance could be improved by installing more powerful engines, while the Ar 81 had less development potential. Due to the delay involved in redesigning the tail, the Ar 81V3 made its appearance only in the spring of 1936, when the RLM had already chosen the Ju 87.

== Specifications (Ar 81 V3) ==
Data from Aircraft of the Third Reich

General characteristics

- Crew: 2
- Length: 11.65 m (38 ft 3 in)
- Wingspan: 11.2 m (36 ft 9 in)
- Height: 3.57 m (11 ft 9 in)
- Wing area: 35.6 m^{2} (383 sq ft)
- Empty weight: 1,925 kg (4,244 lb)
- Gross weight: 3,070 kg (6,768 lb)
- Powerplant: 1 × Junkers Jumo 210Ca inverted V-12 liquid-cooled piston engine, 480 kW (640 hp) at 2,700 m (8,900 ft)
- Propellers: 2-bladed variable-pitch propeller

Performance

- Maximum speed: 345 km/h (214 mph, 186 kn) at 4,000 m (13,000 ft)
- Range: 693 km (431 mi, 374 nmi) at 4,000 m (13,000 ft)
- Service ceiling: 7,700 m (25,300 ft)
- Time to altitude: at 4,000 m (13,000 ft) in 11 minutes

Armament

- Guns:
  - 1 × 7.92 mm (0.312 in) MG 17 machine gun fixed in the engine cowling,
  - 1 × 7.92 mm (0.312 in) MG 15 machine gun flexible in the rear cockpit
- Bombs: 1 × 250 kg (550 lb) bomb on a swinging crutch under the fuselage
