= Arado E.500 =

General information
- Type: Heavy fighter
- National origin: German Reich (Nazi period) Deutsches Reich
- Manufacturer: Arado Flugzeugwerke
- Number built: Not produced

History
- Manufactured: –
- Introduction date: –
- First flight: –

The Arado E.500 was an aircraft designed by Arado Flugzeugwerke in 1936 as a heavy fighter and ground attack aircraft. Although a full-scale mockup was produced, no units were ever produced.

== Description ==
The Arado E.500 was a four-man heavy fighter and ground attack fighter that was designed by prominent aircraft designer Walter Blume and Kurt Bornemann. It was originally designed in 1935 and development continued as far as the construction of a full-scale mockup, but never entered mass-scale production.

The design called for a twin boom design, with each of the booms housing a Daimler-Benz DB 600 series liquid-cooled piston engine as well as the rear-facing retractable main landing gear wheels and a tail surface mounted on the outboard section. The short center-mounted fuselage housed four crew members, including a pilot, copilot/gunner/observer, and two turret gunners. It had two gun turrets, one on the dorsal surface and one on the ventral surface, each with a pair of 20 mm Rheinmetall-Borsig 202 cannons. Each of the turrets had a complete 360-degree range of motion, and could aim the guns from horizontal to a full vertical position. The bottom turret was operated by a gunner lying prone in an under-fuselage trough and using a periscope to aim. A third gunner operated fixed forward-facing guns in the nose of the aircraft. Fuel tanks were located in the rear of the fuselage and at least one variant was designed with an internal bomb bay with a capacity of two 250kg bombs.

Arado developed a 1:1 mock-up; however, it did not find the interest of the Technical Office of the Ministry of Aviation. The project was subsequently discontinued.

== Specifications ==
General characteristics

- Crew: Four
- Powerplant: 2 × DB 603

Performance Armament

- Guns:
  - Two Rh-LB-202 20 mm cannons in dorsal turret
  - Two Rh-LB-202 20 mm cannons in ventral gun position controlled by periscope
