= Arado Flugzeugwerke =

German aircraft manufacturer in the First and Second World Wars

Arado Flugzeugwerke was a German aircraft manufacturer, originally established as the Warnemünde factory of the Flugzeugbau Friedrichshafen firm, which produced land-based military aircraft and seaplanes during the First and Second World Wars.

== History ==
With its parent company, it ceased operations following the First World War, when restrictions on German aviation were created by the Treaty of Versailles. In 1921, the factory was purchased by Heinrich Lübbe, who is said to have assisted Anthony Fokker in the creation of the pioneering Stangensteuerung synchronization gear system during 1914–1915, and re-commenced aircraft construction for export. Walter Rethel, previously of Kondor and Fokker, was appointed head designer. In 1925, the company joined the Arado Handelsgesellschaft ("Arado trading firm") that was founded by the industrialist Hugo Stinnes Jr. for covering up illegal trade with military equipment. When the Nazi government came to power in Germany in 1933, Lübbe took control of the company. Just prior to that, Walter Blume, formerly of Albatros, replaced Rethel.

Arado achieved early prominence as a supplier to the Luftwaffe with the Arado Ar 66, which became one of the standard Luftwaffe trainers right into World War II. The firm also produced some of the Luftwaffe's first fighter aircraft, the Ar 65 and Ar 68. In 1936, the RLM (Reichsluftfahrtministerium – "Reich Aviation Ministry") insisted that, as a show of loyalty, Lübbe should join the Nazi party. When he refused, he was arrested and forced to sell the company to the state. It was renamed to the more specific (and accurate) Arado Flugzeugwerke GmbH and was placed under the direction of Erich Serno, and Felix Wagenführ, himself a former IdFlieg officer in World War I.

When Germany invaded Poland, instigating World War II, two more Arado products rose to prominence, the Ar 96, which became the Luftwaffe's most used trainer, and the Ar 196 a reconnaissance seaplane that became standard equipment on all larger German warships. Unfortunately for Arado, most of their other designs were passed over in favour of stronger products from their competitors, such as Germany's only heavy bomber fielded during the war, the Heinkel He 177, for which Arado was the primary subcontractor. Perhaps Arado's most celebrated aircraft of the war was the Ar 234, the first jet-powered bomber. Too late to have any real effect on the outcome of the conflict, it was nevertheless a sign of things to come.

Until their liberation in April 1945 by the Soviet army, 1,012 slave laborers from Freiberg, a sub-camp of the Flossenbürg concentration camp, worked at the Arado factory, beginning with the first trainload of 249 prisoners arriving in August 1944. The prisoners were mostly Polish Jewish women and girls sent to Freiberg from Auschwitz.

Arado also licence-built various versions of, and components for the Focke-Wulf Fw 190.

In 1945, the company was liquidated and broken up.

The Ar 96 continued to be produced in Czechoslovakia by Zlin for many years after the war as the C.2B.

== Aircraft ==
Arado aircraft include:

- Arado L 1, sportsplane
- Arado L II, sportsplane
- Arado S I, civil trainer
- Arado S III, civil trainer
- Arado SC I, civil trainer
- Arado SC II, civil trainer
- Arado SD I, prototype fighter
- Arado SD II, prototype fighter
- Arado SD III, prototype fighter
- Arado SSD I, prototype fighter seaplane
- Arado V I – airliner
- Arado W 2 – civil trainer seaplane
- Arado Ar 64, fighter (biplane)
- Arado Ar 65, fighter/trainer (biplane – re-engined Ar 64)
- Arado Ar 66, trainer + night fighter
- Arado Ar 67, fighter (biplane) (prototype)
- Arado Ar 68, fighter (biplane)
- Arado Ar 69, trainer (biplane) (prototypes), 1933
- Arado Ar 76, fighter (biplane) + trainer
- Arado Ar 77, trainer + light fighter
- Arado Ar 79, trainer + civilian aircraft
- Arado Ar 80, fighter (prototype)
- Arado Ar 81, two-seat biplane (prototype)(1936)
- Arado Ar 95, coastal patrol + attack (biplane seaplane)
- Arado Ar 96, trainer
- Arado Ar 195, carrier based torpedo bomber
- Arado Ar 196, ship-borne reconnaissance + coastal patrol (seaplane)
- Arado Ar 197, naval fighter (biplane - derived from Ar 68)
- Arado Ar 198, reconnaissance
- Arado Ar 199, seaplane trainer
- Arado Ar 231, fold-wing U-boat reconnaissance aircraft (prototype)
- Arado Ar 232, transport
- Arado Ar 233, seaplane(concept), 1940
- Arado Ar 234 Blitz ('Lightning'), bomber (jet-engined)
- Arado Ar 240, heavy fighter + attack
- Arado Ar 296, trainer, similar to Ar 96 but all wood construction
- Arado Ar 340, medium bomber
- Arado Ar 396, trainer
- Arado Ar 432, transport, similar to Ar 232 but mixed wood and metal construction
- Arado Ar 440, heavy fighter + attack
- Arado Ar 532, cancelled transport

Major internal World War II projects under the RLM:

- Arado E.240
- Arado E.300
- Arado E.310
- Arado E.340
- Arado E.370
- Arado E.371
- Arado E.375
- Arado E.377
- Arado E.377ª
- Arado E.380
- Arado E.381/I
- Arado E.381/II
- Arado E.381/III
- Arado E.385
- Arado E.390
- Arado E.395
- Arado E.396
- Arado E.401
- Arado E.430
- Arado E.432
- Arado E.433
- Arado E.440
- Arado E.441
- Arado E.470
- Arado E.480
- Arado E.490
- Arado E.500
- Arado E.530
- Arado E.532
- Arado E.555
- Arado E.560
- Arado E.561
- Arado E.580
- Arado E.581.4
- Arado E.581.5
- Arado E.583
- Arado E.625
- Arado E.632
- Arado E.651
- Arado E.654
- Arado Ar Projekt II jet fighter

== See also ==
- List of RLM aircraft designations
