= Arado Projekt II =

Arado Ar Projekt II

General information
- Type: Night fighter project
- National origin: Germany
- Manufacturer: Arado Flugzeugwerke
- Number built: Not produced

The Arado Ar Projekt II was a German jet night fighter project of Arado Flugzeugwerke, which was undertaken in March 1945.

== Design ==
The designs marked that the aircraft would contain two crew, and had ejector seats. It had 35 degree swept wings, and two HeS 011 or BMW 003-A engines underneath. It also had four nose-mounted MK108 cannon.

This design was based on the successful Ar 234 and was therefore ready for serial production in the shortest possible time, however could not start due to the end of the war.
