= Arado E.580 =

German World War II jet fighter design

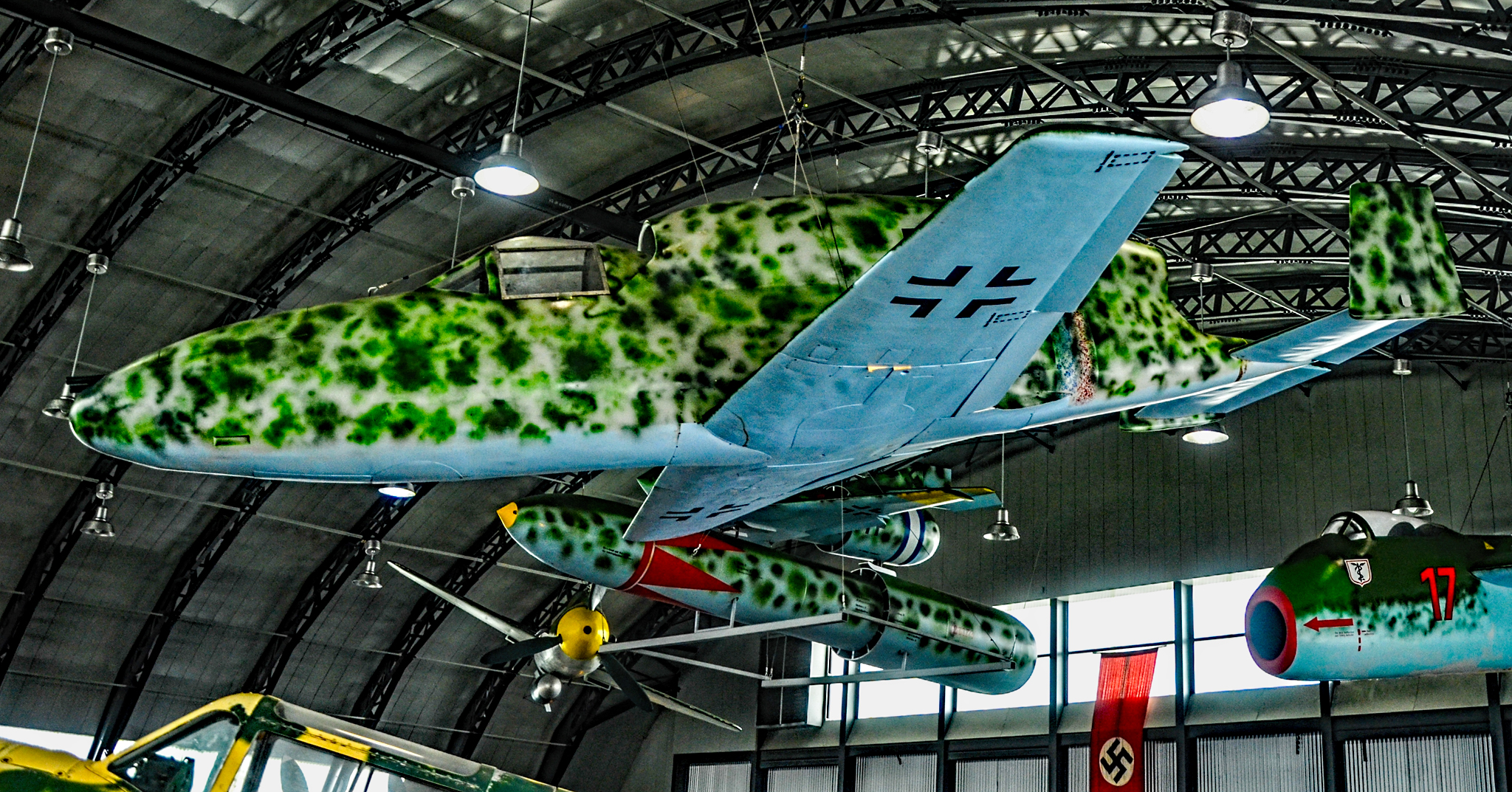

General information
- Type: Jet fighter project
- National origin: Germany
- Manufacturer: Arado Flugzeugwerke
- Number built: Not produced

The Arado E.580 was a German World War II jet fighter design. Based on a design from 1943, the E.580 was then altered for the Volksjäger competition.

== Design ==
The Arado E.580 was a proposed jet-powered lightweight fighter designed in September 1944 by the Arado Flugzeugwerke company. The design specifications were for a lightweight fighter, powered by a single BMW 003A-1 jet engine, and needed to be designed within a few days. The final design was for a single fuselage aircraft with a low-mounted unswept wing and a single jet engine mounted behind the pilot's canopy on the dorsal side of the fuselage. With the engine mounting position behind the pilot, the canopy partially obstructed the air intake. It had tail unit with twin fins and rudders. The fuselage was made of steel, and the wing was made of wood, and the aircraft had an empty weight of 1,955 kilograms (4,310 lb). The aircraft was 8 metres (26 ft) long and 2.5 metres (8.2 ft) high. The wingspan was 7.75 metres (25.4 ft) with a total wing area of 10 square metres (110 sq ft).

The aircraft was expected to have a maximum speed of 750 kilometres per hour (470 mph) at 6,000 metres (20,000 ft) altitude, and a service ceiling of 12,000 metres (39,000 ft). It was expected to be able to climb to 6,000 m in 7.4 minutes, and to 10,000 m in 17.9 minutes. Fuel endurance at 100% thrust was designed for 35 minutes at 6,000 m with a fuel capacity of 500 kilograms (1,100 lb). Armament was designed to be two 30mm MK 108 cannons mounted in the nose.

The conclusion of World War II ended further development of the aircraft, and the design was never completely finished.

== Replica ==
An exhibit on display at the Military Aviation Museum in Virginia Beach, Virginia is claimed to be a replica.
