= Arado SD I =

SD I
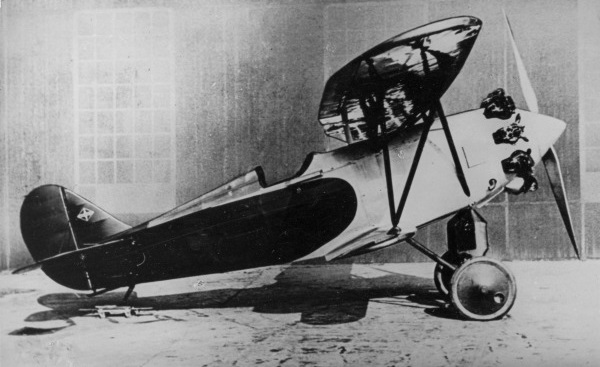

General information
- Type: Fighter
- Manufacturer: Arado Flugzeugwerke
- Designer: Walter Rethel
- Number built: 2

History
- First flight: 27 October 1927

The Arado SD I was a fighter biplane, developed in Germany in the 1920s. It was intended to equip the clandestine air force that Germany was assembling at Lipetsk. The layout owed something to designer Walter Rethel's time with Fokker. Of conventional configuration, the SD I featured a welded steel tube frame, metal-covered ahead of the cockpit, and fabric-covered aft of it. The wooden sesquiplane wings were braced with N-type interplane struts, without any wires - a typical Fokker feature.

In flight, performance and handling proved disappointing at anything but very low speeds. Questions also arose as to the structural soundness of the design, and development was terminated very soon thereafter.

== Specifications ==
General characteristics

- Crew: one, pilot
- Length: 6.75 m (22 ft 2 in)
- Wingspan: 8.40 m (27 ft 7 in)
- Height: 2.90 m (9 ft 6 in)
- Wing area: 16.8 m^{2} (181 sq ft)
- Empty weight: 850 kg (1,870 lb)
- Gross weight: 1,230 kg (2,710 lb)
- Powerplant: 1 × Bristol Jupiter , 317 kW (425 hp)

Performance

- Maximum speed: 275 km/h (171 mph, 149 kn)
- Service ceiling: 8,000 m (26,200 ft)
- Rate of climb: 10.4 m/s (2,050 ft/min)

Armament

- 2 × fixed, forward-firing 7.92 mm (.312 in) machine guns
