= Arado Ar 79 =

1938 sportplane by Arado

Ar 79
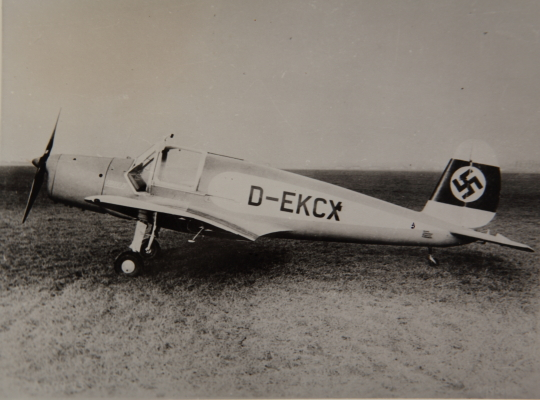

General information
- Type: Aerobatic trainer
- Manufacturer: Arado

History
- Manufactured: 72
- Introduction date: 1938
- First flight: 20 April 1938

The Arado Ar 79 was an aerobatic two-seat trainer and touring aircraft designed and produced by the German aircraft manufacturer Arado. It was the final civilian aircraft developed by the company.

The Ar 79 was developed during the mid-1930s as a successor to the Arado L I and Arado L II touring aircraft by the aeronautical engineer Walter Rethel. He designed a monoplane with a retractable tailwheel undercarriage that featured mixed construction, the forward fuselage was composed of fabric over steel tube while the rear fuselage was a monocoque structure. The Ar 79 was a relatively durable, light weight, and economical aircraft that possessed favourable flight characteristics. It had a fully-glazed cabin integral with the fuselage, a dedicated luggage compartment, and a pair of fuel tanks within the fuselage. While primarily intended as a civil aircraft, its use as a military trainer was not excluded.

First flying in April 1938, the Ar 79 promptly set multiple world speed records in their class that same year and was praised by high-ranking Nazi officials. Various German figured purchased individual aircraft, including Ernst Udet, Hanna Reitsch, Heinz Rühmann, Alfried Krupp von Bohlen und Halbach, and Stephan von Horthy. At least one was still airworthy as late as 1955.

== Development ==
During the 1920s and early 1930s, the German aircraft manufacturer Arado had entered into the touring aircraft sector with the Arado L I and Arado L II. Their designer, the aeronautical engineer Walter Rethel, sought to develop a more capable successor during the mid 1930s. It is likely that the decision to proceed was strengthened by the position advocated by Hermann Göring, Chief of the Luftwaffe High Command, that Germans should be a nation of fliers; a favourable economic situation in Germany at that time would have also encouraged such undertakings.

Although it drew upon these earlier touring aircraft, the design team decided that this new aircraft, which would be designated Ar 79, would be designed for greater reliability, ruggedness, and economy. To promote the aircraft to civil customers, Arado committed to an extensive advertising campaign as a faster alternative to road and railway travel. Furthermore, while the Ar 79 was principally aimed at the civilian market, the aircraft's development was warmly received and promoted by the Reich Air Ministry, and its potential use for military applications was not ruled out.

The Ar 79 was a purpose-built touring and trainer aircraft, possessing excellent flight characteristics through its use of modern aerodynamic innovations. Through the use of split flaps, it could be flown at unusually slow speeds while, when correctly trimmed, stable hands-off flying could also be readily achieved. The Ar 79 was a fully aerobatic aircraft yet had a relatively low price amongst its contemporaries. Partially due to its light weight construction, the Ar 79 was a fuel-efficient aircraft that was capable of flying in excess of 1000 km without refuelling. Its standard powerplant, a single Hirth HM 504 A2 inline engine capable of 105 hp, was purpose developed for the aircraft and delivered more power than most competing aircraft.

A trade paper advertisement by I.G. Farben in May 1939 took advantage of the record-breaking flight from Libya to India in late 1938 (see § Operational history below) using the flight path as a background, and presented a breakdown of the materials used in the aircraft: wood 38.5%, Elektron (cast lightweight magnesium-aluminium alloy made by a subsidiary of I.G. Farben, used for engine crankcases) 25%, steel 10.5%, glass 8.5%, Dural (aluminium-copper alloy) 5.9%, Hydronalium (aluminium-magnesium alloy for casting, patented by I. G. Farben in 1938, possibly for pistons) 4.9%, fabric 3.2%, paint 2.5%, aluminium 1%.

As shown above, the construction made extensive use of metal; the forward fuselage was composed of steel; aft of the twin-seat cabin, monocoque wooden construction is present. The fully-glazed cabin is fully-integral with the fuselage; entry and egress is via sliding upper section. Dual flight controls and comprehensive instrumentation is present throughout, while favourable external visibility is also provisioned. The Ar 79 has easily removable wings, being attached using only three bolts; they are primarily composed of plywood and fabric. The ailerons, horizontal stabilisers, and rudder comprise a metal framework covered by fabric, while the adjustable tailplane is entirely metal. Fuel is housed in two tanks directly beneath the aircraft's luggage compartment. A manually-cranked retractable landing gear arrangement is used; its relatively wide track, hydraulically actuated brakes, and freely traversing tailwheel provide favourable taxiing tendencies.

== Operational history ==
A pair of prototypes, D-EKCX and D-EHCR, were commenced test flying in April 1938. They quickly drew attention via the setting of multiple world speed records in their class that same year, Specifically, on 15 July, the solo 1,000 km (621.4 mi) at 229.04 km/h (142.32 mph); on 29 July, the 2,000 km (1,242.8 mi) at 227.029 km/h (141.069 mph); and between 29 and 31 December, a modified Ar 79, with a jettisonable 106 L (28 US gal) fuel tank and extra 520 L (140 US gal) tank behind the cabin, completed a non-stop 6,303 km (3,917 mi) flight from Benghazi, Libya to Gaya, India, at an average speed of 160 km/h (100 mph). These achievements were met with the personal praise of several high-ranking Nazi officials, including Göring.

Furthermore, the Ar 79 placed well in numerous air races; on 31 July 1938, one aircraft took first place in race A of the International Air Races held at Frankfurt. Individual aircraft were acquired by various German figures, including Ernst Udet, Hanna Reitsch, Heinz Rühmann, Alfried Krupp von Bohlen und Halbach, and Stephan von Horthy. Numerous aircraft survived the Second World War intact, at least one being airworthy as late as 1955.

== Operators ==
Hungary

- Royal Hungarian Air Force

== Specifications ==

Data from Aircraft of the Third Reich, Flugzeug-Typenbuch. Handbuch der deutschen Luftfahrt 1944

General characteristics

- Crew: two
- Length: 7.6 m (24 ft 11 in)
- Wingspan: 10 m (32 ft 10 in)
- Height: 2.1 m (6 ft 11 in)
- Wing area: 14 m^{2} (150 sq ft)
- Aspect ratio: 7.14
- Empty weight: 460 kg (1,014 lb)
- Max takeoff weight: 760 kg (1,676 lb)
- Fuel capacity: 120 L (32 US gal; 26 imp gal) fuel + 4 L (1.1 US gal; 0.88 imp gal) oil
- Powerplant: 1 × Hirth HM 504A-2 inverted 4-cyl. air-cooled in-line piston engine 105 PS (104 hp; 77 kW)
- Propellers: 2-bladed fixed pitch propeller, 2 m (6 ft 7 in) diameter

Performance

- Maximum speed: 230 km/h (140 mph, 120 kn) at sea level
- Cruise speed: 205 km/h (127 mph, 111 kn) 75 PS (74 hp; 55 kW) at sea level
- Range: 1,025 km (637 mi, 553 nmi)
- Endurance: Five hours and 18 minutes
- Service ceiling: 5,300 m (17,400 ft) solo

4,500 m (14,800 ft) dual

- g limits: +10.8 (ultimate)
- Rate of climb: 4 m/s (790 ft/min)
- Time to altitude:

- 1,000 m (3,300 ft) in three minutes and 48 seconds
- 2,000 m (6,600 ft) in eight minutes and 24 seconds

- Wing loading: 57 kg/m^{2} (12 lb/sq ft)
- Power/mass: 0.1314 PS/kg (0.0588 hp/lb; 0.0966 kW/kg)
- Fuel consumption: 11 L/km (4.7 US gal/mi; 3.9 imp gal/mi)
- Oil consumption: 0.15 L/km (0.064 US gal/mi; 0.053 imp gal/mi)
- Take-off run: 180 m (590 ft)
