= Arado E.583 =

Type of aircraft

General information
- Type: Night fighter twinjet project
- Manufacturer: Arado Flugzeugwerke
- Number built: Not produced

The Arado E.583 (Arado Ar P.I ) was a project design from 1945 for a jet-powered night fighter aircraft of the German manufacturer Arado Flugzeugwerke.

== History ==
The design of the E.583 goes back to the E.581, an earlier project by Arado, in which design variants for a single-beam, tailless night fighter were also examined. The starting point for the E.581 was again the studies in connection with the project E.555 for a multi-beam long-range bomber. However, due to the long inlet and the large hull surface, the Heinkel HeS-011 jet engine of the E.581, which was integrated into the fuselage, could only expect inadequate performance in the high-speed sector.

Arado then created two new project designs in accordance with the guidelines issued in January 1945 for the optimal solution of a night fighter. Under the overall designation E.583, the studies Ar-I and Ar-II - also referred to as Project I and II - were presented at the same time.

The Ar-I was based on the draft E.581-5, but had much larger dimensions. The experts criticized on 20./21. March 1945 again the resistance generating engine intakes and large surfaces. Arado then improved the design so that a third crew member and a larger amount of fuel could be included. A third variant received smaller and more swept wings. Allegedly, it is said to have served as inspiration for the US Vought F7U-3 Cutlass. However, head of the aerodynamic research department of Vought, William C. Schoolfield, denied that any orientation towards German research has taken place.

The Ar-II was regarded as an easier to implement night fighter. The design had swept wings and was strongly based on the Arado Ar 234 and the study TEW 16 / 43–23. The maximum speed was calculated at 775 km / h, lower than that of the Ar-I.

== Construction ==
The Ar I was designed as a tailless aircraft, in which the ailerons also served as horizontal stabilizer. The two rudders were each placed on top of the wings.

== Technical data ==
Data from Arado E.583

General characteristics

- Crew: Two
- Length: 12.95 m (42 ft 6 in)
- Wingspan: 18.38 m (60 ft 4 in)
- Swept wingspan: 35 m (114 ft 10 in) swept
- Max takeoff weight: 24,000 kg (52,911 lb)
- Powerplant: 2 × He-S011 semi-hulled jet engines

Performance

- Maximum speed: 810 km/h (500 mph, 440 kn)
- Range: 3,600 km (2,200 mi, 1,900 nmi) with 2,000 kg (4,400 lb) bomb load
- Service ceiling: 13 m (43 ft)

Armament

- Guns:
  - Two MK 213/30 autocannons in the fuselage nose and two as rear armament
  - two MK 108 autocannons as oblique armament

== See also ==
List of aircraft types
