= Arado Ar 69 =

1933 German school and sports plane

Ar 69

General information
- Type: Trainer
- National origin: Germany
- Manufacturer: Arado
- Number built: 3

History
- First flight: 1933

The Arado Ar 69 was a two-seat German beginner's school and sport biplane with an open cockpit, developed in 1933 by Arado Flugzeugwerke.

== Design & development ==
Three prototypes were built, the Ar 69 V1 and Ar 69 V2 were powered by 78 kW (105 hp) Hirth HM 504A engines and the V3 was powered by a BMW Bramo Sh.14a radial engine. Featuring swept wings constructed from wood, and a welded steel tube fuselage, the V1 and V2 represented the planned Ar 69A production aircraft, and the V3 would have evolved into the Ar69B production model. No production aircraft were built, due to the success of the rival Focke-Wulf Fw 44 Stieglitz.

== Specifications (Ar 69 V3) ==
Data from , Flugzeug-Typenbuch 1941

General characteristics

- Crew: two
- Length: 7.2 m (23 ft 7 in)
- Wingspan: 9 m (29 ft 6 in)
- Height: 2.7 m (8 ft 10 in)
- Wing area: 20.7 m^{2} (223 sq ft)
- Empty weight: 540 kg (1,190 lb)
- Max takeoff weight: 680 kg (1,499 lb)
- Powerplant: 1 × BMW Bramo Sh.14a 7-cyl. air-cooled radial piston engine, 112 kW (150 hp)
- Propellers: 2-bladed fixed pitch wooden propeller

Performance

- Maximum speed: 184 km/h (114 mph, 99 kn) at sea level
- Cruise speed: 150 km/h (93 mph, 81 kn) at optimum altitude
- Landing Speed: 72 km/h (45 mph; 39 kn)
- Service ceiling: 5,600 m (18,400 ft)
- Time to altitude: 1,000 m (3,280 ft) in 3 minutes 24 seconds
- Wing loading: 32.85 kg/m^{2} (6.73 lb/sq ft)
- Power/mass: 4.54 kg/hp
