= Arado E.530 =

Proposed aircraft

General information
- Type: Schnellbomber
- National origin: Germany
- Manufacturer: Arado Flugzeugwerke
- Status: Not Constructed

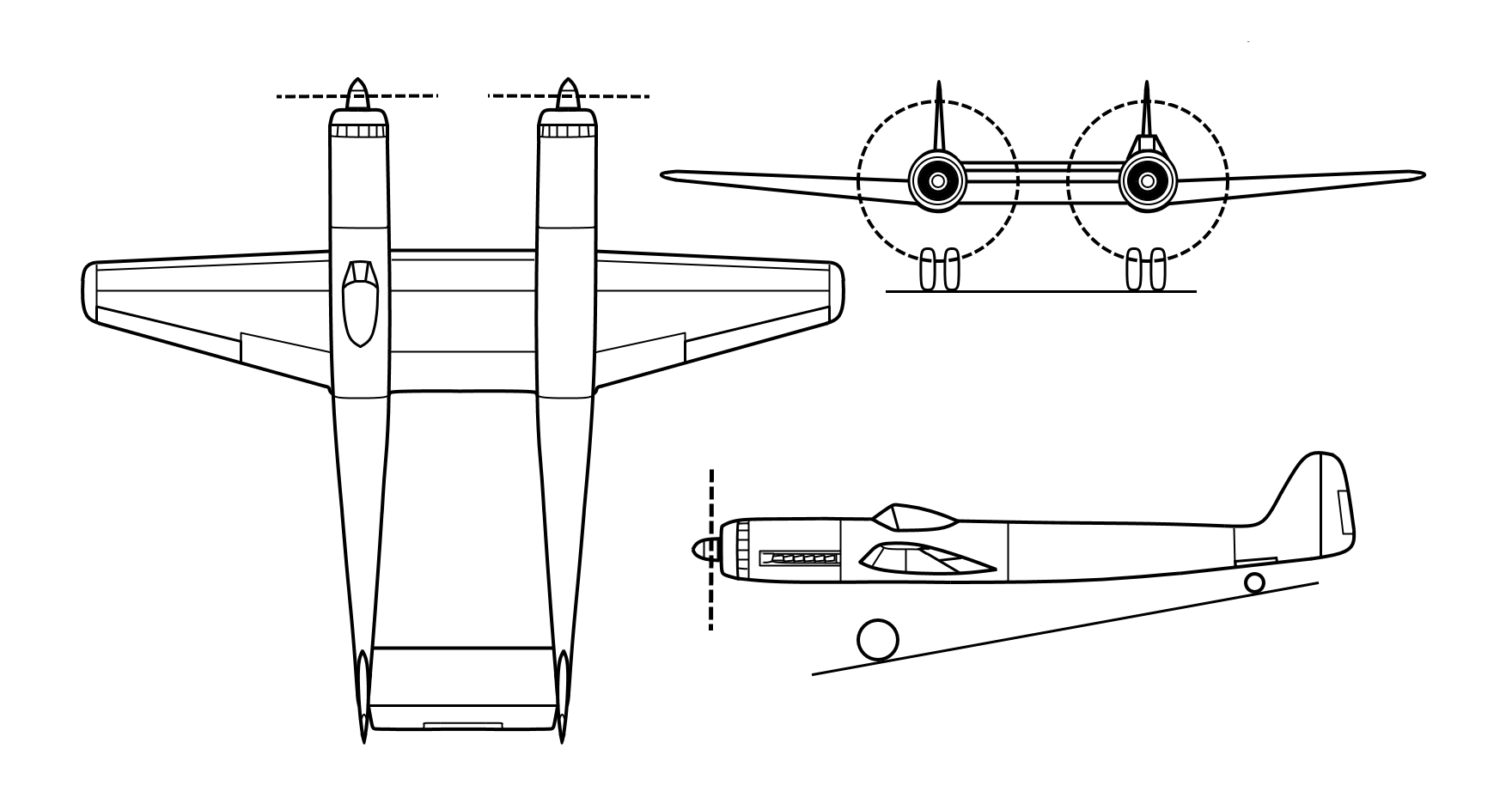
Simple schematic for the Arado E.530

The Arado E.530 was a proposed twin-engine Schnellbomber design by Arado Flugzeugwerke. It was to have a pressurized cockpit in the port fuselage and contained one 500 kg bomb, but was otherwise unarmed. It was abandoned due to having no advantage over the Messerschmitt equivalent.

== Design ==
The Arado Ar E.530 was designed to be a single-seat fast light bomber (Schnellbomber) or as a ground attack airplane (Kampfzerstörer). It had a twin boom, twin engine design, with the pilot seated in a pressurized cockpit in the left boom. The designed wingspan was 16.25 metres (53.3 ft) and each of the fuselage booms were 14.15 metres (46.4 ft) long. Retractable rear-facing landing gear was mounted behind the engines, with tail wheels. The aircraft was designed to be powered by two powerful Daimler-Benz DB 603G V12 engines, with a top speed of 770 kilometres per hour (480 mph). The engine had a single-stage supercharger and had a normal rated altitude of 7,000 metres (23,000 ft) and an altitude rating of 9,500 metres (31,200 ft) when it was equipped with nitrous oxide boost. The aircraft carried enough nitrous oxide for 30 minutes of operation.

The bomber variant was designed with a bomb capacity of 500 kilograms (1,100 lb), mounted in a rack under the center wing section. Due to the aircraft's speed and ability to fly at very high altitudes, it was expected to outrun any intercepting fighters and was not equipped with any defensive weapons. The ground attack variant equipped the aircraft with a 5cm cannon and two MG151/20 cannons.

The aircraft was initially proposed in 1942, but did not progress beyond the initial design phase despite being submitted to the Reichsluftfahrtministerium, as it was determined to not offer any significant advantage over existing airframe designs and for lack of need. Because of the engines being mounted in front of the pilot, the cockpit had a poor forward view for cannon and bombing use.
