= Arado SD II =

SD II
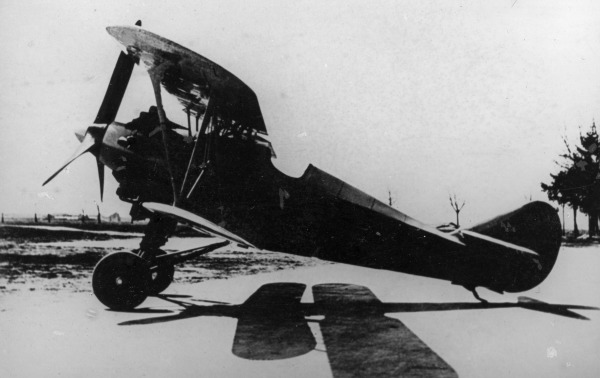

General information
- Type: Fighter
- Manufacturer: Arado Flugzeugwerke
- Designer: Walter Rethel
- Number built: 1

History
- First flight: 1929

The Arado SD II was a fighter biplane developed in Germany in the 1920s. Like the preceding SD I, it was intended to equip the clandestine air force that Germany was assembling at Lipetsk and was hoped to overcome the shortcomings of that type. Although it shared the same basic configuration, the SD II was an all-new design. A considerably larger and heavier aircraft, it had wings of less stagger, braced with conventional wires. The landing gear and tailplane were of far stronger construction.

The SD II was flown competitively against the Heinkel HD 37 in 1929 and was found to have highly undesirable handling characteristics. Development was terminated at that point.

== Specifications ==
General characteristics

- Crew: one, pilot
- Length: 7.40 m (24 ft 4 in)
- Wingspan: 9.90 m (32 ft 6 in)
- Height: 2.95 m (9 ft 8 in)
- Wing area: 23.0 m^{2} (248 sq ft)
- Empty weight: 1,445 kg (3,186 lb)
- Gross weight: 1,770 kg (3,900 lb)
- Powerplant: 1 × Bristol Jupiter VI , 395 kW (530 hp)

Performance

- Maximum speed: 235 km/h (146 mph, 127 kn)
- Service ceiling: 6,400 m (20,997 ft)
- Rate of climb: 11.1 m/s (2,190 ft/min)

Armament

- 2 × fixed, forward-firing 7.92 mm (.312 in) machine guns
