= Arado Ar 199 =

Prototype training floatplane by Arado

Ar 199
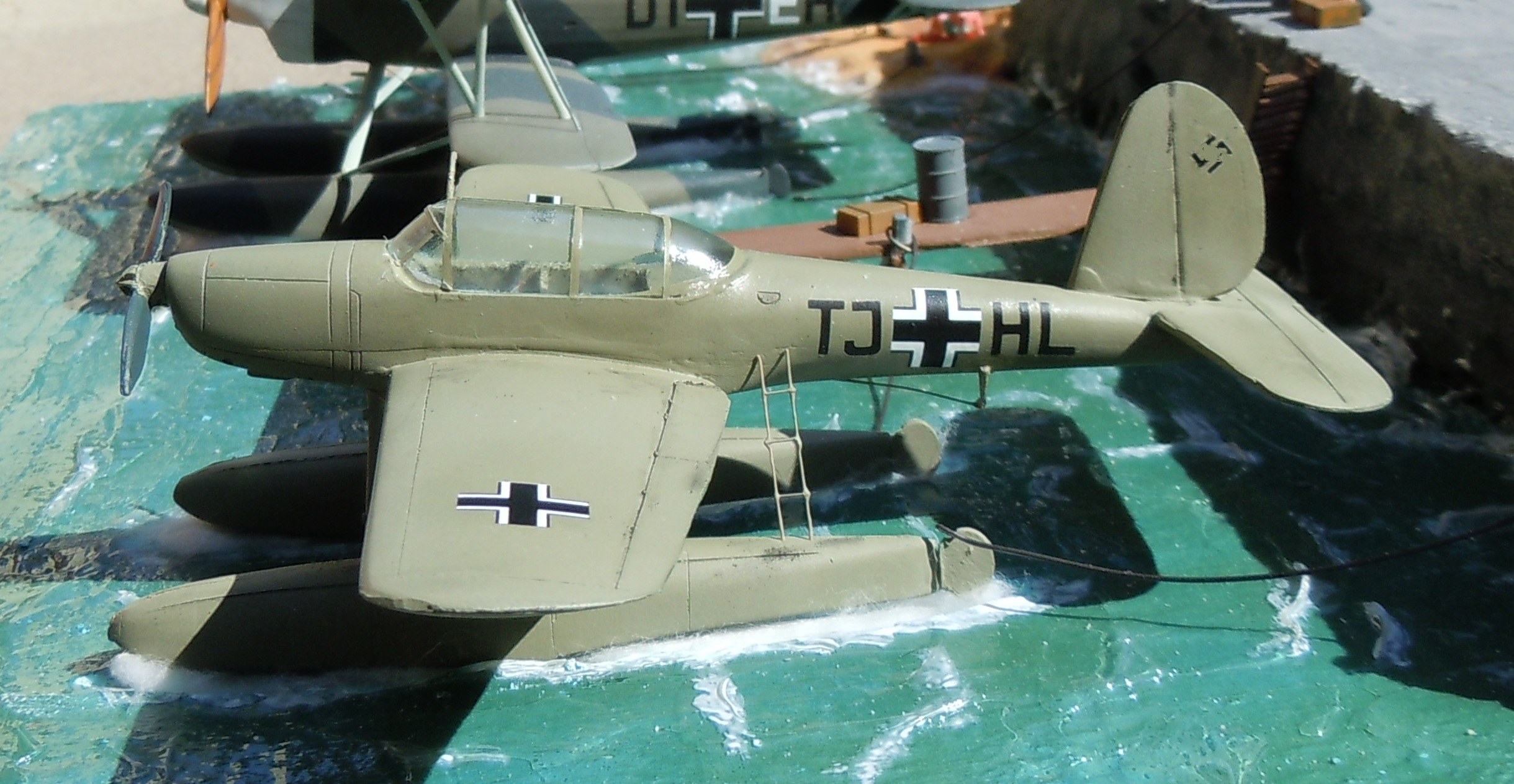
- Model of an Ar 199

General information
- Type: Trainer
- National origin: Germany
- Manufacturer: Arado Flugzeugwerke
- Primary user: Luftwaffe
- Number built: 31

History
- First flight: 1939

The Arado Ar 199 was a floatplane aircraft, built by Arado Flugzeugwerke. It was a low-wing monoplane, designed in 1938 to be launched from a catapult and operated over water. The enclosed cockpit had two side-by-side seats for instructor and student, and a third, rear seat, for a trainee-navigator or radio operator.

Two of the 5 prototypes, D-IFRB and D-ISBC did serve as trainers and were used for air-sea rescue operations from Northern Norway.

== Specifications(Ar 199) ==
Data from Aircraft of the Third Reich Vol.1

General characteristics

- Crew: three
- Length: 10.57 m (34 ft 8 in)
- Wingspan: 12.7 m (41 ft 8 in)
- Height: 4.36 m (14 ft 4 in)
- Wing area: 30.4 m^{2} (327 sq ft)
- Empty weight: 1,675 kg (3,693 lb)
- Max takeoff weight: 2,075 kg (4,575 lb)
- Powerplant: 1 × Argus As 410C inverted V-12 air-cooled piston engine, 340 kW (450 hp)
- Propellers: 2-bladed variable-pitch propeller

Performance

- Maximum speed: 260 km/h (160 mph, 140 kn) at 3,000 m (9,800 ft)
- Cruise speed: 212 km/h (132 mph, 114 kn)
- Range: 740 km (460 mi, 400 nmi)
- Service ceiling: 6,500 m (21,300 ft)
- Rate of climb: 4.5 m/s (890 ft/min)
- Time to altitude: 3,000 m (9,800 ft) in 11 minutes
