= Arado S I =

S I
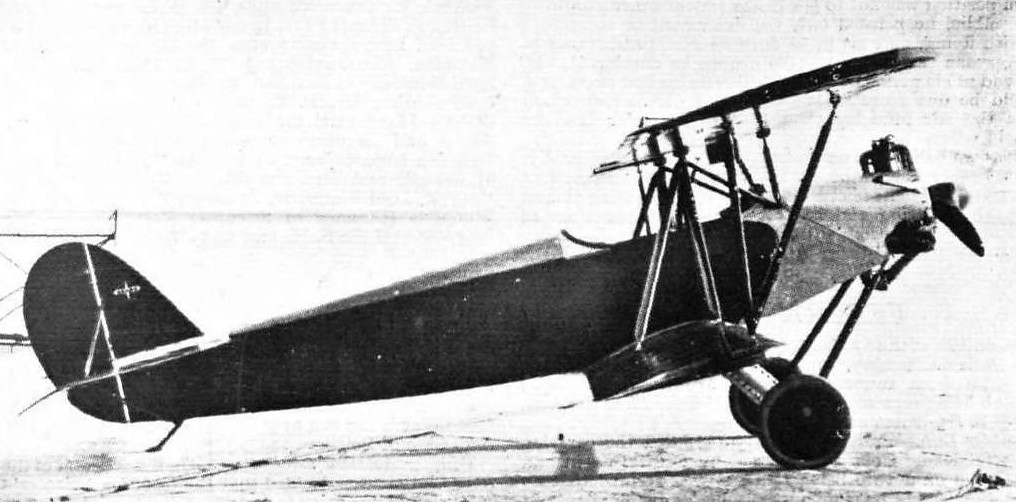
- S I

General information
- Type: Civil trainer
- Manufacturer: Arado Flugzeugwerke
- Number built: 3 + 1 S III

History
- First flight: 1925

The Arado S I was a biplane trainer built in Germany in 1925. The first of three prototypes was powered by a Bristol Lucifer radial engine, while the other two Arado S.Ia aircraft were fitted with the Siemens-Halske Sh 12. The Siemens-Halske Sh 11 powered the Arado S III, a virtually identical aircraft of which only a single prototype was constructed and sold to Turkey.

== Specifications (S III) ==
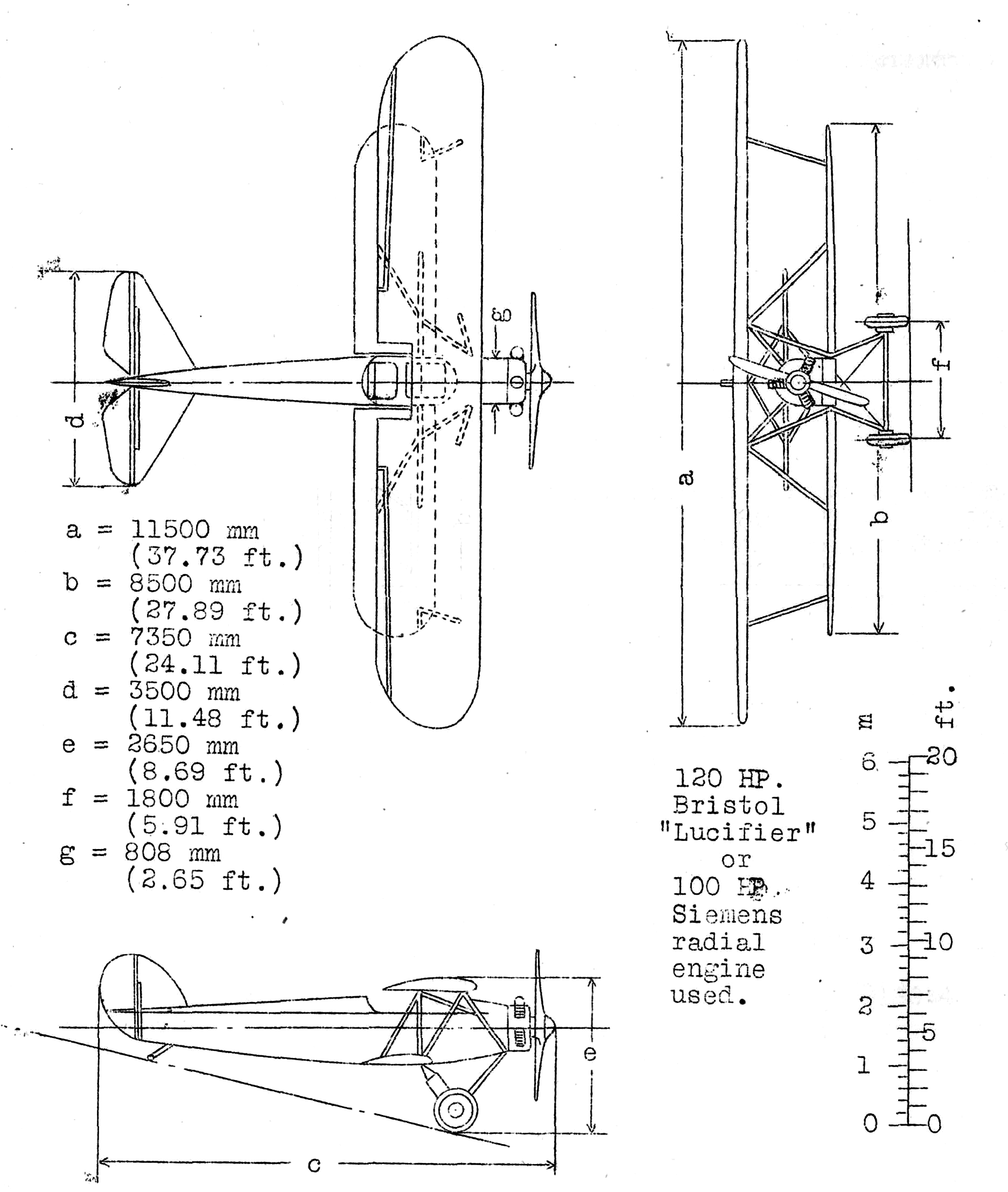
Arado S I 3 view drawing NACA Aircraft Circular No.4

Data from Jane's all the World's Aircraft 1928, German Aviation 1919-1945:Arado S III

General characteristics

- Crew: 2
- Length: 7.5 m (24 ft 7 in)
- Wingspan: 11.5 m (37 ft 9 in)
- Height: 2.75 m (9 ft 0 in)
- Wing area: 27.3 m^{2} (294 sq ft)
- Empty weight: 600 kg (1,323 lb)
- Gross weight: 825 kg (1,819 lb)
- Fuel capacity: 90 L (24 US gal; 20 imp gal)
- Powerplant: 1 × Siemens-Halske Sh.11 7-cylinder air-cooled radial piston engine, 71 kW (95 hp)
- Propellers: 2-bladed fixed pitch propeller

Performance

- Maximum speed: 128 km/h (80 mph, 69 kn)
- Landing speed: 50 km/h (31 mph; 27 kn)
- Range: 500 km (310 mi, 270 nmi)
- Service ceiling: 3,700 m (12,100 ft)
- Rate of climb: 1.66 m/s (327 ft/min)
- Time to altitude: 1,000 m (3,300 ft) in 10 minutes; 2,000 m (6,600 ft) in 22 minutes 30 seconds
- Wing loading: 30 kg/m^{2} (6.1 lb/sq ft)
- Power/mass: 0.0861 kW/kg (0.0524 hp/lb)
