= Arado Ar 64 =

1930 fighter aircraft family

Ar 64
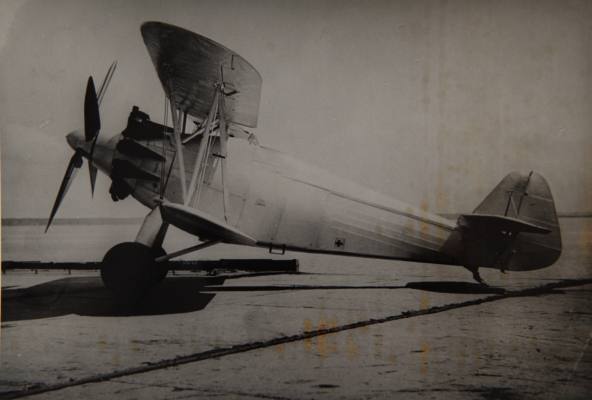

General information
- Type: Biplane fighter
- Manufacturer: Arado
- Primary user: Luftwaffe
- Number built: 24

History
- First flight: Spring 1930

The Arado Ar 64 was a single-seat biplane fighter designed and produced by the German aircraft manufacturer Arado. It was among the first fighters produced when Germany abandoned the restrictions of the Treaty of Versailles and began rearming.

The Ar 64 was developed from the earlier Arado SD II and Arado SD III specifically to equip the so-called 'display squadrons' of the Reichswehr (German armed forces). It was typically powered by a Siemens (Bristol) Jupiter VI air-cooled radial engine, which had a distinctive streamlined deflector shroud around its cylinders to reduce drag. The Ar 64 was the company's first aircraft to be provisioned with hydraulic brakes. The prototype made its maiden flight in the spring of 1930.

While the aircraft exhibited unfavourable take-off and landing characteristics, as well as structural weaknesses that could led to it breaking up, the Ar 64 emerged as the favourite and received a production contract, unlike the competing Heinkel HD 43. Accordingly, Arado was the first Germany aircraft manufacturer to receive a production order for a fighter. In addition to the Reichswehr, the Ar 64 garnered the attention of the Soviet Union, although no export order was forthcoming. The Ar 64 would be further developed into the Ar 65, an improved fighter powered by the BMW VI inline engine and featuring connected ailerons. Both aircraft were built in parallel through to 1936.

== Design and development ==
During the early to mid 1920s, the German aircraft manufacturer Arado had, in conformance with the restrictions on Germany's aviation industry enacted by the Treaty of Versailles, largely focused upon the civil aviation market. However, the company quickly recognised the opportunities available from the Reichswehr (German armed forces), particularly during the 1926–1929 rearmament programme. One initiative of this programme was the development of military prototypes that could, in the event of conflict breaking out, be promptly put into mass production. Furthermore, the Reichswehr was quietly re-establishing a secret air force under the guise of setting up 'display squadrons'. Despite these ambitions, government funding for aviation was limited, and several of the larger German aircraft manufacturers saw little value in producing prototype military aircraft with seemingly little chance of a production order following.

Arado was the first of Germany's aircraft manufacturers to be awarded a production contract. Their design, designated Ar 64, was a derivative of the earlier Arado SD II and Arado SD III, and had been developed to fulfil the Reichswehrministerium's (Reich War Ministry) requirement for a successor to the Fokker D.XIII fighter. Visible external differences from its predecessors included its longer fuselage, enlarged rudder, and slightly smaller fin, which gave the aircraft greater manoeuvrability. It was the first Arado-built aircraft to be outfitted with hydraulic brakes. It was typically powered by a Siemens (Bristol) Jupiter VI air-cooled radial engine, which drove a four-bladed wooden Schwartz propeller. A streamlined deflector shroud around the engine's cylinders reduced drag. It was typically armed with a pair of 7.92 mm (0.312 in) MG 17 machine guns.

The prototype performed its maiden flight in the spring of 1930. While the aircraft was criticised for its unfavourable take-off and landing characteristics, as well as structural weaknesses that could result in the aircraft breaking up, the Ar 64 was considered to be superior to its principal competitor, the Heinkel HD 43. Accordingly, a production order for 20 Ar 64s was placed in the summer of 1932, while the HD 43 did not proceed beyond the prototype stage. This order comprised two different models, the Ar 64D and Ar 64E, which would be the first fighters built in quantity by Germany since the end of the First World War. The two models differed slightly, the Ar 64D having a revised undercarriage and a four-blade propeller while the Ar 64E was equipped with a two-blade propeller attached to a direct-drive version of the Jupiter VI engine.

During the early 1930s, the Ar 64 was subject to international interest; the Soviet Union was reportedly quite interested in the aircraft, however, declining relations between the two nations made any order unrealistic. Production did proceed for the Reichswehr; by 1932, a monthly production target of 27 aircraft was set, although it was never achieved. The final aircraft was delivered on 30 April 1936. A total of 19 Ar 64s were assigned to the Jagdfliegerschule at Schleissheim and the Jagdstaffeln of the Fliegergruppe Doberitz and Fliegergruppe Damm.

The Ar 64 would serve as the basis for the improved Ar 65 fighter; it differed little in terms of its construction, but benefitted from a longer fuselage, the newly-developed BMW VI inline engine, and the connected ailerons. Production of the Ar 64 and Ar 65 proceeded in parallel through to 1936.

== Variants ==
Data from:

Ar 64a
Prototype, powered by a 395 kW (530 hp) Bristol Jupiter VI nine-cylinder radial. First flight in 1930. One built
Ar 64b
Only two built, powered by a 477 kW (640 hp) BMW VI 6.3 12-cylinder V-type water-cooled engine. First flight in 1931. Two built.
Ar 64c
Powered by a 395 kW (530 hp) Jupiter VI radial, but with minor structural changes. One built.
Ar 64D
Production model. Featured redesigned, and enlarged vertical tail surfaces and a revised undercarriage. Powered by a geared Jupiter VI radial. A total of 20 D and E model Ar 64s were built.
Ar 64E
Production model. Similar to the 64d but with a direct-drive version of the Jupiter VI radial. A total of 20 D and E model Ar 64s were built.

== Operators ==
Weimar Republic

- Reichswehr

Nazi Germany

- Luftwaffe

== Specifications (Ar 64D) ==
Data from Aircraft of the Third Reich

General characteristics

- Crew: one
- Length: 8.43 m (27 ft 8 in)
- Wingspan: 9.9 m (32 ft 6 in)
- Empty weight: 1,210 kg (2,668 lb)
- Max takeoff weight: 1,680 kg (3,704 lb)
- Powerplant: 1 × Siemens (Bristol) Jupiter VI nine-cylinder air-cooled radial piston engine, 395 kW (530 hp)
- Propellers: 4-bladed wooden fixed pitch propeller

Performance

- Maximum speed: 250 km/h (160 mph, 130 kn) at 5,000 m (16,404 ft)

Armament

- 2 × 7.92 mm (0.312 in) MG 17 machine guns

== See also ==
Related lists

- List of interwar military aircraft
- List of military aircraft of Germany
