= Arado E.561 =

General information
- Type: Heavy fighter
- National origin: Germany
- Manufacturer: Arado Flugzeugwerke
- Status: Not Produced

The Arado E.561 was a proposed twin-engine heavy fighter designed by Arado Flugzeugwerke in 1937 and 1938.

== Design ==
The E.561 had a streamlined, cigar-shaped fuselage with low-mounted wings. Its two engines were mounted at the wing roots rather than farther out on the wings. This arrangement was intended to reduce drag and improve the aircraft's performance if one engine failed. Two annular radiators were fitted in front of the propellers. The aircraft had retractable landing gear and was designed for a crew of four. The project was not developed beyond the design stage, possibly because of the complexity of the engine arrangement.
