= Deutsche Verkehrsfliegerschule =

Flying school in Germany

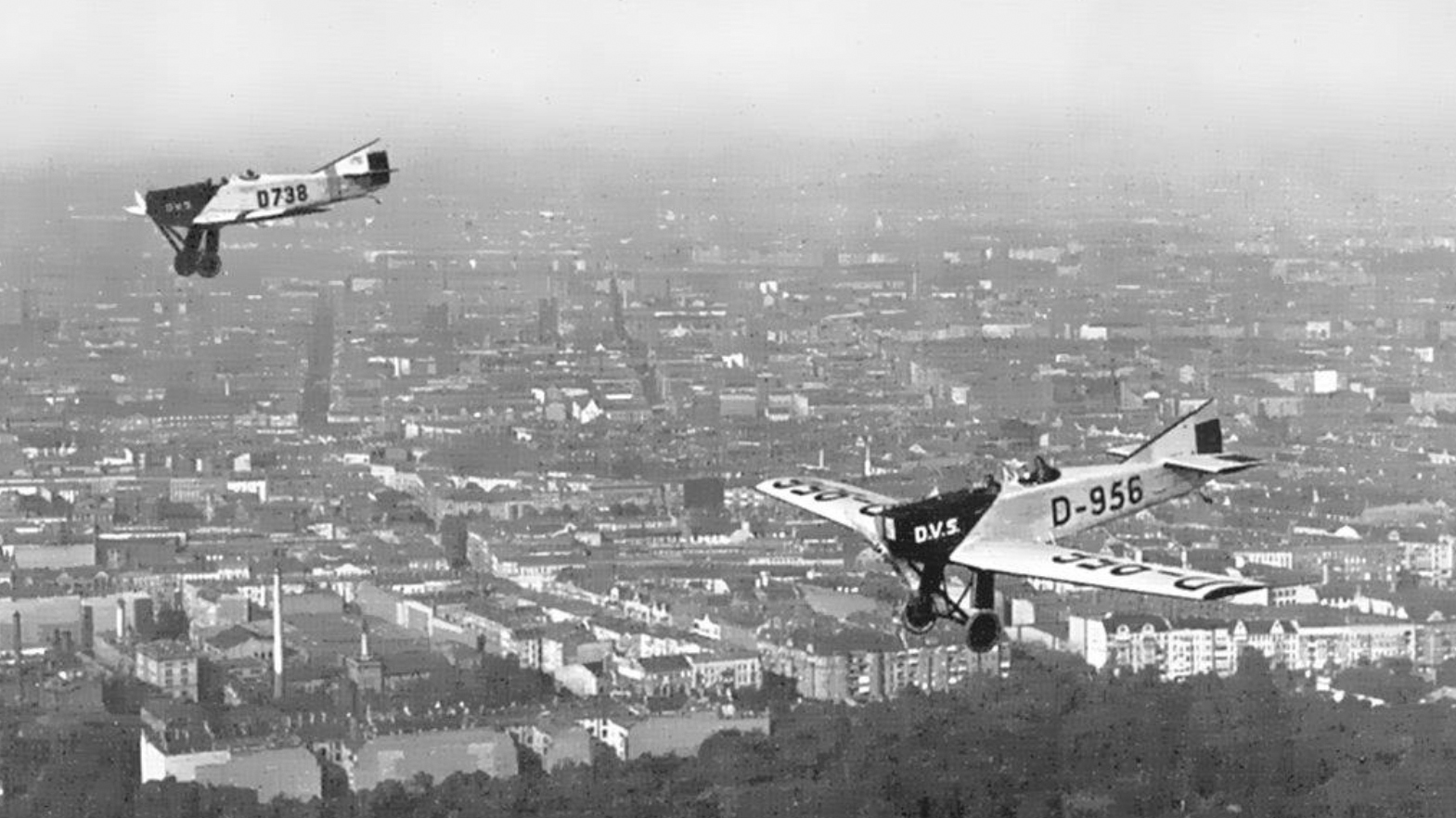
Two Junkers A 20 of the Deutsche Verkehrsfliegerschule (D.V.S.) flying over Berlin in September 1926.

The Deutsche Verkehrsfliegerschule (DVS), German Air Transport School, was a covert military-training organization operating as a flying school in Germany. It began during the Weimar Republic in Staaken, Berlin in 1925 and its head office was transferred in 1929 to Broitzem airfield near Braunschweig.

The DVS was outwardly a flying school for commercial pilots, but in fact became a secret military arm training military aviators for the future Luftwaffe. This training facility grew in importance in the initial stages of Nazi Germany, while camouflaging as a harmless civilian organization (Tarnorganisation), at the time of Germany's rearmament in violation of the Versailles Treaty.

On May 31, 1945, after Nazi Germany's defeat in World War II, the American Military Government issued a special law outlawing the Nazi Party and all of its branches. Known as "Law number five", this Denazification decree disbanded the Deutsche Verkehrsfliegschule and its facilities were taken over by the occupying forces.

Some flying schools in Germany operate under the same name in different locations in the country. All of them were established after the war.

== See also ==
- Deutscher Luftsportverband – 1933-1937
- German re-armament
- National Socialist Flyers Corps – 1937-1945
