= Arado Ar 65 =

1931 fighter aircraft family by Arado

Ar 65
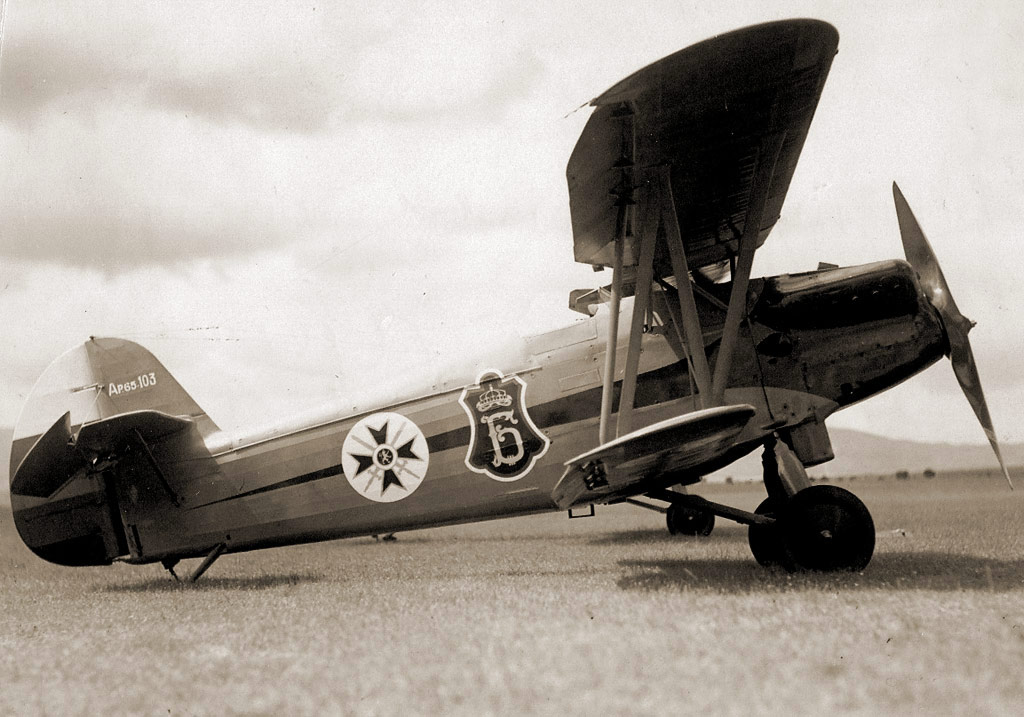

General information
- Type: Biplane fighter
- Manufacturer: Arado
- Primary user: Luftwaffe
- Number built: 85

History
- Manufactured: 1931-1936
- First flight: 1931

The Arado Ar 65 was the single-seat biplane fighter successor to the Ar 64. Both looked very similar. The only major difference was the use of a 12-cylinder inline engine versus the Ar 64's radial. The wingspan was also increased.

The Ar 65 appeared in 1931 and six models were built. The first three 65a-c were prototypes, while the 65d-f were production models. The Ar 65d was delivered in 1933 and served alongside the Ar 64 in the two fighter groups - Fliegergruppe Döberitz and Fliegergruppe Damm. In 1935, the Ar 65 was reduced to a training aircraft. Production of the fighter was discontinued in 1936. However, the next year, 12 of them were presented to Germany's ally - the Royal Bulgarian Air Force. The final production total was 85 aircraft.

== Variants ==
Ar 65a
Prototype, powered by a 559 kW (750 hp) BMW VI 7.3 12-cylinder water-cooled engine. First flight in 1931.
Ar 65b
Prototype, similar to the 65a but with minor structural changes.
Ar 65c
Prototype, similar to the 65b but with minor structural changes.
Ar 65d
Production model.
Ar 65E
Similar to the 65d, but with the removal of the vertical fuselage magazine of six 10 kg (22 lb) bombs.
Ar 65F
Final production model. Similar to the 65E.

== Operators ==
- Bulgaria

Bulgarian Air Force

- Germany

Luftwaffe

== Specifications (Ar 65E) ==
Arado Ar 65

Data from Warplanes of the Third Reich

General characteristics

- Crew: one
- Length: 8.4 m (27 ft 7 in)
- Wingspan: 11.2 m (36 ft 9 in)
- Height: 3.42 m (11 ft 3 in)
- Wing area: 23 m^{2} (250 sq ft)
- Empty weight: 1,510 kg (3,329 lb)
- Gross weight: 1,930 kg (4,255 lb)
- Fuel capacity: 218 L (58 US gal; 48 imp gal)
- Powerplant: 1 × BMW VI 7.3z V-12 liquid-cooled piston engine, 560 kW (750 hp) for take-off, 370 kW (500 hp) continuous maximum power

Performance

- Maximum speed: 300 km/h (190 mph, 160 kn) at 1,650 m (5,410 ft)
- Cruise speed: 246 km/h (153 mph, 133 kn) at 1,400 m (4,600 ft)
- Range: 560 km (350 mi, 300 nmi)
- Service ceiling: 7,600 m (24,935 ft)
- Rate of climb: 10.60 m/s (2,086 ft/min)
- Time to altitude:

1,000 m (3,300 ft) in 1.5 minutes
5,000 m (16,000 ft) in 10.6 minutes

Armament

- Guns: 2 × 7.92 mm (.312 in) MG 17 machine guns with 500 rpg.

== See also ==
Related development

- Arado Ar 64

Aircraft of comparable role, configuration, and era

- Heinkel He 43

Related lists

- List of interwar military aircraft
- List of World War II military aircraft of Germany
- List of military aircraft of Germany

== Bibliography ==
- Green, William, and Gordon Swanborough, The Complete Book of Fighters (Salamander Books, 2002)
- Ledet, Michel (April 1997). "Le Arado Ar 65, première chasseur d'Hitler (deuxième partie et fin)" [Hitler's First Fighter, the Arado Ar 65]. Avions: Toute l'aéronautique et son histoire (in French) (49): 17–21. ISSN 1243-8650.
