= Walter Rethel =

German aircraft designer

Walther Karl Paul Rethel (15 August 1892 – 1977) was a German aircraft designer born in Wesel.

Rethel was born to Prussian Major General Paul Rethel (1855-1933) and Mally Rethel. Rethel's grandfather was the painter Otto Rethel (1822–1892), the brother of Alfred Rethel.

His son was the painter and designer Alfred Rethel (1922–2003) and a granddaughter was the actress Simone Rethel.

Rethel was Chief Designer with German Kondor Flugzeugwerke (1912-1919) beginning in 1916 before working for the Dutch company Fokker in 1919 he joined NAVO Nederlandse Automobiel en-Vliegtuig Onderneming (Dutch Motorcar and Aircraft Co.) hired by Jan van der Eijken, where he developed the RK-P4/220 together with Karl Keidel. He designed aircraft such as the Kondor D series prototype fighters (1, 2 and 6), amphibious Fokker B.I and the Fokker F.VII airliner. In the 1920s he worked for Arado Flugzeugwerke in Germany, before moving to Messerschmitt, where he was chief engineer on the legendary Bf 109.
