= Walter Blume (aircraft designer) =

German fighter ace of World War I and aircraft designer (1896-1964)

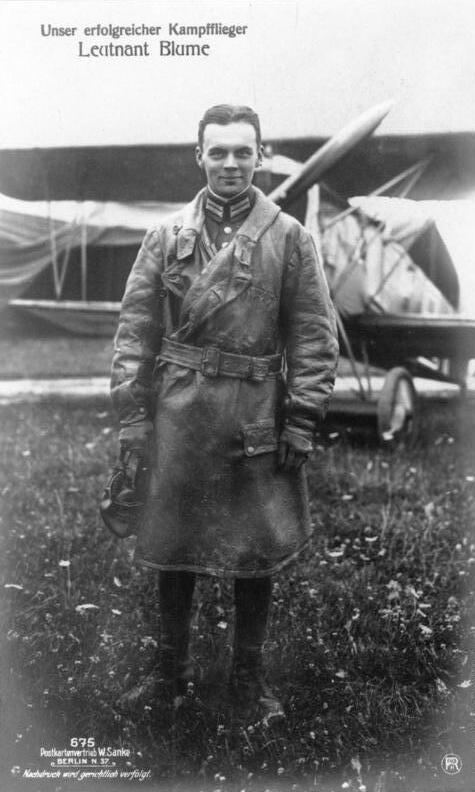
- Lieutenant Walter Blume in World War I
- Born: 10 January 1896; Hirschberg, Silesia, Kingdom of Prussia, German Empire
- Died: 27 May 1964 (aged 68); Duisburg, North Rhine-Westphalia, West Germany
- Military career
- Allegiance: Germany
- Branch: Jaegers, Aerial Service
- Service years: 1914–1919
- Rank: Leutnant
- Units: 5th Jaegers; Feldflieger Abteilung 65; Feldflieger Abteilung 280; Jagdstaffel 26; Jagdstaffel 9
- Awards: Pour le Merite; Royal House Order of Hohenzollern; Iron Cross
- Other work: Aircraft designer. Jet propulsion pioneer.

Walter Blume (10 January 1896 – 27 May 1964) was a German fighter ace of World War I. During World War I, he flew with two fighter squadrons, Jagdstaffel 26 and Jagdstaffel 9 gaining 28 aerial victories and earning the Iron Cross, Royal House Order of Hohenzollern, and the Pour le Merite.

Post World War I he became a prominent aircraft designer for both Albatros and Arado, being one of the pioneers of jet propulsion design in airplanes.

== Early life and World War I service ==
Walter Blume was born in Hirschberg, Silesia, and originally served in the 5th Silesian Jaeger Battalion in September 1914. After being wounded early in the conflict, he trained as a pilot beginning 30 June 1915. He began his flying career in two-seater Aviatik aircraft with Feldflieger Abteilung (Field Flier Detachment) 65 from 18 June 1916 through 20 January 1917. He received an Iron Cross Second Class during this time, on 24 July 1916. He then successfully asked for a transfer to flying single-seat fighters for Jagdstaffel 26 in January 1917. In August 1916, he was promoted to Vizefeldwebel. On 31 January 1917, he was commissioned a leutnant. This was also the month he would shift to Jagdstaffel 26.

He scored his first victory for Jagdstaffel 26 on 10 May 1917. On 14 August, he received the Iron Cross First Class. He became an ace on 24 October 1917, and on 29 November 1917, he received a serious chest wound in combat with No. 48 Squadron RFC's Bristol F.2 Fighters. He was hospitalised for over 3 months.

After a spell with Fliegerersatz-Abteilung (Replacement Detachment) 3, on 5 March 1918, Blume returned to active duty, commanding Jagdstaffel 9. He scored a further 22 victories, all with his new unit. With the exception of double scores on 31 August 1918 and 14 September 1918, he accumulated his successes singly, mostly fighters. Only four of his victories were over two-seater aircraft. He flew in both Albatros fighters and the Fokker D.VII.

Blume was awarded the Knight's Cross of the House Order of Hohenzollern on 7 August 1918. This was followed by his receipt of the German Empire's most prestigious medal, the Pour le Merite on 2 October 1918, the same day as his 27th and penultimate victory.

He resigned from military service on 15 January 1919.

== Post war and World War II ==
After World War I, he remained in aviation. He trained as an aeronautical engineer at the Technical University at Hanover, and subsequently joined the German Arado Flugzeugwerke in the mid-1920s, where he was involved in the design of the Ar 95, Arado Ar 96, and Ar 196. In early 1933 he was appointed Chief Design Engineer of Arado Flugzeugwerke and over the next ten years was responsible for the design of some of the world's first jets, such as the Ar 234 twin-jet reconnaissance aircraft, which he saw through its development in several different prototypes and finally to the twin-jet bomber, the Ar 234 Blitz. Towards the end of World War II he led the Arado design team in upgrading the Ar 234 to a Four-Jet Bomber variant, but one which only reached "Proof of Concept" form. He attempted to revive one of his designs, the Blume Bl.502, for Arado as a light civil aircraft, but met with no commercial success.

After the German surrender he was captured by the Soviet Army and taken to the Soviet Union, where for several years he helped develop their fledgling jet aircraft program.

== Decorations and awards ==
- Iron Cross:
  - 2nd class (24 July 1916)
  - 1st class (14 August 1917)
- Knight's Cross of the Royal House Order of Hohenzollern with swords (1918)
- Pour le Merite (30 September 1918)
