= List of RLM aircraft designations =

This is a list of aircraft type numbers allocated by an institution under the direction of Heereswaffenamt (before May 1933) and the Reich Air Ministry (RLM) between 1933 and 1945 for German military and civilian aircraft and in parallel to the list of German aircraft engines. See RLM aircraft designation system for an explanation of how these numbers were used.

There is no single "master list" applicable all the way from 1933 to 1945 - numbers were occasionally duplicated, reallocated, or re-used. Sources differ on the allocations.

== Listing ==
=== 0-100 ===
GL/C number	Aircraft	Notes
8-01	Not allocated	
8-02	Fieseler Fi 2	Tiger, acrobatic trainer; originally F.2
8-03	Not allocated	
8-04	Not allocated	
8-05	Fieseler Fi 5	sports plane; originally F.5
8-06	DFS 6	target glider (prototype), 1936
8-07	Not allocated	
8-08	Göppingen Gö 8	glider, 1/5 scale model of the Do 214; may be a mistake as scale model aircraft weren't covered in the RLM list
8-09	Göppingen Gö 9	Powered aerodynamic scale model of the Do 335; may be a mistake as scale model aircraft weren't covered in the RLM list
8-10	Dornier Do 10	(Do C4) fighter (prototype), 1931
8-11	Dornier Do 11	(Do F) medium bomber, 1931
	WNF Wn 11	amphibian transport (prototype)
8-12	Dornier Do 12	Libelle III (Dragonfly III), amphibian flying boat, 1932
	Zlín Z-XII (captured aircraft)	sports aircraft
8-13	Dornier Do 13	medium bomber, development of Do 11, 1933 (prototypes)
8-14	Dornier Do 14	research amphibian (prototype)
8-15	Dornier Do 15	designation given to Dornier Do Y bomber numbers 3 and 4 in an attempt to interest RLM in them
	WNF Wn 15	touring plane; originally HV 15
8-16	WNF Wn 16	trainer (prototype)
	Dornier Do 16	flying boat; RLM designation for Do J II Wal
8-17	Dornier Do 17	Fliegender Bleistift (Flying Pencil), medium bomber + reconnaissance + night-fighter
8-18	Dornier Do 18	long-range flying boat, development of Do 16
8-19	Dornier Do 19	four-engine heavy bomber (2 prototypes only); Ural bomber candidate
8-20	Dornier Do 20	eight-engine flying boat (project)
8-21	Not allocated	
8-22	Dornier Do 22	torpedo bomber + reconnaissance land & sea
8-23	Dornier Do 23	medium bomber (development of (Do 13/11)
8-24	Dornier Do 24	intended as reconnaissance flying-boat, used for search and rescue
8-25	Dornier Do 25	Allocated to Dornier, not used; number used postwar
	Klemm Kl 25	sportsplane, development of Klemm Kl 20; originally L 25
8-26	Dornier Do 26	transport + reconnaissance flying boat
	Klemm Kl 26	sportsplane, development of L 25
8-27	Dornier Do 27	Allocated to Dornier, not used; number used postwar
	Messerschmitt M 27	two-seat sport and training aircraft; may be a mistake; 8-27 may have been actually assigned to Klemm
8-28	Not allocated	
8-29	Akaflieg Darmstadt D-29	experimental cabin monoplane; may be a mistake as it conflicts with the Do 29 and Akaflieg aircraft weren't normally covered in the RLM list
	Dornier Do 29	heavy fighter + bomber (project), Bf 110 competitor; number reused postwar
8-30	Focke-Wulf Fw 30	Heuschrecke (Grasshopper), autogyro; Cierva C.30 built under license
8-31	Klemm Kl 31	single-engine transport, 1931
8-32	Klemm Kl 32	single-engine transport, Kl 32 derivative, 1931
8-33	Junkers Ju 33	(Junkers W 33), single-engine transport, 1926; Ju prefix not commonly used
	Klemm Kl 33	(Klemm L 33), single-seat ultra-light sports plane (prototype)
8-34	Junkers Ju 34	(Junkers W 34), single-engine light transport + training (development of Ju 33), 1934; Ju prefix not commonly used
8-35	Klemm Kl 35	sportplane + trainer, 1935
8-36	Klemm Kl 36	single-engine transport, 1934
8-37	Heinkel He 37	Allocated to Heinkel, not used
8-38	Heinkel He 38	fighter land & sea; originally HD 38
	Junkers Ju 38	(Junkers G.38), large four-engine passenger and cargo transport; Ju prefix not commonly used
8-39	DFS 39	tail-less research aircraft
8-40	DFS 40	tail-less research aircraft; number later allocated to Blohm & Voss
	Blohm & Voss BV 40	glider interceptor (prototypes)
	Focke-Wulf Fw 40	short-range observation aircraft (prototype); originally A 40
8-41	Heinkel He 41	Allocated to Heinkel, not used
8-42	Focke-Wulf Fw 42	twin-engine medium bomber, canard layout (project)
	Heinkel He 42	seaplane trainer; originally HD 42
8-43	Focke-Wulf Fw 43	Falke ("Falcon"), light utility aircraft (prototype); originally A 43
8-44	Focke-Wulf Fw 44	Stieglitz ("Goldfinch"), trainer (biplane)
8-45	Heinkel He 45	biplane light bomber
8-46	Heinkel He 46	reconnaissance (W 34 derivative); originally HD 46
	Junkers Ju 46	Single-engine high-speed mail landplane/floatplane; W 34 derivate
8-47	Focke-Wulf Fw 47	Höhengeier (Vulture), weather plane; originally A 47
	Heinkel He 47	trainer (project); mockup burned in factory fire in 1934; project cancelled afterwards
	Junkers K 47	single-engine two-seat fighter (1928); for export only
8-48	Junkers Ju 48	(Junkers A 48), two-seat fighter-trainer, civil version of K 47; Ju prefix not commonly used
	Heinkel He 48	short-range reconnaissance aircraft (project); mockup inspected in 1935 but cancelled in 1936 before its first flight
8-49	Junkers Ju 49	high altitude research plane/record aircraft (prototype)
	Heinkel He 49	biplane fighter
8-50	Heinkel He 50	biplane dive bomber
	Junkers A50	Junior, sports plane
8-51	Heinkel He 51	biplane fighter-bomber; He 49 derivative
	Junkers K 51	Four-engine heavy bomber; derivative of G.38; license-built in Japan as Mitsubishi Ki-20
8-52	Heinkel He 52	high-altitude development of He 51 (prototype)
	Junkers Ju 52	transport + bomber gained nickname Tante Ju ("Auntie Ju"),
8-53		Junkers K 53; reconnaissance aircraft, only built in Sweden; may be a mistake as license-built aircraft weren't normally covered on the RLM list
8-54	DFS 54	experimental high-altitude glider; cancelled in 1941
	Nagler-Rolz NR 54	collapsible and portable ultra-light helicopter
8-55	Nagler-Rolz NR 55	single-seat miniature helicopter (prototype)
	Focke-Wulf Fw 55	two-seat sportplane/trainer; slightly modified Al 102
8-56	Focke-Wulf Fw 56	Stösser ("Falcon Hawk"), trainer (parasol monoplane)
	Heinkel He 56	observation biplane; license-built in Japan as Aichi E3A
8-57	Focke-Wulf Fw 57	heavy fighter + bomber (prototype)
	North American NA-57 (captured aircraft)	trainer; captured from the French Air Force
8-58	Focke-Wulf Fw 58	Weihe ("Harrier"), transport + trainer
	Heinkel He 58	mail seaplane (prototype)
8-59	Heinkel He 59	reconnaissance (biplane seaplane)
8-60	Heinkel He 60	ship-borne reconnaissance (biplane seaplane); originally HD 60
	Junkers Ju 60	Pfeil, single-engine high speed airliner/mailplane (prototype)
8-61	Focke-Achgelis Fa 61	helicopter (2 prototypes), also known as Fw 61
	Heinkel He 61	export version of He 45 for China
8-62	Focke-Wulf Fw 62	ship-borne reconnaissance (biplane seaplane)
	Heinkel He 62	observation float biplane, derivate of He 56; license-built in Japan as Aichi AB-5
8-63	Potez 63 (captured aircraft)	multirole aircraft
	Heinkel He 63	biplane trainer (prototypes)
8-64	Heinkel He 64	sports plane (prototypes)
	Arado Ar 64	fighter (biplane)
8-65	Arado Ar 65	fighter/trainer, glider towing (biplane - re-engined Ar 64)
	Heinkel He 65	single-engine high speed mailplane (project), 1932
8-66	Arado Ar 66	trainer + night intruder
	Heinkel He 66	dive bomber, derivative of He 50 for Japan
8-67	Arado Ar 67	biplane fighter prototype
8-68	Arado Ar 68	fighter (biplane)
8-69	Arado Ar 69	biplane trainer prototypes, 1933
8-70	Heinkel He 70	Blitz (Lightning), single-engine transport + mailplane, 1932
8-71	Heinkel He 71	sports plane
	Avia B-71 (captured aircraft)	fast bomber
8-72	Heinkel He 72	Kadett (Cadet), trainer
8-73	Heinkel He 73	Allocated to Heinkel, possibly not used
8-74	Heinkel He 74	fighter + advanced trainer (prototypes), 1933
8-75	Albatros Al 75	Ass (Ace), trainer; originally L 75
8-76	Arado Ar 76	fighter trainer
8-77	Arado Ar 77	trainer (prototypes)
8-78	Arado Ar 78	Allocated to Arado, possibly not used
8-79	Arado Ar 79	two-seat sportsplane/trainer
8-80	Arado Ar 80	single-seat fighter (prototype), 1934
8-81	Arado Ar 81	two-seat dive-bomber (prototypes), 1936
8-82		Savoia-Marchetti SM.82, heavy bomber/transport
8-83	Not allocated	
8-84	Albatros Al 84	two-seat biplane fighter (prototype), 1931; originally L 84; designation may have been later reserved for Junkers, but was not used
8-85	Junkers Ju 85	version of Ju 88 with twin tail
8-86	Junkers Ju 86	twin-engine airliner/transport/bomber/reconnaissance aircraft
8-87	Junkers Ju 87	Stuka, dive-bomber
8-88	Junkers Ju 88	twin-engine high-speed bomber/multirole aircraft
8-89	Junkers Ju 89	four-engine heavy bomber (2 prototypes), 1936; Ural bomber candidate
8-90	Junkers Ju 90	four-engine transport/airliner
8-91	Junkers Ju 91	Allocated to Junkers; possibly not used
8-92	Junkers Ju 92	four-engine bomber/troop transport (project); possible confusion with other Junkers aircraft or project
8-93	Junkers Ju 93	Allocated to Junkers; possibly not used
8-94	Junkers Ju 94	Allocated to Junkers; possibly not used
8-95	Arado Ar 95	biplane coastal patrol + attack (land & sea)
8-96	Arado Ar 96	trainer
8-97	Fieseler Fi 97	touring plane
8-98	Fieseler Fi 98	dive-bomber (2 prototypes)
8-99	Fieseler Fi 99	Jungtiger (Young Tiger) sportsplane + touring plane (1 prototype)
8-100	Heinkel He 100	fighter; number originally allocated to Fieseler, but requested by Heinkel as a "special" number for his aircraft

=== 101-200 ===
GL/C number	Aircraft	Notes
8-101	Albatros Al 101	two-seat sportsplane + trainer, 1930; originally L 101
8-102	Albatros Al 102	two-seat sportsplane + trainer, 1931; originally L 102
8-103	Albatros Al 103	experimental, 1932; originally L 103; last Albatros design
	Fieseler Fi 103	also known as FZG 76 (fictitious designation for deception purposes) and V-1 (propaganda designation); manned versions tested as Fi 103R
8-104	Siebel Fh 104	Hallore, medium transport; originally Kl 104 as it was a Klemm design
8-105	Klemm Kl 105	touring plane (prototypes)
8-106	Klemm Kl 106	sportsplane (prototypes), development of Kl 35
8-107	Klemm Kl 107	touring plane
8-108	BFW (Messerschmitt) Bf 108	Taifun (Typhoon), trainer + transport
8-109	BFW (Messerschmitt) Bf 109	fighter
8-110	BFW (Messerschmitt) Bf 110	Key Zerstörer heavy fighter + night-fighter
8-111	Heinkel He 111	bomber
8-112	Heinkel He 112	fighter
8-113	Heinkel He 113	Fictitious designation of He 100D-1 for disinformation purposes
8-114	Heinkel He 114	reconnaissance seaplane
8-115	Heinkel He 115	general-purpose seaplane, torpedo-bomber
8-116	Heinkel He 116	long range mail, transport + reconnaissance
8-117	Henschel Hs 117	Schmetterling (Butterfly), surface-to-air missile (rocket-engined); number was originally allocated to Heinkel, but was not used
8-118	Heinkel He 118	dive bomber (prototypes)
8-119	Heinkel He 119	single propeller-twin engine high-speed bomber (prototypes) 1937; also known as He 111U (propaganda designation)
8-120	Heinkel He 120	four-engine long-range passenger flying-boat (project), 1938
8-121	Henschel Hs 121	fighter + trainer (prototype)
8-122	Henschel Hs 122	reconnaissance aircraft
8-123	Henschel Hs 123	light dive-bomber, ground-attack (biplane)
8-124	Henschel Hs 124	heavy fighter + bomber (prototype)
8-125	Henschel Hs 125	fighter + trainer (prototype)
8-126	Henschel Hs 126	reconnaissance
8-127	Henschel Hs 127	high-speed bomber (prototype)
8-128	Henschel Hs 128	high altitude research aircraft
8-129	Henschel Hs 129	Fliegender Büchsenöffner (Flying Can Opener), ground-attack
8-130	Henschel Hs 130	high altitude reconnaissance + bomber, Bomber B competitor (prototypes)
8-131	Bücker Bü 131	Jungmann (Young Man), trainer (biplane)
8-132	Henschel Hs 132	dive bomber (jet-engined) (prototype); number originally allocated to Bücker, but was not used
8-133	Bücker Bü 133	Jungmeister (Young Champion), trainer + competition aerobatics (biplane)
8-134	Bücker Bü 134	touring plane (prototype)
8-135	Blohm & Voss Ha 135	biplane trainer (6 built)
8-136	Blohm & Voss Ha 136	trainer (prototype)
	Hütter Hü 136	dive-bomber (project)
8-137	Blohm & Voss Ha 137	light dive-bomber (prototypes)
8-138	Blohm & Voss BV 138	Seedrache (Sea Dragon)/Fliegender Holzschuh (Flying Clog), reconnaissance/patrol flying boat (first two designated as Ha 138)
8-139	Blohm & Voss Ha 139	long-range floatplane
8-140	Blohm & Voss Ha 140	torpedo bomber floatplane (prototypes)
8-141	Blohm & Voss BV 141	reconnaissance (asymmetric)
8-142	Blohm & Voss Ha 142	maritime patrol/transport
8-143	Blohm & Voss BV 143	glide bomb (prototype)
8-144	Blohm & Voss BV 144	twin-engine airliner (prototype)
8-145	Gotha Go 145	trainer
8-146	Gotha Go 146	small transport (twin-engine), 1935
8-147	Gotha Go 147	STOL tail-less reconnaissance (prototypes)
	Junkers Ju 147	experimental twin-engine, high-altitude bomber (project); allocation not confirmed
8-148	Gotha Go 148	Allocated to Gotha; not used for superstitious reasons (1+4+8 = 13)
8-149	Gotha Go 149	trainer (prototypes)
8-150	Gotha Go 150	two engine touring aircraft
8-151	Klemm Kl 151	touring plane (prototype)
8-152	Klemm Kl 152	fighter (project); number transferred to Focke-Wulf
	Focke-Wulf Ta 152	fighter (derived from Fw 190)
8-153	Focke-Wulf Ta 153	fighter (derived from Fw 190, prototype), developed as Ta 152H; number originally allocated to Klemm, but was not used
8-154	Focke-Wulf Ta 154	Moskito (Mosquito), wood-framed night-fighter; number originally allocated to Klemm, but was not used
8-155	Blohm & Voss BV 155	high-altitude interceptor (formerly Me 155); number originally assigned to Klemm, but was not used
8-156	Fieseler Fi 156	Storch (Stork), STOL reconnaissance, ambulance
8-157	Fieseler Fi 157	unmanned target(prototypes)
8-158	Fieseler Fi 158	research aircraft
8-159	Focke-Wulf Fw 159	fighter (prototype only)
8-160	Junkers Ju 160	passenger plane
8-161	BFW (Messerschmitt) Bf 161	reconnaissance aircraft, development of Bf 110 (prototypes)
8-162	BFW (Messerschmitt) Bf 162	Jaguar, fast bomber, development of Bf 110 (prototype)
	Heinkel He 162	Spatz (sparrow, Heinkel's name for the design) - Jet-powered fighter, winner of the Volksjäger (People's Fighter) design competition; originally designated as He 500, reallocated to 8-162 as a security measure
8-163	BFW (Messerschmitt) Bf 163	STOL reconnaissance aircraft (one prototype)
	Messerschmitt Me 163	Komet (Comet), interceptor (rocket-engined); initially known as Me 194 as it continued development of the DFS 194; reallocated to 8-163 as a security measure; one development step was known as Li 163
8-164	Messerschmitt Bf 164	experimental aircraft (project); design for a world flight planned by the RLM, projected 1935-1937
	Messerschmitt Me 164	airliner (prototype); transferred to Caudron after the occupation of France
8-165	BFW (Messerschmitt) Bf 165	4-engine heavy bomber (mock-up only)
8-166	Kiel FK 166	trainer (prototype); number transferred to Fieseler
	Fieseler Fi 166	jet fighter (project)
8-167	Fieseler Fi 167	ship-borne torpedo bomber + reconnaissance (biplane)
8-168	Fieseler Fi 168	ground-attack aircraft (abandoned)
8-169	Fieseler Fi 169	Allocated to Fieseler; possibly not used
8-170	Heinkel He 170	reconnaissance aircraft; export version of He 70 for Hungary with Gnome-Rhône 14K engine; internally known as "He 70 Hungary"
8-171	Heinkel He 171	Allocated to Heinkel; possibly not used
8-172	Heinkel He 172	Kadett (Cadet), trainer, derivative of He 72 (prototype)
8-173	Heinkel He 173	Allocated to Heinkel; possibly not used
8-174	Heinkel He 174	Allocated to Heinkel; possibly not used
8-175	Bloch MB.175 (captured aircraft)	reconnaissance bomber
8-176	Heinkel He 176	Pioneering rocket-engined experimental aircraft (prototype)
8-177	Heinkel He 177	Greif (Griffon), Germany's only operational long-range heavy bomber
8-178	Heinkel He 178	Pioneering jet-engined experimental aircraft
8-179	Heinkel He 179	Four-engine variant of the He 177; If the source is correct at all, then at most was a work assignment from mid-1939 till September. Never officially assigned by RLM (project)
8-180	Bücker Bü 180	Student, sportsplane + trainer
8-181	Bücker Bü 181	Bestmann (Best man), trainer + ground attack
8-182	Bücker Bü 182	Kornett (Cornet), trainer (three prototypes)
8-183	Focke-Wulf Ta 183	Huckebein, jet-engined fighter (project); number originally allocated to Bücker, but was not used; initially designated as Fw 232 but changed to Ta 183 to avoid confusion with the Ar 232
8-184	Flettner Fl 184	experimental helicopter (prototype)
8-185	Flettner Fl 185	experimental helicopter (prototype); development of Fl 184
8-186	Focke-Wulf Fw 186	reconnaissance autogiro (prototype); number later transferred to Junkers
	Junkers Ju 186	high-altitude research aircraft derived from Ju 86
8-187	Focke-Wulf Fw 187	Falke (Falcon), heavy fighter
	Junkers Ju 187	single-engine attack aircraft developed from the Ju 87 (project); number assigned in-house by Junkers, not by the RLM
8-188	Junkers Ju 188	Rächer (Avenger), bomber, reconnaissance; number originally allocated to Focke-Wulf, but transferred to Junkers at their request
8-189	Focke-Wulf Fw 189	Fliegende Auge ("flying eye")/Eule (Owl)/Uhu (Eagle-owl), reconnaissance
8-190	Focke-Wulf Fw 190	Würger (Shrike/Butcher-Bird), fighter
8-191	Focke-Wulf Fw 191	Bomber B competitor, medium bomber (prototypes)
8-192	AGO Ao 192	Kurier (Courier), light transport
8-193	DFS 193	tail-less research aircraft (project); number possibly originally allocated to AGO, but was not used
8-194	DFS 194	rocket-powered research aircraft, forerunner of Me 163
8-195	Arado Ar 195	ship-borne torpedo bomber + reconnaissance, derivative of Ar 95
	Focke-Wulf Fw 195	large transport aircraft (project); in-house designation derived from drawing No. 195
8-196	Arado Ar 196	ship-borne reconnaissance + coastal patrol (seaplane)
8-197	Arado Ar 197	naval fighter (biplane - derived from Ar 68)
8-198	Arado Ar 198	Fliegende Aquarium (flying aquarium) reconnaissance, (prototypes)
	Focke-Wulf Fw 198	Invented by the British press in 1940-1942; pictures of the Die Schelde S-21 presented as evidence; repeatedly erroneously referenced
8-199	Arado Ar 199	seaplane trainer
	Fieseler-Skoda FiSk 199	variant of Bf 109G with a high-legged, jettisonable tail wheel to allow the hanging of an SC-500 bomb
8-200	Focke-Wulf Fw 200	Condor, transport + maritime patrol-bomber; number assigned out of sequence at Focke-Wulf's request
	Dornier Do 200	Cover designation for captured Boeing B-17 Flying Fortresses; number probably derived from the designation of the unit operating it, KG 200

=== 201-300 ===
GL/C number	Aircraft	Notes
8-201	Siebel Si 201	STOL reconnaissance aircraft (prototype)
8-202	Siebel Si 202	Hummel (Bumblebee), sports plane + trainer, 1938
8-203	DFS 203	assault glider, two DFS 230 fuselages (project); number possibly originally allocated to Siebel, but was not used
8-204	Siebel Si 204	transport + aircrew trainer; development of Fh 104
8-205	Not allocated	
8-206	Focke-Wulf Fw 206	passenger plane (project); designed for DLH as successor to Ju 52/3m
8-207	Not allocated	
8-208	Messerschmitt Me 208	touring aircraft, development of Bf 108 (prototypes); development handed over to SNCAN in 1941; entered production postwar as the Nord 1100
8-209	Messerschmitt Me 209	speed-record aircraft (prototype), four built; redesignated to Me 109R for propaganda purposes after breaking the air-speed record in 1939
	Messerschmitt Me 209	fighter (1943 prototype - completely different from above), began with "V5" prototype
8-210	Messerschmitt Me 210	heavy fighter + reconnaissance
8-211	Hütter Hü 211	reconnaissance aircraft, derived from He 219 (project)
	Focke-Wulf Ta 211	twin-engine fast attack bomber, developed into the Ta 154; in-house designation by Focke-Wulf, named after the engine planned to power it
8-212	Dornier Do 212	research amphibian (prototype)
	Zlín 212 (captured aircraft)	primary trainer
8-213		Not allocated; possibly reserved for Dornier
8-214	Dornier Do 214	transport flying boat (abandoned)
8-215	Dornier Do 215	bomber + reconnaissance + night-fighter, export version of Do 17 Z with DB 601 engine
8-216	Dornier Do 216	six-engine transport flying boat (project); smaller military variant of the Do 214
8-217	Dornier Do 217	medium bomber + night-fighter
8-218	Dornier Do 218	Allocated to Dornier, possibly not used
8-219	Heinkel He 219	Uhu (Eagle-Owl)
8-220	Heinkel He 220	four-engine very large passenger flying boat (project); competing design to BV 222 for DLH
8-221	Dornier Do 221	Allocated to Dornier, possibly not used
8-222	Blohm & Voss BV 222	Wiking (Viking); transport flying boat
8-223	Focke-Achgelis Fa 223	Drache (Dragon); transport helicopter (prototype)
8-224	Focke-Achgelis Fa 224	Libelle (Dragonfly), helicopter, development of Fa 61 (project); construction stopped in 1940 due to WWII
8-225	AGO Ao 225	heavy fighter (project); number reassigned to Focke-Achgelis
	Focke-Achgelis Fa 225	autogyro assault glider conversion of DFS 230 (prototype)
8-226	Blohm & Voss BV 226	renumbered as BV 246; 8-226 reassigned to Horten
	Horten Ho 226	flying wing research aircraft (prototype), also called H.VII
	Focke-Wulf Fw 226	Flitzer, single-engine jet fighter (project); likely an in-house designation
8-227	FGP 227	small scale development aircraft for BV 238
8-228	DFS 228	Narwhal, rocket-powered reconnaissance aircraft (prototype only)
8-229	Horten Ho 229	fighter jet-propelled (flying-wing); also called H.IX and later Go 229
8-230	DFS 230	transport and assault glider
	Morane-Saulnier MS.230 (captured aircraft)	basic trainer
8-231	Arado Ar 231	fold-wing U-boat reconnaissance aircraft (prototype)
8-232	Arado Ar 232	Tausendfüßler (Millipede)/Tatzelwurm, heavy cargo transport
8-233	Arado Ar 233	seaplane (concept), 1940; renamed Ar 430
8-234	Arado Ar 234	Blitz (Lightning), bomber + reconnaissance (jet-engined)
8-235	Dornier Do 235	four-engine heavy bomber (project); allocation not confirmed
8-236	Focke-Achgelis Fa 236	Allocated to Focke-Achgelis, possibly not used
8-237	Blohm & Voss BV 237	asymmetric ground attack aircraft (project)
8-238	Blohm & Voss BV 238	six-engine very long range transport flying-boat (prototype). Largest aircraft built by any Axis nation
	Focke-Wulf Fw 238	four-engine long-range heavy bomber (project, 1941), in-house designation derived from drawing No. 238
8-239	Arado Ar 239	high-altitude bomber (project); allocation not confirmed
	Focke-Wulf Fw 239	twin-jet bomber (project, 1944); also known as "1000x1000x1000 Bomber, Project A"; likely an in-house designation
8-240	Arado Ar 240	heavy fighter + reconnaissance
8-241	Gotha Go 241	touring plane (project)
8-242	Gotha Go 242	transport glider
8-243	Messerschmitt Me 243	Allocated to Messerschmitt, possibly not used
8-244	Gotha Go 244	transport aircraft (powered Go 242)
8-245	Gotha Go 245	Allocated to Gotha, possibly not used
8-246	Blohm & Voss BV 246	Hagelkorn (Hailstone), glide bomb; originally BV 226
8-247	Not allocated	
8-248	Junkers Ju 248	temporary designation of the Me 263 after design was handed over to Junkers
8-249	Focke-Wulf Fw 249	eight-engine heavy transport aircraft (project, 1941), also known as Focke-Wulf P.195; RLM designation is probably a mistake
8-250	Blohm & Voss BV 250	land-based version of BV 238 (project); 8-250 transferred to Focke-Wulf
	Focke-Wulf Fw 250	twin-jet fighter-bomber (project); likely an in-house designation
	Horten Ho 250	flying wing sailplane (prototype), also known as H.III; allocation is questionable
8-251	Focke-Wulf Fw 251	three-seat all-weather night jet fighter (project); likely an in-house designation
	Horten Ho 251	flying wing glider (prototypes), also known as H.IV; allocation is questionable
8-252	Junkers Ju 252	transport, 15 built; 8-252 transferred to Focke-Wulf
	Focke-Wulf Fw 252	single-engine, single-seat jet fighter (project); likely an in-house designation
	Horten Ho 252	flying wing research aircraft (prototype), also known as H.V; allocation is questionable
8-253	Fieseler Fi 253	Spatz (Sparrow), sportsplane (prototypes)
	Horten Ho 253	flying wing glider (prototypes), also known as H.VI; allocation is questionable
8-254	Focke-Wulf Ta 254	twin-engine multipurpose combat aircraft, derivate of Ta 154C (project)
	Horten Ho 254	flying wing research aircraft (prototype), also known as H VII; renamed to Ho 226
8-255	Not allocated	
8-256	Fieseler Fi 256	enlarged development of Fi 156 (prototype)
8-257	Skoda-Kauba SK 257	advanced fighter-trainer (prototypes)
8-258	Not allocated	
8-259	Focke-Wulf Fw 259	Frontjäger, fighter (project)
8-260	Not allocated	
8-261	Messerschmitt Me 261	long-range courier (prototype only)
	Focke-Wulf Fw 261	four-engine bomber/maritime patrol aircraft (project), also known as Focke-Wulf-Projekt 0310225; in-house designation derived from drawing No. 261
8-262	Messerschmitt Me 262	Schwalbe (Swallow), fighter, Sturmvogel (Stormbird), attack (jet-engined)
8-263	Messerschmitt Me 263	interceptor (rocket-engined), (early development as Junkers Ju 248)
8-264	Messerschmitt Me 264	Amerikabomber design competitor, long-range bomber (three prototypes built/flown)
8-265	Flettner Fl 265	Pioneering, first-ever synchropter helicopter, for reconnaissance use
	Messerschmitt Me 265	tail-less heavy fighter (project), based on Lippisch P.10 design; 1942-1943 projected alternative to the Me 210
8-266	Focke-Achgelis Fa 266	Hornisse (Hornet), helicopter (prototype); civil version of the Fa 223
8-267	Focke-Achgelis Fa 267	medevac helicopter (project); medevac version of the Fa 223
	Gotha Go 267	allocated to Gotha, possibly not used
	Horten Ho 267	twin-turbojet flying wing, allocation not confirmed; possibly identical and/or related to Ho/Go 229 and/or Go 267
8-268	Junkers Ju 268	unmanned flying bomb (project), intended for use with He 162
8-269	Focke-Achgelis Fa 269	convertiplane (project)
8-270	Heinkel He 270	version of He 70 with DB 601 engine
8-271	Weserflug We 271	amphibian transport (prototype)
8-272	Focke-Wulf Fw 272	mixed-power multipurpose fighter; in-house designation derived from drawing No. 272; number originally allocated to Heinkel, but not used
8-273	Heinkel He 273	Allocated to Heinkel, possibly not used
8-274	Heinkel He 274	high-altitude heavy bomber, originally the "He 177H" design in October 1941 (prototype, 2 completed by French post-war); transferred to Farman
8-275	Heinkel He 275	four-engine heavy bomber (project, 1945); may not have been a bomber
8-276	Heinkel He 276	Allocated to Heinkel, possibly not used
8-277	Heinkel He 277	Amerikabomber design competitor, derivative of He 177 (with He 219-inspired fuselage/tail) with RLM number assigned to it by February 1943, a paper design only (never built)
8-278	Heinkel He 278	turboprop fighter (project); allocation not confirmed
8-279	Heinkel He 279	Allocated to Heinkel, not used
8-280	Heinkel He 280	turbojet fighter, first jet fighter to fly; originally He 180, but changed to He 280 to avoid confusion with the Bü 180; development halted in 1943
8-281	Focke-Wulf Fw 281	turboprop-powered single-seat fighter (project), turboprop version of "Flitzer" jet fighter; likely an in-house designation; originally allocated to Heinkel, but was not used
8-282	Flettner Fl 282	Kolibri (Hummingbird), twin-rotor reconnaissance synchropter-layout helicopter
8-283	Focke-Wulf Ta 283	ramjet fighter, 1945 (project)
	Focke-Achgelis Fa 283	turbojet autogyro (project)
8-284	Focke-Achgelis Fa 284	twin-rotor flying crane helicopter, 1943 (prototype)
8-285	Flettner Fl 285	helicopter (project); Fl 282 with As 10 engine
8-286	Junkers Ju 286	six-engine high-altitude bomber developed from the Ju 86, 1942 (prototype)
8-287	Junkers Ju 287	single-engine dive bomber; erroneously known as the Ju 187
	Junkers Ju 287	heavy bomber (jet-engined), 1944 (prototype)
8-288	Junkers Ju 288	Key Bomber B aviation contract winner, 1941 (prototypes)
8-289	Junkers Ju 289	Allocated to Junkers, possibly not used
8-290	Junkers Ju 290	Seeadler (Sea Eagle), long-range bomber, patrol, transport
8-291	Henschel Hs 291	Possibly an air-launched anti-ship missile (project)
8-292	Argus As 292	Fernfeuer (Long-range fire), target & reconnaissance drone; number originally allocated to Henschel, but was not used
8-293	Henschel Hs 293	radio-guided glide bomb
8-294	Henschel Hs 294	radio-guided air-to-sea missile
8-295	Henschel Hs 295	rocket-boosted glide bomb (prototypes); enlarged Hs 293
8-296	Arado Ar 296	proposed development of Ar 96 built with non-strategic materials (project), but rejected by the RLM; number reassigned to Henschel
	Henschel Hs 296	radio-guided rocket-boosted glide bomb, improved Hs 293 (prototypes)
8-297	Henschel Hs 297	Föhn, unguided surface-to-air rocket; became the Hs 117
8-298	Henschel Hs 298	rocket-powered, air-to-air radio-guided missile; abandoned in early 1945
8-299	Junkers Ju 299	Allocated to Junkers, possibly not used
8-300	Focke-Wulf Fw 300	four-engine transatlantic airliner, enlarged successor to the Fw 200 (project); design handed over to SNCASO after the occupation of France

=== 301-400 ===
GL/C number	Aircraft	Notes
8-301	DFS 301	project; possibly related to DFS 346
8-302–307	Not allocated	
8-308	Messerschmitt Me 308	Original in-house designation of the MeC 164
8-309	Messerschmitt Me 309	fighter, successor to the Bf 109 (prototype); development halted in 1943
8-310	Messerschmitt Me 310	high altitude fighter, development of Me 210 (project)
8-311–312	Not allocated	
8-313	Caproni Ca.313 (captured aircraft)	twin-engine reconnaissance bomber
8-314	Not allocated	
8-315	Henschel Hs 315	possibly a missile project
8-316	Not allocated	
8-317	Dornier Do 317	bomber, development of Do 217 (prototypes) and Bomber B competitor
8-318	Dornier Do 318	flying boat, development of Do 18 (project)
8-319	Heinkel He 319	development of He 219
8-320	Messerschmitt Me 320	Allocated to Messerschmitt, possibly not used
8-321	Messerschmitt Me 321	Gigant (Giant), transport glider
8-322	Junkers Ju 322	Mammut (Mammoth), transport glider (prototype), 1941)
8-323	Messerschmitt Me 323	Gigant (Giant), transport (powered Me 321); F-series built by Luftschiffbau Zeppelin as ZMe 323F
8-324	Not allocated	
8-325	Focke-Wulf Fw 325	Allocated for Focke-Wulf, not used; may be a typo for the Fa 325 and designation may have been reserved for Focke-Achgelis and not Focke-Wulf
	Focke-Achgelis Fa 325	Krabbe (Crab), transport helicopter (project)
8-326	Not allocated	
8-327	Messerschmitt Me 327	rocket-propelled interceptor, derivative of Me 163A; possibly an initial designation for Me 163B
8-328	Messerschmitt Me 328	pulsejet fighter (prototype)
8-329	Messerschmitt Me 329	tail-less flying-wing fighter (project); 1942-1943 projected alternative to the Me 210
8-330	Focke-Achgelis Fa 330	Bachstelze (Wagtail) towed observation rotor-kite
8-331	DFS 331	cargo glider (prototype)
8-332	DFS 332	twin-fuselage cargo glider (project)
8-333	Fieseler Fi 333	transport (concept)
8-334	Arado Ar 334	Derivative of Ar 234 (project)
	Messerschmitt Me 334	tail-less fighter development of Me 163 (project); not an official RLM designation
8-335	Dornier Do 335	Pfeil (Arrow), fighter-bomber (push-pull engine configuration)
8-336	Focke-Achgelis Fa 336	scout helicopter (prototype), 1944; powered derivative of Fa 330; prototype completed postwar in France as SNCASO SE-3101
8-337	Junkers Ju 337	Allocated to Junkers, possibly not used
8-338	Not allocated	
8-339	Flettner Fl 339	reconnaissance helicopter; enlarged Fl 282
8-340	Arado Ar 340	proposed high-altitude bomber, "Bomber B" competitor; the original designation was an Arado internal project number Ar E.340. It is not known, if the number ever was assigned
8-341	Akaflieg Berlin B9	research aircraft (prone pilot). Refer to Akaflieg Berlin.
8-342	Doblhoff Wn 342	experimental tip jet helicopter (prototype)
8-343	Heinkel He 343	jet bomber (project)
8-344	Kramer Rk 344	wire-guided air-to-air missile; commonly known as Ruhrstahl X-4
	Sombold So 344	rocket-powered parasite fighter (project); probably an in-house designation
8-345	Gotha Go 345	assault glider (prototypes)
8-346	DFS 346	supersonic research aircraft (incomplete prototype only)
8-347	Kramer Rk 347	Rotkäppchen (Little Red Riding Hood), wire-guided anti-tank missile (prototypes); commonly known as Ruhrstahl X-7
8-348	Not allocated	
8-349	Bachem Ba 349	Natter (Adder or Viper), VTVL point-defense interceptor (rocket-engine)
8-352	Junkers Ju 352	Herkules, development of Ju 252 in mixed construction
8-356		allocated to Fieseler for a Fi-156 successor or for a Junkers project
8-362	Messerschmitt Me 362	three-engine jet airliner
8-364	Messerschmitt Me 364	long-range bomber, six-engine version of Me 264 (project); would have been an in-house Messerschmitt designation
8-368	Messerschmitt Me 368	Possibly allocated to Messerschmitt; no other details
8-388	Junkers Ju 388	high altitude night fighter + bomber + reconnaissance, development of Ju 188
8-390	Junkers Ju 390	Amerikabomber long-range design competitor (two prototypes built/flown), derivate of Ju 290
8-391	Focke-Wulf Fw 391	development or alternative designation of Fw 191 (project)
8-393	Arado Ar 393	Possibly allocated to Arado; no other details
8-396	Arado Ar 396	two-seat basic trainer, 1944; derivative of Ar 96, mainly built of wood; produced postwar in France
8-400	Focke-Wulf Ta 400	eight-engine, mixed-power transatlantic bomber, 1944 (project); Amerikabomber design candidate

=== 401- ===
GL/C number	Aircraft	Notes
8-409	Messerschmitt Me 409	original designation for the Messerschmitt Me 155B
8-410	Messerschmitt Me 410	Hornisse (Hornet) heavy fighter, lengthened Me 210
8-417	Dornier Do 417	medium bomber (project), development of Do 317
8-419	Heinkel He 419	high-altitude fighter, He 219 with longer wingspan
8-423	Zeppelin-Messerschmitt ZMe 423	heavy transport, enlarged Me 323 (project)
8-430	Arado Ar 430	amphibian transport (project), handed over to Dewoitine in 1942; number transferred to Gotha
	Gotha Ka 430	cargo glider (prototype), further development of the Go 242; also known as Kalkert Ka 430
8-432	Arado Ar 432	redesignation of Ar 232C
8-435	Dornier Do 435	two-seat night fighter; development of Do 335 (project)
8-440	Arado Ar 440	development of Ar 240 - prototype
8-445	Caudron C.445 (captured aircraft)	twin-engine transport
8-446	DFS 446	project; possibly related to DFS 346
8-452	Junkers Ju 452	possibly a development of the Ju 252 in wooden construction (project?)
8-462	Messerschmitt Me 462	jet bomber (project); number proposed by Messerschmitt for the P.1107, but probably not officially allocated by the RLM
8-468	DFS 468	project, no other details
8-488	Junkers Ju 488	heavy bomber, derivative of Ju 288 (project)
8-491	Focke-Wulf Fw 491	originally designated Fw 191C; Fw 191 with Jumo 211 engines
8-500	Heinkel He 500	original designation for Volksjäger project; became He 162
8-509	Messerschmitt Me 509	fighter, Me 309 development with mid-mounted engine (project)
8-510	Messerschmitt Me 510	fighter-bomber, version/derivative of Me 410 (project)
8-519	Heinkel He 519	presumed designation for a He 119 development (possibly P.1065 III)
8-520	Dewoitine D.520 (captured aircraft)	fighter
8-523	ZSO 523	six-engine military cargo transport; enlarged ZMe 323 with Gnome et Rhône 14R engines (project)
8-532	Arado Ar 532	four-engine transport (project); Ar 232 with BMW 801 engines
8-534	Avia B-534 (captured aircraft)	fighter
8-535	Heinkel He 535	mixed-power night fighter and high-speed reconnaissance aircraft, derivative of Do 335 (incomplete project); transferred to Heinkel as He 535; possibly also referred to as Do 435
8-600	Messerschmitt Me 600	proposed designation by Messerschmitt for Sack AS-7 production
8-609	Messerschmitt Me 609	heavy fighter, two Me 309 fuselages joined together (incomplete project); also known as Me 309Z
8-632	Arado Ar 632	four-engine transport; Ar 232 with BMW 801 engines
8-635	Dornier Do 635	heavy fighter, two Do 335 fuselages joined together (incomplete project); initial design work by Heinkel as the He 635; transferred to Dornier as the Do 635; transferred to Junkers as the Ju 635 who simplified the design

== See also ==
- RLM numbering system for gliders and sailplanes
- Japanese military aircraft designation systems
