= Hirth HM 506 =

1930s German aircraft engine

HM 506
- Type: Inline piston engine
- National origin: Germany
- Manufacturer: Hirth Motoren GmbH
- Major applications: Bücker Bü 133

The Hirth HM 506 was a six-cylinder air-cooled inverted inline engine that was developed from the earlier four-cylinder HM 504. The HM 506 was a popular engine for light aircraft of the 1930s to 1940s and powered the Bücker Bü 133A model trainer. The engine featured a cast magnesium alloy crankcase.

== Applications ==
- Bücker Bü 133 A
- Fieseler Fi 99
- Fieseler Fi 157 (UAV prototype)
- Fieseler Fi 158 (UAV prototype)
- Gotha Go 241
- Klemm Kl 35 B (D-ERLQ)

== Specifications (HM 506A) ==
Data from Jane's All the World's Aircraft 1938, Flugzeug-Typenbuch. Handbuch der deutschen Luftfahrt- und Zubehör-Industrie 1944

=== General characteristics ===
- Type: 6-cylinder air-cooled inverted inline
- Bore: 105 mm (4.13 in)
- Stroke: 115 mm (4.53 in)
- Displacement: 5.976 L (364.68 cu in)
- Length: 1,276 mm (50.2 in)
- Width: 490 mm (19.3 in)
- Height: 735 mm (28.9 in)
- Dry weight: 149 kg (328 lb) dry, unequipped

174 kg (384 lb) wet, equipped

=== Components ===
- Valvetrain: 1 inlet and 1 exhaust valve per cylinder, operated by push-rods and rockers
- Fuel system: 2x SUM 713/1 down draught carburetters, automatic mixture control and suitable for inverted flight.
- Fuel type: 80 Octane
- Oil system: Fresh oil, metered for each cylinder. Rockers in oil bath.
- Cooling system: air

=== Performance ===
- Power output:

- 160 PS (158 hp; 118 kW) at 2,500 rpm (5 minutes) at sea level
- 145 PS (143 hp; 107 kW) at 2,420 rpm (30 minutes) at sea level
- 130 PS (128 hp; 96 kW) at 2,330 rpm (max. continuous / cruise) at sea level

- Specific power: 26.8 PS/L (0.43 hp/cu in; 19.71 kW/L)
- Compression ratio: 6.2:1
- Specific fuel consumption: 0.220 kg/PSh (0.492 lb/(hp⋅h); 0.299 kg/kWh) at max continuous
- Oil consumption: 0.003 kg/PSh (0.007 lb/(hp⋅h); 0.004 kg/kWh) at max continuous
- Power-to-weight ratio: 1.075 PS/kg (0.481 hp/lb; 0.791 kW/kg)
- B.M.E.P.: 9.65 atm (9.78 bar; 141.8 psi)
