= Dornier Do 13 =

Type of aircraft

Do 13
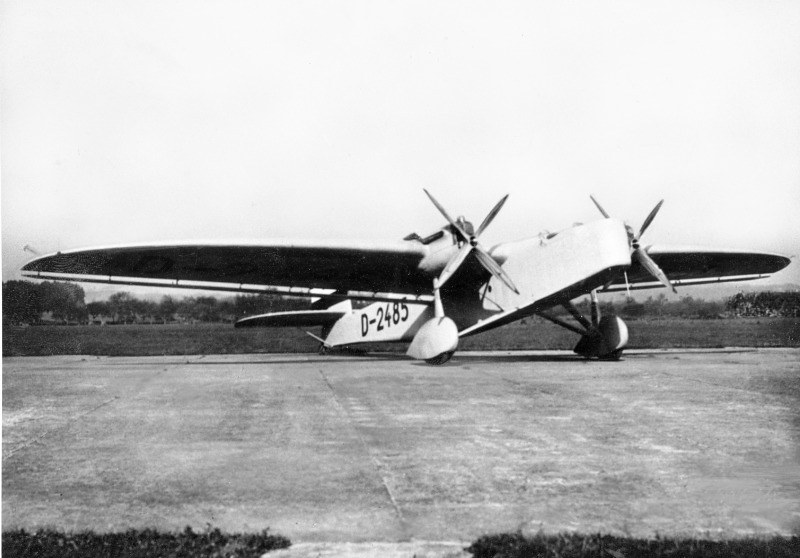

General information
- Type: Bomber
- National origin: Germany
- Manufacturer: Dornier

History
- Developed from: Dornier Do 11
- Developed into: Dornier Do 23

The Dornier Do 13 was a short-lived 1930s German bomber design. It was the designation given to the aircraft resulting from attempts to improve on the Do 11. However, only a few were built, because the design changes caused serious problems, with many of the first flights ending in crashes. Another redesign ensued, resulting in the Do 23 and Do 13s under construction were converted to the Do 23 design.

== Variants ==
- Do 13c : Initial production version.
- Do 13d : Improved version.

== Specifications (Do 13C) ==
Data from Nowarra 1933, p. 175

General characteristics

- Length: 18.75 m (61 ft 6 in)
- Wingspan: 28 m (91 ft 10 in)
- Height: 5.4 m (17 ft 9 in)
- Wing area: 112 m^{2} (1,210 sq ft)
- Gross weight: 8,600 kg (18,960 lb)
- Powerplant: 2 × BMW VI geared V-12 engines, 550 kW (740 hp) each

Performance

- Maximum speed: 260 km/h (160 mph, 140 kn)
- Range: 1,200 km (750 mi, 650 nmi) with 1,055 kg (2,326 lb) payload
- Service ceiling: 4,600 m (15,100 ft)
- Rate of climb: 2.8 m/s (550 ft/min) 18 minutes to 3,000 m (9,800 ft)

== See also ==
Related lists

- List of military aircraft of Germany
- List of RLM aircraft designations
- List of World War II military aircraft of Germany
