= Luise Hoffmann =

German aviator (1910–1935)

Luise Hoffmann (8 July 1910 – 27 November 1935) was a German aviator. She was the first woman test pilot in Germany, and possibly in Europe.

== Biography ==
Hoffmann was born in Gelsenkirchen, Germany, and began learning to fly at the age of 17. By the time she was 19, she was demonstrating aerobatics in her own biplane at air shows.

=== Aerobatics ===
Soon after she finished her apprenticeship, her parents gave her a brand new Raab-Katzenstein Kl I c Schwalbe with the serial number 70 and the registration number D-1588, which was powered by a 108 hp nine-cylinder Siemens Sh 12 radial engine. With this plane, which she called Spatz, she practiced aerobatic maneuvers, which she soon demonstrated on flight days. At the first German women's aerobatic championship on 29 May 1930, in Bonn-Hangelar, Hoffmann took second place among eight participants after Liesel Bach and ahead of Elly Beinhorn and Marga von Etzdorf.

In September 1930 she joined the Nazi Party and left again six months later. She also used her plane for propaganda purposes for the Nazi movement, especially before 1933.

Despite this success, Hoffmann had to continue to appear at airshows to earn a living and largely maintain their aircraft themselves. Women were forbidden from commercial passenger flights in Germany, and the sometimes 2,000 mark income at weekends was reduced by wages for fitters, repairs, transport and insurance.

=== Test pilot ===
Hoffmann worked as a test pilot for the Bücker Flugzeugbau company. She carried out test flights of newly built Bücker Bü 131 Jungmann aircraft and also demonstrated Bücker aircraft abroad. In 1935 she was the first pilot to fly the prototype of the Bücker Bü 133 Jungmeister single-seat aerobatic and training aircraft.

On 2 November 1935 she was returning from demonstration flights in Turkey and Greece when she encountered bad weather near Vienna, crashed and was burned badly. She later died from her injuries.
