= Dornier Do 23 =

German medium bomber

Do 23
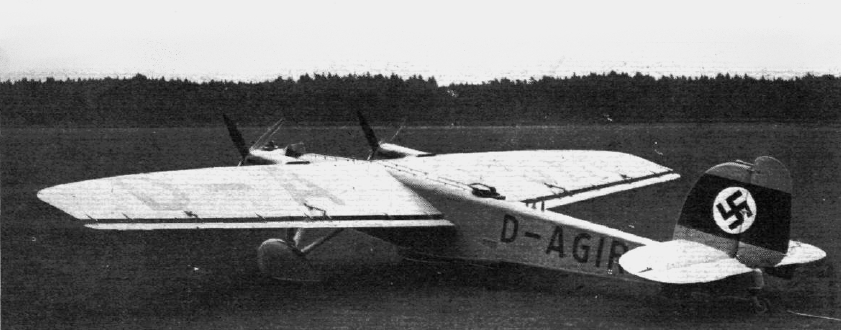

General information
- Type: Bomber
- Manufacturer: Dornier-Werke GmbH
- Primary user: Luftwaffe
- Number built: 282

History
- First flight: 1934

The Dornier Do 23 was a German medium bomber of the 1930s.

== Design and development ==
The earlier Do 11 had exhibited several problems, so two initiatives were launched to address those shortcomings. The first resulted in the Do 13. The second effort was a more extensive rework which resulted in the Do 23. With additional landing flaps at the rear of the wings several of the handling problems were corrected, but crew and military equipment were analogous to the Do 11 and performance was still considered mediocre.

Between 1934 and 1935 282 Dornier Do 23s were built for the Luftwaffe of which 273 were assigned to the units. In 1936 the machines were replaced by the first versions of the Do 17 and were transferred to the training duties. During the war, some Do 23s were used as minesweepers, known as Minensuch — literally, "mine-search" aircraft in German — and fitted with a current-carrying degaussing ring under the airframe to create a magnetic field that triggered submerged naval mines. These aircraft were usually given an -"MS" suffix to designate them, as had been done with the similarly equipped Bv 138 MS or Ju 52MS aircraft.

Experiments with spraying devices to blow off chemical warfare agents were also carried out with Do 23 with some aircraft used to fight pests.

== Variants ==
First aircraft received letters A, C, E and F which were designation of aircraft, not variants. The only production version was G.

- Do 23A: Aircraft WNr.231, registered as D-2485.
- Do 23C: Aircraft WNr.293, registered as D-AHYL.
- Do 23E: Aircraft WNr.294, registered as D-AGIR.
- Do 23F: Aircraft WNr.295, used for stress and vibration tests.
- Do 23G: Production version, manufactured in the Dornier main plants in Wismar and Friedrichshafen. Henschel and Blohm & Voss were also involved in the production with 24 aircraft each.

== Operators ==
Germany

- Luftwaffe

Hungary

- Royal Hungarian Air Force

== Specifications (Do 23G) ==
Data from Aircraft of the Third Reich Volume one, The Encyclopedia of World Aircraft

General characteristics

- Crew: 4
- Length: 18.8 m (61 ft 8 in)
- Wingspan: 25.6 m (84 ft 0 in)
- Height: 5.4 m (17 ft 9 in)
- Wing area: 106.6 m^{2} (1,147 sq ft)
- Empty weight: 5,600 kg (12,346 lb)
- Gross weight: 8,750 kg (19,290 lb)
- Max takeoff weight: 9,200 kg (20,283 lb)
- Powerplant: 2 × BMW VIU V-12 liquid-cooled piston engines, 559 kW (750 hp) each for take-off

410 kW (550 hp) maximum continuous

- Propellers: 4-bladed fixed-pitch wooden propellers

Performance

- Maximum speed: 260 km/h (160 mph, 140 kn)
- Cruise speed: 210 km/h (130 mph, 110 kn)
- Range: 1,350 km (840 mi, 730 nmi) maximum at 187 km/h (116 mph; 101 kn) and 2,500 m (8,200 ft)
- Endurance: 7 hours 30 minutes
- Service ceiling: 4,200 m (13,800 ft)
- Rate of climb: 4.5 m/s (890 ft/min) at 8,750 kg (19,290 lb)
- Time to altitude: 1,000 m (3,300 ft) in 4 minutes
- Wing loading: 85.2 kg/m^{2} (17.5 lb/sq ft)
- Power/mass: 0.12 kW/kg (0.073 hp/lb)

Armament

- Guns: 3 × 7.92 mm (0.312 in) MG 15 machine guns (nose, dorsal and ventral positions)
- Bombs: 1,000 kg (2,200 lb) of bombs carried internally.

== See also ==
Related development

- Dornier Do 11
- Dornier Do 13

Aircraft of comparable role, configuration, and era

- Handley Page H.P.54 Harrow
- Junkers Ju 52

Related lists

- List of interwar military aircraft
- List of military aircraft of Germany
- List of RLM aircraft designations
- List of World War II military aircraft of Germany
