= Bombing of Wuppertal in World War II =

During the Second World War, the city of Wuppertal suffered numerous Allied air raids, primarily nighttime attacks from the Royal Air Force's Bomber Command during its Battle of the Ruhr bomber offensive. The largest raids were on the night of 29-30 May 1943, heavy enough to cause a firestorm, and on 24-25 June. The wartime-era German fire brigades were ill-equipped to fight these fires. The RAF's airstrikes destroyed areas of Wuppertal's north-eastern Barmen, central Elberfeld and south-eastern Ronsdorf communities, mainly through incendiary area bombing, resulting in destructive firestorms. Other Allied aircraft also carried out numerous smaller air raids on Wuppertal. Overall, more than 6,500 people were killed during World War II in Wuppertal from such raids, and 38 percent of the built-up urban area was destroyed.

One of those RAF raids, in February 1943, allegedly caused serious damage to the Goldschmitt adhesives firm, which was making Tego-Film wood adhesive for the German war effort. New aircraft designs which made extensive use of wooden airframe components, such as the Focke-Wulf Ta 154 Moskito and the Heinkel He 162 Spatz, had their development seriously delayed or even temporarily curtailed as a result of the deficient replacement adhesive corroding the wooden airframes of the aircraft, resulting in crashes of the prototype airframes of both defensive fighter designs. (Note: The exact date for that critical RAF night raid is not certain. The progress on the Ta 154's development – which occurred nearly a year before the He 162's first prototypes were built – and exactly when the corrosive replacement adhesive was first used for building its production airframe series, throw doubt on the early February 1943 date.)

The other factor that led to high casualty rates in Wuppertal was its location. The city is sited on the very steep granite banks of the Wupper river. The RAF dropped timed explosives that caused the foundations of buildings to literally melt away.

One of Germany's greatest poets, Else Lasker-Schüler, born in the Wuppertal area but exiled in Palestine from 1933 until her death in 1945, asked that Wuppertal and its surrounding area be spared from Allied bombing.

== Literature ==
- Eger, Henrik. "When the singing stops on Christmas Eve in bombed-out Europe [Wuppertal]: Sitting at my computer in Philadelphia, looking back."
- Krüger, Norbert: Das historische Wuppertal. Band III: Die zerstörte Stadt. [The historic Wuppertal. Volume III: The destroyed city.] Dr. Wolfgang Schwarze Verlag.
- Pogt, Herbert: Bomben auf Wuppertal. [Bombs on Wuppertal.] Born-Verlag, ISBN 3-87093-063-2.
- Schön, Stephan (Hrsg.): Wuppertal im Kampf gegen die Not. [Wuppertal combating distress and suffering.] Hans Putty Verlag, Wuppertal 1947.

== See also ==
- List of strategic bombing over Germany in World War II

== General references ==
- May 1943. Campaign Diary. Royal Air Force. 6 April 2005. Wikidata Q131335316. Archived from the original on 6 July 2007.
