= Dornier Do 11 =

German heavy bomber

Do 11
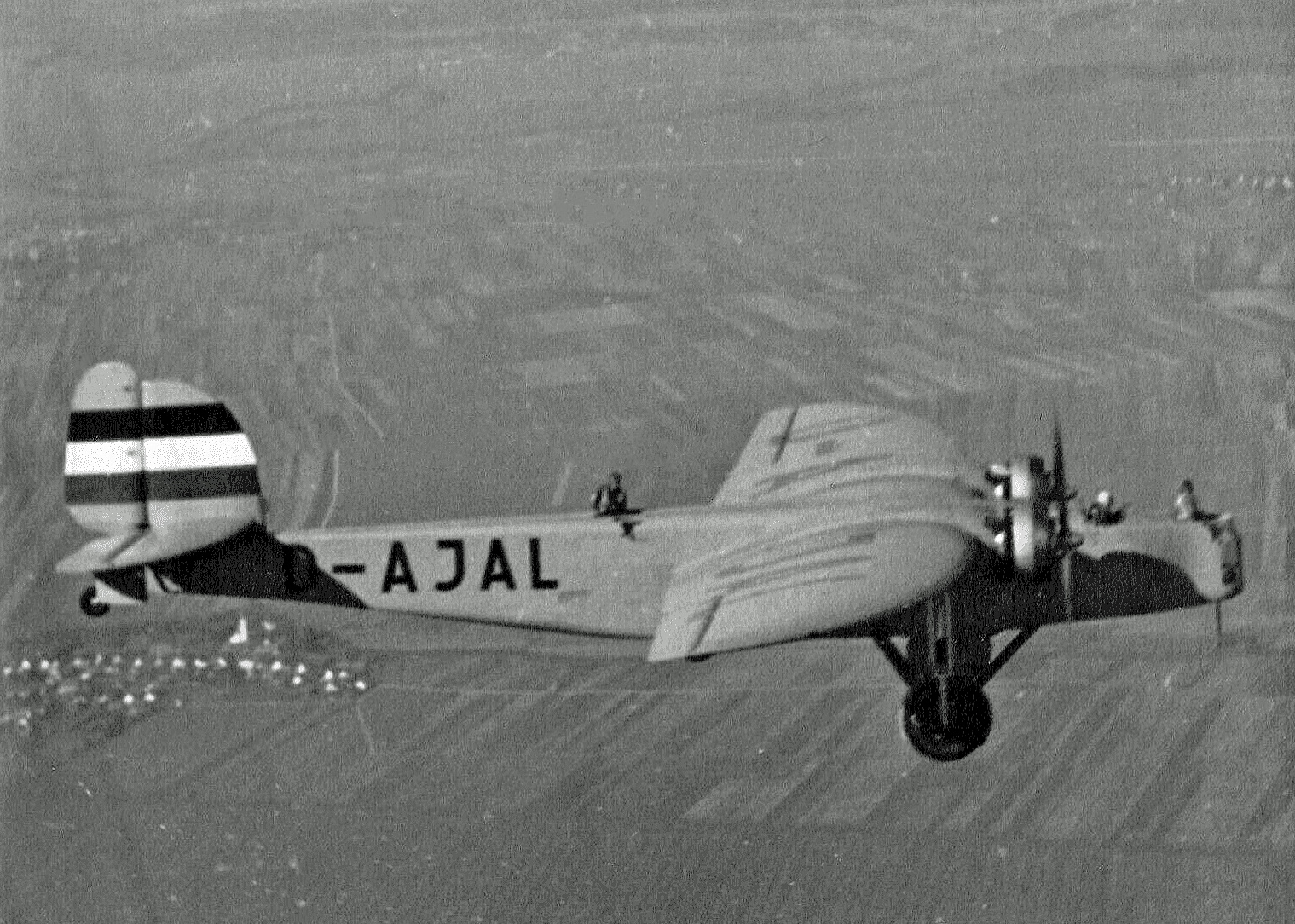
- Do 11 wearing German civil registration, with nose and dorsal crew positions manned

General information
- Type: Heavy bomber
- Manufacturer: Dornier
- Number built: 372

History
- Introduction date: 1932
- First flight: 7 May 1932
- Variants: Dornier Do 13; Dornier Do 23

The Dornier Do 11 was a German heavy bomber, developed in secret in the early 1930s. It was originally called the Dornier F before being renamed by the Reichsluftfahrtministerium (RLM) in 1933, and was considered a heavy bomber at the time. It came into service in 1932, a continuation of a line of bomber designs from the Dornier Do P in 1930, and the Dornier Do Y in 1931. The line would continue to develop with the Dornier Do 13 and Dornier Do 23.

== Design and development ==
One of the main features the Do 11 tested was a retractable undercarriage, but, due to problems with the gear, it was often left locked down. The aircraft entered service under the guise of a freight transport, and was used with the German railway in conjunction with Deutsche Luft Hansa, so that it could be shown publicly. What it was actually used for was as a trainer for the still secret Luftwaffe.

The aircraft had a number of problems, which resulted in some crashes, and was generally unpopular with pilots. Especially problematic were wing vibrations which resulted in various precautions and modifications. Attempts were made to correct its faults, resulting in the so-called Do 11D, the last model with the Do 11 name. The Do 13 was a "simplified" Do 11 and came next, but had so many problems of its own that it did not fully enter service, with several of the aircraft early off the assembly line crashing. The later Do 23 corrected many faults of the design, but was still a lackluster aircraft; meanwhile the Do 11 was withdrawn from service by 1936, replaced by superior aircraft that had since been developed.

The Do 11 is noteworthy as having served in secret and having been the main heavy bomber of the quietly developing Luftwaffe, if only for a short while. It was also the first to have two large engines as opposed to its predecessors the Y and P, which used three and four engines respectively.

== Variants ==
Data from:'

Do F
Prototype of the Do 11 before redesignation by the RLM.
Do 11C
First production version powered by two Siemens-Halske Sh.22B-2 radial engines.
Do 11D
Second production version with a shorter-span wing, primarily introduced to alleviate extreme vibration of the Do 11C wings.

== Operators ==
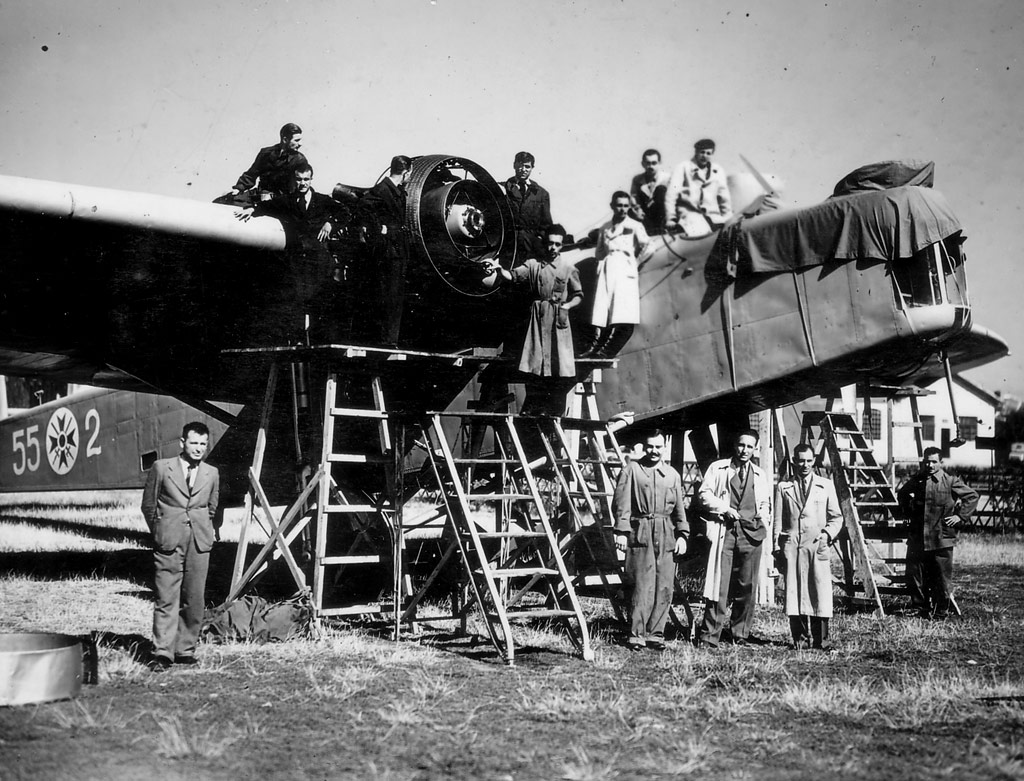
Bulgarian Air Force Do 11 undergoing maintenance

Bulgaria

- Bulgarian Air Force

Germany

- Luftwaffe

== Specifications (Do 11D) ==
Data from Aircraft of the Third Reich.

General characteristics

- Crew: four
- Length: 18.8 m (61 ft 8 in)
- Wingspan: 26.3 m (86 ft 3 in)
- Height: 5.49 m (18 ft 0 in)
- Wing area: 107.8 m^{2} (1,160 sq ft)
- Empty weight: 5,978 kg (13,179 lb)
- Max takeoff weight: 8,200 kg (18,078 lb)
- Fuel capacity: 1,545 L (340 imp gal)
- Powerplant: 2 × Siemens-Halske Sh.22B-2 9-cyl. air-cooled radial piston engines, 485 kW (650 hp) each for take-off, 447 kW (599 hp) at 1,500 m (4,900 ft)
- Propellers: 4-bladed fixed pitch wooden propellers

Performance

- Maximum speed: 260 km/h (160 mph, 140 kn)
- Cruise speed: 225 km/h (140 mph, 121 kn) at 1,000 m (3,300 ft)
- Range: 960 km (600 mi, 520 nmi) with 1,545 L (340 imp gal) of fuel
- Service ceiling: 4,100 m (13,500 ft)

Armament

- Guns: 3 x manually aimed 7.92 mm (0.312 in) MG 15 machine guns, 1 in each of open nose, dorsal and ventral positions
- Bombs: up to 1,000 kg (2,205 lb) of bombs

== See also ==
Related development

- Dornier Y
- Dornier Do 13
- Dornier Do 23

Aircraft of comparable role, configuration, and era

- Boeing YB-9
- Handley Page Heyford

Related lists

- List of interwar military aircraft
- List of military aircraft of Germany
- List of aircraft of the WW2 Luftwaffe
- List of RLM aircraft designations
