= Dornier Do P =

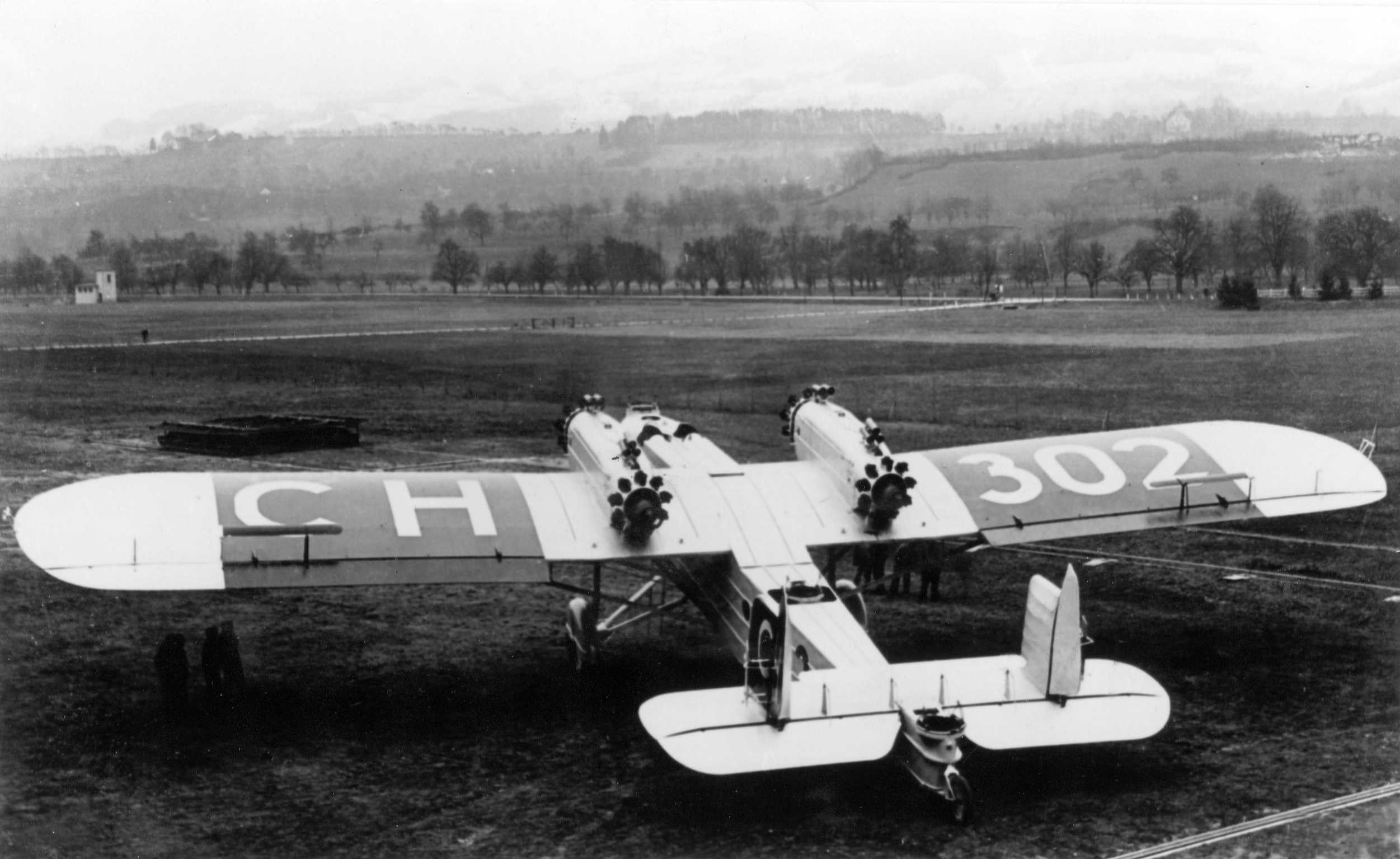

General information
- Type: Heavy bomber
- National origin: Germany
- Manufacturer: Dornier Flugzeugwerke
- Number built: 1

History
- First flight: March 31, 1930

The Dornier Do P was a German four-engined heavy bomber, manufactured by Dornier Flugzeugwerke in the 1930s. It was built as part of the secret rearmament of Germany, in opposition to the Treaty of Versailles.

== Design and development ==
Construction of the Do P began in July 1929, and its first flight took place on March 31, 1930. The aircraft was tested in such places as Lipetsk. The Do P was a monoplane constructed mainly of metal, but covered in some places by fabric. The aircraft was powered by four nine-cylinder Siemens Jupiter VI, each with 530 horsepower. The aircraft had a crew of six. It was eventually developed into the Dornier Do 11.

== Specifications ==
General characteristics

- Crew: six
- Length: 23.4 m (76 ft 9 in)
- Wingspan: 30 m (98 ft 5 in)
- Height: 6.91 m (22 ft 8 in)
- Wing area: 152.6 m^{2} (1,643 sq ft)
- Empty weight: 3,630 kg (8,003 lb)
- Max takeoff weight: 12,000 kg (26,455 lb)
- Powerplant: 4 × Siemens Jupiter VI radial, 400 kW (530 hp) each

Performance

- Maximum speed: 210 km/h (130 mph, 110 kn)
- Service ceiling: 3,500 m (11,500 ft)
