= Albatros L102 =

German trainer aircraft

L102
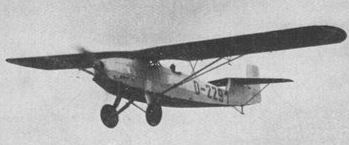

General information
- Type: Trainer
- Manufacturer: Albatros Flugzeugwerke
- Number built: 10

History
- First flight: September 1932

The Albatros L102 (company designation) / Albatros Al 102 (RLM designation), was a German trainer aircraft of the 1930s. It was a parasol-wing landplane, seating the student pilot and instructor in separate, open cockpits. A biplane floatplane version was also built as the Al 102W, with strut-braced lower wings.

== Variants ==
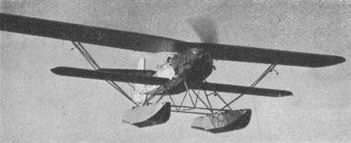
Albatros W 102 photo from L'Aerophile November 1932

- L102L

The landplane version with tailwheel undercarriage and parasol monoplane wing. Eight built.

- L102W

Two examples built as biplane floatplanes, one of which was designated as the Focke-Wulf Fw 55W.
Al 102L
RLM designation for the L102L landplane
Al 102W
RLM designation for the L102W floatplane

== Specifications (L102L) ==
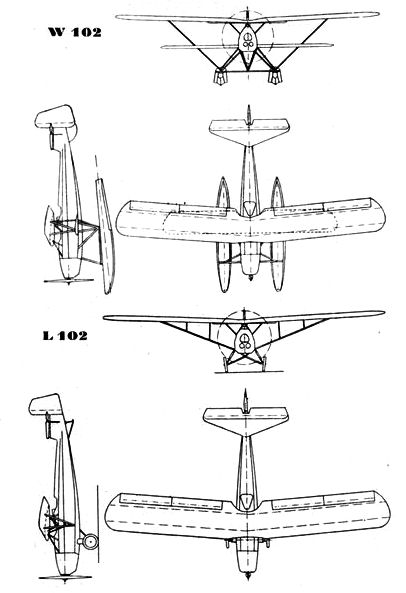
Albatros L/W 102 3-view drawing from L'Aerophile November 1932

Data from Die Deutsche Luftrüstung 1933-1945 & German Aircraft between 1919 - 1945

General characteristics

- Crew: two
- Length: 8.8 m (28 ft 10 in)

L102W: 9.4 m (31 ft)

- Wingspan: 13.3 m (43 ft 8 in)
- Height: 3.1 m (10 ft 2 in)
- Wing area: 22.2 m^{2} (239 sq ft) monoplane

Al 102W: 31.40 m^{2} (338 sq ft) (sesquiplane)

- Aspect ratio: 7.97
- Empty weight: 780 kg (1,720 lb)

L102W: 965 kg (2,127 lb)

- Gross weight: 1,200 kg (2,646 lb)

L102W: 1,350 kg (2,976 lb)

- Fuel capacity: 160 kg (353 lb) + Oil 20 kg (44 lb)

L102W: 158 kg (348 lb) + Oil 10 kg (22 lb)

- Powerplant: 1 × Argus As 10C inverted V-8, air-cooled piston engine, 177 kW (237 hp)

Performance

- Maximum speed: 210 km/h (130 mph, 110 kn) at sea level

L102W: 185 km/h (115 mph; 100 kn) at sea level

- Cruise speed: 195 km/h (121 mph, 105 kn) at sea level

L102W: 180 km/h (112 mph; 97 kn) at sea level

- Range: 680 km (420 mi, 370 nmi)

L102W: 585 km (364 mi; 316 nmi)

- Endurance: 3.5 hours

L102W: 3.25 hours

- Service ceiling: 5,000 m (16,000 ft)

L102W: 4,500 m (14,764 ft)

- Rate of climb: 4.9 m/s (960 ft/min)

L102W: 3.1 m/s (610.2 ft/min)

- Wing loading: 54.05 kg/m^{2} (11.07 lb/sq ft)

L102W: 42.99 kg/m^{2} (8.8 lb/ft^{2})
