= Messerschmitt-Caudron MeC 164 =

German/French airliner prototype

MeC 164

General information
- Type: Airliner
- National origin: Germany/France
- Manufacturer: Messerschmitt/Caudron
- Number built: 1 (incomplete)

History
- Manufactured: 1942

The Messerschmitt-Caudron MeC 164 was a prototype airliner built in 1942 by Messerschmitt and Caudron to compete with the Siebel Si 204. It did not enter mass production.

== Design and development ==
The MeC 164 was designed in Germany by Messerschmitt as an 8-passenger airliner powered by two Argus As 411 inline engines as the Me 164. as designed, it was lighter than the Si 204, but was expected to have worse performance than the competing aircraft. Once design work was completed, Messerschmitt handed it over to Caudron in Issy-les-Moulineaux, which began construction of the prototype in 1942 under the designation MeC 164 V1. However, construction of the prototype progressed slowly, and as a result the project was canceled.

== Specifications (MeC 164 V1) ==
Data from

General characteristics

- Crew: 2
- Capacity: 8 passengers
- Length: 13.50 m (44 ft 3 in)
- Wingspan: 18.80 m (61 ft 8 in)
- Height: 5.00 m (16 ft 5 in)
- Powerplant: 2 × Argus As 411 inline engine
- Propellers: 2-bladed

Performance

- Cruise speed: 384 km/h (239 mph, 207 kn)
- Range: 2,000 km (1,200 mi, 1,100 nmi)

== See also ==
Aircraft of comparable role, configuration, and era

- Avro Anson
- Beechcraft Model 18
