= Kiel FK 166 =

Type of aircraft

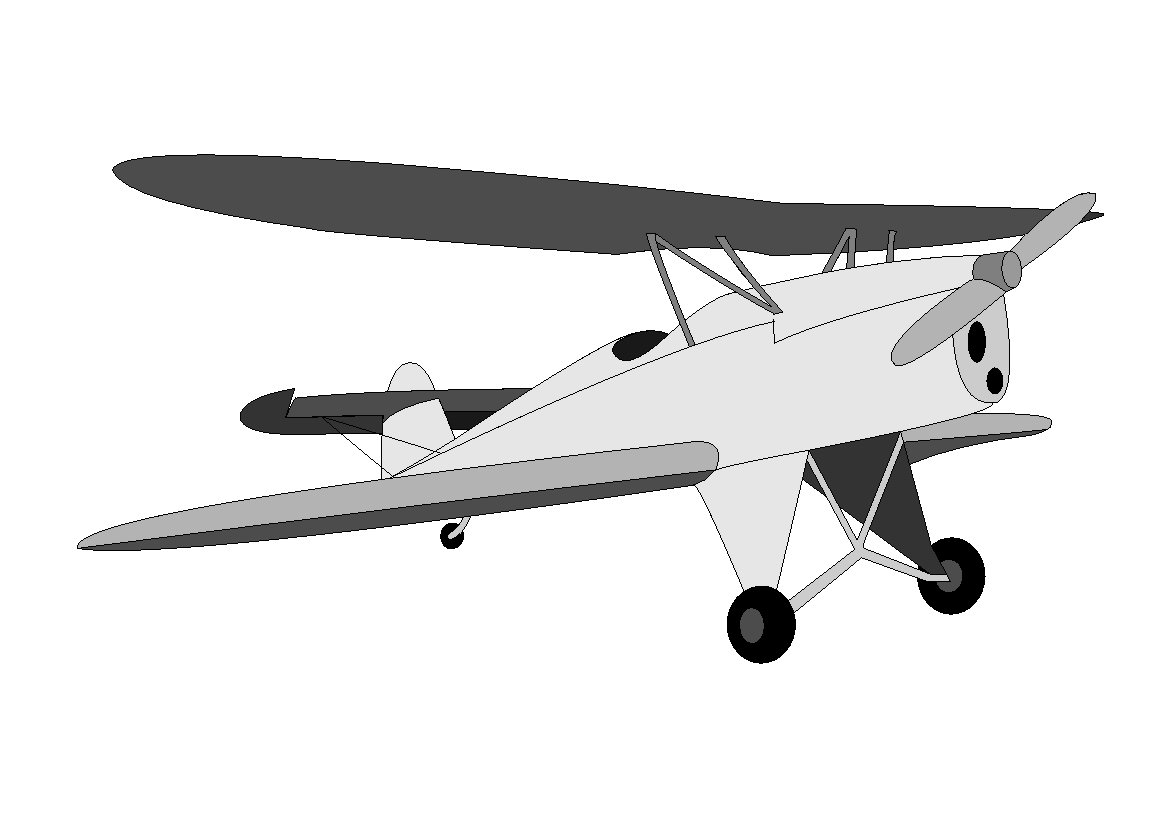

General information
- Type: Light aircraft
- National origin: Germany
- Manufacturer: Kiel Flugzeugbau
- Number built: 1

History
- First flight: 1941

The Kiel FK 166 was a single-seat prototype "exercise" biplane built by Kiel Flugzeugbau in the 1930s.

The sole FK166 (registered D-ETON) was a biplane with cantilevered wings constructed mainly of wood with fabric and plywood covering. The elliptical plan upper wings, supported only by cabane struts in the centre, were given 2.5° dihedral, spanning approx ¾ the span of the 0° dihedral lower wing. Fitted with a fixed tail-wheel undercarriage the FK166 also featured a strut braced tailplane at the tip of the fin.

== Specifications ==
Data from

General characteristics

- Crew: 1
- Length: 5.08 m (16 ft 8 in)
- Wingspan: 6.4 m (21 ft 0 in)
- Height: 2.18 m (7 ft 2 in)
- Wing area: 10.38 m^{2} (111.7 sq ft)
- Empty weight: 320 kg (705 lb)
- Gross weight: 475 kg (1,047 lb)
- Powerplant: 1 × Hirth HM 60 R inline engine, 61 kW (82 hp)

Performance

- Maximum speed: 200 km/h (120 mph, 110 kn)
- Cruise speed: 175 km/h (109 mph, 94 kn)
- Range: 450 km (280 mi, 240 nmi)
- Service ceiling: 5,800 m (19,000 ft)
