= Fieseler Fi 99 =

German sports aircraft

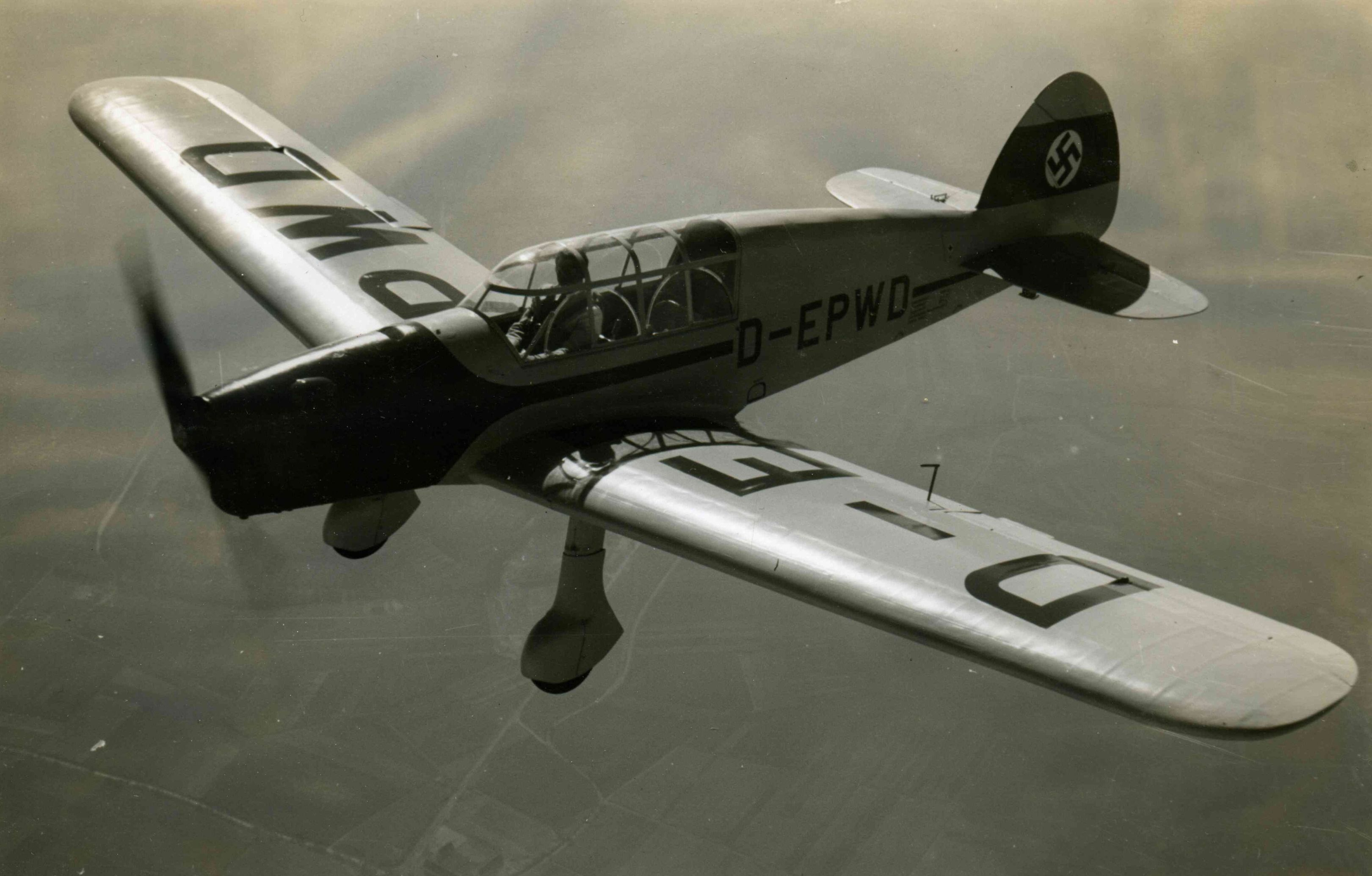
- The Fi 99 Jungtiger

General information
- Type: Sports aircraft
- National origin: Germany
- Manufacturer: Fieseler
- Number built: 1

History
- First flight: 22 April 1937

The Fieseler Fi 99 Jungtiger (English: Young Tiger) was a German sports aircraft prototype, produced by the Fieseler company. The aircraft was a low-wing two-seat aircraft with an enclosed cabin. It was powered by a Hirth HM 506A engine, producing 160 hp (119 kW). Despite its good characteristics, only one example of this tandem two-seat sport and touring plane was built in 1937

== Specifications ==
Data from Flugzeug-Typenbuch : Handbuch der Deutschen Luftfahrt- und Zubehör-Industrie 1939/40

General characteristics

- Crew: 1
- Capacity: 1 pax
- Length: 7.9 m (25 ft 11 in)
- Wingspan: 10.7 m (35 ft 1 in)
- Height: 2.15 m (7 ft 1 in)
- Width folded:2.9 m (9 ft 6 in)
- Height folded:2.95 m (9 ft 8 in)
- Wing area: 16.8 m^{2} (181 sq ft)
- Aspect ratio: 6.74
- Empty weight: 555 kg (1,224 lb)
- Gross weight: 875 kg (1,929 lb)
- Max takeoff weight: 875 kg (1,929 lb)
- Fuel capacity: 163 L (43 US gal; 36 imp gal)
- Powerplant: 1 × Hirth HM 506A six-cylinder inline piston 160 PS (158 hp; 118 kW)
- Propellers: 2-bladed wooden fixed-pitch propeller, 2.2 m (7 ft 3 in) diameter
- Propeller disc area: 3.8 m^{2} (40.9 sq ft)
- Propeller loading: 42.1 PS/m^{2} (3.9 hp/sq ft; 31.0 kW/m^{2})

Performance

- Maximum speed: 236 km/h (147 mph, 127 kn)
- Cruise speed: 223 km/h (139 mph, 120 kn)
- Landing speed: 72 km/h (45 mph; 39 kn)
- Range: 830 km (520 mi, 450 nmi)
- Endurance: 3 hours 47 minutes
- Service ceiling: 6,250 m (20,500 ft)
- g limits: +7.2 (ultimate)
- Rate of climb: 5.3 m/s (1,040 ft/min)
- Time to altitude: 1,000 m (3,300 ft) in 3 minutes 24 seconds

2,000 m (6,600 ft) in 7 minutes 30 seconds
3,000 m (9,800 ft) in 12 minutes 30 seconds

- Wing loading: 51.45 kg/m^{2} (10.54 lb/sq ft)
- Power/mass: 0.183 PS/m^{2} (0.017 hp/sq ft; 0.135 kW/m^{2})
- Fuel consumption: 5.35 km/L (12.58 mpg_{‑US}; 15.11 mpg_{‑imp})
