= Gotha Go 241 =

1940s German aircraft

General information
- Type: Tourism plane
- National origin: Germany
- Manufacturer: Gothaer Waggonfabrik
- Number built: 1

History
- First flight: 1940

The Gotha Go 241 was a low-wing twin-engined four-seat transport aircraft manufactured by Gothaer Waggonfabrik in the early 1940s and intended for the general aviation market.

== Development ==
At the beginning of the forties, Gotha decided to develop a tourism aircraft based on the positive experience of the previous two-seater Gotha Go 150. The new model, assigned the Reichsluftfahrtministerium (RLM) designation Go 241, was intended for the civil market and offered greater internal capacity, elevated to four places, even if it reiterated the general approach of Go 150.

Compared to its predecessor in the design phase, all dimensions were increased, with more powerful engines, a pair of air cooled 160 PS (160 hp; 120 kW) BMW Bramo Sh 14A radials and a twin tail unit. The aircraft was later re-ngined with 160 PS (120 kW) Hirth HM 506A inverted 6-cyl in-line engines.

The prototype was taken to the air for the first time in 1940 with good results, given that it was decided to start mass production, but given the need to give priority to aeronautical production for war purposes, the project was shelved. The only example was destroyed during an Allied bombing raid on the Gotha factory in November 1944.

== Specifications (Go 241 - Hirth engines) ==
Data from

General characteristics

- Crew: 1
- Capacity: 3 passengers
- Length: 9.02 m (29 ft 7 in)
- Wingspan: 14.50 m (47 ft 7 in)
- Height: 2.52 m (8 ft 3 in)
- Wing area: 23 m^{2} (250 sq ft)
- Empty weight: 1,370 kg (3,020 lb)
- Gross weight: 1,850 kg (4,079 lb)
- Max takeoff weight: 1,036 kg (2,284 lb)
- Powerplant: 2 × Hirth HM 506A 6-cyl inverted air-cooled inline piston engines, 120 kW (160 hp) each
- Propellers: 2-bladed fixed-pitch wooden propellers, 2.1 m (6 ft 11 in) diameter

Performance

- Maximum speed: 255 km/h (158 mph, 138 kn) at sea level
- Landing speed: 85 km/h (53 mph; 46 kn)
- Range: 740 km (460 mi, 400 nmi)
- Service ceiling: 7,600 m (24,900 ft)
- Rate of climb: 4 m/s (790 ft/min)
