= Focke-Wulf Ta 254 =

Type of aircraft

Ta 254

General information
- Type: Fighter
- Manufacturer: Focke-Wulf
- Designer: Kurt Tank
- Status: Cancelled

The Focke-Wulf Ta 254 was a proposed German development of the Ta 154 fighter, to have been produced by Focke-Wulf.

== Development ==
The Ta 254 would have been a high-wing monoplane with retractable tricycle landing gear. It was to have been powered by either two Daimler-Benz DB603E, Daimler-Benz DB 603L or Jumo 213Es piston engines. The main difference from the Ta 154 was to have been long-span wings, and it was intended to produce both day and night fighter variants.

== Specifications (Proposed with Jumo 213E) ==
Data from Jane's Fighting Aircraft of World War II

General characteristics

- Crew: two
- Wing area: 42 m^{2} (450 sq ft)
- Gross weight: 11,490 kg (25,331 lb)
- Powerplant: 2 × Junkers Jumo 213E inverted V-12 liquid-cooled piston engines, 1,300 kW (1,750 hp) each with a three-speed two-stage intercooled supercharger, 2,050 hp (1,530 kW) with MW 50 boost

Performance

- Maximum speed: 736 km/h (457 mph, 397 kn) at 10,520 m (34,510 ft) with MW50 Methanol-Water boost

Armament

- Standard Night Fighter

2 × fuselage-mounted 30 mm (1.181 in) MK 108 cannon, Schräge Musik
2 × forward-facing 20 mm (0.787 in) MG 151 cannon
2 × forward-facing 30 mm (1.181 in) MK 108 cannon

- Alternative Night Fighter

6 × forward-facing 30 mm (1.181 in) MK 108 cannon
2 × fuselage-mounted 30 mm (1.181 in) MK 108 cannon, Schräge Musik

- Day Fighter

2 × forward-facing 20 mm (0.787 in) MG 151 cannon
2 × forward-facing 30 mm (1.181 in) MK 103 cannon

== See also ==
Related lists

- List of World War II military aircraft of Germany
- List of military aircraft of Germany
