= Arado Ar 77 =

Twin-engine monoplane airplane

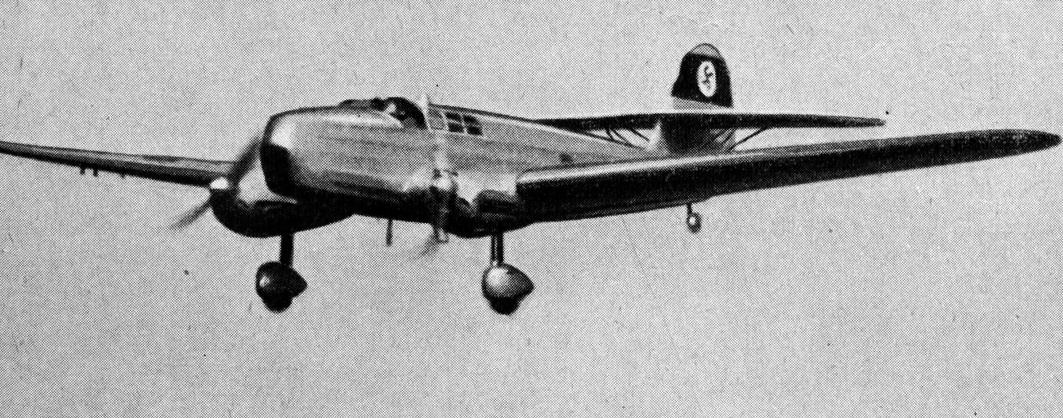

General information
- Type: Trainer
- National origin: German
- Manufacturer: Arado Flugzeugwerke
- Number built: 2

History
- First flight: 1934

The Arado Ar 77 was a German twin-engined monoplane, designed as an advanced training aircraft from 1934.

== Design ==
The Ar 77 had a thick cantilevered wooden wing, which was skinned with plywood on the undersurfaces and covered with fabric on the upper surfaces. The fuselage was built up from welded steel tubing covered with fabric. Tail surfaces were built up from steel tubing and were also fabric-covered, not following Arado's trademark layout of a fin and rudder forward of the tailplane. Instead the tailplane was high-mounted on the fin and supported by steel tube 'N' struts. Elevators and rudder were covered with fabric, aerodynamically balanced in the Ar 77A and without aerodynamic balance horns in the Ar 77B. The fixed tailwheel undercarriage consisted of cantilevered oleo-pneumatic main leg struts fitted with brakes and a tailwheel under the rear fuselage. The four crew members, being pilot, navigator or instructor, and two students, were accommodated in a cabin with full-length windows along the fuselage sides.

The Arado Ar 77 was characterised by the relatively low placement of its engines in relationship to the wings. There was room for two people in the cockpit, and four other people, such as radio operators, in the fuselage. However, the Luftwaffe criticized the aircraft, instead, preferring the Focke-Wulf Fw 58.

== Variants ==
Data from:

Ar 77a
The first prototype crew trainer, constructed using Duralumin and wood.
Ar 77b
The second prototype constructed largely of wood
Ar 77A
The proposed production version of the Ar 77a
Ar 77B
A proposed version with tail surfaces that were not aerodynamically balanced, based on the Ar 77b.

== Specifications (Ar 77A) ==
Data from Die Deutsche Luftrüstung 1933–1945, Flugzeug-Typenbuch 1944

General characteristics

- Crew: 2
- Capacity: 2 students
- Length: 12.6 m (41 ft 4 in)
- Wingspan: 19.2 m (63 ft 0 in)
- Height: 3.25 m (10 ft 8 in)
- Wing area: 50.5 m^{2} (544 sq ft)
- Aspect ratio: 7.3
- Empty weight: 1,930 kg (4,255 lb)
- Max takeoff weight: 2,940 kg (6,482 lb)
- Fuel capacity: fuel 340 L (74.79 imp gal) + oil 25 L (5.50 imp gal)
- Powerplant: 2 × Argus As 10C 8-cylinder inverted-V air-cooled, 176.5 kW (236.7 hp) each
- Propellers: 2-bladed wooden propeller, 2.3 m (7 ft 7 in) diameter

Performance

- Maximum speed: 240 km/h (150 mph, 130 kn) at sea level
- Cruise speed: 200 km/h (120 mph, 110 kn)
- Stall speed: 84 km/h (52 mph, 45 kn)
- Range: 720 km (450 mi, 390 nmi)
- Endurance: 3 hours 36 minutes
- Service ceiling: 5,000 m (16,000 ft) on two engines

1,800 m (5,900 ft) on one engine

- g limits: +7 (ultimate)
- Rate of climb: 4.76 m/s (937 ft/min)
- Time to altitude: 1,000 m (3,300 ft) in 3 minutes 30 seconds
- Wing loading: 57.2 kg/m^{2} (11.7 lb/sq ft)
- Power/mass: 0.166 PS/kg (0.122 kW/kg; 0.074 hp/lb)
- Fuel consumption: 0.59 L/km (0.25 US gal/mi; 0.21 imp gal/mi)
