= Bücker Bü 133 Jungmeister =

Training biplane

Bü 133 Jungmeister
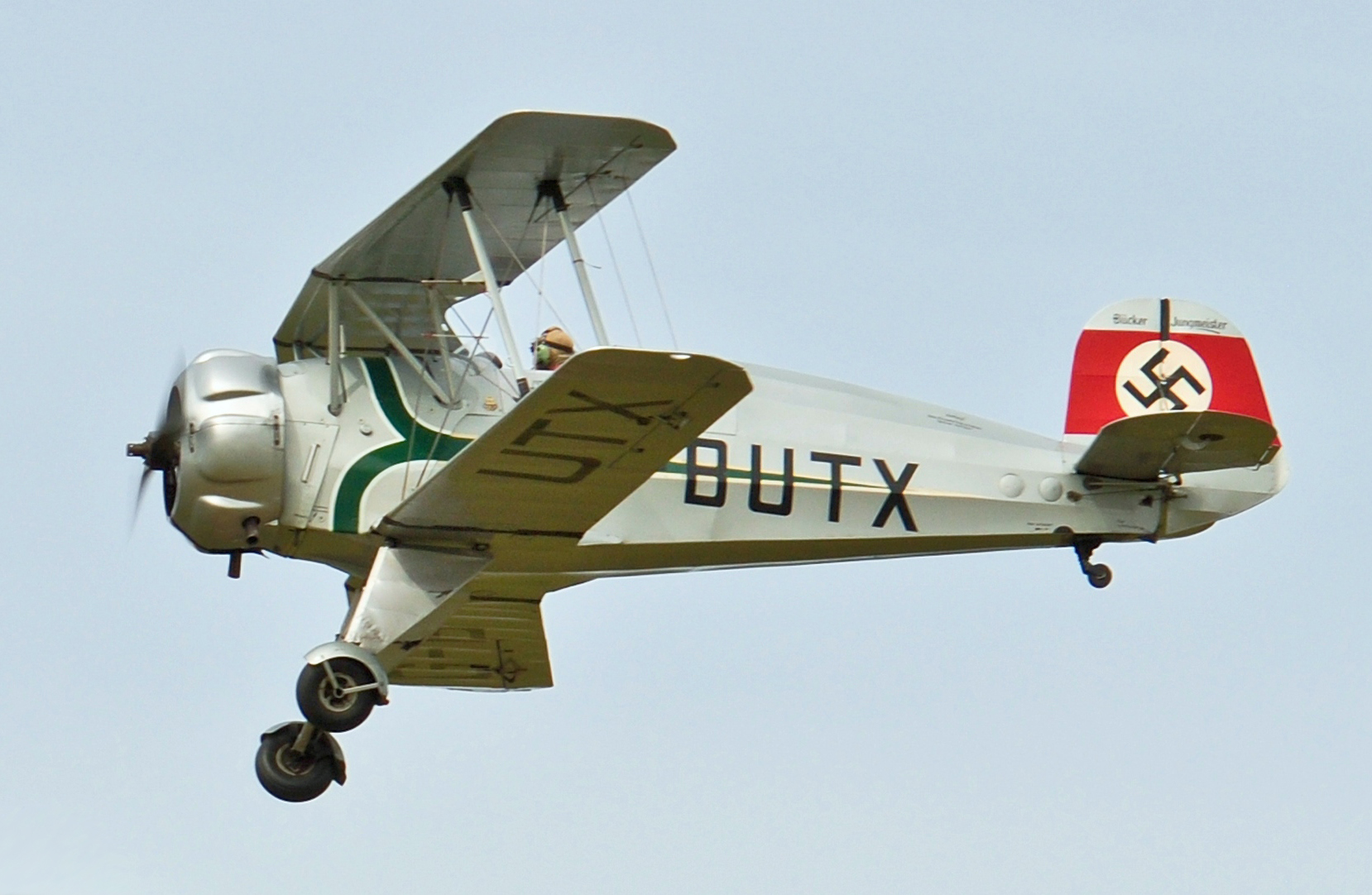
- Bü 133C Jungmeister performing at the Shoreham Airshow 2013

General information
- Type: Single-seat advanced trainer
- National origin: Germany
- Manufacturer: Bücker Flugzeugbau
- Built by: CASA; Dornier Flugzeugwerke
- Primary users: Luftwaffe Spain; Switzerland
- Number built: around 250

History
- Developed from: Bücker Bü 131 Jungmann

The Bücker Bü 133 Jungmeister is an advanced trainer of the Luftwaffe in the 1930s. It was a single-engine, single-seat biplane of wood and tubular steel construction and covered in fabric.

== Development ==
The Bü 133 was a development of the Bücker Bü 131 Jungmann two-seat basic trainer. First flown in 1935 (by Luise Hoffmann, the first female test pilot in Germany), it was slightly smaller than the Bü 131. The prototype, D-EVEO, was powered by a 140 hp (104 kW) Hirth HM506 inverted, air-cooled inline-6 engine.

The aircraft showed "astonishing agility" at its first public appearance, the 1936 International Aerobatic Championship at Rangsdorf, but the Bü 133A garnered no orders; only two Bü 133Bs, with 160 hp (119 kW) Siemens-Halske Sh.14A-4 radial engines, were built.

The main production type was the 160 hp (119 kW) Siemens-Bramo Sh 14A radial powered Bü 133C, which had a distinctive cowling and a 13 cm (5.1 in)-shorter fuselage, and the same fine aerobatic performance as the Bü 133A.

Fifty-two were manufactured under licence by Dornier Flugzeugwerke for the Swiss Air Force (which kept it in service until 1968). Twenty five Jungmeisters, initially powered by Hirth HM506 engines, were licence-built for the Spanish Air Force from 1940–42 by CASA with the designation CASA 1-133L, although they were later re-engined with Sh 14 engines. They joined the survivors of 22 German-built Bü-133Cs in Spanish service.

In the 1960s, the American pilot Jack Canary obtained construction plans for the Bü-133 from Spain and a production licence from Carl Bücker, with the intention of restarting production of the Jungmeister in Germany to meet an expected high demand from the United States. The first new-build aircraft was completed by the Wolf Hirth factory at Nabern being completed in 1968. Jack Canary was killed later that year during the production of the film Tora! Tora! Tora!, however, and his death caused the project to lose momentum, with poor sales (partly due to the high cost of the new-build aircraft together with the availability of ex-Swiss Jungmeisters on the civil market) caused Hirth to stop production in 1971 after four aircraft had been built. Several aircraft were later completed from components built during this project, with two aircraft built in Austria in the 1970s, one built in France in 1991 and another completed by Hirth in 1991.

== Operational history ==
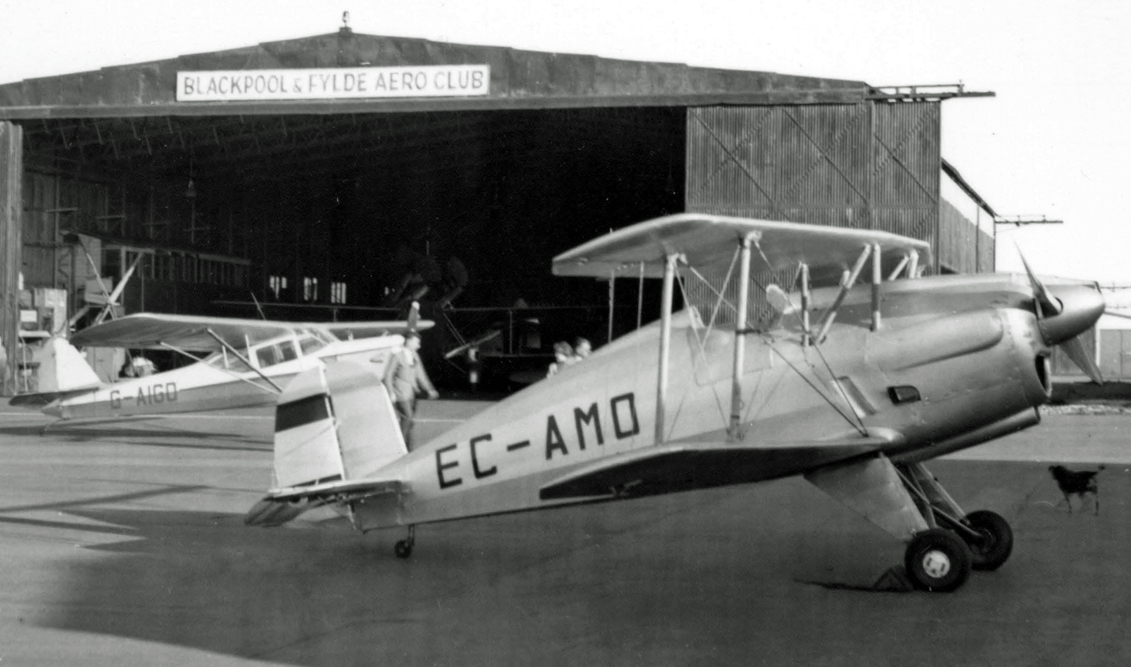
CASA-built 1-133C Jungmeister at Blackpool (Squires Gate) Airport in 1957

The Bü 133C racked up numerous victories in international aerobatic competition, and by 1938 was the Luftwaffe's standard advanced trainer. At the Brussels meet that year, a three-man Luftwaffe team made a strong impression on Reichsmarschall Hermann Göring, who ordered a nine-man team be formed. It dazzled the crowds at the International Flying meet in Brussels the next year.

The Jungmeister design remained competitive in international aerobatic competition into the 1960s.

== Variants ==
Bücker Bü 133A
First prototype - initially powered by 135 PS (133 hp; 99 kW) Hirth HM 6 inline engine as Bü 133 A-1. Later rebuilt with 160 PS (160 hp; 120 kW) Hirth HM 506A.
Bücker Bü 133B
Proposed version with 150 PS (150 hp; 110 kW) Argus As 8 engine. Unbuilt.
Bücker Bü 133C
160 PS (160 hp; 120 kW) Siemens-Halske Sh 14A engine.
Bücker Bü 133D
Improved production version using roller bearings for rudder, powered by Sh 14A engine.
CASA 1.133
Spanish-built variant.
Price/American Tiger Club Jungmeister
Plans for homebuilt construction.
SSH T-133PA
Modern (1990s-2000s) new build, Sh 14A-powered, Jungmeister by Polish company SSH (Serwis Samolotów Historycznych). One prototype built.

== Operators ==
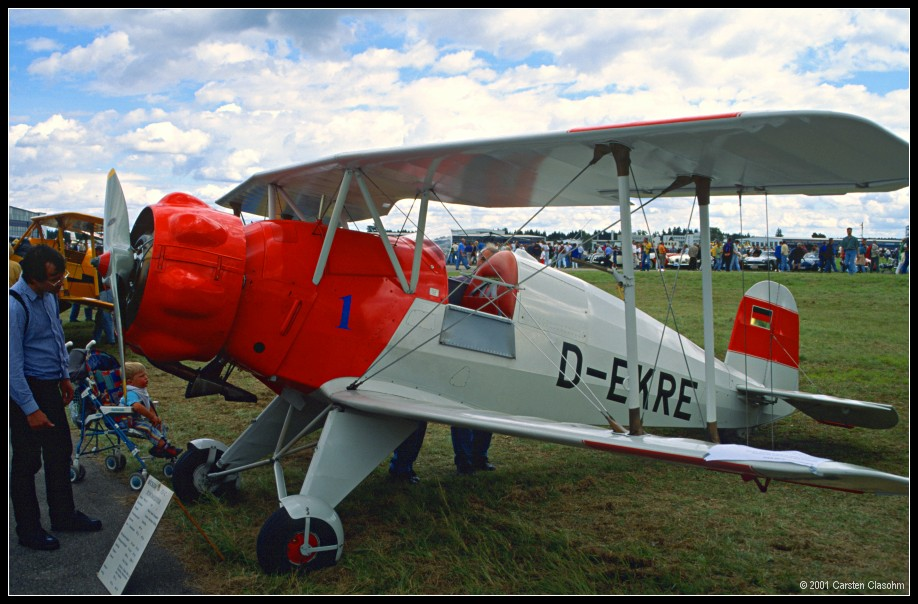
Bücker Bü 133 Jungmeister in civilian ownership

Independent State of Croatia

- Zrakoplovstvo Nezavisne Države Hrvatske

Nazi Germany

- Luftwaffe

Hungary

- Hungarian Air Force

Lithuania

- Lithuanian Air Force (6 acquired in 1939)
- Aeroclub of Lithuania (2 units)

Poland

- Polish Air Force (1 bought for tests before 1939)

Romania

- Romanian Air Force

Slovakia

- Slovak Air Force (1939–1945)

(Spain) Spanish Republic

- Spanish Republican Air Force

(Spain) Spanish State

- Spanish Air Force

South Africa

- South African Air Force

Switzerland

- Swiss Air Force

Soviet Union

- Soviet Air Force (following the occupation of Baltic States, at least three former Lithuanian Bü 133C's were transferred to aviation of 29th Territorial Infantry Corps)

Yugoslavia

- SFR Yugoslav Air Force - Postwar.

== Specifications (Bücker Bü 133C) ==
Data from The Concise Guide to Axis Aircraft of World War II - David Mondey

General characteristics

- Crew: 1
- Length: 6 m (19 ft 8 in)
- Wingspan: 6.6 m (21 ft 8 in)
- Height: 2.2 m (7 ft 3 in)
- Wing area: 12 m^{2} (130 sq ft)
- Airfoil: Clark Y modified
- Empty weight: 425 kg (937 lb)
- Max takeoff weight: 585 kg (1,290 lb)
- Powerplant: 1 × Siemens-Halske Sh.14A-4 7-cylinder air-cooled radial piston engine, 119 kW (160 hp)
- Propellers: 2-bladed fixed-pitch propeller

Performance

- Maximum speed: 220 km/h (140 mph, 120 kn)
- Cruise speed: 200 km/h (120 mph, 110 kn)
- Range: 500 km (310 mi, 270 nmi)
- Service ceiling: 4,500 m (14,800 ft)

== See also ==
Related development

- Bücker Bü 131 Jungmann

Related lists

- List of aircraft of the Spanish Republican Air Force
- List of interwar military aircraft
- List of military aircraft of Germany
