= Fieseler Fi 158 =

German research aircraft

Fi 158
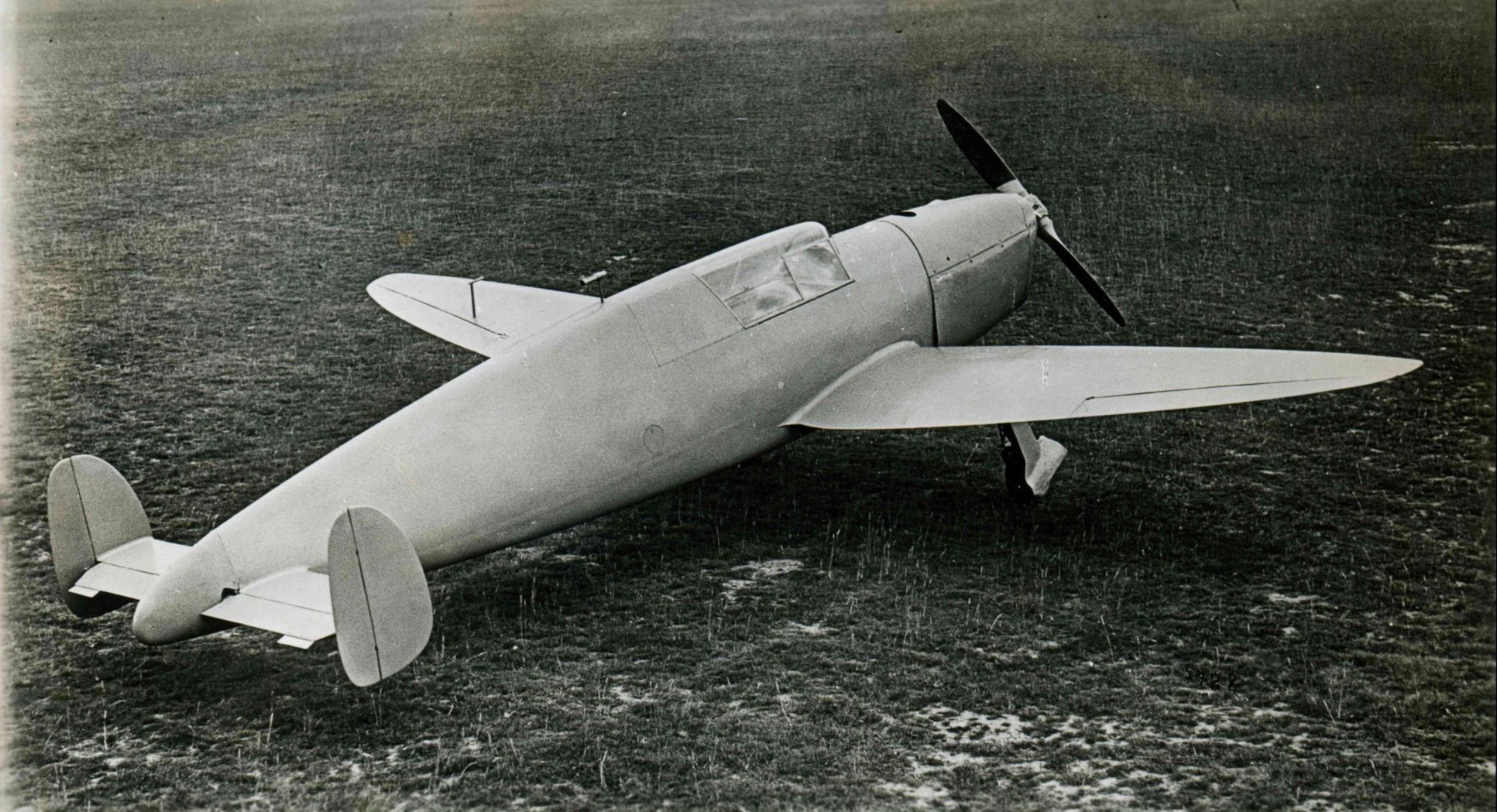
- The Fi 158 at Kassel-Waldau Airfield

General information
- Type: Research aircraft
- National origin: Germany
- Manufacturer: Fieseler Flugzeugbau Kassel
- Number built: 1

History
- First flight: 9 March 1938
- Developed from: Fieseler Fi 157

The Fieseler Fi 158 was a civilian research aircraft designed and built in Germany from 1938.

== Design and development ==
Designed as a manned version of the Fi 157 radio-controlled drone, the Fi 158 was a low-winged monoplane built largely of wood, with a retractable tailwheel undercarriage and twin fins and rudders, with the crew sitting in tandem in an enclosed cabin. Limited flight testing was carried out before it was placed in the Deutsche Luftfahrt Sammlung (German Aviation Collection) in Berlin as a permanent exhibit in 1939. Unfortunately, the museum and almost all of the aircraft in it was destroyed on the night of 23/24 November 1943 during an RAF air raid.

== Specifications (Fi 158 V1) ==
Data from Aircraft of the Third Reich

General characteristics

- Crew: 1 or 2 (sources differ)
- Length: 6.6 m (21 ft 8 in)
- Wingspan: 7 m (23 ft 0 in)
- Height: 1.7 m (5 ft 7 in)
- Wing area: 7 m^{2} (75 sq ft)
- Empty weight: 494 kg (1,089 lb)
- Gross weight: 646 kg (1,424 lb)
- Powerplant: 1 × Hirth HM 506A 6-cyl. inverted air-cooled in-line piston engine, 119 kW (160 hp)
- Propellers: 2-bladed variable-pitch propeller

Performance

- Maximum speed: 350 km/h (220 mph, 190 kn) at sea level
- Cruise speed: 300 km/h (190 mph, 160 kn)
- Range: 370 km (230 mi, 200 nmi)
- Service ceiling: 6,700 m (22,000 ft)
- Rate of climb: 8.33 m/s (1,640 ft/min)
- Time to altitude: 1,000 m (3,300 ft) in 2 minutes
