= Focke-Wulf Fw 58 Weihe =

German twin-engine multi-role aircraft

Fw 58 Weihe
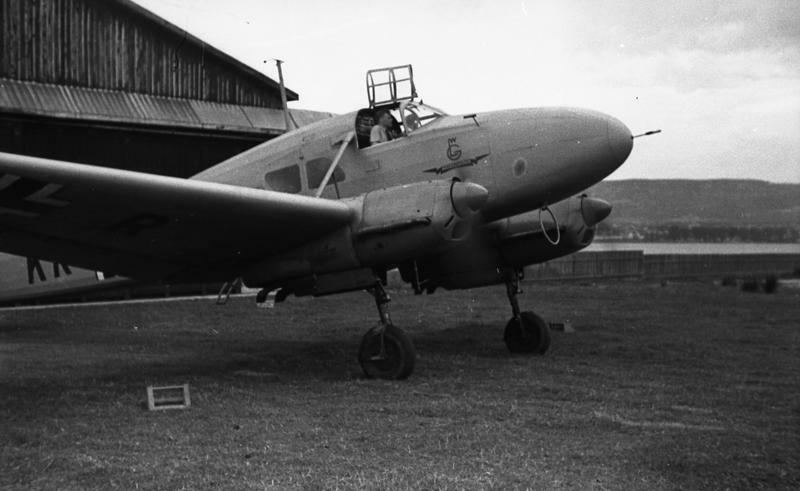

General information
- Type: Trainer, Transport, Air Ambulance
- Manufacturer: Focke-Wulf
- Primary user: Luftwaffe
- Number built: 1,350

History
- Introduction date: 1937
- First flight: 1935
- Retired: 1940s

The Focke-Wulf Fw 58 Weihe (Harrier) was a twin-engine multi-role aircraft designed and produced by the German aircraft manufacturer Focke-Wulf.

It was developed in response to a request from the Luftwaffe, which sought a multi-role aircraft that could be operated as an advanced trainer for pilots, gunners and radio operators alike. The resulting Fw 58 was a low-wing monoplane powered by a pair of Argus As 10C V-8 piston engines mounted in nacelles on the wing's leading edges. The crew were seated under an enclosed canopy. Aft of the flight deck, the fuselage was open to form a moveable MG 15 machine gun station. The tailwheel undercarriage was retractable. The nose could either be glazed or faired over. The first prototype performed its maiden flight in 1935; the Fw 58 entered regular service two years later.

The Fw 58 was procured in large numbers by the Luftwaffe and thus was widely used across Germany for the training of several categories of military personnel. Furthermore, the type was routinely operated in other capacities, including as a VIP transport, air ambulance, feeder airliner, photo reconnaissance and weather research aircraft. It was also operated as an airliner by the German flag carrier Deutsche Luft Hansa. Several were owned by private pilots, including the aeronautical engineer Kurt Tank. Outside of Germany, the type was built under license by several other nations, including Bulgaria, Hungary and Brazil. Other nations that procured the Fw 58 included the Netherlands, Sweden, Romania, Croatia and Turkey.

== Design and development ==
Work on the Fw 58 commenced during the early 1930s; its development was closely paralleled by the Arado Ar 77, which was designed to fulfil the same specification.

The Fw 58 featured welded steel tube construction across its fuselage along with mixed materials for its covering. It had a semi-cantilever wing that was primarily metal, but made use of fabric aft of the spar. This wing was mounted relatively low on the fuselage, the centre sections of which were braced between the uppermost point of the engine mounting and the fuselage. In contrast, the tailplane, which was positioned forward of the fin, was braced from beneath via struts. The underside of both of the engine nacelles featured a recess into which the main undercarriage retracted into during flight. The Fw 58 was powered by a pair of Argus As 10C V-8 inverted air-cooled piston engines, capable of generating up to 240 PS (240 hp; 180 kW).

During 1935, the first prototype conducted its maiden flight. It was quickly joined by the second prototype which, unlike the first, had been constructed to a military configuration; one of the more prominent visual differences between the two aircraft was the presence of defensive MG 15 machine guns in the nose and dorsal positions of the latter. The configuration of the second prototype, sometimes referred to as Fw 58A, did not actually correspond to many of the quantity production aircraft as production was quickly transitioned to the improved Fw 58B, which most closely corresponded to the design of the fourth prototype. This model featured the ability to carry bombs and could even be outfitted with floats; when in the latter configuration, the aircraft was designated as Fw 58BW. However, the definitive production model was the Fw 58C, which had a faired-in nose and could accommodate up to six passengers.

== Operational history ==
A major customer for the Fw 58 was the Luftwaffe, a large number of its operational units were equipped with multiple aircraft, either Fw 58Bs or Fw 58Cs, for light transport and communications purposes. The type would see use as an air ambulance and several other secondary roles, including aerial application for agricultural products. At least 30 specially configured Fw 58s were deployed to the Eastern Front to spray potential sources of disease for German ground forces.

Between 1938 and 1939, eight aircraft in an airliner were supplied to the German flag carrier Deutsche Luft Hansa. Furthermore, a few aircraft were used for various experimental purposes, including early trials of aerial refuelling apparatus. Numerous private pilots, including the aeronautical engineer Kurt Tank (who had headed the design of the Fw 58), operated the type as a personal aircraft.

== Variants ==
Fw 58 V1
First prototype, first flown in 1934
Fw 58 V2
Second prototype.
Fw 58 V3
Third prototype.
Fw 58 V4
Fourth prototype.
Fw 58 V14
Fw 58 V14, D- OPDR, was fitted with Fowler flaps and boundary layer suction for high-lift experiments at AVA, Göttingen. The suction system was powered by a Hirth aircraft engine in the fuselage and the air exited through two circumferential, parallel rows of slots in the rear fuselage section.
Fw 58B
Fw 58B-1
Fw 58B-2
This version had a glazed nose and was armed with a 7.92 mm (0.312 in) MG 15 machine gun.
Fw 58C
Solid-nosed, the main wartime production variant, six passenger transport with 260hp Hirth HM 508D engines
Fw 58W
Twin-float floatplane version.
D2FW
Brazilian Navy designation for Focke-Wulf-built Fw 58B.
D2AvN
Brazilian Navy designation for license-built Fw 58B.

== Operators ==
Austria

- Austrian Air Force

Argentina

- Argentine Air Force - three imported, (1938–1952)

Brazil

- Brazilian Navy - license-built from 1938
- Brazilian Air Force
- Syndicato Condor
- Varig

Bulgaria

- Bulgarian Air Force - eight imported in 1937-1939

Croatia

- Croatian Air Force

Czechoslovakia

- Czechoslovak Air Force

Finland

- Finnish Air Force

Nazi Germany

- Luftwaffe

Hungary

- Hungarian Air Force - license production

Netherlands

- Royal Netherlands Air Force

Norway

- Royal Norwegian Air Force (Postwar)

Poland

- Polish Air Force

Romania

- Royal Romanian Air Force
- Romanian Air Force (Postwar)
- Transnistrian air section

Slovakia

- Slovak Air Force (1939–1945)

Spain

- Spanish Air Force

Sweden

- Swedish Air Force - four imported for aerial surveying under civil mapping agency contract

Turkey

- Turkish Air Force - at least six imported, received 1937

Soviet Union

- Soviet Air Force

== Surviving aircraft ==
The only Fw 58 on display is at Museu Aeroespacial in Rio de Janeiro, Brazil. Brazil used this airplane mainly for maritime patrols and the example on display was one of the 25 Fw 58B-2 units license-built in Brazil by Fábrica de Galeão, circa 1941.

An Fw 58 C-2 is stored in the Norwegian Aviation Museum in Bodø.

An Fw 58 C crashed on 30 March 1943 in the Lac du Bourget, France, after a low-flying training pass over the lake went wrong. Two of the four airmen on board were rescued by local fishermen. The wreckage lies at a depth of over 112 meters. Due to the dark and cold water, it is still fairly well preserved, though the canvas over the tube frame light structure is gradually deteriorating. A proposal has been made to raise the wreckage, but local divers are strongly opposed because of its status as a war grave, and the risks of damaging it.

== Specifications (Fw 58B) ==
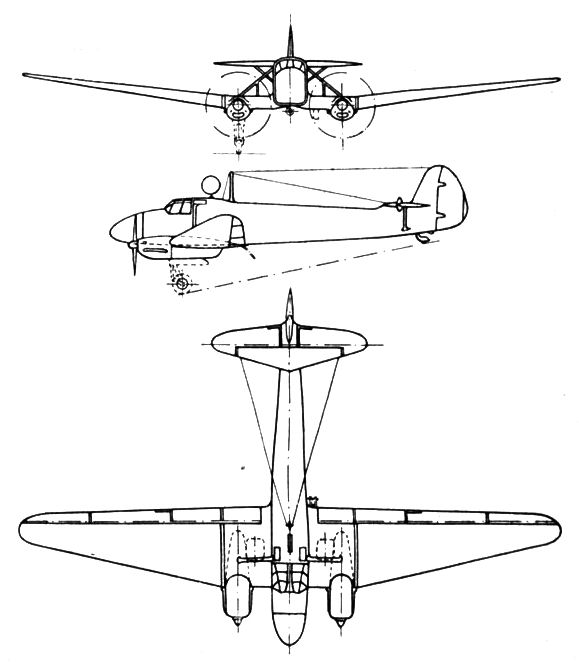
Focke-Wulf Fw.58 3-view drawing from L'Aerophile February 1936

Data from Die Deutsche Luftrüstung 1933–1945 Vol.2 – Flugzeugtypen Erla-Heinkel

General characteristics

- Crew: Four
- Length: 14.1 m (46 ft 3 in)
- Wingspan: 21 m (68 ft 11 in)
- Height: 4.2 m (13 ft 9 in)
- Wing area: 47 m^{2} (510 sq ft)
- Airfoil: NACA 2212
- Empty weight: 2,000 kg (4,409 lb)
- Gross weight: 2,930 kg (6,460 lb)
- Fuel capacity: 340 L (90 US gal; 75 imp gal) in two centre-section tanks, with a 34 L (9.0 US gal; 7.5 imp gal) oil tank
- Powerplant: 2 × Argus As 10C V-8 inverted air-cooled piston engines 240 PS (240 hp; 180 kW)
- Propellers: 2-bladed variable-pitch propeller, 2.5 m (8 ft 2 in) diameter

Performance

- Maximum speed: 254 km/h (158 mph, 137 kn) at sea level
- Cruise speed: 238 km/h (148 mph, 129 kn) * Landing speed: 76 km/h (47 mph; 41 kn)
- Range: 690 km (430 mi, 370 nmi)
- Service ceiling: 5,400 m (17,700 ft)
- Rate of climb: 4.67 m/s (919 ft/min)
- Time to altitude: 1,000 m (3,300 ft) in three minutes and 48 seconds
- Wing loading: 59.8 kg/m^{2} (12.2 lb/sq ft)

Armament

- Guns: * 2 × 7.92 mm (.312 in) MG 15 machine guns

== See also ==
Related lists

- List of aircraft of World War II
- List of World War II military aircraft of Germany
- List of military aircraft of Germany
