= Focke-Wulf Ta 154 Moskito =

German night fighter aircraft during late World War II

Ta 154
- Prototype Ta 154 V1 (TE+FE)

General information
- Type: Night Fighter
- Manufacturer: Focke-Wulf
- Designer: Kurt Tank
- Primary user: Luftwaffe
- Number built: 28 (3 prototype, 15 preproduction, 10 production)

History
- First flight: 1 July 1943
- Variant: Focke-Wulf Ta 254

The Focke-Wulf Ta 154 Moskito was a fast twin-engined night fighter aircraft designed by the German aeronautical engineer Kurt Tank and produced by the aircraft manufacturer Focke-Wulf. It was unofficially named Moskito due to its similarities with the de Havilland Mosquito (which was also largely made of wood) that were already in service with the Royal Air Force (RAF).

The Ta 154 commenced development in 1942 and was worked on during much of the latter half of the Second World War. It was designed to replace variants of the Messerschmitt Bf 110 and Junkers Ju 88 and function as a specialised night fighter. As per a stipulation issued by the Reichsluftfahrtministerium (RLM), over half of the material needed to build the Ta 154 would comprise wood. A special phenolic resin adhesive called Tego film was used to bond sections together. It was originally designated Ta 211 in reference to the intended Jumo 211R engine, although it was subsequently decided to adopt the more powerful Jumo 213 powerplant instead. Following a review of Focke-Wulf's submission, a development contract was issued to the company during late 1942.

On 1 July 1943, the prototype Ta 154 V1 performed its maiden flight; it was piloted by Kurt Tank. One of the early prototypes undertook competitive flight testing against both the Heinkel He 219 and the Junkers Ju 388, besting both of these rival aircraft. During March 1944, even though the first eight pre-production aircraft were yet to be completed, the Jägerstab decreed that 37 Ta 154s ought to be completed by May 1944 and that 250 aircraft were to be produced each month by November 1944. This schedule proved highly unrealistic in light of various technical and logistical issues, with key parts (such as engines) not being available in sufficient quantity. Perhaps most crucially, the only factory that produced Tego-Film, in Wuppertal, was bombed by the RAF while replacement bonding agents proved to be inferior and a source of catastrophic mid-flight structural failures.

During September 1944, amid a complete production stoppage, the RLM opted to terminate the Ta 154 programme. Only a few production standard aircraft were completed, and these proved to possess less impressive performance than the prototypes. Several pre-production aircraft were also converted for operational use. Several Ta 154s were flown by Nachtjagdgeschwader 3 (Night Fighter Wing 3) while a handful are believed to have been also used as training aircraft for jet pilots. Furthermore, at least three Pulkzerstörer (Formation Destroyer) and Mistel parasite fighter schemes were mooted for the type.

== Development ==
=== Background ===
The origins of the Ta 154 Moskito is closely linked to the wartime demands of the Luftwaffe. In 1942, it had become increasing clear that, amid increasingly intense Allied bombardment of Germany, a new type of night fighter was desirable to replace both the Messerschmitt Bf 110 and Junkers Ju 88. One such aircraft, the Heinkel He 219, was already in development, however, during September 1942, the Reichsluftfahrtministerium (RLM) issued a fresh requirement that called for a specialised night fighter that, unlike the He 219, would be primarily constructed out of wood. The intended benefit of this decision was not only as an economic measure to minimise the use of metal but also to take advantage of Germany's available labour pool, which had numerous skilled woodworkers that had not effectively transitioned to metalworking.

This requirement was received by the German aircraft manufacturer Focke-Wulf, who quickly decided to undertake work towards fulfilling it. A Bremen-based design team at the firm, headed by Kurt Tank, set about studying a fast attack-bomber aircraft that had been initially designated Ta 211 (due to its planned use of an uprated Jumo 211R engine). The envisioned Ta 21 bomber was a high-wing twin-engined design, built primarily of plywood and bonded with a special phenolic resin adhesive called Tego film. The material composition of the basic design included approximately 57 per cent wood, 30 per cent steel, and 13 per cent duralumin. Both single-seat and twin-seat variants were proposed at a relatively early stage.

Due to the scarcity of steel tubing, both the primary and auxiliary spars made use of wood box construction while extensive use of wood bonding was made across the whole airframe. A retractable nose-wheel undercarriage was selected, the main gear of which retracted rearwards into recesses within the engine nacelles while the nose gear pivoted backwards into the fuselage. Furthermore, it was fitted with broad diameter tyres as to permit the aircraft to use grass airstrips. It had a stepped cockpit canopy, the windscreen of which was composed of armoured glass; an additional 150 kg of armour was strategically distributed around the cockpit to protect its occupant(s). Dependent upon the variant, the cockpit contained a single pilot and a radio/radar operator, the latter just aft of the former. Fuel was housed in a pair of fuselage tanks, one was located directly aft of the primary wing spar while the other was just behind the auxiliary spar.

By 14 October 1942, the basic calculations were complete; layout drawings were completed five days later. The RLM warmly received Focke-Wulf's proposal and promptly issued a general development contract. It was at this stage that the Ta 154 designation was applied to the aircraft; unofficially, it was named Moskito in reference to its similarity to the de Havilland Mosquito fast bombers (which was also largely made of wood) already in service with the Royal Air Force (RAF). Around this time, the de Havilland Mosquito, was conducting missions upon Germany itself and was quickly building up an impressive record; in its first 600 bombing missions, only one was shot down, compared to an average of five per cent for the RAF's medium and heavy bombers. Erhard Milch personally requested a purpose-built German answer, and selected the Ta 154. Infighting within German circles started almost immediately, because the RLM and night fighter units — as well as Ernst Heinkel himself — still wanted the Heinkel He 219. Milch took this personally, and spent the better part of the next two years trying to have the He 219 program terminated, partly against Ernst Heinkel's wishes.

During the aircraft's development, it became apparent that the most suitable engine to power the Ta 154 was the more powerful Jumo 213, and that Junkers could not deliver the originally-desired Jumo 211R engine on schedule due to technical and production difficulties.

=== Into flight and production issues ===
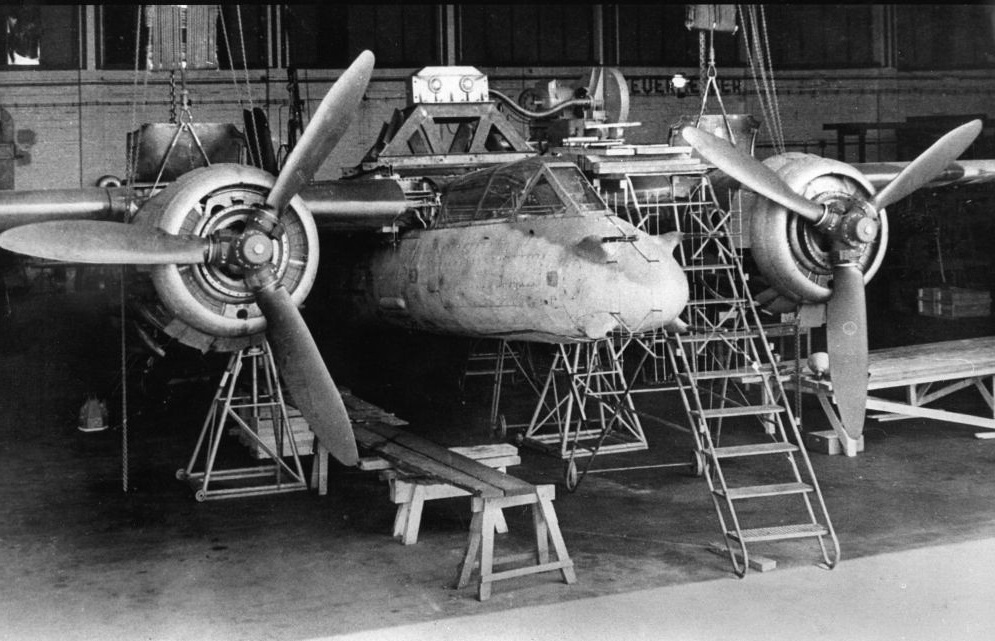
Focke-Wulf Ta 154 V2

On 1 July 1943, the prototype Ta 154 V1, which was outfitted with Jumo 211F engines and bore the Stammkennzeichen identification code TE+FE, performed its maiden flight in the hands of Kurt Tank. It was followed by V2 with Jumo 211N engines, which was kept at the factory for handling trials. V1 was later dispatched to Rechlin-Lärz Airfield to conduct fly-off testing against the competing He 219A as well as the new Junkers Ju 388. Reportedly, the aircraft reached almost 700 km/h (440 mph) and easily outflew the other two aircraft, but those were both fully armed and equipped with radar apparatus. In comparison, neither V1 or V2 were fitted with radar at this stage.

On 23 November 1943, the V3 prototype, which was also the first to be powered by the Jumo 211R engines and carry radar apparatus, made its first flight. The added weight of the guns and drag of the 32-dipole element Matratze radar antennas used on its UHF-band FuG 212 C-1 Lichtenstein radar unit slowed the aircraft by a full 75 km/h, although it was still somewhat faster than the He 219. The rest of the 15 prototypes were then delivered as A-0 models, identical to the V3. Some of these also included a raised canopy for better vision to the rear.

During March 1944, the Jägerstab decreed that Focke-Wulf should produce 37 Ta 154s by May 1944; in combination with other manufacturing assets, the production rate was somewhat unrealistically expected to reach 250 aircraft per month by November 1944. This schedule came in advance of the completion of the first eight pre-production aircraft, designated Ta 154A-0, which occurred in August of that year. These were briefly trialled by the service test unit before returning to development work. Transportation issues, which prevented subcontractors from delivering components, were highly damaging to the company's efforts to ramp up production; at one point, each airframe was reportedly taking 12,000 man-hours to produce. By June 1944, the Jumo 213 was finally arriving in some numbers, permitting the completion of several Ta 154 A-1s with these engines.

However, the Ta 154 received a fatal blow when the only factory that produced Tego-Film, in Wuppertal, was bombed out by the RAF, and the plywood glue had to be replaced by an alternative. While determined efforts were made towards this end, the new bonding agents proved to be neither as strong and even weakened the wood due to it containing too much acid and thus being corrosive. In July 1944, several Ta 154 A-1s reportedly disintegrated during high speed flight, allegedly due to the delamination and failure of the plywood wing. This same problem also critically affected the Heinkel He 162 Spatz, Ernst Heinkel's "Volksjäger" jet fighter program entry; the issue with the bonding agent was eventually resolved on this programme however.

Accordingly, production came to a halt in August 1944. One month later, the RLM officially cancelled the Ta 154, by which point Milch had been removed from his position and thus could no longer protect the programme. It is believed that about 10 production aircraft had been completed, 2 at Erfurt and 10 at Posen) and a number of the A-0 preproduction aircraft were later modified to production standard. An unknown number of the aircraft served with Nachtjagdgeschwader 3 (Night Fighter Wing 3), and a few were later used as training aircraft for jet pilots.

== Mistel/Pulkzerstörer variants ==
The designation Ta 154A-2/U3 was given to six unfinished 154A-1 airframes completed and converted into Pulkzerstörer (Formation Destroyer) aircraft. At least three Pulkzerstörer and Mistel parasite fighter schemes were mooted for the Ta 154. The only one of the three that was actually brought to operational readiness (Ta 154A-2/U3) was a system whereby the entire forward fuselage ahead of the fuel tanks was filled with Amatol high explosive. A new and extremely small cockpit for the pilot was added to the airframe directly ahead of the tailfin. From this cramped cabin, the pilot would fly the 'Bomb Moskito ' into an Allied bomber formation, arm the onboard charges and quickly bail out. A timer would then detonate the explosives a few seconds later. Fragmentation charges in the warhead would maximize the effective area of destruction.

It was hoped that this flying bomb system would tear large holes in the Anglo-American bomber streams at little cost to the Luftwaffe in terms of pilot casualties. The six Ta 154A-2/U3 'Bomb Moskitos' were completed at the Focke-Wulf plant near Poznań shortly before the occupation of the area by the Red Army, but were not used in combat. Their ultimate fate is unknown, though it is likely they were destroyed by the plant's staff to prevent them being captured. One Ta 154 Mistel scheme, reportedly designated Mistel 7, envisaged a Focke-Wulf Fw 190 'mother aircraft' mounted on struts above an unmanned Bomb Moskito. Takeoff would be effected via a sturdy three-wheeled trolley of the same type designed for the abandoned A-series of the Arado Ar 234 jet reconnaissance bomber. The trolley would be jettisoned after takeoff, leaving the Mistel Moskito to fly to its target with all three engines running. The combination would formate above an Allied bomber stream before the 190 pilot released the Bomb Moskito, which would then hopefully crash straight into a bomber with massively destructive effect. A related scheme would see a standard Ta 154 towing a Bomb Moskito behind it into the middle of a bomber stream, whereupon release and detonation would be initiated by the manned Ta 154's pilot.

== Specifications (Ta 154 A-1) ==
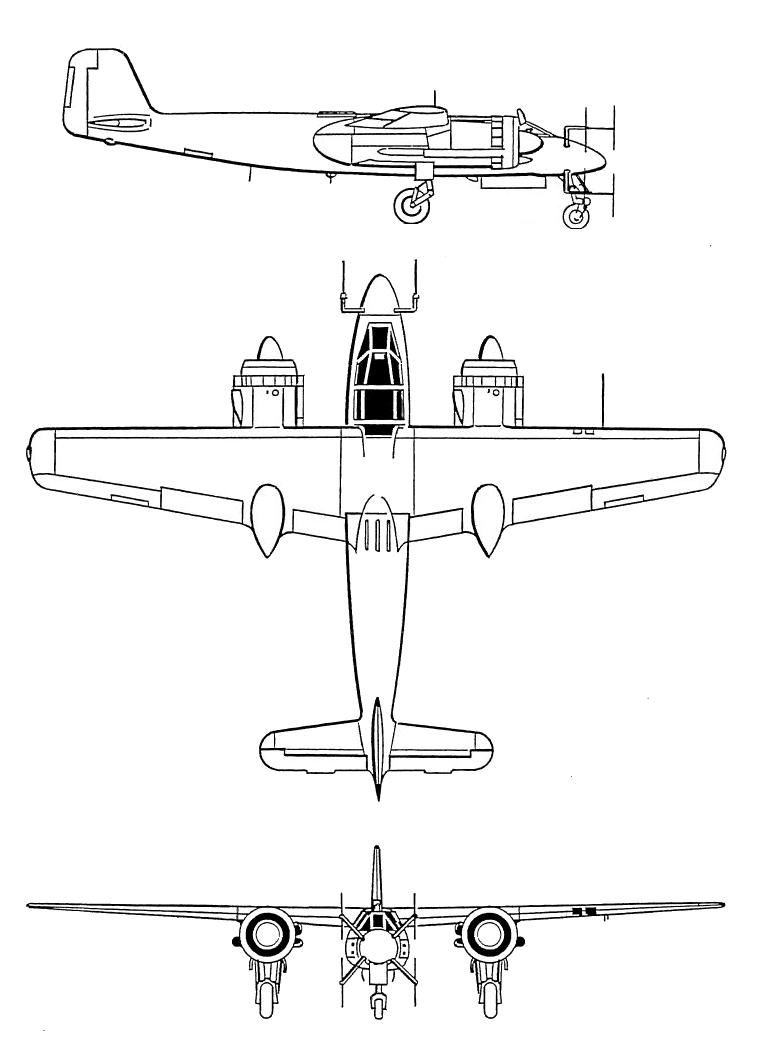

Data from Aircraft of the Third Reich. Volume One

General characteristics

- Crew: two
- Length: 12.45 m (40 ft 10 in) (without radar antennae)
- Wingspan: 16 m (52 ft 6 in)
- Height: 3.5 m (11 ft 6 in)
- Wing area: 32.4 m^{2} (349 sq ft)
- Empty weight: 6,600 kg (14,551 lb)
- Gross weight: 8,930 kg (19,687 lb)
- Max takeoff weight: 9,550 kg (21,054 lb)
- Fuel capacity: 1,500 L (400 US gal; 330 imp gal) in two fuselage tanks
- Powerplant: 2 × Junkers Jumo 213E V-12 inverted liquid-cooled piston engines, 1,305 kW (1,750 hp) each for take-off

984 kW (1,320 hp) at 10,000 m (33,000 ft)

- Propellers: 3-bladed Junkers VS-9 wooden constant-speed propellers

Performance

- Maximum speed: 650 km/h (400 mph, 350 kn) at 7,090 m (23,260 ft)

534 km/h (332 mph; 288 kn) at sea level

- Range: 1,365 km (848 mi, 737 nmi) at 7,000 m (23,000 ft)

1,860 km (1,160 mi; 1,000 nmi) with two 300 L (79 US gal; 66 imp gal)

- Service ceiling: 10,900 m (35,800 ft)
- Rate of climb: 15 m/s (3,000 ft/min)
- Time to altitude: 8,000 m (26,000 ft) in 14 minutes and 30 seconds

Armament

- Guns: * 2 × 20 mm (0.787 in) MG 151/20 cannon 200 rpg.
- 2 × 30 mm (1.181 in) nose-mounted MK 108 cannon 110 rpg.
- (Ta 154C) + 2 × fuselage-mounted Schräge Musik 30 mm (1.181 in) MK 108 cannon

Avionics
variously:-

- FuG 218 Neptun radar
- FuG 212 Lichtenstein C-1
- FuG 220 Lichtenstein SN-2
- FuG 350 Naxos Z radar detector (to home in on H_{2}S radar)
- Revi 16B gunsight

== See also ==
Related development

- Focke-Wulf Ta 254

Aircraft of comparable role, configuration, and era

- de Havilland Mosquito
- Grumman F7F Tigercat
- Heinkel He 219 Uhu
- Mitsubishi Ki-83
- Nakajima J5N Tenrai

Related lists

- List of World War II military aircraft of Germany
- List of military aircraft of Germany
- List of WW2 Luftwaffe aircraft prototype projects
