= Fieseler Fi 157 =

Unsuccessful anti-aircraft target

Fi 157
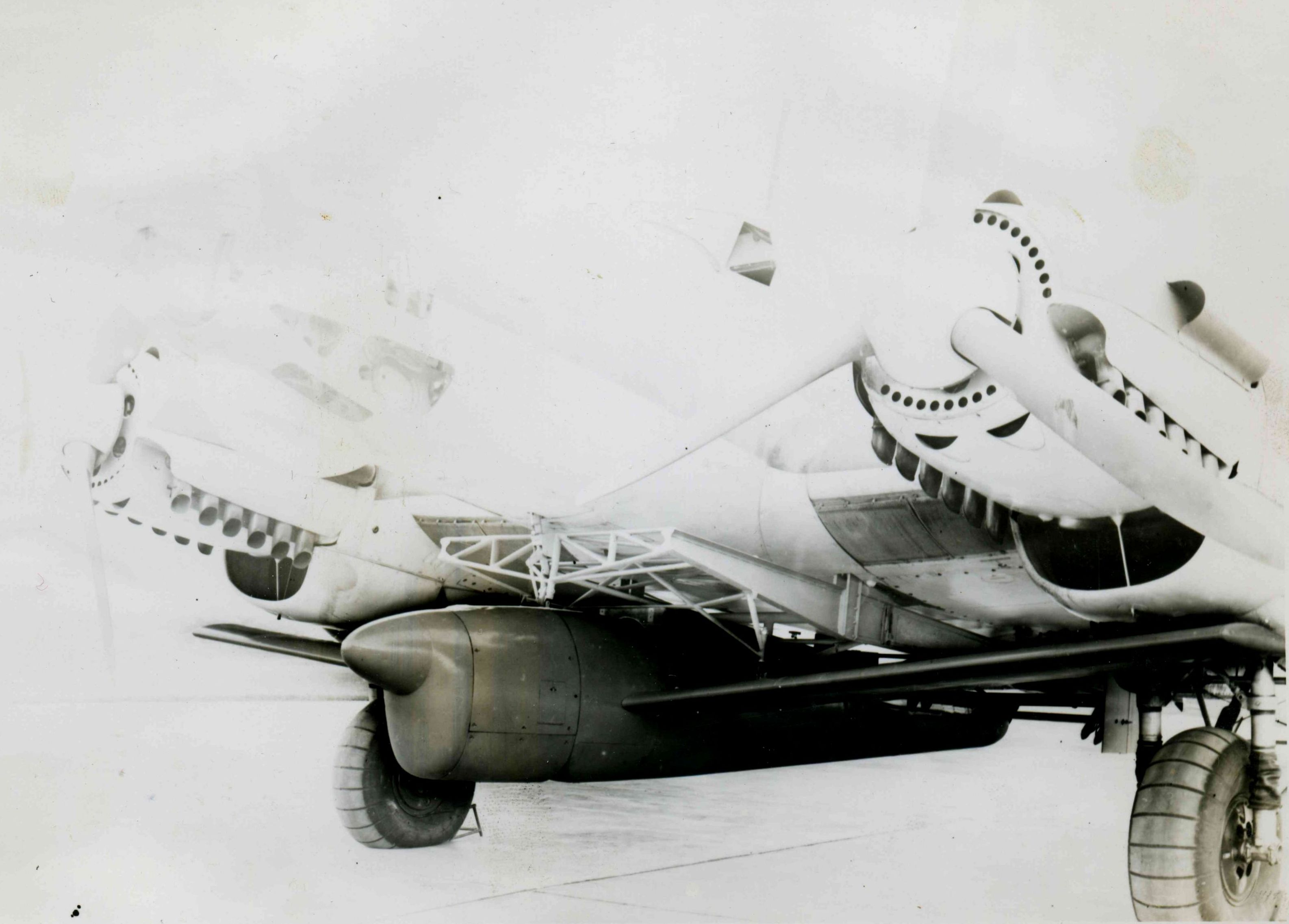
- An un-powered Fi 157 ready for drop trials from its He 111B mother-ship.

General information
- Type: Unmanned anti-aircraft target drone
- Manufacturer: Fieseler
- Number built: 3

History
- First flight: 1937

The Fieseler Fi 157 was an unsuccessful attempt at developing a radio-controlled, full-sized anti-aircraft target.

== Design and development ==
In 1937, the Reichsluftfahrtministerium (RLM) contracted Fieseler to produce a radio controlled anti-aircraft target drone. The resulting Fi 157 was a low-wing monoplane of entirely wooden construction and was carried beneath a bomber before being released. All three prototypes crashed during testing; a single example of a manned version, designated Fi 158, was built to investigate remote guidance.

== Specifications (Fieseler Fi 157) ==
Data from

General characteristics

- Length: 5.86 m (19 ft 3 in)
- Wingspan: 6.5 m (21 ft 4 in)
- Wing area: 5.9 m^{2} (64 sq ft)
- Empty weight: 226 kg (498 lb)
- Gross weight: 309 kg (681 lb)
- Powerplant: 1 × Hirth Motoren HM 60 4-cyl. inverted air-cooled in-line piston engine, 119 kW (160 hp)

Performance

- Maximum speed: 293 km/h (182 mph, 158 kn)
- Range: 580 km (360 mi, 310 nmi)

== See also ==
Related development

- Fieseler Fi 158
