= Fieseler Fi 98 =

Prototype aircraft by Fieseler

Fi 98
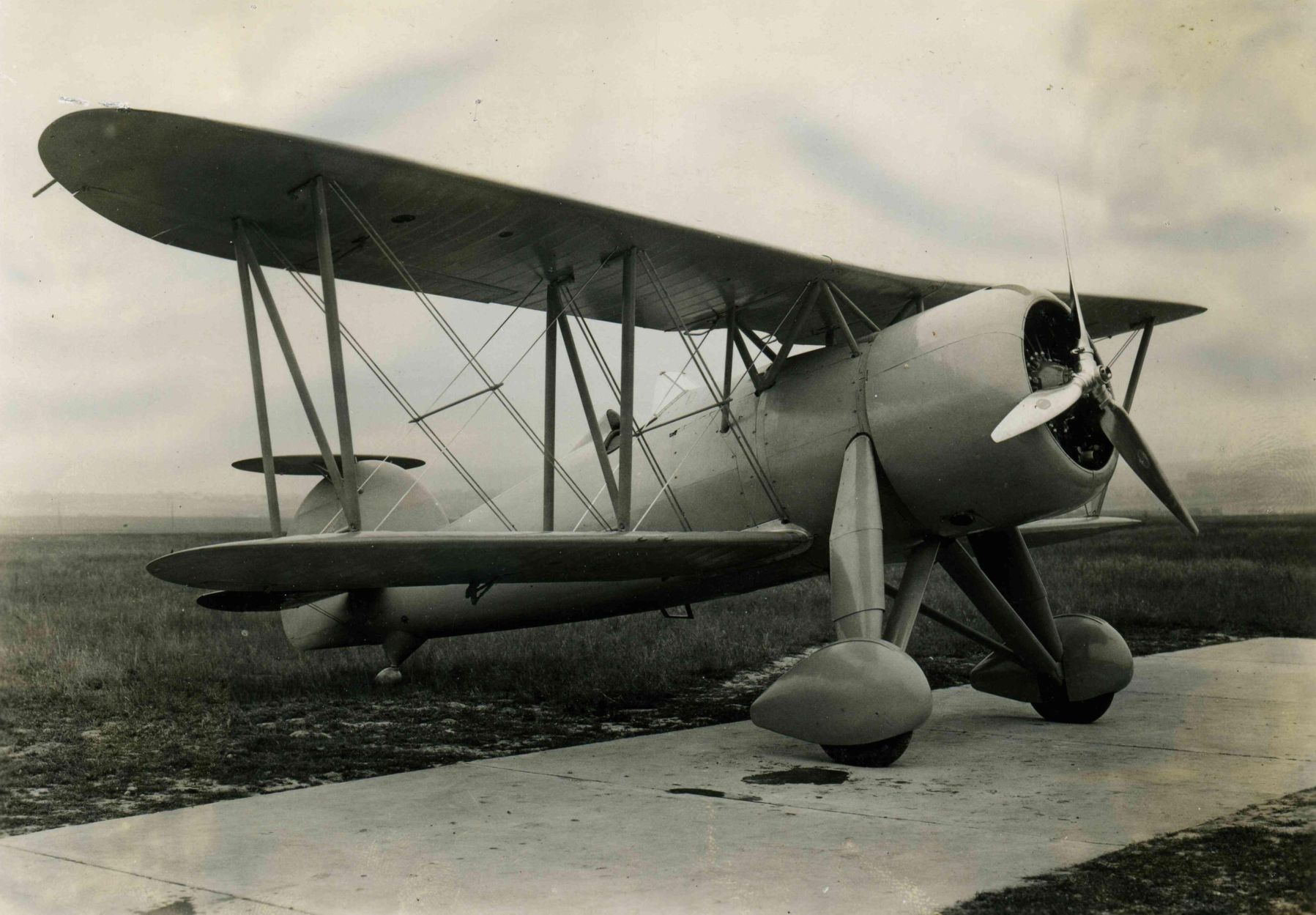

General information
- Type: Dive bomber ground-attack aircraft
- National origin: Germany
- Manufacturer: Fieseler
- Status: Prototype only
- Number built: 1

History
- First flight: 1935

The Fieseler Fi 98 was a prototype ground-attack aircraft produced by German aircraft manufacturer Fieseler as a rival to the Henschel Hs 123.

== Design and development ==
Fieseler developed the model in response to the Reich Air Ministry specification of 11 February 1934 calling for a robust biplane for low-level attack and dive bombing.

Three prototypes were ordered, of which one prototype was completed, and the design was rejected in favour of the Hs 123. The design of the model, a braced-wing biplane, was essentially obsolescent.

== Specifications (Fi 98) ==
Data from The warplanes of the Third Reich, Luftwaffe secret projects : ground attack & special purpose aircraft

General characteristics

- Crew: 1
- Length: 7.4 m (24 ft 3 in)
- Wingspan: 11.5 m (37 ft 9 in)
- Height: 3 m (9 ft 10 in)
- Wing area: 24.51 m^{2} (263.8 sq ft)
- Empty weight: 1,453 kg (3,203 lb)
- Gross weight: 2,165 kg (4,773 lb)
- Powerplant: 1 × BMW 132A-2 9-cylinder air-cooled radial engine, 485 kW (650 hp)
- Propellers: 3-bladed variable-pitch propeller

Performance

- Maximum speed: 295 km/h (183 mph, 159 kn) at 2,000 m (6,600 ft)
- Cruise speed: 270 km/h (170 mph, 150 kn)
- Range: 470 km (290 mi, 250 nmi)
- Service ceiling: 9,000 m (30,000 ft)
- Time to altitude: 1,000 m (3,300 ft) in 1 minute 7 seconds

Armament

- Guns: 2 x fixed forward-firing 7.92 mm (0 in) MG 17 machine guns
- Bombs: 4 x 50 kg (110 lb) bombs

== See also ==
Aircraft of comparable role, configuration, and era

- Henschel Hs 123

Related lists

- List of military aircraft of Germany
