= Henschel Hs 123 =

1935 dive bomber series by Henschel

Hs 123
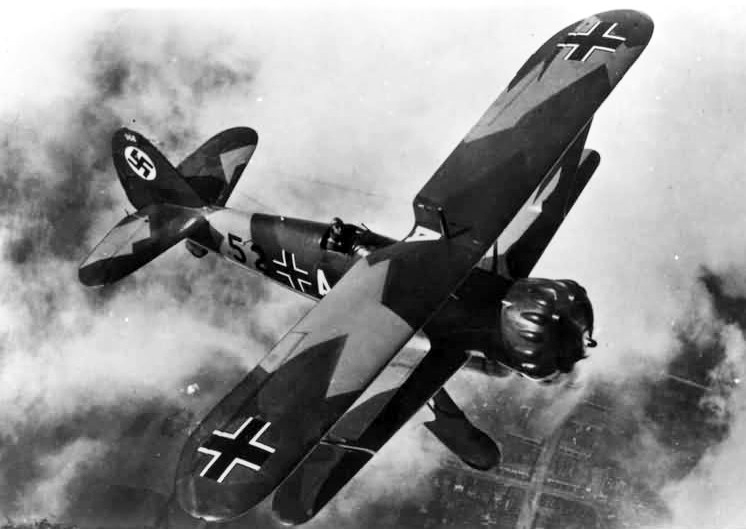

General information
- Type: Dive bomber
- National origin: Nazi Germany
- Manufacturer: Henschel
- Status: Retired
- Primary users: Luftwaffe Republic of China Air Force
- Number built: 265

History
- Introduction date: 1936
- First flight: 8 May 1935
- Retired: 1953 (Spanish Air Force)

The Henschel Hs 123 was a single-seat biplane dive bomber and close-support aircraft designed by the German aircraft manufacturer Henschel. It was the last biplane to be operated by the Luftwaffe.

The Hs 123 started development in 1933 in response to a request for a single-seat biplane dive bomber. Henschel's design team opted to produce an aircraft with all-metal construction, relatively clean lines and a high level of manoeuvrability. Its principal competitor was the Fieseler Fi 98, which was eventually cancelled when the Hs 123 proved to be more promising. On 1 April 1935, the first prototype performed its maiden flight; four prototypes were produced, the fourth of which featured strengthened centre-section struts after two of the earlier prototypes were lost due to structural failures during high speed dives.

On its introduction to the Luftwaffe in the autumn of 1936, the Hs 123 quickly displaced the Heinkel He 50 biplane, but was viewed as a "stop-gap" until the arrival of the Junkers Ju 87 Stuka. In 1938, the type was dispatched to Spain to fight with the Legion Condor in the Spanish Civil War; the type reportedly performed well, particularly in the psychological impact of its attacks upon the Republicans. The Spanish Nationalists were impressed with the type and opted to procure additional aircraft. The temporarily organized 15th Squadron of the China Central Air Force Academy Group also flew combat missions with its Hs 123s around this time, attacking Imperial Japanese warships along the Yangtze River.

The Luftwaffe opted to dispatch the type during the early and middle portions of the Second World War, first deploying it during the Polish Campaign. In 1940, it saw action in the invasions of the Netherlands, Belgium and France in the Battle of France and the early part of the Balkans Campaign. Numerous Hs 123s saw combat during the start of Operation Barbarossa (the invasion of the Soviet Union) in 1941. The Hs 123 proved to be relatively robust, durable and effective in combat, especially in severe conditions (such as those present in the Eastern Front).It was commonly modified in the field to carry additional machine guns, more armour and other changes. It continued to see front-line service until 1944, only to be withdrawn due to a lack of serviceable airframes and spare parts (production ended in the autumn of 1938).

== Design and development ==
Henschel was a German locomotive manufacturer. Soon after Hitler's rise to power, Henschel decided to start designing aircraft, one of the first being the Hs 123. This aircraft was designed to satisfy the requirement issued in 1933 by the Reichsluftfahrtministerium (RLM). This requirement sought a new dive bomber to equip the new Luftwaffe; it was specified that this aircraft should be a single-seat biplane. Henschel and rival firm Fieseler, who responded with the Fi 98, competed for the same requirement.

In comparison to the Fi 98, the Hs 123 was noticeably more streamlined and possessed relatively clean lines. It was a sesquiplane, whereby the lower wings were significantly smaller than the top wings. The aircraft featured all-metal construction, the fuselage and fixed tail surfaces had a light alloy covering while most of the wings were also metal skinned; the control surfaces and the rear portion of both wings had a fabric covering. The design eliminated the use of bracing wires, instead relying on single faired interplane struts. The Hs 123 was also outfitted with cantilever main landing gear legs that were attached directly to the smaller stub-like lower wings.

On 1 April 1935, the first prototype, the Hs 123 V1, performed its maiden flight. During its first public demonstration flight, on 8 May 1935, it was piloted by Generalluftzeugmeister Ernst Udet, a First World War ace. The first three Henschel prototypes, the first and third of which were powered by 485 kW (650 hp) BMW 132A-3 engines while the second by a 574 kW (770 hp) Wright Cyclone, were tested at Rechlin in August 1935. Only the first prototype had "smooth" cowlings; the rest had a tightly fitted cowling that included 18 fairings covering the engine valves. The third prototype was the first to carry armament.

The performance of the Hs 123 V1 prototype was such that it quickly eliminated any prospect for the more conventional Fi 98 being awarded the contract; further work was promptly cancelled after a sole prototype had been constructed. During flight testing, the Hs 123 proved to be capable of pulling out of "near-vertical" dives but two of the first three prototypes crashed due to structural failures in the wings during high-speed dives. The fourth prototype incorporated improvements to rectify these problems, the principal change being the adoption of sturdier centre-section struts.

Following the completion its tests, the Hs 123 was ordered into production with a 656 kW (880 hp) BMW 132Dc engine. During the summer of 1936, the first production aircraft came off the assembly lines, that had been established at Henschel's Schönefeld and Johannisthal facilities. The Hs 123 was intended to replace the Heinkel He 50 biplane reconnaissance and dive bomber as well as to function as a stop-gap until the Junkers Ju 87 Stuka became available; production was limited and no upgrades were seriously considered.

Henschel opted to work on an improved version, the Hs 123B, during 1938. A proposal to fit the aircraft with a more powerful 716 kW (960 hp) "K"-variant of its BMW 132 engine did not proceed beyond the prototype stage, the Hs 123 V5. The V6 prototype fitted with a similar engine and featuring a sliding cockpit hood was intended to serve as the Hs 123C prototype; 265 aircraft are believed to have been produced. Production of the Hs 123A was terminated in the autumn of 1938. A prototype Hs 123B and a prototype Hs 123C were produced just prior to production of the Hs 123A ended.

The majority of Hs 123s were delivered to the Luftwaffe and twelve Hs 123s were exported to China and 14 were transferred to the Spanish Aviación Nacional (the Nationalist Air Arm); both operators would use their aircraft in combat.

== Operational history ==
=== Initial operations ===
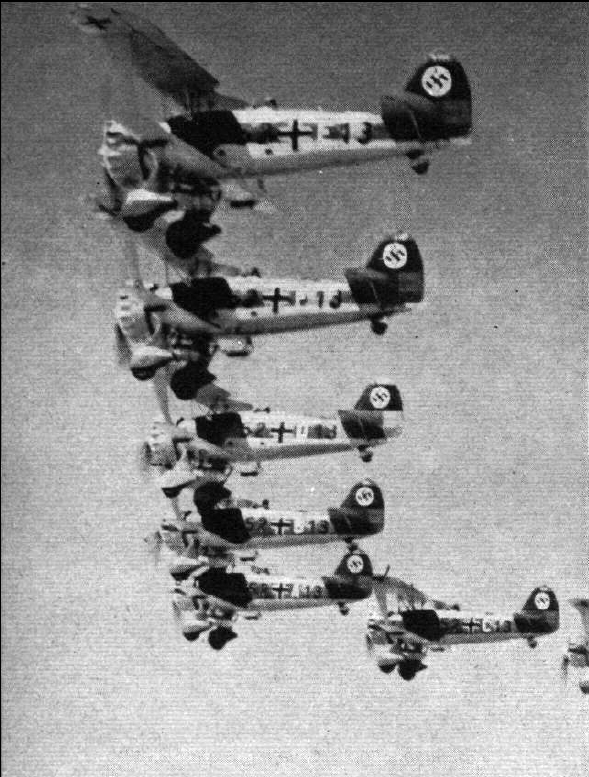
A squadron of Luftwaffe Henschel Hs 123As in flight before the Second World War

During 1936, a small pre-production batch of Hs 123A-0s was completed and used for service evaluation by the Luftwaffe. This initial group was followed by the slightly modified Hs 123A-1 series, the first production examples. The service aircraft flew with an armoured headrest and fairing in place (a canopy was tested in the Hs 123V6) as well as removable main wheel spats and a faired tailwheel. The main weapon load of four SC50 50 kg (110 lb) bombs could be carried in lower wing racks along with an additional SC250 250 kg (550 lb) bomb mounted on a "crutch" beneath the fuselage. The usual configuration was to install an auxiliary fuel "drop" tank at this station that was jettisoned in emergencies. Two 7.92 mm (.312 in) MG 17 machine guns were mounted in the nose synchronized to fire through the propeller arc.

The aircraft entered service at StG 162 in autumn 1936. Its career as a dive bomber was cut short when the unit received its first Ju 87A during the following year. The remaining Hs 123s were incorporated into the temporary Fliegergeschwader 100 at the time of the Munich Crisis. The Geschwader (wing) had been created as an emergency measure, equipped with obsolete aircraft and tasked with the ground attack role. With the signing of the Munich Agreement on 30 September 1938, the crisis was over and the Geschwader was disbanded, the gruppen being transferred to other established units. By 1939, despite its success in Spain, the Luftwaffe considered the Hs 123 to be obsolete and the schlachtgeschwader (close-support wings) had been disbanded with only one gruppe, II.(Schl)/LG 2 still equipped with the Hs 123.

=== Spanish Civil War ===
During the same time, at the request of Oberst (later Generalfeldmarschall) Wolfram von Richthofen, chief of staff of the Legion Condor, five aircraft had been deployed to Spain in early 1937 as a part of the Legion Condor, intended to be used as tactical bombers.

In their intended role, the Hs 123s proved to be somewhat of a failure, hampered by their small bomb capacity and short range. Instead, the Hs 123s based in Seville were used for ground support, a role in which their range was not such a detriment, and where the ability to accurately place munitions was more important than carrying a large load. The combat evaluation of the Hs 123 demonstrated a remarkable resiliency in close-support missions, proving able to absorb a great deal of punishment including direct hits on the airframe and engine. The Nationalists in Spain were impressed with the Hs 123's performance in battle, purchasing the entire evaluation flight and ordering an additional 11 aircraft from Germany. The Spanish Hs 123s were known as "Angelito" (dear angel or little angel), and at least one Hs 123 was in service with the Ejército del Aire (Spanish Air Force) after 1945.

=== Second Sino-Japanese War ===
Twelve Hs 123s that were originally ordered by Portugal were exported to China. They were extensively used as dive bombers by the temporarily organized 15th Squadron of the China Central Air Force Academy Group, operating against Imperial Japanese warships along the Yangtze River, especially during 1938.

=== Second World War ===
==== Service from Poland to Greece ====
At the outbreak of hostilities, the surviving 39 Hs 123s assigned to II. (Schl)/LG 2, were committed to action during the Polish Campaign. This single unit proved to be particularly effective. Screaming over the heads of enemy troops, the Hs 123s delivered their bombs with devastating accuracy. A frightening aspect of an Hs 123 attack was the staccato noise of its engine that a pilot could manipulate by changing rpm to create "gunfire-like" bursts. The Hs 123 proved to be quite rugged and capable of absorbing a high amount of damage while continuing to fly. Operating from primitive bases close to the front lines, the type was considered by ground crews to be easy to maintain and reliable in field conditions.

The Polish campaign was a success for the Hs 123 in spite of it being considered obsolete by several figures within Luftwaffe high command. Within a year, the Hs 123 was again in action in the blitzkrieg attacks through the Netherlands, Belgium and France. During one noteworthy engagement on 22 May 1940, the two gruppen equipped with the type held off an attacking force of around 40 tanks against their own forward base in Cambrai.

General Heinz Guderian was continually impressed by the quick turnaround time offered by II.(Schl)/LG 2. Often positioned as the Luftwaffe's most-forward based combat unit, the Hs 123 flew more missions per day than other units, and proved their worth in the close-support role. With Ju 87s still being used as tactical bombers rather than ground support aircraft, and with no other aircraft capable of this mission in the Luftwaffe arsenal, the Hs 123 was to continue in service, although numbers were constantly being reduced by attrition. While the Hs 123 proved to be particularly resilient against ground attacks, they were vulnerable to enemy fighter interception.

The Hs 123 was not employed in the subsequent Battle of Britain as the English Channel proved an insuperable obstacle for the short-ranged aircraft. The sole operator, II.(Schl)/LG 2 went back to Germany to re-equip with the Messerschmitt Bf 109E fighter bomber (Jabo) variant. The Bf 109E fighter bomber was not capable of carrying any more bombs than the Hs 123, however, it did have a greater range and was far more capable of defending itself. It did have some downsides, including the notoriously tricky taxiing, ground handling, and takeoff/landing characteristics of the Bf 109, which were exacerbated with a bomb load.

At the beginning of the Balkans Campaign, the 32 examples of the Hs 123 that had been retired after the fall of France were taken back into service to equip 10.(Schl)/LG 2. The aircraft performed well enough to warrant its continued use by the Luftwaffe.

==== Eastern Front service ====
Henschel Hs 123 on the Eastern Front

At the start of Operation Barbarossa, the single Gruppe of the Luftwaffe that was dedicated to ground support was II.(Schl)/LG 2, operating 22 Hs 123s (along with 38 Bf 109Es). In service use on the Eastern Front, the remaining aircraft had been field-modified with the main wheel spats removed, additional armour and extra equipment fitted as well as mounting extra machine guns and even cannons in under-wing housings.

Some volunteers of Escuadrilla Azul (15 Spanische Staffel/VIII. Fliegerkorps) of JG-27 detached in Luftflotte 2 managed Hs 123s in collaboration of II.(Schl.)/LG 2 units for ground strikes along Bf 109E-7/B fighter-bombers during 1941–42 period.

During the initial drive, the unit participated in action along the central and northern parts of the front, including a brief time in support of the fighting around Leningrad, and participating in the battles for Bryansk and Vyazma. The first weeks revealed problems associated with using the Bf 109E, which was plagued by undercarriage and engine problems in the fighter-bomber role. Furthermore, its liquid-cooled inline engine was more vulnerable to small arms fire than the Hs 123's radial.

The winter of 1941/1942 brought hardship to all German forces in Russia, and the pilots in the open cockpits of the Henschels suffered accordingly. Despite this, they took part in the Battle of Moscow. In January 1942, the unit was re-designated as the first dedicated ground attack wing (in German Schlachtgeschwader 1, SchlG 1). The Hs 123 became a part of 7./SchlG 1.

During May 1942, this "new" unit participated in operations in Crimea, after which it operated on the southern sector for some time, participating in the Second Battle of Kharkov and going on to take part in the Battle of Stalingrad. In the meantime, the small number of operational Hs 123 continued to slowly dwindle. Aircraft had been salvaged from training schools and even derelict dumps all over Germany to replace losses. The aircraft that had supposedly replaced the Hs 123, the Ju 87, also started to be assigned to ground support units, leaving tactical bombing to newer aircraft.

The greatest tribute to the Hs 123 usefulness came in January 1943 when Generaloberst Wolfram von Richthofen, then commander-in-chief of Luftflotte 4, asked whether production of the Hs 123 could be restarted because the Hs 123 performed well in a theatre where mud, snow, rain and ice took a heavy toll on the serviceability of more advanced aircraft. However, the Henschel factory had already dismantled all tools and jigs in 1940.

After participating in the Battle of Kursk, SG 1 returned to Crimea, and there during late spring 1944, they finally gave up the aircraft that had served all over Europe from Spain to Leningrad. 7./SG 1 traded its last Hs 123s in mid-1944, for Ju 87s, a type that was to have replaced it back in 1937.

By 1945, the Hs 123s that remained serviceable were reassigned to secondary duties such as supply dropping and glider towing.

== Legacy ==
The Henschel Hs 123 showed that a slow but rugged and reliable aircraft could be effective in ground attack. Despite its antiquated appearance, the Hs 123 proved useful in every theatre of the Second World War in which it fought.

No Hs 123s are known to have survived.

=== Follow-on designs ===
The success of the Hs 123 in the Spanish Civil War led the RLM to put out a request for a successor aircraft. At this point in history, the exact role of aircraft in support of the army was still being developed. This was perhaps the first dedicated attack aircraft design which was intended to fulfill the close air support role in the niche between the tactical bomber and the dive bomber. The successor chosen was the Henschel Hs 129.

== Operators ==
(Taiwan) Republic of China

- Republic of China Air Force – operated 12 aircraft using them as dive bombers.

Nazi Germany

- Luftwaffe

(Francoist Spain) Spanish State

- Spanish Air Force – purchased the Condor Legion's remaining aircraft, and ordered an additional 11 aircraft from Germany. On the Eastern Front, volunteers of Escuadrilla Azul (15 Spanische Staffel/VIII Fliegerkorps) of JG 27 based in Vitebsk operated Hs 123's alongside II.(Schl.)/LG 2 units.

== Specifications (Hs 123A-1) ==
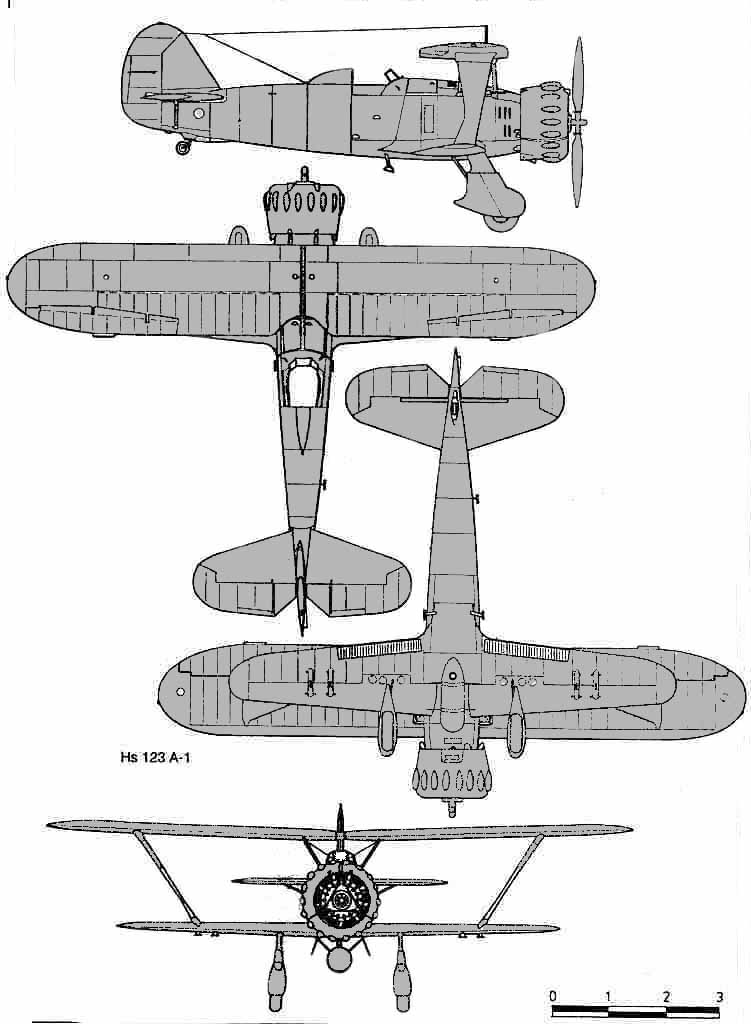
Hs 123A-1

Data from Aircraft of World War II: The Aviation Factfile

General characteristics

- Crew: 1
- Length: 8.33 m (27 ft 4 in)
- Wingspan: 10.5 m (34 ft 5 in)
- Height: 3.2 m (10 ft 6 in)
- Wing area: 24.85 m^{2} (267.5 sq ft)
- Empty weight: 1,500 kg (3,307 lb)
- Gross weight: 2,215 kg (4,883 lb)
- Powerplant: 1 × BMW 132Dc nine-cylinder air-cooled radial piston engine, 660 kW (880 hp)
- Propellers: 2-bladed metal variable-pitch propeller

Performance

- Maximum speed: 341 km/h (212 mph, 184 kn) at 1,200 m (3,900 ft)
- Range: 860 km (530 mi, 460 nmi) with drop tank
- Combat range: 480 km (300 mi, 260 nmi) with 200 kg (440 lb) of bombs
- Service ceiling: 9,000 m (30,000 ft)
- Rate of climb: 15 m/s (3,000 ft/min)

Armament

- 2 × 7.92 mm MG 17 machine guns, 400 rpg (field modification of 2 × 20 mm (0.79 in) MG FF cannon)
- Up to 450 kg (992.1 lb) of bombs (1 × SC250 bomb under fuselage and 4 × SC50 bombs under wings)

== See also ==
Aircraft of comparable role, configuration, and era

- Aichi D1A
- Curtiss SBC
- Hawker Hart
- Heinkel He 50
- Mitsubishi Ki-15
- Polikarpov R-5
- Polikarpov R-Z

Related lists

- List of aircraft of World War II
- List of military aircraft of Germany
