= War of Attrition (disambiguation) =

The War of Attrition was a limited war fought between Israel and Egypt from 1967 to 1970.

- War of Attrition in the Bashan Salient, fought between Israel and Syria concerning over the Bashan Salient from March to May of 1974.

War of Attrition may also refer to:

- Attrition warfare, the military strategy of wearing down the enemy by continual losses in personnel and material
- War of attrition (game), a model of aggression in game theory, formulated by John Maynard Smith
- War of Attrition (album), a 2007 album by death metal band Dying Fetus
- War of Attrition (horse), Irish racehorse, winner of 2006 Cheltenham Gold Cup

== See also ==
- Attrition (disambiguation)
- War (disambiguation)
