= Aichi D1A =

Japanese carrier-borne dive bomber

D1A
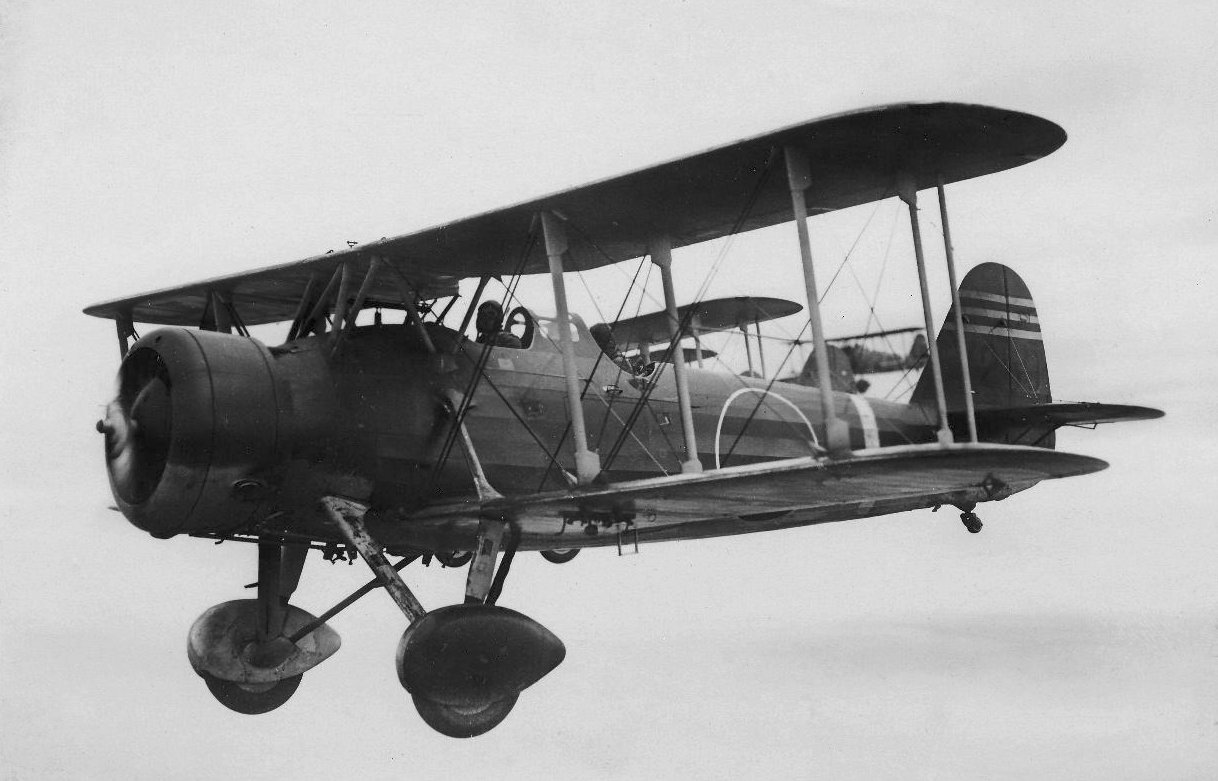

General information
- Type: Dive bomber
- National origin: Japan
- Manufacturer: Aichi Kokuki KK
- Status: Retired
- Primary user: Imperial Japanese Navy Air Service
- Number built: 590

History
- First flight: 1934
- Retired: 1942

The Aichi D1A was a carrier-based dive bomber produced by the Japanese aircraft manufacturer Aichi Kokuki. The Imperial Japanese Navy Air Service (IJNAS) designation was Navy Type 94/96 Carrier Bomber while the Allied reporting name was "Susie".

In response to an Imperial Japanese Navy (IJN) specification for a new dive bomber, Aichi obtained a He 66 and adapted it to suit the requirement. The result was a single-engine twin-seat biplane demonstrator, sometimes referred to as the Aichi Special Bomber, which performed its maiden flight in 1934. Following competitive trials, Aichi received a production contract for the type that same year. The D1A was produced in two variants, the D1A1 (Navy Type 94 Carrier Bomber), and the D1A2 (Navy Type 96 Carrier Bomber, sometimes referred to as the D2A). It was constructed primarily of metal and had a fabric covering, a fixed landing gear and a conventional fixed tailwheel.

The D1A saw action during the Second Sino-Japanese War. It was also involved in the USS Panay incident of 1937. By December 1941, when Japan entered into World War II, the type had largely been withdrawn from frontline combat roles and had been relegated to training duties alone. This was due to a combination of attrition and the availability of more capable aircraft. A small portion, totalling 68 D1A2s, continued to be operated as a second-line support until finally being retired entirely sometime in 1942.

== Design and development ==
The D1A can trace its origins back to 1933 and a number of Imperial Japanese Navy (IJN) officials had concluded that the performance of the service's existing carrier-based dive bombers was less than desired. Accordingly, several Japanese aircraft manufacturers, including Nakajima, Dai-Jūichi Kaigun Kōkū-shō and Aichi Kokuki, were instructed by the IJN to produce responses to a new specification for a dive-bomber. This speculation stipulated considerable structural strength and manoeuvrability as well as performance that exceeded that of the service's existing dive-bombers. Aichi opted to response by making use of their existing technical arrangements with the German aircraft manufacturer Ernst Heinkel Flugzeugwerke to have a single He 66 transported to Japan, where the company performed several modifications to adapt it to fulfil the specific requirements.

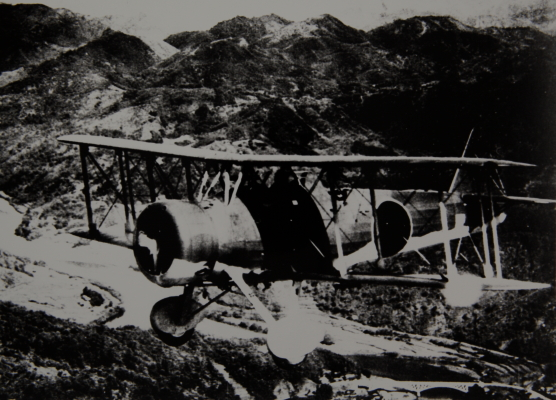
A D1A2 in flight

Specific changes made by Aichi's design team, which was headed by Tokuhishiro Goake, included the redesigning and strengthening of the undercarriage to suit carrier landings, the adoption of a locally-produced radial engine, and the addition of a second seat just aft of the pilot. Initially referred to as the Aichi Special Bomber, the modified aircraft participated in competitive fly-offs against the rival submissions, during which it demonstrated greater stability and manoeuvrability. Accordingly, in 1934, Aichi was awarded a production contract for the type as the Navy Type 94 Carrier Bomber.

Several differences between the demonstrator and subsequent production aircraft were present, which included the presence of a Townend ring around the engine cylinders, a slight sweepback of the wing, modified rudder, and the substitution of the tailskid by a fixed tailwheel. Armaments comprised two forward-firing machine guns, a single rear-facing flexibly-mounted machine gun, and the capability to carry two bombs on its underwing bomb racks and a single larger bomb underneath the fuselage. While early production models were powered by 365 kW (490 hp) engines, later models were equipped with more powerful 433 kW (580 hp) engines.

In 1935, the improved D1A2 was designed, and performed its maiden flight in late 1936. It benefitted from the more powerful Nakajima Hikari 1 engine, the fitting of spats and improved windshields. This model was produced as the Navy Type 96 Carrier Bomber.

== Operational history ==
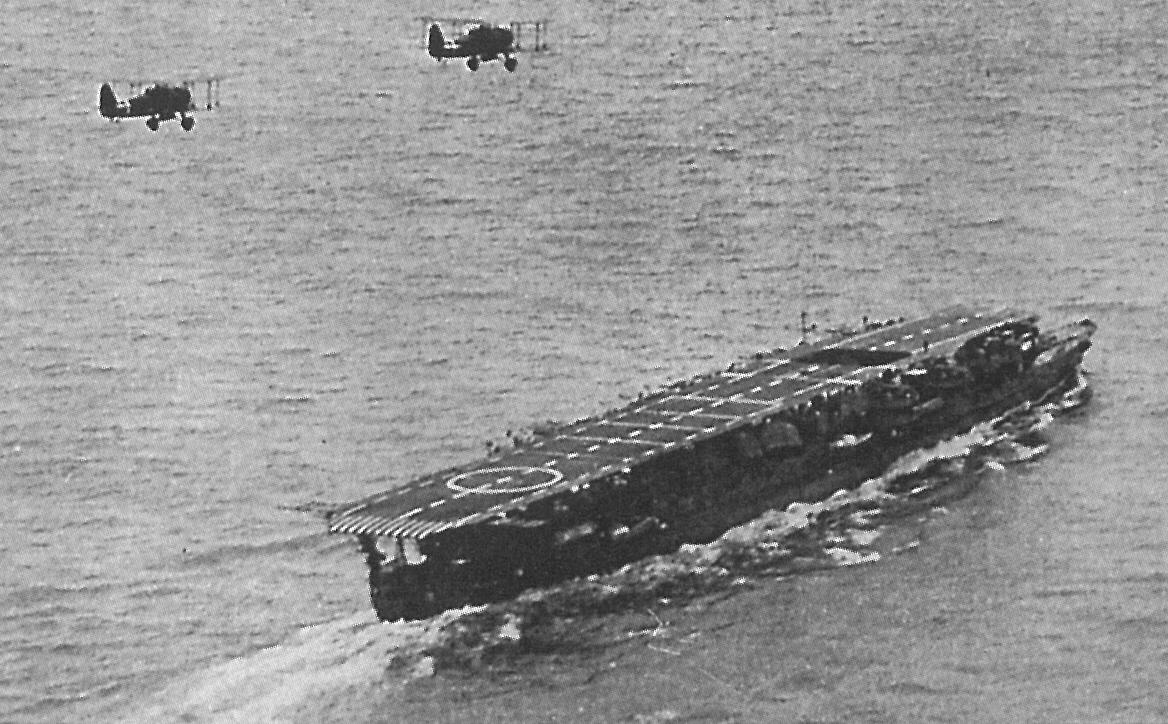
A pair of D1A2s flying over the Japanese aircraft carrier Ryūjō, circa 1938

The D1A was deployed during the Second Sino-Japanese War, being among the first aircraft to see action during the initial phase of the conflict. The D1A2 also saw extensive use throughout this conflict; in 1937, several aircraft participated in the USS Panay incident, during which a United States Navy gunboat and three tankers were sunk. The type saw use onboard multiple Japanese aircraft carriers, including Akagi, Kaga, and Ryūjō.

By the start of the Pacific War in December 1941, which brought Japan into World War II, the type had been largely withdrawn from use by the IJN in favour of newer and more capable aircraft, although a number of aircraft were still being used in a training capacity.

== Variants ==
D1A1 Type 94
Powered by 433 kW (580 hp) Nakajima Kotobuki 2 Kai 1 or Kotobuki 3 radial engines; 162 built.
D1A2 Type 96 (Sometimes referred to as the D2A)
Improved version fitted with spatted wheels and a higher powered Nakajima Hikari 1 engine; 428 built.
AB-11
Proposed development with retractable undercarriage. Not built.

== Operators ==
Empire of Japan

- Imperial Japanese Navy Air Service

Manchukuo

- Manchukuo Imperial Navy

== Specifications (D1A2) ==
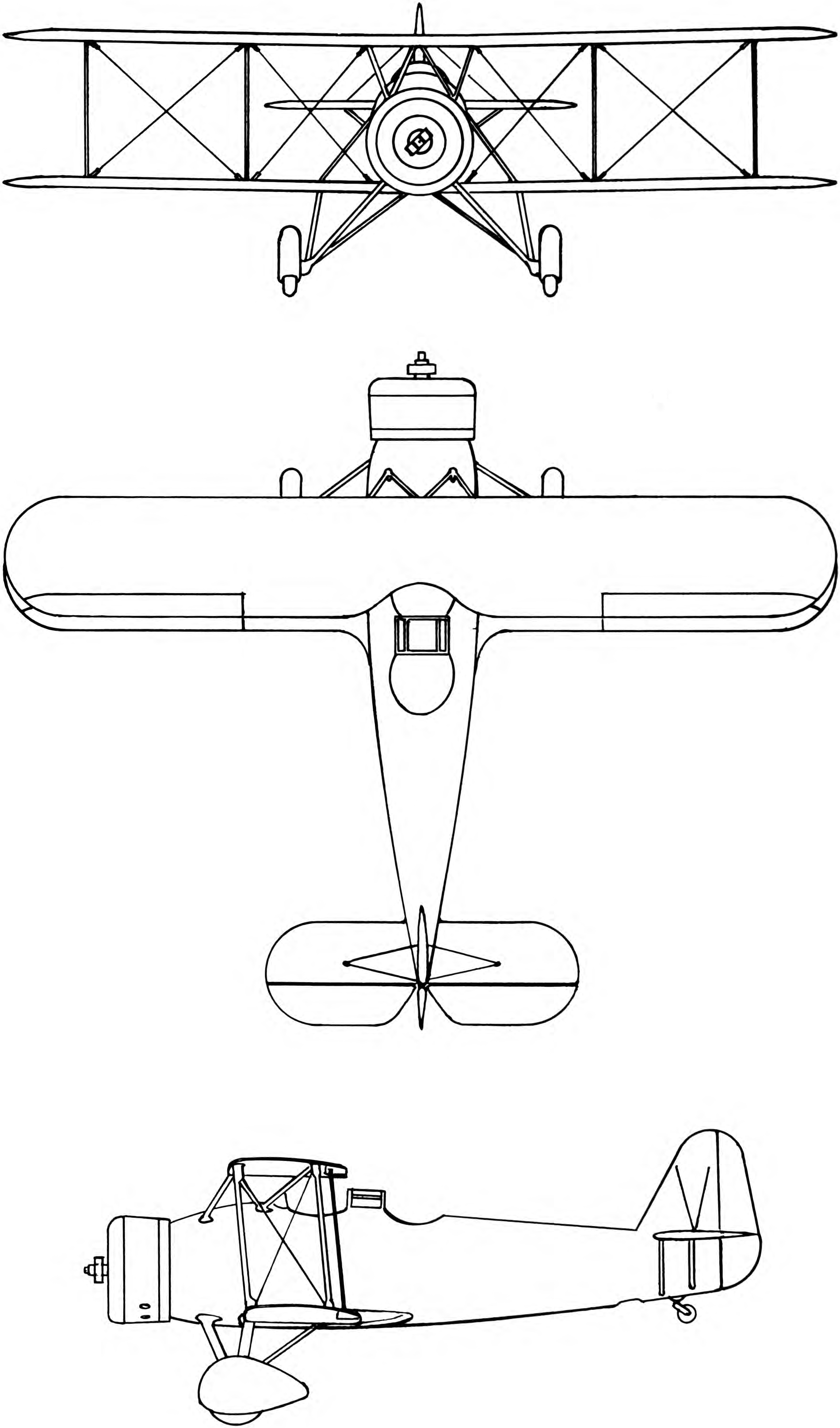
3-view drawing of the Aichi D1A

Data from Japanese Aircraft of the Pacific War Aircraft of World War II - 300 of the World's Greatest aircraft 1939-45

General characteristics

- Crew: 2
- Length: 9.3 m (30 ft 6 in)
- Wingspan: 11.4 m (37 ft 5 in)
- Height: 3.41 m (11 ft 2 in)
- Wing area: 34.7 m^{2} (374 sq ft)
- Empty weight: 1,516 kg (3,342 lb)
- Gross weight: 2,500 kg (5,512 lb)
- Max takeoff weight: 2,610 kg (5,754 lb)
- Powerplant: 1 × Nakajima Hikari 1 nine-cylinder air-cooled radial piston engine, 540 kW (730 hp) for take-off

500 kW (670 hp) at 3,500 m (11,500 ft)

- Propellers: 2-bladed metal propeller

Performance

- Maximum speed: 309 km/h (192 mph, 167 kn) at 3,200 m (10,500 ft)
- Cruise speed: 222 km/h (138 mph, 120 kn) at 1,000 m (3,300 ft)
- Range: 926 km (575 mi, 500 nmi)
- Service ceiling: 6,980 m (22,900 ft)
- Time to altitude: 3,000 m (9,800 ft) in seven minutes and 51 seconds

Armament

- Guns:
  - 2 × fixed 7.7 mm (0.303 in) Type 92 machine guns
  - 1 × flexible 7.7 mm (0.303 in) Type 92 machine gun
- Bombs:
  - 1 × 250 kg (550 lb) bomb under fuselage
  - 2 × 30 kg (66 lb) bombs under wings

== See also ==
Related development

- Heinkel He 50

Aircraft of comparable role, configuration, and era

- Curtiss SBC Helldiver
- Henschel Hs 123
- Polikarpov R-5

Related lists

- List of bomber aircraft
- List of military aircraft of Japan
