= Heinkel He 50 =

German World War II-era dive bomber

He 50
- A Heinkel He 50 of a night ground-attack unit on the Eastern Front.

General information
- Type: Dive bomber
- Manufacturer: Heinkel
- Primary user: Luftwaffe
- Number built: 78

History
- Introduction date: 1935
- First flight: 1931
- Retired: 1944
- Variant: Aichi D1A

The Heinkel He 50 was a biplane dive bomber designed and produced by the German aircraft manufacturer Heinkel. Although not built in large numbers, it served in the Second World War.

The He 50 was originally designed during the early 1930s on behalf of the Imperial Japanese Navy; this goal was effectively fulfilled as it became the basis for the Aichi D1A. The initial prototype, the Heinkel He 50aW, proved to be underpowered. The adoption of alternative engines on further prototypes rectified this, the aircraft becoming noted for its favourable flying qualities and short take-off distances. The He 50 quickly secured the attention of local officials, leading to it being adopted by the newly-formed Luftwaffe.

During 1935, the He 50 was delivered to the first dive-bombing unit of the Luftwaffe; it would be operated by a total of ten such units. However, by the start of the Second World War, the type was already being displaced by newer aircraft, such as the Henschel Hs 123 and the Junkers Ju 87. However, the He 50 remained in service in secondary roles, particularly with training units. Mid-way through the Second World War, most remaining aircraft were transferred back to combat use as a night harassment bomber on the Eastern Front. In this capacity, the He 50 served until almost the end of the conflict.

== Development ==
During 1931, the Japanese Navy placed an order with Heinkel to produce a twin-seat dive bomber that was capable of carrying 250 kg (550 lb) of bombs, stressed for catapult launches, and capable of using either wheeled or float undercarriages. The resulting aircraft was a further development of the company's previous combat aircraft dating back to the First World War while also incorporating various improvements and advances to fulfil changing expectations as well as recent advances in aeronautical knowledge.

During the summer of 1931, an initial prototype, the Heinkel He 50aW, was completed. In terms of its general configuration, it was a biplane of mixed construction, outfitted with twin floats and powered by a single Junkers L5 inline engine. Flight testing found that this engine was somewhat underpowered. A second prototype, the He 50aL, was built; it was powered by a Siemens Jupiter VI radial engine and had a wheeled undercarriage. A second He 50aL was also produced, it was later redesignated He 50b. Based on the He 50b, a third prototype designated Heinkel He 66 was completed for the Japanese Navy; it was used as the basis of the Aichi D1A.

== Design ==
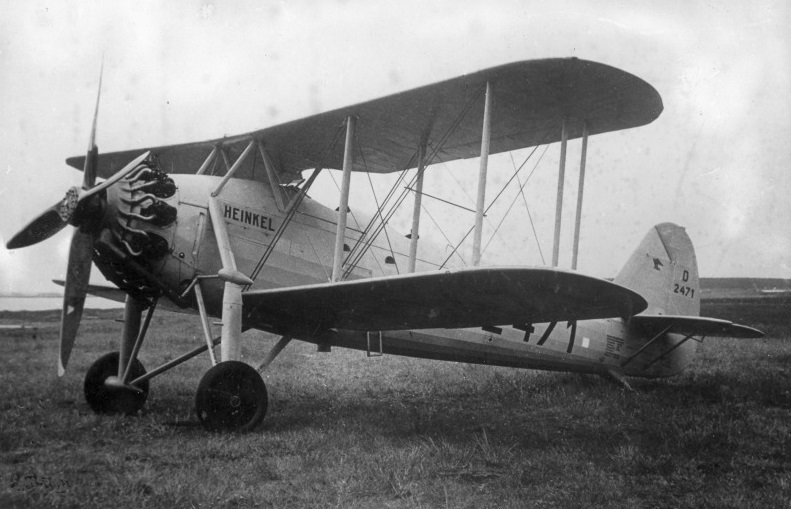
A prototype He 50, circa 1932

The He 50 was an equal-span biplane. It was a relatively stable and sturdy aircraft that was capable of achieving a fairly high speed as well as a relatively very low landing speed. It possessed favourable flying qualities, a long radius of action, and required only a short take-off distance. Its smooth and short take-off performance has been partially attributed to the relatively low wing loading of the aircraft. Furthermore, the He 50 was a well-balanced aircraft.

The fuselage of the He 50 had a rectangular cross section with a sturdy arched upper surface. Towards the rear, the fuselage sloped upwards in order to elevate the tail and keep it above the water at all times. The primary structure featured welded steel tube construction that was faired to form an oval shape using wooden formers and stringers. This structure comprised four tubular longerons with welded tubular bulkheads, complete with internal bracing using a combination of steel cables and tubular struts wherever it was deemed necessary to do so. The exterior was covered by doped fabric, except in the extreme nose, which was skinned in light alloy.

The wings of the He 50 had a marginal stagger and very slight sweep; ailerons were present on all four panels. Its arched wing section was achieved via a pair of high box girders that were deemed to be suitable for performing aerobatic manoeuvers. The ribs have spruce flanges and plywood webs while the inside bracing consisted of steel tubing. Both wing halves were attached to the fuselage via hook fittings. They were braced against the floats using N-shaped struts and were overhung by roughly two-thirds. The leading edge of the wing was composed of plywood while the whole wing was covered with doped fabric.

The He 50 could be powered by a variety of engines in the 350-500 hp range, including various foreign-sourced powerplants. The engine and associated accessories (such as cooling elements) were mounted upon a series of steel tubes that were in turn secured to the ends of the four primary longerons via four conical bolts that made it relatively easy to replace. A steel bulkhead separated the engine from the pilot's cockpit, who could quickly cut the flow of fuel to the engine via a conveniently placed stopcock along the fuel pipe. All of the fuel was housed in tanks within the wing, which was supplied to the engine via pumps.

The pilot's cockpit was directly aft of the engine in a relatively forward position that permitted the front ends of the floats to be clearly viewed during both take off runs and while alighting. A pair of seats were present behind the pilot, which had good downwards visibility that was in part achieved via cut-outs present in the trailing edge of the wing. The interior space of the fuselage was relatively spacious and provided sufficient room for the installation of both radio apparatus and sophisticated cameras in addition to baggage.

The undercarriage consisted of cold-drawn tubular steel struts that were streamlined with balsa. The manner in which the shocks incurred during landing were conveyed directly to the primary mass of the aircraft, thus relieving the stresses imposed upon the floats was a key factor in the aircraft's particularly positive seaworthiness. These floats were attached via clamps to the ends of the transverse distance struts of the undercarriage in a manner that permitted their rapid detachment if required. Rigidity of the landing gear was maintained by a longitudinal tube for each pair of junctions. Each float has a continuous plywood top and duralumin bottom while the internal space was divided into a number of water-tight compartments using bulkheads with wood ribs and plywood walls. The displacement of each float was somewhat greater than the flying weight of the seaplane, permitting one float on its own to support the seaplane on the water. Each float had a single step with a keel-shaped bottom behind this step.

== Operational history ==
The He 50aL was redesignated He 50 V1 and demonstrated to the German Defence Ministry in 1932. This resulted in an order for three development aircraft, and a production batch of 60 He 50A-1 aircraft, which were built during the summer of 1933. The Republic of China placed an order for 12 He 50As, but modified with an engine cowling added and designated He 66b. These aircraft were commandeered by the Luftwaffe and redesignated He 50B. In 1935, the He 50 was delivered to the Luftwaffe's first dive bomber unit, and later partially equipped nine other dive bombing units. The He 50, however, was steadily replaced by the Henschel Hs 123 and Junkers Ju 87, after which He 50s were transferred to dive bomber training units.

In spring 1943, following the success of the Soviet VVS's Night Witches units against the Wehrmacht Heer's frontline encampments while flying their Polikarpov Po-2 biplanes on nocturnal harassment raids, surviving He 50s were rounded up from training schools and delivered to night ground attack units operating on the Eastern Front. The He 50 was used to conduct night harassment sorties on the Eastern Front until October 1944, when the units were disbanded.

According to an author Lennart Andersson, twelve He 66 were allegedly ordered by China in 1934, but not delivered, and a claim that twelve ex-Luftwaffe He 50Bs were sent to China in 1936 instead, is a fiction, without a trace in archives.

== Variants ==
Data from Eden and Moeng

He 50aW
First prototype as a floatplane, powered by a 291 kW (390 hp) Junkers L5 inline engine, badly damaged in a forced landing.
He 50aL
Second prototype as a landplane, powered by a 365 kW (490 hp) Siemens Jupiter VI radial engine.
He 50b
Third prototype designated He 66 for export to Japan, three more completed for German evaluation, powered by a 373 kW (600 hp) Bramo 322B radial.
He 50A
Dive bomber, reconnaissance version for the Luftwaffe, 60 aircraft built.
He 50L
Redesignated of the He 50A, production model, Heinkel produced 25, Bayerische Flugzeugwerke produced 35, powered by a 373 kW (600 hp) Bramo 322B radial.
He 66aCh
12 exported to China, powered by a 358 kW (480 hp) Siemens Jupiter VIIF radial.
He 66bCh
Powered by a Bramo 322B engine, 12 built for export to China, but impressed into Luftwaffe service as He 50B, later delivered to Hong Kong and remained in storage from January 1936 until July 1937, transferred to Peking for limited service in the 2nd Sino-Japanese War.
Aichi D1A1

Some He 66 reconnaissance aircraft were built by Aichi in Japan.
Aichi D1A2

Improved version of the Aichi D1A1.

== Operators ==
Japan

- Imperial Japanese Navy - one prototype He 50b

China
12 He 66aCh, 12 He 66bCh
Germany
60 He 50A in Luftwaffe service
Spain

- Spanish Air Force

== Specifications (He 50A) ==
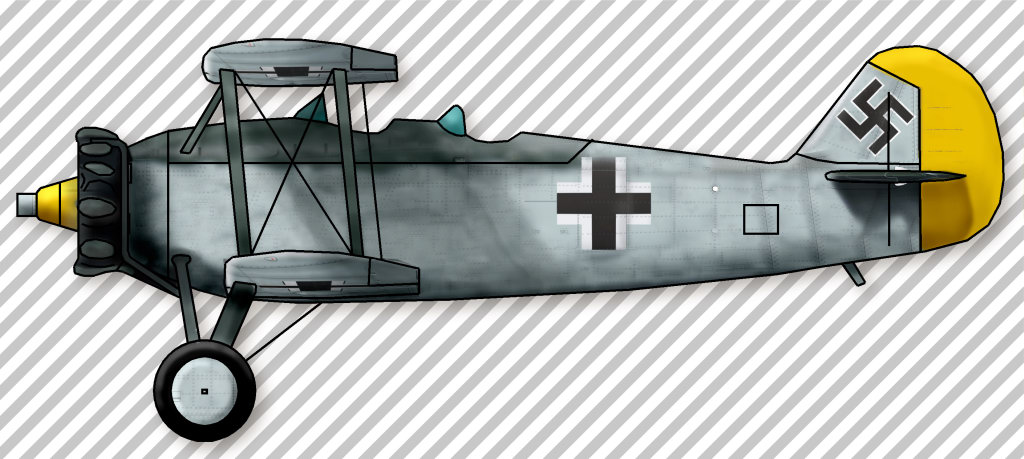
Side-on view of a He 50

Data from German Aircraft of World War II and The Complete Encyclopedia of World Aircraft

General characteristics

- Crew: 2
- Length: 9.6 m (31 ft 6 in)
- Wingspan: 11 m (36 ft 1 in)
- Height: 4.5 m (14 ft 9 in)
- Wing area: 34.8 m^{2} (375 sq ft)
- Powerplant: 1 × Bramo 322B nine-cylinder air-cooled radial piston engine, 485 kW (650 hp) (SAM 22B)
- Propellers: 3-bladed variable-pitch propeller

Performance

- Maximum speed: 235 km/h (146 mph, 127 kn)
- Cruise speed: 190 km/h (120 mph, 100 kn)
- Range: 1,000 km (620 mi, 540 nmi)
- Service ceiling: 6,400 m (21,000 ft)
- Rate of climb: 4.2 m/s (830 ft/min)

Armament

- Guns: 1 × 7.92 mm (0.312 in) MG 15 machine gun for rear seat.
- Bombs: Up to 250 kg (551 lb) bomb load.

== See also ==
Related development

- Aichi D1A

Aircraft of comparable role, configuration, and era

- Curtiss F8C Helldiver
- Polikarpov Po-2

Related lists

- List of military aircraft of Germany
