= Attrition =

Attrition may refer to

- Attrition warfare, the military strategy of wearing down the enemy by continual losses in personnel and materiel
  - War of Attrition, fought between Egypt and Israel from 1968 to 1970
  - War of attrition (game), a model of aggression in game theory
- Loss of personnel by withdrawal (military)
- Attrition (research), loss of participants during an experiment.
- Attrition (dental), loss of tooth structure by mechanical forces from opposing teeth
- Attrition (erosion), the wearing away of rocks in rivers or the sea
- Attrition (film), also known as Final Mission, 2018 american film
- Imperfect contrition, also known as attrition, in Catholic theology
- Customer attrition, loss of business clients or customers
- Language attrition, loss of first language ability by multilingual speakers
  - Second language attrition, loss of second language ability

== Proper names ==
- Attrition (band), an electronic music band
- Attrition (website), a security website

== See also ==
- Attrition rate
- Deterioration (disambiguation)
- Retention (disambiguation)
