= Dive bomber =

Bomber aircraft that dives directly at its targets

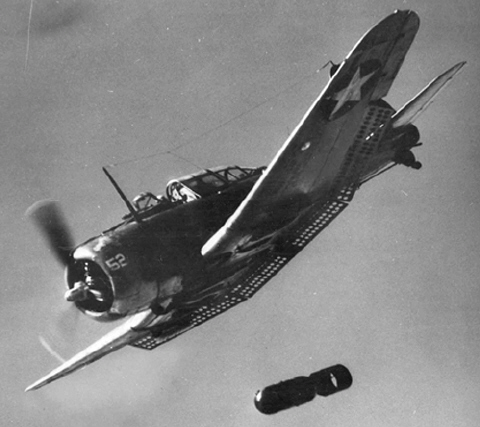
A Douglas SBD Dauntless drops its bomb. The dive brakes are extended and are visible behind the wings.

A dive bomber is a tactical bomber aircraft that attacks its target by performing fast dives in order to provide greater accuracy for the aerial bomb it drops. Diving directly towards the target before releasing gives the bomb a faster overall speed and a greater terminal momentum, straightens the bomb's free-fall trajectory, and allows the pilot to keep visual contact throughout the bomb run. This allows more focused attacks on point targets and ships, which were difficult to attack with conventional level bombers even en masse.

Dive bombers are typically light bombers or fighter-bombers with great aerial agility, and were especially effective against vehicles early in World War II when Nazi Germany's combined arms doctrine integrated the Luftwaffe into the Blitzkrieg. After World War II, the rise of precision-guided munitions and improved anti-aircraft defences—both fixed gunnery positions and fighter interception—led to a fundamental change in dive bombing. New weapons, such as rockets, allowed for better accuracy from smaller dive angles and from greater distances. They could be fitted to almost any aircraft, including fighters, improving their effectiveness without the inherent vulnerabilities of dive bombers, which needed air superiority to operate effectively.

== Method ==
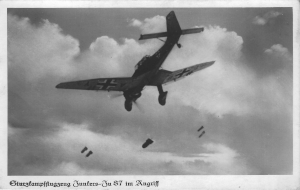
Dive fighter Junkers Ju 87 on the attack, often accompanied with screaming sound of the Lärmgerät or "Stuka siren"

A dive bomber dives at a steep angle, normally between 45 and 60 degrees or even up to a near vertical dive of 80 degrees with the Junkers Ju 87, and thus requires an abrupt pull-up after dropping its bombs. This puts great strains on both the pilot and aircraft. It demands an aircraft of strong construction, with some means to slow its dive. This limited the class to light bomber designs with ordnance loads in the range of 1,000 lb (450 kg) although there were larger examples.

The most famous examples are the Junkers Ju 87 Stuka (short for Sturzkampfflugzeug, dive fighter), which was widely used during the opening stages of World War II often accompanied with the screaming sound of its sirens, the Aichi D3A "Val" dive bomber, which sank more Allied warships during the war than any other Axis aircraft, and the Douglas SBD Dauntless, which sank more Japanese ships than any other allied aircraft type. The SBD Dauntless helped win the Battle of Midway, was instrumental in the victory at the Battle of the Coral Sea, and fought in every US battle involving carrier aircraft.

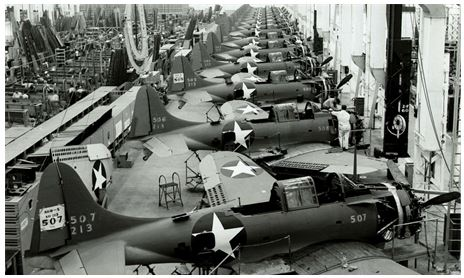
Final assembly view of SBD Dauntless dive bombers in 1943 at the Douglas Aircraft Company plant in El Segundo, California. The dive brakes are visible behind the wings.

An alternative technique, glide-bombing (attacks made from an altitude of less than 8,000 feet and at an angle of less than 70°), allowed the use of heavier aircraft, which faced far greater difficulties in recovering from near-vertical approaches, though it required greater use of sophisticated bombsights and aiming techniques, by a specialised member of aircrews, namely a bombardier/bomb aimer. The crews of multi-engined dive-bombers, such as variants of the Junkers Ju 88 and Petlyakov Pe-2, frequently used this technique. The heaviest aircraft to have dive-bombing included in its design and development, the twin engine Heinkel He 177, also utilised a glide-bombing approach; the requirement that the He 177 be able to dive/glide-bomb delayed its development and impaired its overall performance.

Dive bombing was most widely used before and during World War II; its use declined during the war, when its vulnerability to enemy fighters became apparent. In the post-war era, this role was replaced with a combination of improved and automated bombsights, larger weapons and even nuclear warheads that greatly reduced the need for accuracy, and finally by precision guided weapons as they became available in the 1960s. Most tactical aircraft today allow bombing in shallow dives to keep the target visible, but true dive bombers have not been a part of military forces since the start of the jet age.

== Accuracy ==
When released from an aircraft, a bomb carries with it the aircraft's trajectory. In the case of a bomber flying horizontally, the bomb will initially only be travelling forward. This forward motion is opposed by the drag of the air, so the forward motion decreases over time. Additionally, gravity causes the bomb to accelerate after it is dropped. The combination of these two forces, drag and gravity, results in a complex pseudo-parabolic trajectory.

The distance that the bomb moves forward while it falls is known as its range. If the range for a given set of conditions is calculated, simple trigonometry can be used to find the angle between the aircraft and the target. By setting the bombsight to this "range angle", the aircraft can time the drop of its bombs at the instant when the target is lined up in the sight. This was only effective for "area bombing", however, since the path of the bomb is only roughly estimated. Large formations could drop bombs on an area hoping to hit a specific target, but there was no guarantee of success, and huge areas around the target would also be hit. The advantage to this approach, however, was that it is easy to build such an aircraft and fly it at high altitude, keeping it out of range of ground-based defences.

The horizontal bomber was thus ill-suited for tactical bombing, particularly in close support. Attempts at using high-altitude bombing in near-proximity to troops often ended in tragedy, with bombs both hitting their targets and friendly troops indiscriminately. In attacking shipping, the problems of inaccuracy were amplified by the fact that the target could be moving, and could change its direction between the time that the bombs were released and the time that they arrived. Successful strikes on marine vessels by horizontal bombers were extremely rare. An example of this problem can be seen in the attempts to attack the Japanese carriers using B-17s at altitude in the Battle of Midway, with no hits scored. The German battleship Tirpitz was subjected to countless attacks, many while in dock and immobile, but was not sunk until the British brought in enormous 12,000 lb (5,400 kg) Tallboy bombs to ensure that even a near miss would be effective.

An aircraft diving vertically minimises its horizontal velocity component. When the bomb is dropped, the force of gravity simply increases its speed along its nearly vertical trajectory. The bomb travels a virtually straight line between release and impact, eliminating the need for complex calculations. The aircraft simply aims at the target and releases its bombs. The primary source of error is the effect of wind on the bomb's flight path after release. As bombs are streamlined and heavy, wind has only a slight effect on them and the bomb is likely to fall within its lethal radius of the target.

Bomb sighting becomes trivial, requiring only a straight line of sight to the target. This was simplified as the aircraft was pointed directly at the target, making sighting over the nose much easier. Differences in the path of different bombs due to differing ballistics can be corrected by selecting a standardised bombing altitude and then adjusting the dive angle slightly for each case. As the bomber dives, the aim could be continually adjusted. In contrast, when a horizontal bomber veers offline while approaching the bomb release point, turning to the angle that would correct this also changes the speed of the aircraft over the ground (when there is a wind) and thereby changes the range as well.

In the 1930s and early 1940s, dive bombing was the best method for attacking high-value compact targets, like bridges and ships, with accuracy. The forces generated when the aircraft levels out at the bottom of the dive are considerable. The drawback of modifying and strengthening an aircraft for near-vertical dives was the loss of performance. Aside from the greater strength requirements, during normal horizontal flight, aircraft are normally designed to return to fly straight and level, but when put into a dive the changes in forces affecting the aircraft now cause the aircraft to track across the target unless the pilot applies considerable force to keep the nose down, with a corresponding decrease in accuracy. To compensate, many dive bombers were designed to be trimmed out, either through the use of special dive flaps (such as Fairey Youngman flaps) or through changes in tailplane trim that must be readjusted when the dive is completed.

The Vultee Vengeance, which was mostly used by the RAF and RAAF in Burma, was designed to be trimmed for diving, with no lift to distort the dive. The drawback was that it flew nose up in level flight, increasing drag. Failure to re-adjust trim made the aircraft difficult or impossible to pull out of a dive.

A dive bomber was vulnerable to low-level ground fire as it dived towards its target, since it was often headed in a straight line directly towards the defenders. At higher levels, this was less of a problem, as larger AA (anti-aircraft) shells were fused to explode at specific altitudes, which is impossible to determine while the plane is diving. In addition, most higher-altitude gunners and gunnery systems were designed to calculate the lateral movement of a target; while diving, the target appears almost stationary. Also, many AA mounts lacked the ability to fire directly up, so dive bombers were almost never exposed to fire from directly ahead.

Dive brakes were employed on many designs to create drag which slowed the aircraft in its dive and increased accuracy. Air brakes on modern aircraft function in a similar manner in bleeding off excessive speed.

== Origins ==
It is difficult to establish how dive bombing originated. During World War I, the Royal Flying Corps (RFC) found its biplane two-seat bombers insufficiently accurate in operations on the Western Front. Commanders urged pilots to dive from their cruising altitude to under 500 ft (150 m) to have a better chance of hitting small targets, such as gun emplacements and trenches. As this exposed the aircraft and crew to destructive ground fire in their unprotected open cockpits, few followed this order. Some recorded altitude at the top and bottom of their dive in log books and in squadron records, but not the steepness of the dive. It was certainly not near-vertical, as these early aircraft could not withstand the stresses of a sustained vertical dive.

The Royal Naval Air Service was bombing the Zeppelin sheds in Germany and in occupied Belgium and found it worthwhile to dive onto these sheds to ensure a hit, despite the increased casualties from ground fire. Again, the angle of dive in these attacks was not recorded.

Beginning on 18 June 1918, the Royal Air Force (RAF), successor to the RFC, ordered large numbers of the Sopwith TF.2 Salamander, a single-seat biplane. The "TF" stood for "Trench Fighter", and the aircraft was designed to attack enemy trenches both with Vickers .303 machine guns and with 25 lb (11 kg) bombs. Of the 37 Salamanders produced before the end of October 1918, only two were delivered to France, and the war ended before those saw action. Whether the Salamander counts in more modern parlance as a fighter-bomber or as a dive bomber depends on the definition of "dive". It had armoured protection for the pilot and a fuel system to attack at low level, but lacked dive brakes for a vertical dive.

Heavy casualties resulting from air-to-ground attack on trenches set the minds of senior officers in the newly formed RAF against dive bombing. So not until 1934 did the Air Ministry issue specifications for both land-based and aircraft carrier-based dive bombers. The RAF cancelled its requirement and relegated the Hawker Henley dive bomber to other roles, while the Fleet Air Arm's Blackburn Skua was expected to do double duty: as a fighter when out of reach of land-based fighter support, and as a dive bomber. It had dive brakes that doubled as flaps for carrier landings. The Hawker Henley had a top speed only 50 mph (80 km/h) slower than the Hawker Hurricane fighter from which it was derived. The American and Japanese navies and the Luftwaffe chose vertical dive bombers whose low speed had dire consequences when they encountered modern fighters.

== World War I ==
The Royal Naval Air Service developed dive bombing as a tactic against Zeppelin hangars and formed and trained a squadron at Manchester for this task. On 8 October 1914, a Sopwith Tabloid with two 50 lb (23 kg) bombs attacked a hangar at Düsseldorf after a dive to 600 ft (180 m). On 14 November 1914, four Avro 504s attacked the Zeppelin factory at Friedrichshafen on Lake Constance, diving from 1,200 ft (370 m) to 500 ft (150 m) to ensure hits. As Zeppelins were tethered close to stores of hydrogen, results were often spectacular.

The first use of dive bombing by the RFC, which had been urging its pilots to drop bombs at heights below 500 ft (150 m) in order to hit within 150 ft (46 m) of the target since February 1915, was later that year. On 27 November 1915, Lieutenant Duncan Grinnell-Milne arrived in his Royal Aircraft Factory B.E.2c over railway marshalling yards near Lys in Northern France, to find the target already crowded by other bombers. He dived from 10,000 ft (3,000 m) to 2,000 ft (610 m) before releasing his 20 lb (9.1 kg) bombs. A few weeks later, Lieutenant Arthur Gould dived to just 100 ft (30 m) to hit buildings near Arras.

The Royal Flying Corps developed strafing with diving aircraft using both machine guns and small bombs as a deliberate tactic. At the Battle of Cambrai on 20 November 1917, 320 Mark IV tanks and 300 aircraft, mostly Sopwith Camels and Airco DH 5s with 20 lb (9.1 kg) bombs, were used to suppress artillery and machine guns. The cost in pilots was very high, with casualties on some days reaching 30 percent. The initial impact at Cambrai was highly successful. The staff officer to the Royal Tank Corps Lieutenant-Colonel J. F. C. Fuller published findings which were later taken up by Heinz Guderian to form the basis for the blitzkrieg tactics of using dive bombers with tanks employed by the Germans in 1939–40.

Second Lieutenant William Henry Brown, a Canadian from British Columbia serving with the RFC and flying a Royal Aircraft Factory S.E.5a, made the first attack on a vessel on 14 March 1918, destroying an ammunition barge on a canal at Bernot near St Quentin, diving to 500 ft (150 m) to release his bombs. He was awarded the Military Cross for this and other exploits. Brown's technique was emulated by other British squadrons. But the heavy casualties to unprotected pilots cast a pall over the results and influenced RAF thinking for 20 years.

== Interwar era ==
The Royal Flying Corps was initially impressed with the potential of the dive bomber, but was aware of its suicidal nature. It ran a series of tests at the Armament Experimental station at Orfordness in Suffolk. Sopwith Camels and Royal Aircraft Factory S.E.5as were used in early 1918 to dive bomb targets from various heights, with different bombs and with and without the use of the Aldis gunsight, which had been invented in 1916 to aid pilots to calculate the deflection required to hit a traversing enemy aircraft. In principle, it obviated the need for a vertical dive. The results showed that a vertical dive into the wind sighting along the top of rather than through the sight was best. But they were not considered good enough to justify the expected casualties. The Royal Air Force, which took over both army and naval aviation in April 1918, retired its Sopwith Salamander dive bombers at the end of the war.

Colonel, later general, Billy Mitchell arrived in France with the first US Army and Air Force units soon after 6 April 1917 and began to organise the US Army Air Force flying French Salmson 2s, a spotter plane. The later Salmson 4 was to be a ground attack and dive bomber, but production was cancelled at the end of the war. Mitchell became a strong advocate of dive bombers after witnessing British and French aerial attacks. Mitchell, by now assistant chief of the Air Service United States Army, arranged tests with captured German and obsolete US ships in June and July 1921 and repeated over the next two years using Royal Aircraft Factory S.E.5as as dive bombers and Handley Page O/400s and Martin NBS-1s as level bombers carrying bombs of different weights up to 2,000 lb (910 kg). The SMS Ostfriesland was sunk and so later were the USS Alabama, USS Virginia and USS New Jersey.

Opposite conclusions were drawn by the RAF and USAS, from two very different tests regarding the usefulness of dive bombers, with the RAF concluding that the cost in pilots was too high to justify the results and the USAS considering it as a potent anti-ship weapon. Both naval staffs opposed the view taken by the respective airmen.

In 1919, United States Marine Corps (USMC) pilot Lt. L. H. Sanderson mounted a rifle in front of the windshield of his Curtiss JN-4 (a training aircraft) as an improvised bomb sight, loaded a bomb in a canvas bag attached to the aircraft's underside, and made a solo attack in support of USMC troops trapped by Haitians during the United States occupation of Haiti. Sanderson's bomb hit its target and the raids were repeated. During 1920, Sanderson familiarised aviators of USMC units on the Atlantic coast with dive bombing techniques. Dive bombing was also used during the United States occupation of Nicaragua.

As aircraft grew more powerful, dive bombing became a favoured tactic, particularly against small targets such as ships. The United States Navy overcame its hostility to Mitchell's findings and deployed the Curtiss F8C Falcon biplane from 1925 on carriers, while the Marine Corps operated them from land bases as the Helldiver, a name later reused by Curtiss for other dive bombers.

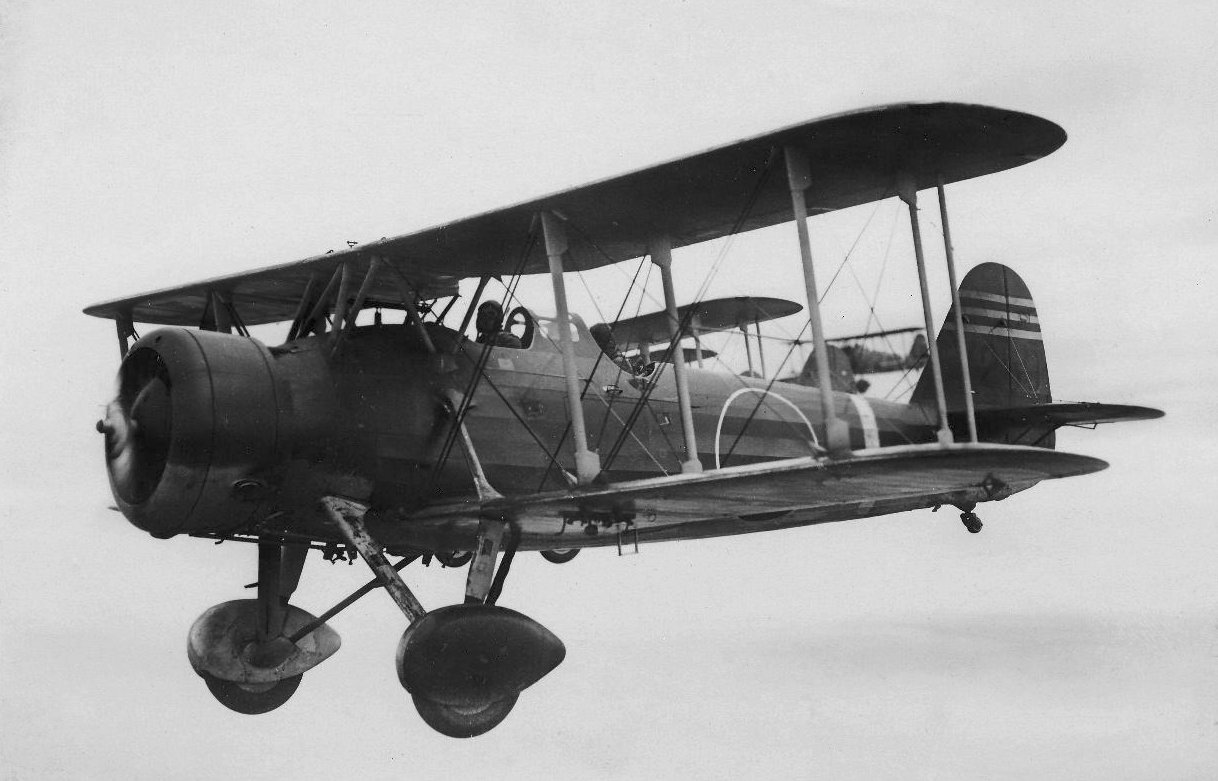
The Aichi D1A2, a carrier-borne dive bomber

The Imperial Japanese Navy ordered the Heinkel He 50 in 1931 as a floatplane and carrier-based dive bomber and embarked some on new carriers from 1935 in a developed form as the Heinkel He 66, from which the Aichi D1A was further developed in Japan. The Luftwaffe confiscated a Chinese export shipment and ordered more.

Navies increasingly operated carriers, which had a limited number of aircraft available for attack, each with only a small bomb load. Targets were often likely to be small or fast-moving and the need for accuracy made dive bombers essential.

Ernst Udet, a German First World War ace, persuaded Hermann Göring to buy two Curtiss Hawk IIs for the newly reformed Luftwaffe. Udet, then a stunt pilot, flew one in aerobatic displays during the 1936 Berlin Olympic Games. Due to his connections with the Nazi party, he became the development director of the Ministry of Aviation, where he pushed for dive bomber development.

Dive bombing would allow a low-cost Luftwaffe to operate effectively in the tactical role. Against small targets, a single-engine dive bomber could achieve four times the accuracy at one tenth of the cost of a four-engine heavy bomber, such as the projected Ural bomber, and it could reach the battlefield well ahead of field artillery. Soon the Luftwaffe issued a contract for its own dive bomber design, resulting in the Junkers K 47, which, following extensive trials, would in turn result in the Junkers Ju 87 Stuka (a contraction of Sturzkampfflugzeug, literally 'diving combat airplane').

Several early Junkers Ju 87 dive bombers, which first flew on 13 September 1935, were shipped secretly from Germany to Spain to assist General Francisco Franco's Nationalist rebels in the Spanish Civil War. Several problems appeared, including the tendency of the fixed undercarriage to sink into soft ground and an inability to take-off with a full bomb load. The Condor Legion's experience in Spain demonstrated the value of dive bombers, especially on the morale of troops or civilians unprotected by air cover. The aircraft did not encounter opposing modern fighters, which concealed its vulnerability from the Luftwaffe. Udet was impressed with the Stuka's performance in Spain, so he ordered that the Junkers Ju 88 medium bomber should also be retrofitted as a dive bomber. He also insisted, against the advice of Ernst Heinkel, that the Heinkel He 177 bomber, ordered in November 1937, be able to dive bomb. The lack of a sufficiently powerful, reliable powerplant fatally compromised its utility, and it never performed in the dive bomber role. The requirement was eventually dropped.

Some 23 Breda Ba 65s were flown by Italian pilots also in support of Nationalist forces. First flown in 1935, it was a single-seat dive bomber carrying the same bomb load as the Stuka with a 30 mph (48 km/h) speed advantage in level flight.

As the Royal Navy again took control of the Fleet Air Arm, it began to receive the Fairey Swordfish from 1936 and Blackburn Skuas from November 1938. The Skua had a secondary function of intercepting attacks by unescorted long-range bombers. With four .303 Browning guns and another rear-facing gun, it was expected to defend against air attack with a top speed of 225 mph (362 km/h) at sea level, which was a low-altitude speed comparable with other navies' carrier borne fighters in 1938–39. The Royal Navy's dedicated, pre- and early-war, fleet fighter was the Gloster Sea Gladiator. The Imperial Japanese Navy (IJN) Mitsubishi A5M and USN Grumman F3F were nominally faster than the Skua but this speed was achieved at much higher altitudes; at low altitudes the Skua was quite comparable in speed and was also better armed. The Swordfish was also capable of operating as a dive-bomber and in 1939 HMS Glorious used her Swordfish for a series of dive-bombing trials, during which 439 practise bombs were dropped at dive angles of 60, 67 and 70 degrees, against the target ship HMS Centurion. Tests against a stationary target showed an average error of 49 yd (45 m) from a release height of 1,300 ft (400 m) and a dive angle of 70 degrees. Tests against a manoeuvring target showed an average error of 44 yd (40 m) from a drop height of 1,800 ft (550 m) and a dive angle of 60 degrees. The Fairey Albacore was also designed to act as a dive bomber and was used extensively in this role during World War Two.

The British Air Ministry issued Specification 4/34 in 1934 for a ground attack aircraft with dive bombing capability. The Hawker Henley was a two-seat version of the Battle of Britain-winning Hawker Hurricane. It was fast, at almost 300 mph (480 km/h) at sea level and 450 mph (720 km/h) in a dive, but development was delayed when Hurricane development took priority. Just 200 were built and it was relegated to target towing. The RAF ordered the US-built Vultee A-31 Vengeance in 1943, but it, too, was similarly relegated to target towing after a brief operation period in secondary theatres.

The Curtiss SBC Helldiver was a biplane dive bomber that had been taken aboard the USS Yorktown (CV-5) in 1934, but it was slow, at 234 mph (377 km/h). Fifty ex-US Navy examples were flown to Halifax, Nova Scotia, by Curtiss pilots and embarked on the French aircraft carrier Béarn in a belated attempt to help France, which surrendered while they were mid-Atlantic. Five airframes left behind in Halifax later reached the RAF, which quickly relegated them to the status of ground instructional airframes for the training of mechanics.

The Japanese introduced the Aichi D3A Val monoplane as a successor to the biplane Aichi D1A in 1940, with trials aboard the carriers Kaga and Akagi. It was to prove a potent weapon against surface ships.

Only the Wehrmacht learned from the Battle of Cambrai (1917) in using dive bombers in conjunction with tanks. The writings of Britain's Colonel J. F. C. Fuller, a staff officer, and Basil Liddell-Hart (a military journalist) propounded the concept of mobile tank forces supported by ground-attack aircraft creating a breakthrough. These were eagerly studied by the German army officer Heinz Guderian, who created the combination of Panzers and dive bombers that later proved so potent in Poland and France. The Ju 87 Stuka could be used as aerial artillery moving far ahead of the main forces with Panzers to smash enemy strong points without waiting for the horse-drawn artillery to catch up. It was central to the concept of Blitzkrieg, which required close co-ordination between aircraft and tanks by radio.

The RAF had chosen the single-engined Fairey Battle and the twin-engined Bristol Blenheim as its tactical bombers. Both were level bombers with similar bomb-loads and entered service in 1937. The US Army Air Corps (USAAC) adopted the Douglas A-20 Havoc, first flying in January 1939, for a similar role, although originally ordered by France. Many were also supplied to the Soviet Air Force, which also used the Ilyushin Il-2 Sturmovik ground-attack aircraft in huge numbers. None of these were dive bombers. No Allied air force operated a modern dive bomber at the outbreak of the Second World War, although both the Royal Navy and the US Navy had shipboard dive bombers.

== World War II ==
=== European theatre ===
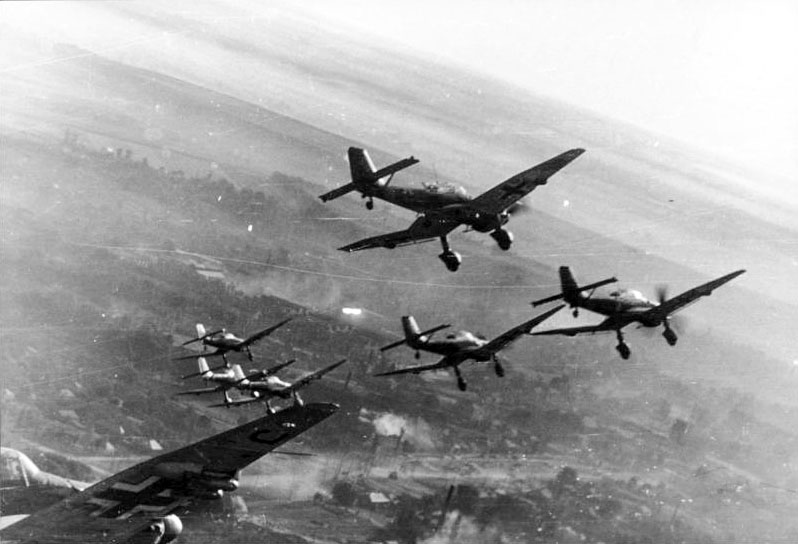
Ju 87D Stukas over the Eastern Front, December 1943

On 10 April 1940, 16 British Royal Navy Blackburn Skuas flying at extreme range from the naval air station at Hatston in Orkney led by Lieutenant Commander William Lucy sank the German cruiser Königsberg in Bergen harbour, whilst trying to prevent the German invasion of Norway. On the German side Stukas augmented or replaced artillery support for the Wehrmacht's lightly armed parachute and airborne troops.

The invasion of Poland (September to October 1939) and the Battle of France (May to June 1940) saw the Stuka used to devastating effect. German blitzkrieg tactics used dive bombers in place of artillery to support highly mobile ground troops. The British Expeditionary Force had set up strong defensive positions on the west bank of the Oise River to block rapidly advancing German armour. Stukas quickly broke the defences, and the Wehrmacht forced a crossing long before German artillery arrived.

On 12/13 May 1940, Stukas flew 300 sorties against strong French defensive positions at the Battle of Sedan. This enabled German forces to make a fast and unexpected breakthrough of the French lines, eventually leading to the German advance to the Channel and the cutting off of much of the Allied army.

The skies over Sedan also showed the Stuka's weakness when met with fighter opposition; six French Curtiss H-75s attacked a formation of unescorted Ju 87s and shot down 11 out of 12 without loss. The Stuka was even more vulnerable to the Hawker Hurricane with its 100 mph (160 km/h) speed edge and eight machine guns, which it first met over France and then in larger numbers in the Battle of Britain (July to October 1940). Losses were such that the Luftwaffe rapidly withdrew Stukas from operations over the United Kingdom. A similar fate befell unescorted RAF Fairey Battles over France.

The Stuka had 7.92mm machine guns or 20mm cannons mounted in the wings. Some were modified to destroy tanks with heavy calibre, 37mm Bordkanone BK 3,7 autocannons mounted in gun pods below the wings. They were very successful in this role in the early days (1941) of Operation Barbarossa before the Red Army Air Force countered with modern fighters, such as the Yakovlev Yak-1 and later the Yakovlev Yak-3.

The most successful dive-bomber pilot, Hans-Ulrich Rudel, made 2,530 sorties. He contributed to the sinking of the Soviet battleship Marat at Kronstadt on 23 September 1941 using 1,000 kg (2,200 lb) bombs. Later, flying a tank-buster Stuka with 20mm cannon, he claimed over 100 Soviet tanks destroyed, mostly at the Battle of Kursk in July 1943. The Ju 87G Kanonenvogel, equipped with two 37mm BK 3,7 anti-tank guns, as suggested by Rudel, proved to be a lethal weapon in skilled hands. In the Soviet counter-offensive, Operation Kutuzov (July to August 1943), which concluded Kursk, the Luftwaffe claimed 35 tanks destroyed in a single day. Rudel co-wrote a post-war book about his experiences and consulted with the US Air Force.

When Italy joined the war (10 June 1940) on the Axis side, the Regia Aeronautica shipped Breda Ba.65s to North Africa for use against the British but they also proved vulnerable. By February 1941 British fighters had shot down most of the Italian planes. In Morocco on 11 November 1942, American Curtiss P-40 Warhawks shot down 15 Ju 87Ds in one encounter.

The United States Army Air Forces took delivery of a few North American P-51 Mustangs from a British order but, as there were no funds to buy more fighters, they were modified as dive bombers with a new wing and with dive brakes. First flown in October 1942 as the North American A-36 Apache, they arrived in Morocco in April 1943 to assist with driving the Afrika Korps out of Africa. The aircraft was very fast at low altitude. It was also accident-prone, achieving the highest casualty-rate during training of any USAAF aircraft and was officially restricted to no more than a 70-degree dive. The Apache did not fly with the RAF, but served with US squadrons in Sicily, Italy and, by late summer of 1943, was based in India for use over Burma and China. It proved to be an excellent dive-bomber and a good fighter: one ace in Italy shot down five German fighters.

The Royal Navy's Fairey Swordfish and Fairey Albacore torpedo-dive bombers and Blackburn Skua fighter-bombers were replaced by Fairey Barracuda torpedo-dive bombers, which made repeated diving attacks on the German battleship Tirpitz which lay protected by torpedo nets in a Norwegian fjord during 1944. On 3 April 1944, in Operation Tungsten, 42 aircraft flying from the carriers HMS Victorious and HMS Furious scored 14 hits with 500 lb (230 kg) and 1,600 lb (730 kg) bombs and put the battleship out of action for over two months.

The Soviet Union Armed Forces deployed the Arkhangelsky Ar-2 from 1940 to 1944 and the Petlyakov Pe-2 from 1941 to 1954.

=== Pacific theatre ===
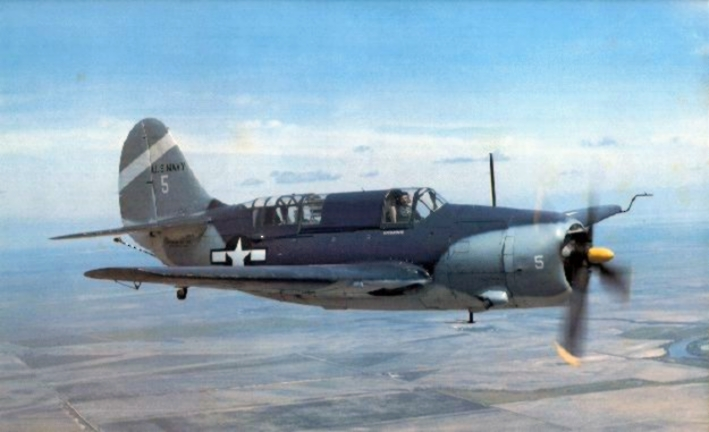
United States Navy Curtiss SB2C Helldiver dive bomber

The Vultee Vengeance was developed in the US as a private venture dive bomber for export. It first flew in March 1941. It had a zero incidence wing, which was perfect for vertical dives as there was no lift from wing or tailplane in a dive. But it had to fly in a nose up attitude to maintain level flight, which made landings difficult. Initial orders were 300 for France, but France fell before they could be delivered. The RAF, with the cancellation of the Hawker Henley and having noted the success of Stukas in Poland, took delivery instead. It was considered too vulnerable to German fighters for use in Europe or North Africa, but large numbers flew in Burma from March 1943. It flew close support for General William Slim's Burma campaign bombing Japanese supply routes, bridges and artillery. It operated in the Royal Australian Air Force and Indian Air Force as well as the RAF. Some were held back for the United States Army Air Forces after the attack on Pearl Harbor, but did not see combat.

Both the Imperial Japanese Navy (IJN) and the United States Navy invested considerable effort on dive bombers. Japan started the war with a very good design, the carrier-borne Aichi D3A ("Val"). As the war progressed, the design became outdated due to its limited speed, due in part to the limited horsepower of its power plant and to the greater drag of its fixed main landing gear (a shortcoming shared by the Stuka).

The main American dive bomber, the Douglas SBD Dauntless, had similar performance to the D3A Val. From December 1942, the Dauntless was replaced with the faster, but more complex and trouble-prone Curtiss SB2C Helldiver. Both American aeroplanes were ubiquitous, with 6,000 Dauntlesses and over 7,000 Helldivers built. Both the SBD and D3A were used at Pearl Harbor on 7 December 1941. The Japanese sent 54 D3A Vals carrying 550 lb (250 kg) bombs to attack parked aircraft at Wheeler Field and Ford Island. A flight of 18 Dauntlesses from USS Enterprise arrived over Pearl Harbor just as the Japanese attacked. Seven were shot down and many others destroyed on the ground at Marine Corps Air Station Ewa At the Battle of the Coral Sea, Dauntlesses sank the light carrier Shoho and damaged the fleet carrier Shokaku together with Douglas TBD Devastator torpedo bombers.

On 5 April 1942, the heavy cruisers HMS Cornwall and HMS Dorsetshire were leaving Colombo, Ceylon to join the British Eastern Fleet, but had been spotted by Japanese reconnaissance aircraft. They were attacked by a large number of Aichi D3As and both were sunk. On 9 April 1942 the Royal Navy aircraft carrier HMS Hermes escorted by the destroyer HMS Vampire were attacked by more than 32 Aichi D3As and both were sunk shortly before eight defending RN FAA Fairey Fulmars, of 806 Squadron, could reach them. The Fulmars shot down four D3As and damaged two while losing two Fulmars to the more numerous D3As.

At the Battle of Midway on 4 June 1942, after most of the torpedo bombers had been shot down without a single hit, Dauntlesses from USS Yorktown (CV-5) and USS Enterprise (CV-6) found four Japanese carriers, in the vulnerable stage of refuelling and rearming aircraft for a second strike. The Combat Air Patrol of formidable Mitsubishi A6M Zeros had been drawn away, chasing torpedo bombers and escorting fighters, leaving a clear sky. Soryu and Kaga were ablaze within six minutes, while Akagi, hit only once, suffered fatal damage as the single bomb ignited fuel and bombs in the hangar.

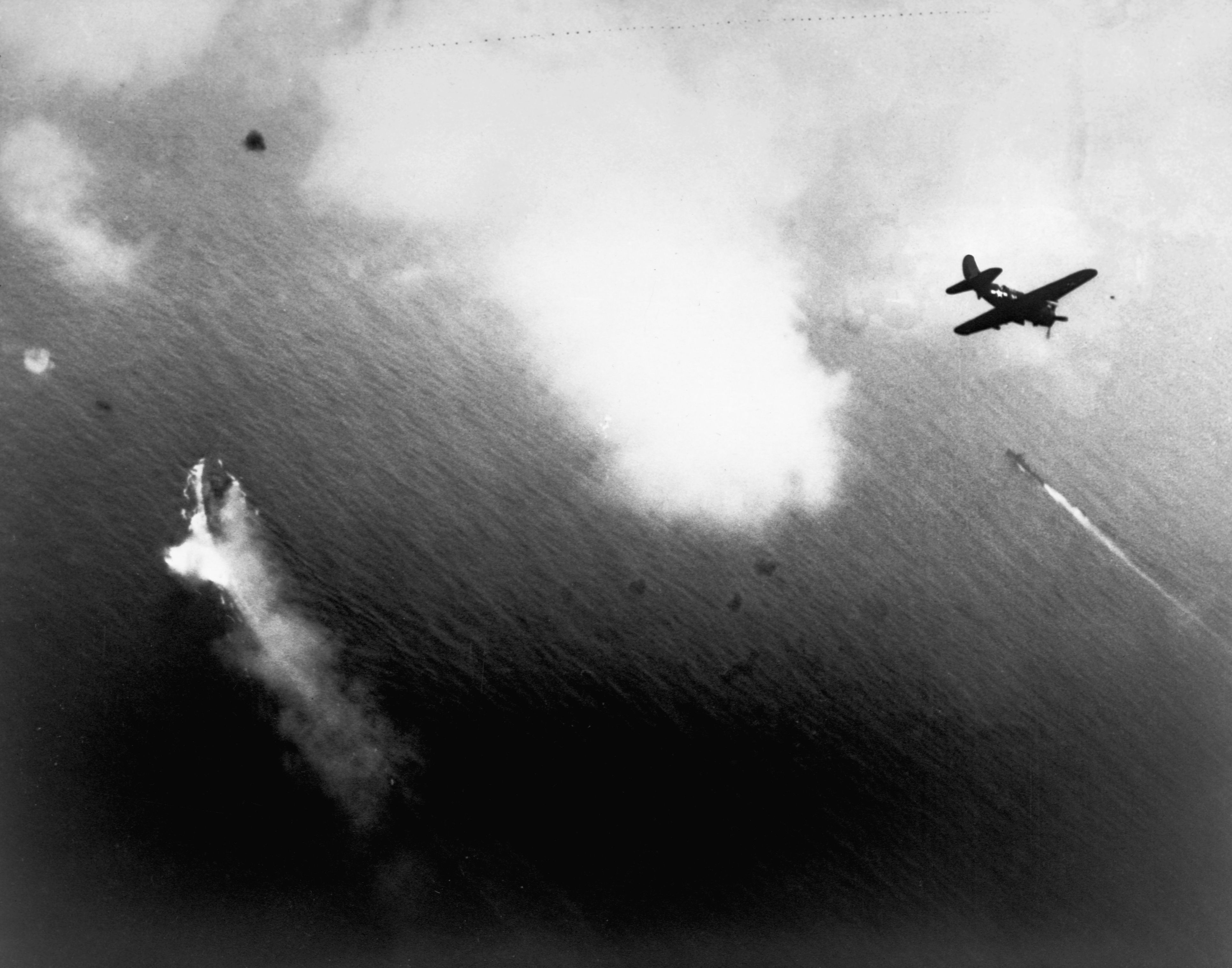
A SB2C Helldiver (visible at right) commences an attack against Yamato during Operation Ten-Go, 7 April 1945

Later on 4 June, Yorktown and Enterprise dive bombers inflicted fatal damage on the fourth Japanese carrier Hiryu. Within hours the Imperial Japanese Navy had lost four of its aircraft carriers and many experienced naval airmen, both of which Japan would have difficulty in replacing. Further follow-up raids by SBDs and SB2Us from Midway and SBDs from Yorktown, Enterprise and USS Hornet (CV-8) on 5–6 June sank the IJN heavy cruiser Mikuma and heavily damaged her sister ship Mogami and two escorting destroyers.

The United States Army Air Forces took a version of the Dauntless with a different tailwheel tire and no arrester hook as the Douglas A-24 Banshee. In crates headed for the Philippines, they were diverted to Australia and operated from Charters Towers in Queensland. The Banshee was unable to contend with Japanese Mitsubishi A6M Zeros. On 26 July 1942, just seven Banshees were sent to intercept a Japanese convoy supplying forces occupying New Guinea. Six were shot down.

The Japanese Yokosuka D4Y Suisei, code-name Judy, began to replace the Vals after a very troublesome development on surviving larger Japanese carriers from March 1943. With a sleek fuselage, retracting landing gear and a powerful licensed Daimler-Benz 601 engine, it could outpace pursuing Grumman F4F Wildcats. To maximise speed and range, the Japanese had dispensed with armour protection and self-sealing fuel tanks, which proved to be very costly when the US Navy deployed the new Essex-class aircraft carriers, which each carried 36 of the faster Grumman F6F Hellcats. The Battle of the Philippine Sea on 19–20 June 1944 was a failure in terms of Japanese carriers hit, but the losses of Vals and Judies and their crews were enough to destroy the Japanese navy's ability to strike by air ever again.

Henceforward attacks were mostly confined to kamikaze. The Japanese were now on the defensive. Japan's industrial output dropped from a peak in 1942, while that of the US increased by a quarter in two years from 1942 to 1944. Japanese wartime production of bombers of all types was just 16% of the US output.

=== Decline ===
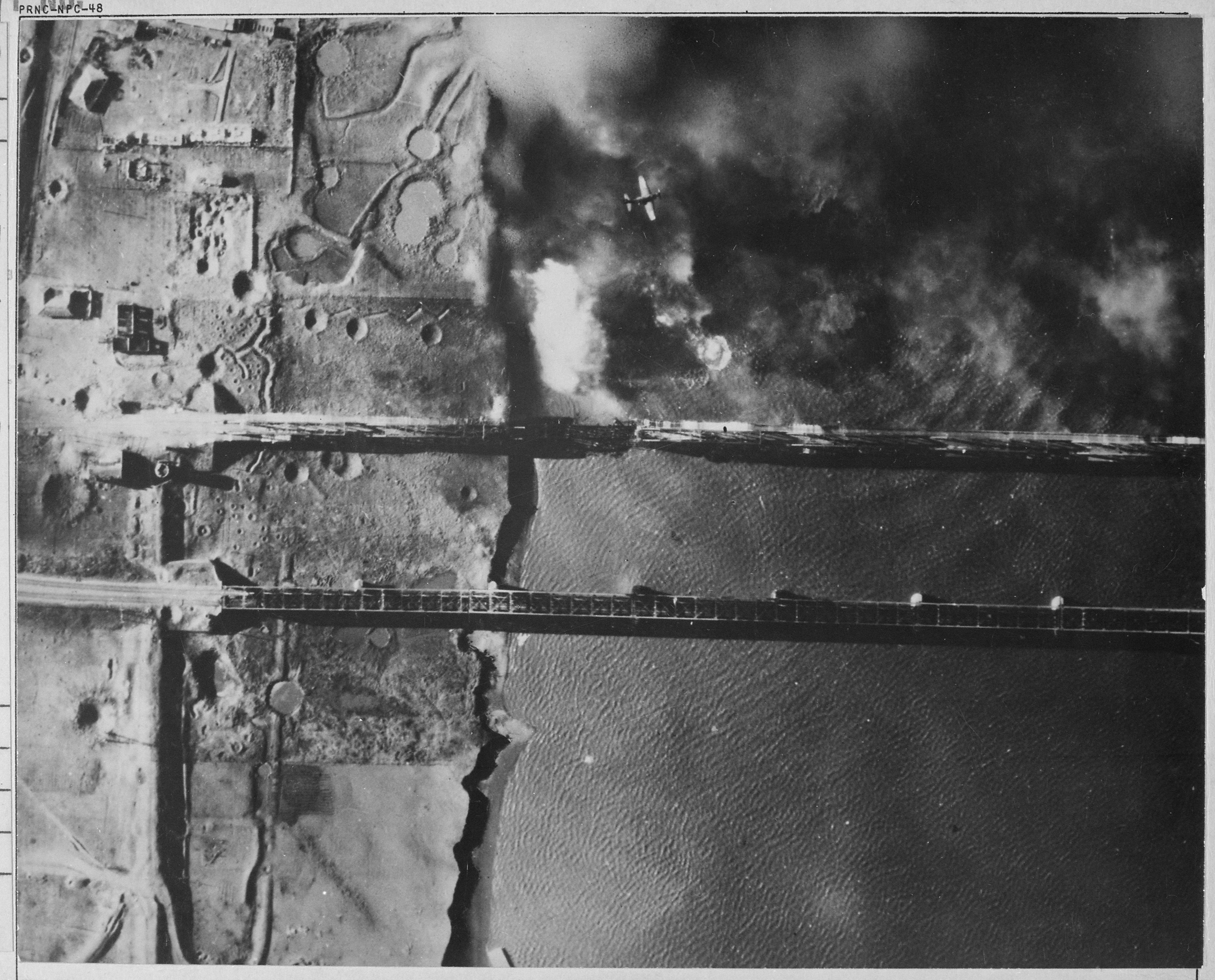
US Navy AD-3 pulls out of dive after dropping a 2,000-pound (910 kg) bomb on the Korean side of a bridge crossing the Yalu River at Sinuiju, 15 November 1950.

When the RAF were attempting to stop the Panzers of Erwin Rommel's Afrika Korps in early 1942, a lack of dive bombers proved to be an impediment. However, the British Government's Chief Scientist, Henry Tizard, formed a panel of experts, which recommended using rockets. A rocket has a much flatter trajectory than a bomb, allowing it to be launched with reasonable accuracy from a shallow dive, and could be fitted on existing aircraft. The RAF used them on Hurricanes in June 1942 against Rommel's tanks. The British Army had used rockets against low-flying bombers during the Battle of Britain by enlarging the tube from 2 inches (51 mm) to 3 inches (76 mm) and fitting high explosive warheads; it became an anti-tank weapon. The more powerful Hawker Typhoon, originally developed as a fighter, proved even more effective, carrying eight RP-3 60 lb (27 kg) rockets and producing a similar effect to a naval destroyer's broadside.

On 23 May 1943, a Fairey Swordfish destroyed U-752 in the Atlantic, and five days later, a Lockheed Hudson of RAF Coastal Command sank U-755 in the Mediterranean, using specialised rockets fitted with iron spikes which were fired at a shallow angle into the sea. Once under water, they curved upwards and punctured the pressure hull below the waterline, disabling or sinking the submarine.

Caltech developed the 5-inch (130 mm) High Velocity Aircraft Rocket (HVAR) with a 24-pound (11 kg) warhead for the US Navy. It was rushed to Europe for use on D-Day and later used by Navy aircraft in the Pacific. By January 1943, American pilots who had been flying in RAF Eagle Squadrons before the US entered the war, converted from Supermarine Spitfires to Republic P-47 Thunderbolts to form the USAAF 4th Air Fighter Group. At over 4 long tons (4.1 t) unladen, one of the biggest single engine fighter bombers of the war, it could carry ten 5-inch (130 mm) HVARs.

By late 1944, the RAF was able to hit stationary targets with greater accuracy from greater heights inflicting far more damage with less risk. On 12 November 1944, two 5-long-ton (5.1 t) Tallboy bombs were dropped by Avro Lancasters from 25,000 feet (7,600 m) and hit the German battleship Tirpitz at supersonic speeds, sinking it. The Tallboy was developed by Vickers designer Barnes Wallis who followed it up with the even larger 10-long-ton (10 t) Grand Slam earthquake bomb which was used to destroy railway viaducts and bridges, targets that could previously only be damaged in diving attacks. Wallis also designed a bomb that bounced across water to destroy the Eder and Moehne dams, which needed to be hit repeatedly at the same spot under water to be breached but had nets to protect against torpedoes.

Pilots in the Pacific later developed a technique of skip bombing which required flying at low level and dropping a spherically nosed conventional bomb onto the sea, at a shallow angle, which then bounced back into the air.

Although new aircraft could still dive towards their targets, they were no longer optimised for steep diving attacks. Through the pioneering efforts by the Luftwaffe's Fritz X and the USAAF's Azon, controlled-trajectory bombs evolved into today's smart bombs. A bomb can be dropped far from a target's air defences using a guidance system to hit the target, ensuring greater accuracy and minimising risk to the crew.

Jet engines allowed higher speeds which made "toss bombing" possible, a reverse dive bombing method where an aircraft snaps up from low altitude as a bomb is released, throwing it upwards like a shot put.

== See also ==
- Counter-insurgency aircraft

== Bibliography ==
- Angelucci, Enzo and Paolo Matricardi. World Aircraft: World War II. Volume II (Sampson Low Guides). Maidenhead, UK: Sampson Low, 1978. ISBN 0-562-00096-8.
- Brown, David. Warship Losses of World War II. Arms and Armour, London, Great Britain, 1990. ISBN 0-85368-802-8.
- Brown, David. Carrier Fighters. MacDonald and Janes, London, Great Britain, 1975. ISBN 0-356-08095-1.
- Casey, Louis. Naval Aircraft. Secaucus, New Jersey: Chartwell Books Inc. 1977. ISBN 0-7026-0025-3.
- Parshall, Jonathan; Tully, Anthony (2005). Shattered Sword: The Untold Story of the Battle of Midway. Dulles, Virginia: Potomac Books. ISBN 1-57488-923-0. Uses recently translated Japanese sources.
- Smith, Peter C. Dive Bomber!. Annapolis, Maryland: Naval Institute Press, 1982. ISBN 978-0-87021-930-6.
- Worth, Richard. Fleets of the World War II. New York: Da Capo Press, 2001. ISBN 978-0-306-81116-6.
