= List of World War II weapons of Hungary =

This is a list of World War II weapons of Hungary. Hungary mainly fought in World War II as part of the Axis forces on the Eastern Front but also took part in the Axis Invasion of Yugoslavia. In March 1944 Germany occupied Hungary and put in a puppet government after Hungary had been secretly negotiating a peace settlement with the United States and United Kingdom. Note that some Russian weapons would have been used by Hungary after they were captured during Operation Barbarossa.

== Small Arms ==
=== Rifles ===
- 35M rifle-Standard issue
- 31M rifle
- 43M rifle
- Mannlicher 88/90
- Mauser 1895
- K98k scoped

=== Sidearms ===
- FÉG 37M Pistol-Main service pistol
- Frommer 29M
- Frommer Stop

=== Machine guns ===
- Solothurn 31.M Golyószóró
- Schwarzlose Géppuska 07/31.M
- Madsen Könnyü Géppuska (Golyószóró) 24.M (1943 onward)
- Chauchat FM 15 Golyószóró (police and militia only)

=== Submachineguns ===
- Danuvia 39M
- Danuvia 43M
- Danuvia 44M
- SIG MKMS (very limited)
- MP 35
- MP 40
- MAB 38 (very limited)
- PPSh 41

=== Handheld Anti-tank ===
- Solothurn S-18/100
- 1944 M kézi panceltörö vetö

== Artillery ==
=== Anti-Tank Guns ===
- 3.7 cm Pak 36
- 4 cm 40.M panceltörö ágyú
- 47 mm F.R.C. Model 1931
- 5 cm Pak 38
- 7.5 cm Pak 97/38
- 7.5 cm Pak 40
- 8.8 cm Pak 43

=== Anti-Aircraft Guns ===
- 4 cm 36.M L/60 (had a 36/40.M variant which had a gun shield)
- 8 cm 29/38.M (Hungarian modified variant)
- 8 cm 29/44.M (Prototype)
- 8 cm 14.M AA gun
- 8.8 cm Flak 36
- Various German FlaK guns

=== Howitzers ===
- 10 cm 14.M and 14/A.M light howitzer
- 10.5 cm 37.M light howitzer (nicknamed "Göring-howitzer")
- 10.5 cm 40.M light howitzer (most were used as the main guns on the Zrínyi IIs)
- 10.5 cm 42.M light howitzer
- 15 cm 14.M and 14/35.M and 14/39.M medium howitzer
- 15 cm 31.M mechanised medium howitzer
- 21 cm 39.M and 40.M and 40/A.M heavy howitzer

=== Mountain Guns and Field Guns ===
- 7.5 cm 15.M and 15/31.M and 15/35.M mountain gun
- 8 cm 05/08.M field gun
- 8 cm 18.M and 18/22.M field gun (nicknamed "Böhler-gun")
- 10.5 cm 31.M mechanised heavy field gun

=== Mortars and Siege Guns ===
- 5 cm 39.M grenade launcher
- 81 mm 36.M and 36/39.M medium mortar
- 10.5 cm 40.M heavy mortar/smoke launcher
- 120 mm 43.M heavy mortar (Hungarian development of captured Soviet 120 mm mortar)
- 30.5 cm 16.M super-heavy siege howitzer/mortar
- 8 cm L/70 experimental anti-fortification gun (Prototype)

=== Rocket Artillery ===
- 44M Buzogányvető (had an anti-tank HEAT warhead and an anti-personnel HE warhead)
- 15 cm 43.M multiple rocket launcher

== Armoured Fighting Vehicles (AFVs) ==
=== Tankettes and Armoured Cars ===
- L3/33 / L3/35 (modified and used as 35M Ansaldo)
- 39M Csaba

=== Light Tanks ===
- 38M Toldi I / 38M Toldi II
- 42M Toldi IIA
- 43M Toldi III
- Panzer 38(t) (used as T-38)
- Hotchkiss H39

=== Medium Tanks ===
- 40M Turán I
- 41M Turán II
- 43M Turán III (Prototype)
- Panzer III (ausf. M)
- Panzer IV (ausf. F, G, H)
- Panzer V Panther
- SOMUA S35

=== Heavy Tanks ===
- Panzer VI Tiger I (ausf. E)
- 44M Tas (Prototype)

=== Tank Destroyers ===
- 43M Zrínyi II
- 44M Zrínyi I (Prototype)
- Toldi Páncélvadász (Prototype)
- Jagdpanzer 38 (t) Hetzer
- StuG III G
- Marder II

=== Self Propelled Anti Aircraft Guns (SPAAGs) ===
- 40M Nimród

== Aircraft ==
- MÁVAG Héja I (modified from the Re.2000)
- MÁVAG Héja II
- MÁVAG Héja II Zuhanóbombázó (dive bomber variant)
- Weiss Manfréd WM-16 Budapest
- Weiss Manfréd WM-21 Sólyom
- Weiss Manfréd WM-23 Ezüst Nyíl
- Varga RMI-1 X/H
- RMI-2 X/G
- RMI-3 Z/G
- RMI-6 Szúnyog
- RMI-7 V/G
- RMI-8 X/V [hu]
- RMI-9 M/G
- Repülőgépgyár Levente II
- Dunai Repülőgépgyár Me 210 Ca-1
- Dunai Repülőgépgyár Me 210 Ca-1 (40 mm)
- MÁVAG Bf 109 G (licence built by Hungary)
- Messerschmitt Bf 109 (supplied by Germany)
- Messerschmitt Bf 110
- Messerschmitt Me 410
- Focke-Wulf Fw 190 F-8
- Henschel Hs 129
- Dornier Do 215
- Junkers Ju 86
- Junkers Ju 87
- Junkers Ju 88
- Heinkel He 111
- Heinkel He 112
- Fiat CR.32
- Fiat CR.42 Falco
- Caproni Ca.135
- Caproni Ca.310
- Caproni Ca.314
- Fiat BR.20
- Dornier Do 23
- Heinkel He 45
- Heinkel He 46
- Heinkel He 70
- Focke-Wulf Fw 44
- Focke-Wulf Fw 58
- Focke-Wulf Fw 189
- Fieseler Fi 156
- Arado Ar 96
- Bücker Bü 131
- Bücker Bü 133
- Junkers Ju 52
- Messerschmitt Bf 108 Taifun
- IMAM Ro.37
- Breda Ba.25
- Nardi FN.305
- Savoia-Marchetti SM.75
