= List of Hungarian military equipment of World War II =

This is a list of World War II military equipment used by Hungary including Hungarian-designed and foreign-designed equipment.

== Combat vehicles ==
=== Armoured fighting vehicles ===
The vehicles below are all of Hungarian origin.

Model	Type	Number Produced	Armament
Straussler V-4/40	Light tank	4+	40 mm gun, 4 × 8 mm Gebauer MGs
39M Csaba	Armoured Car	102-137	20 mm gun, 8 mm Gebauer MG, 8 mm LMG
38M Toldi I (A20)	Light tank	80	20 mm gun, 8 mm Gebauer MG
42M Toldi II (B20)	Light tank	110	20 mm gun, 8 mm Gebauer MG
42M Toldi IIA (B40)	Light tank	80 – all converted from 42M Toldi II (B20)s	40 mm gun, 8 mm Gebauer MG
43M Toldi III (C40)	Light tank	12	40 mm gun, 8 mm Gebauer MG
Toldi Páncélvadász	Tank destroyer	1 prototype	75 mm gun, 8 mm LMG
Toldi II with 44M Buzogányvető rocket launchers	Rocket artillery	At least 1	2 × 44M Buzogányvető rocket launchers, possibly more armament
40M Nimród	SPAAG/Tank destroyer	135	40 mm autocannon
40M Turán I	Medium tank	285	40 mm gun, 2 × 8 mm Gebauer MGs
41M Turán II	Medium tank	139-195	75 mm gun, 2 × 8 mm Gebauer MGs
43M Turán III	Medium tank	1-2	75 mm gun, 2 × 8 mm Gebauer MGs
43M Zrínyi II	Assault gun	72	105 mm howitzer
44M Zrínyi I	Tank destroyer	1	75 mm gun, 6 × Nebelwerfer 41 rocket launchers were also mounted during testing
44M Tas	Heavy tank	2 prototypes (destroyed by bombing before they were completed)	80 mm gun, 1-2 × 8 mm Gebauer MGs

The vehicles below are foreign armoured fighting vehicles that Hungary used during WWII.

Model	Type	Origin	Number
Tiger I	Heavy tank	Germany	13-15
Panther	Medium tank	Germany	5-17
Panzer IV F, G, H	Medium tank	Germany	100+
Hetzer	Tank destroyer	Germany	75-101
StuG III G	Assault gun	Germany	50
Panzer III N, M	Medium tank	Germany	20-22
Marder II	Tank destroyer	Germany	5
Panzer 38(t)	Light tank	Czechoslovakia/Germany	105-111
Panzer I	Light tank	Germany	10
CV33/CV35	Tankette	Italy	60-150
Hotchkiss H39	Light tank/cavalry tank	France	15
SOMUA S35	Medium tank/cavalry tank	France	2

The vehicles below are captured foreign armoured fighting vehicles that Hungary captured (or acquired from Polish forces escaping to Hungary) during WWII.

Model	Type	Origin	Number
T-34 (76 and 85)	Medium tank	Soviet Union	10+
T-27	Tankette	Soviet Union	10
BA-6	Armoured Car	Soviet Union	4-6
BT-7	Light tank	Soviet Union	6
T-26	Light tank	Soviet Union	6
M3 Stuart	Light tank	United States (captured from the Soviet Union)	4
Valentine	Infantry tank	United Kingdom (captured from the Soviet Union)	1+
T-28	Medium tank	Soviet Union	1+
TKS	Tankette	Poland (acquired from Polish forces)	15-20
Renault R35	Light tank/infantry tank	France (acquired from Polish forces)	3

=== Aircraft ===
The aircraft below are all of Hungarian origin.

Model	Type	Number Produced	Armament
MÁVAG Héja II	Fighter	204	2 × 12.7 mm Gebauer MGs
Weiss Manfréd WM-21	Light bomber/reconnaissance	128	2 × 8 mm Gebauer MGs (forward firing), 1 × 7.92 mm Gebauer MG (rear gun), 120 kg of bombs including incendiary bombs
Repülőgépgyár Levente II	Trainer/liaison aircraft	86	none
Dunai Repülőgépgyár Me 210 Ca-1 (40 mm)	Fighter-bomber	Some sources say 4-5	1 × 40 mm Bofors autocannon, 2 × 20 mm MG 151 autocannons, 2 × 7.92 mm MG 17 MGs, 2 × 13 mm MG 131 MGs (rear armament), 6 × 150 mm rockets
Weiss Manfréd WM-23	Fighter	1 prototype	2 × 12.7 mm Gebauer MGs, 2 × 8 mm Gebauer MGs
MÁVAG Héja II Zuhanóbombázó	Dive bomber	3 converted from Héja II fighters	2 × 12.7 mm Gebauer MGs, 250 kg or 500 kg bombs
Varga RMI-1 X/H	Twin-engine turboprop fighter-bomber/reconnaissance	1 prototype	4 × 20 mm autocannons (forward firing), 1 × 8 mm MG and 2 × 13 mm MGs in remotely operated turrets (rear armament)
RMI-2 X/G	Twin-engine trainer for the RMI-1 X/H	1 prototype	none
RMI-3 Z/G	Dive bomber trainer	1 prototype	none
RMI-6 Szúnyog	Experimental aircraft	1	none
RMI-7 V/G	Trainer aircraft	1 prototype	none
RMI-8 X/V [hu]	Fighter/interceptor	1 prototype (destroyed before it was fully complete)	30 mm MK 108 autocannons, 8 mm Gebauer MGs, 13 mm MG 131 MGs, 20 mm MG 151 autocannons. Not perfectly clear which and how many guns it would have had.
RMI-9 M/G	Bf 109 pilot trainer	1 prototype	none

The aircraft below are foreign aircraft that Hungary used during WWII.

Model	Type	Origin	Number
Messerschmitt Me 210 Ca-1	Fighter-bomber	Germany/Hungary	179 (Hungarian built)
Messerschmitt Bf 109	Fighter	Germany	Around 700-800 Bf 109Gs built by Hungary
Messerschmitt Bf 110	Fighter-bomber	Germany	
Focke-Wulf Fw 190 F-8	Fighter-bomber	Germany	72
Junkers Ju 87	Dive bomber	Germany	
Fiat CR.32	Fighter	Italy	76-88 (modified)
Fiat CR.42	Fighter	Italy	70-72 (modified)
Junkers Ju 88	Medium bomber	Germany	
Junkers Ju 86	Medium bomber	Germany	66-72 (modified)
Heinkel He 112	Fighter	Germany	
Re.2000/MÁVAG Héja I	Fighter	Italy/Hungary	Around 70 (modified)
Dornier Do 215		Germany	11+
Messerschmitt Me 410	Fighter-bomber	Germany	
Caproni Ca.135	Medium bomber	Italy	68
Caproni Ca.310	Light bomber	Italy	36
Caproni Ca.314		Italy	
Dornier Do 23		Germany	
Fiat BR.20		Italy	
Heinkel He 45		Germany	
Heinkel He 46		Germany	
Heinkel He 111	Heavy bomber	Germany	7+
Henschel Hs 129	Ground attack aircraft	Germany	
Fieseler Fi 156		Germany	
Focke-Wulf Fw 189		Germany	
Heinkel He 70		Germany	18
IMAM Ro.37		Italy	
Arado Ar 96		Germany	
Breda Ba.25		Italy	
Bücker Bü 131		Germany	
Bücker Bü 133		Germany	
Focke-Wulf Fw 44		Germany	
Focke-Wulf Fw 58		Germany	
Nardi FN.305		Italy	
Junkers Ju 52	Transport aircraft	Germany	
Messerschmitt Bf 108 Taifun		Germany	7
Savoia-Marchetti SM.75		Italy	5

== Small arms ==
=== Handguns ===
The weaponry listed below was all used by the forces of Hungary

Image	Model	Manufacturer	Rounds per magazine	Cartridge	Introduced	Weight	Number produced
	FÉG 37M Pistol	FÉG	7	.380 ACP (Germans received the .32 ACP version)	1937	770 g	~250,000 (85,874 for Germany)
	Frommer 29M	FÉG	7	.380 ACP	1929	750g	50,000
	Frommer Stop	FÉG	8 7	.32 ACP.380 ACP	1914	580 g empty	350,000-360,000 (much fewer still in service)
	Rast and Gasser 1898	Rast and Gasser	8	8mm Gasser	1898	935g	A small number was used during the war
	Roth Steyr M1907	Steyr, FÉG	10	8mm Roth-Steyr	1907	1,030g	A limited number still in inventory by 1939

=== Rifles ===
The weaponry listed below was all used by the forces of Hungary

Images	Model	Manufacturer	Rounds per magazine	Cartridge	Introduced	Weight	Number used
	FÉG 35M	FÉG	5	8×56mmR	1935	4.02 kg	186,600
	31M	FÉG, Steyr	5	8x56mmR	1931	3.22 kg	~450,000
	M90/31	FÉG, Steyr	5	8x56mmR	1931	3.40 kg	included in 31M total
	FÉG 43M	FÉG	5(+1)	7.92x57	1943	4.1 kg	91,500
	M88/90	Steyr, FÉG	5	8x50mmR	1890s	4.41 kg	11,000
None converted M95 rifle Some parade pictures show Hungarian troops with what appear to be VZ. 24 rifles	“Mauser 1895“		5		1930s		100,000 reported in inventory in 1940. Likely just an inventory name for unconverted Mannlicher and Mauser rifles bought for training
	Kar98k	various	5(+1)	7.92x57	1942	3.7-4.1 kg	Limited use by snipers
	Berthier	various	3 or 5	8x50 lebel	1942	3.1-4.1 kg	Likely tens of thousands in inventory Only used by police and militia
	SVT 40	various	10	7.62x54 mmR	1941?	3.85kg	Captured

=== Submachine guns ===
Hungarian submachine guns
Images	Model	Manufacturer	Rounds per magazine	Cartridge	Introduced	Weight	Number produced
	Danuvia 39M (Király 39M)	Danuvia	40	9×25mm Mauser	1939	3.7 kg empty	3000-13,332
	Danuvia 43M (Király 43M)	Danuvia	40	9×25mm Mauser	1943	3.63 kg empty	8,000-20,000
	Danuvia 44M	Danuvia	40	9×19mm Parabellum	1944	2.92 kg empty	Only a few produced - mass production never started due to the Red Army invading Hungary in 1944

Foreign Submachine guns
Images	Model	Manufacturer	Rounds Per Magazine	Cartridge	Introduced	Weight	Number used
	Bergmann MP 35	Bergmann	24,32	9x19mm Parabellum	1937	4.24kg	1430 or 4430
	MP40	Steyr, Haenel, Erma Werke	32	9x19mm Parabellum	1940	3.97kg	5000
	SIG MKMS	SIG	30?	Unknown	~1938	4.25kg	At least 1 or a small number more
	MAB38	Beretta	10,20,30,40	9x19mm Parabellum	1943	3.25-4.2 kg	Limited
	PPSh 41	Various	35,71	7.62x25mm Tokarev	1941	3.63kg Without mag	Around thousands
	MP 34	steyr	20,32	9x19mm Parabellum	1941?	4.48kg (loaded)	Several thousand at most

=== Machine guns ===
Images	Model	Manufacturer	Rounds/Mag	Cartridge	Introduced	Weight	Number used
	Solothurn 31.M	FÉG, Danuvia	25	8×56mmR	1931	8.4kg	+13,000
	Solothurn 43.M	FÉG, Danuvia	30	7.92×57mm	1943	8.4kg	+13,000
	Madsen 24.M	DISA	32	7.92×57mm	1924-1930; 1943 (Reintroduced)	9.07kg	Unknown
	Schwarzlose	FÉG	250	8×56mmR	1912	41.4kg	20,000+
	Chauchat	Gladiator,SIDARME	20*	8x50 lebel	1942	9.1 kg	50,000 Used by police and militia only
	MG 34	various	50 round drums or 250 round belts	7.92x57mm	1941<	12.1 kg	Limited
	MG 42	various	5p round drums or 250 round belts	7.92x57mm	1942<	11.6 kg	Limited

== Artillery ==
Anti-Tank Guns
Model	Origin	Calibre	Penetration	Weight	Notes
3.7 cm Pak 36	Germany	37 mm	34 mm @ 100 m @ 30° 23 mm @ 1000 m @ 30°	327 kg 450 kg	
4 cm 40.M panceltörö ágyú	Hungary	40 mm	46 mm @ 100 m @ 30° 30 mm @ 1000 m @ 30°		A version of this gun was the main gun of the 40M Turán I medium tank
47 mm F.R.C. Model 1931	Belgium	47 mm		515 kg	Supplied by Germany, which captured them from Belgium
5 cm Pak 38	Germany	50 mm	69 mm @ 100 m @ 30° 48 mm @ 1000 m @ 30°	1,000 kg 1,062 kg	
7.5 cm Pak 97/38	Germany	75 mm	75 mm @ 100 m @ 30° 75 mm @ 1000 m @ 30°	1,190 kg 1,270 kg	
7.5 cm Pak 40	Germany	75 mm	108 mm @ 100 m @ 30° 80 mm @ 1000 m @ 30°	1,425 kg	
8.8 cm Pak 43	Germany	88 mm	203 mm @ 100 m @ 30° 165 mm @ 1000 m @ 30°	3,650 kg	

Anti-Aircraft Guns
Model	Type	Origin	Calibre	Range	Weight	Notes
4 cm 36.M L/60	Anti-aircraft autocannon	Sweden	40 mm	7,160 m	522 kg 822 kg	Had a 36/40.M variant with a gun shield. Gun of the 40M Nimród
8 cm 29.M	Anti-aircraft artillery	Sweden	80 mm	6-8,000 m vertical 10,000 m horizontal	4,200 kg	All were eventually upgraded to 29/38.M standard
8 cm 29/38.M	Anti-aircraft artillery	Sweden Hungary	80 mm	8-9,300 m vertical 14,900 m horizontal	3,309 kg 4,215 kg	Hungarian modification
8 cm 29/44.M	Anti-aircraft artillery	Hungary	80 mm	10,800 m vertical 18,500 m horizontal	3,260 kg	Prototype, a tank version of this was the main gun of the 44M Tas
8 cm 14.M	Anti-aircraft artillery	Austria-Hungary	76.5 mm	4,800 m vertical		AA gun version of 8 cm 05/08.M
8.8 cm Flak 36	Anti-aircraft artillery	Germany	88 mm			

Howitzers
Model	Type	Origin	Calibre	Range	Weight	Notes
10 cm 14.M	Light howitzer	Austria-Hungary	100 mm	8,000 m 8,870 m	1,417 kg 1,420 kg	Had a modified 14/A.M variant as well
10.5 cm 37.M	Light howitzer	Germany	105 mm			Nicknamed "Göring-howitzer"
10.5 cm 40.M	Light howitzer	Hungary	105 mm	10,400 m 10,760 m	1,600 kg	Most were used as the main guns on the Zrínyi IIs
10.5 cm 42.M	Light howitzer	Hungary	105 mm	11,250 m		
15 cm 14.M	Medium howitzer	Austria-Hungary	149.1 mm	8,000 m 10,690 m	2,765 kg 2,965 kg	Had a modified 14/35.M and 14/39.M variant as well
15 cm 31.M	Medium howitzer	Sweden	149.1 mm	14,600 m	5,595 kg	Mechanised artillery. Licence built
21 cm 39.M	Heavy howitzer	Italy	210 mm	15,400 m 16,000 m	15,021 kg 15,885 kg	Had a modified 40.M and 40/A.M variant as well

Mountain Guns and Field Guns
Model	Type	Origin	Calibre	Range	Weight	Notes
7.5 cm 15.M	Mountain gun	Austria-Hungary	75 mm	7,600 m	620 kg 670 kg	Had a modified 15/31.M and 15/35.M variant as well. Nicknamed "Hussar-gun"
8 cm 05/08.M	Field gun	Austria-Hungary	76.5 mm	9,300 m	1,065 kg	Had a 14.M AA gun version
8 cm 18.M	Field gun	Austria-Hungary	76.5 mm	8,400 m 10,500 m	1,478 kg	Nicknamed "Böhler-gun". Had a modified 18/22.M variant as well
10.5 cm 31.M	Heavy field gun	Sweden	105 mm	19,500 m	5,100 kg 5,995 kg	Mechanised artillery. Licence built. May have been Hungary's longest range gun

Mortars and Siege Guns
Model	Type	Origin	Calibre	Range	Weight	Notes
5 cm 39.M	Grenade launcher	Hungary	50 mm	50-850 m		Could fire 20-30 rounds per minute
81 mm 36.M	Medium mortar	Hungary	81.4 mm	4,300 m 6,200 m	85 kg	Had a modified 36/39.M variant as well. 20-25 rounds per minute
10.5 cm 40.M	Heavy mortar/smoke launcher	Germany	105 mm	6,350 m	800 kg	
120 mm 43.M	Heavy mortar	Hungary USSR	120 mm			Hungarian development of captured Soviet 120 mm mortar
30.5 cm 16.M	Super-heavy siege howitzer/mortar	Austria-Hungary	305 mm	11,250 m	~21,000 kg	
Model	Type	Origin	Calibre	Muzzle velocity	Penetration	Notes
8 cm L/70 réslövő ágyú	Anti-fortification gun	Hungary	80 mm	950 m/s	80 cm of concrete	Prototype/experimental gun made in 1942

Rocket Artillery
Model	Type	Origin	Calibre	Range	Weight	Notes
44M Buzogányvető	Anti-tank/anti-personnel rocket launcher	Hungary	100 mm 215 mm	2,000 m	29.2 kg	Had an anti-tank HEAT warhead with 300 mm of penetration and an anti-personnel HE warhead. Some mounted on Toldi light tanks
15 cm 43.M	Multiple rocket launcher	Germany	158 mm	6,900 m	510 kg 770 kg	510 kg = empty, 770 kg = loaded. Some mounted on Me 210 Ca-1 and Zrínyi I
