= List of military equipment of Germany's allies on the Eastern front =

This is a list of military equipment of Germany's allies on the Balkan and Russian fronts (1941–1945). Other weapons were used for training or national defense purposes in capitals and main cities.

This article presents a comprehensive list of equipment, including Western, Italian, and German weapons, in operational use on the Russian and Yugoslav fronts by pro-Axis countries received from these states. It also includes Russian armaments and certain Western equipment in use against Soviets at the Eastern Front.

== Finland ==
=== Aircraft ===
- VL Sääski I, II, III
- VL Kotka I, II
- VL Tuisku I, II
- VL Viima I, II
- VL Pyry I, II
- VL Myrsky I, II, III
- VL Pyörremyrsky
- VL Humu
- Arado Ar 196A-3
- Dornier Do 17Z-1
- Dornier Do 17Z-2
- Dornier Do 17Z-3
- Dornier Do 22Kl
- Fieseler Fi 156C Storch
- Focke-Wulf Fw 44C Stieglitz
- Focke-Wulf Fw 58C Weihe
- Heinkel He 115A-2
- Junkers F 13
- Junkers W 34
- Junkers K 43
- Junkers Ju 88A-4
- Messerschmitt Me/Bf 109G-2
- Messerschmitt Me/Bf 109G-6
- Messerschmitt Me/Bf 109G-8
- Aero A.32
- Letov Š-328
- Curtiss P-36A (Mohawk 75A)
- Curtiss P-40N-20 Warhawk
- Brewster F2A-1 (Mk.B-293) "Buffalo"
- Douglas DC-2 (C-32A) "Hanssin-Jukka"
- De Havilland Gypsy Moth
- De Havilland D.H. 86B
- Cessna UC-77C
- Fairchild UC-61K Forwarder
- Caudron C.714 C1 "Cyclone"
- Morane-Saulnier M.S.406 C1
- Morane-Saulnier M.S.410 C1
- Local M.S. 406/410 derivation "Mörkö-Morane"
- Hanriot H.232
- Avro 652A Anson Mk.1
- Blackburn Ripon IIF
- Bristol Bulldog Mk.II
- Bristol Bulldog Mk.IV A
- Bristol Blenheim Mk.I
- Bristol Blenheim Mk.IV
- Gloster Gauntlet Mk.II
- Gloster Gladiator Mk.II
- Hawker Hurricane Mk.I
- Hawker Hurricane Mk.IIc
- Fokker C.V.-D
- Fokker F.VIIa
- Fokker F.VIII
- Fokker C.X.
- Fokker D.XXI
- Koolhoven F.K.41
- Koolhoven F.K.52
- Fiat G.50bis
- Marinens Flyvebaatfabrikk M.F.11
- Svenska Aero Jaktfalken
- Beriev MBR-2
- Ilyushin DB-3F (Il-4)
- Lavochkin LaGG-3
- Petlyakov Pe-2
- Polikarpov U-2VS (Po-2)
- Polikarpov I-15biss (I-152)
- Polikarpov I-153
- Polikarpov I-16 Type 24
- Shavrov Sh-2
- Tupolev SB
- Tupolev SB-bis
- Polikarpov I-16 UTI-4

=== Armoured vehicles ===
- Renault FT
- Peerless armoured car
- Vickers 6-Ton
- Vickers-Armstrong Mk IV
- BA-3 Armored Car
- BA-6 Armored Car
- BA-10 Armored Car
- BA-20 Armored Car
- BA-20M Armored Car
- D-8 Armored Car
- FAI Armored Car
- FAI-M Armored Car
- Komsomolets Tractor
- T-26 (T26 Model 1931, T26 Model 1933, T-26 Model 1937, T26 model 1939, T26E, T26T, OT26)
- OT-64
- OT-130
- T-27
- T-28
- T-33
- T-34-76 Models 1941/42/43
- T-34-85
- T-37 (T-37A)
- T-38 (T-38M2) (T-38-34 & T-38-KV were T-38s similar to T-34 and KV tanks, a Finnish conversion for anti-tank training)
- T-40
- T-50
- BT-5
- BT-7 Models 1935,37
- KV-1 Models 1941,42
- StuG III Ausf. G (7.5 cm Sturmgeschütz 40 Ausf G Sd Kfz 142/1)
- Landsverk Anti II AA tank (40 ItK38)
- Landsverk 182 Armoured Car
- PzKpfw IV Ausf. J
- BT-42

=== Artillery ===
- 7.5 cm Pak 40
- 5 cm Pak 38
- Bofors 37 mm
- 25 mm Hotchkiss anti-tank gun
- 76 mm regimental gun M1927
- 76 mm divisional gun M1902
- 76 mm divisional gun M1902/30
- Canon de 105 mle 1913 Schneider
- 152 mm howitzer M1938 (M-10)
- Canon de 155 C modèle 1917 Schneider

== Italy ==
Main page: Italian Army equipment in World War II
There is only a reference to some aircraft in use in Africa, Eastern Front and other French and German aircraft received in the Italian Social Republic period; the armor and tanks were used in the Africa, Balkan and Italian areas.

=== Aircraft ===
- Hawker Hurricane Mk.I (Captured example from Balkan campaign)
- Bristol Beaufighter IF (Captured example from desert campaign)
- Breda Ba.201 "Pichiatelli"
- CANT Z.1007bis Alcione
- Caproni Ca.133
- Caproni Ca.310 Libeccio
- Fiat CR.32
- Macchi MC.200 Saetta
- Macchi MC.202 Folgore
- Savoia-Marchetti SM.79 Sparviero
- Savoia-Marchetti SM.81 Pipistrello
- Breguet 693 AB2
- Dewoitine D.520
- Lioret-et-Olivier LeO 451 B4
- Junkers Ju 87 B-2 "Bertha"
- Junkers Ju 87 B-2 Trop."Bertha"
- Junkers Ju 87 D-1 "Dora"
- Fieseler Fi 156 Storch
- Junkers Ju 52/3m g7e
- Junkers Ju 88A-4
- Messerschmitt Me Bf 110C-4
- Messerschmitt Me Bf 110G-4
- Messerschmitt Me Bf 109G-6
- Messerschmitt Me Bf 109G-10
- Messerschmitt Me Bf 109G-12
- Messerschmitt Me Bf 109K-4
- Dornier Do 217J-2

=== Armoured vehicles ===
- Autoblindo Lancia I.Z.
- Morris CS9 Armored car
- Autoblindo Fiat 611
- Autoblindo AB 40
- Autoblindo AB 41
- Autoblindo AB 43
- Autoblindo Lince
- Camionetta 42 Sahariana AS 42
- Semincingolato Breda Tipo 61
- Semicingolato Fiat 727
- Carro d'assalto Fiat 3000 - Model 1921/1930
- Carro Veloce 29
- Carro Veloce L.3, CV.33, CV.35 L.3/35Lf
- Carro Armato L.6/40, L.6/Lf, Centro Radio
- Carro Armato M.11/39
- Carro Armato M 13/40
- Carro Armato M 14/41
- Carro Armato M 15/42
- Renault R-35
- Somua S-35
- PzKpfw III Ausf N
- PzKpfw IV Ausf H
- PzKpfw VI Tigers
- StuG III Ausf G
- T-34/76mm (Only on eastern front)
- Semovente L40 da 47/32
- Semovente M40 da 75/18, M41 da 75/18, M42 da 75/18
- Carro Commando Per Reparto Semovente da 75/18
- Semovente M 42M da 75/34
- Semovente M 42L da 105/25
- Autocannoni da 75
- Breda Dovunque 90/53
- Breda Autocannone Blindato Tipo 102
- Autocannone da 90 - Lancia 3 RO Chassis

=== Artillery ===
- 81/14 Model 35 Mortar
- Breda 20/65 mod.35
- Cannone da 47/32
- Cannone da 65/17 modello 13
- Cannone da 75/27 modello 11
- Cannone da 75/27 modello 12
- Cannone da 75/32 modello 37
- 7.5 cm Pak 97/38
- Obice da 100/17 modello 14 & 16

== Slovakia ==
=== Aircraft ===
- Fieseler Fi 156 Storch
- Focke-Wulf Fw 44 Stieglitz
- Focke-Wulf Fw 58 Weihe
- Focke-Wulf Fw 189 Uhu A-1
- Gotha Go 145
- Heinkel He 72B-1 Kadett
- Heinkel He 111 H-3
- Junkers W 34h
- Junkers Ju 52/3m g7e
- Junkers Ju 87
- Klemm Kl 35D
- Messerschmitt Me/Bf 109E-7
- Messerschmitt Me/Bf 109G-6
- Siebel Si 204A
- Avia B-534.IV
- Avia B 71
- Aero A.100
- Letov Š-328
- Caudron C.445 Goeland
- Savoia-Marchetti SM.84bis

=== Armoured vehicles ===
- Škoda OA vz.27 Armoured car
- Tatra OA vz.30 Armoured car
- ČKD Praga T-33 tankette (Tančik vz. 33)
- ČKD Praga LT vz.34
- Škoda LT vz.35
- ČKD Praga THNPS1 a.k.a. LT vz.38/BMM PzKpfw 38(t) Ausf. A, G, S
- ČKD Praga LLT (LT vz.40)
- Panzerjaeger 38(t) fuer 7.62 cm PaK36(r) Sd.Kfz. 139 (Marder III)
- Panzerkampfwagen II Ausf c, A, B und C Sd.Kfz. 121 (Panzer IIc)
- Panzerkampfwagen III Ausf N Sd.Kfz. 141/2 (Panzer III N)
- Škoda MTH (Leichter Raupenschlepper MTH)
- ČKD Praga III (Leichter Raupenschlepper T-III (t))
- ČKD Praga IV (Mittlerer Raupenschlepper T-IV (t))
- ČKD Praga TH (Praga T 6)
- ČKD Praga T9 (Praga TH 6)

=== Artillery ===
- Canon de 75 modèle 1897
- 3,7cm KPÚV vz. 34
- 3,7cm KPÚV vz. 37
- Skoda houfnice vz 14/19
- Skoda 75 mm Model 15
- Skoda 100 mm Model 16/19
- 10 cm houfnice vz. 30
- 10.5 cm hruby kanon vz. 35
- 10.5 cm leFH 18
- 15 cm hrubá houfnice vz. 25
- 2 cm VKPL vz. 36
- 8.35 cm PL kanon vz. 22
- 8.8 cm Flak 18/36/37/41

== Hungary ==
=== Aircraft ===
- Manfred Weiss WM-16 Budapest I/II
- Manfred Weiss WM-21 Solyom
- Repülőgépgyár Levente II
- D.A.F. Me 210C-1/Ca-1 (Messerschmitt Me 210C under license)
- MÁVAG 109G-2,6,14 (Me/Bf 109 under license)
- MÁVAG Heja I (Modified Caproni-Reggiane Re 2000 under license)
- MÁVAG Heja II (Based on the Caproni-Reggiane Re 2000)
- PIRT 52 (Junkers Ju 52 under license)
- Arado Ar 79
- Arado Ar 96B-5
- Dornier Do 215B-4
- Fieseler Fi 156C-2 Storch
- Focke-Wulf Fw 56 Stosser
- Focke-Wulf Fw 58C Weihe
- Focke-Wulf Fw 189A-0 Uhu
- Focke-Wulf Fw 190 F-3 Wurger
- Heinkel He 45C
- Heinkel He 46C-1
- Heinkel He 111 H
- Heinkel He 111 P-6
- Heinkel He 112B-1
- Heinkel He 170A
- Junkers Ju 52/3m g7e
- Junkers Ju 86 K-2
- Junkers Ju 87B-2 Bertha
- Junkers Ju 87D-1 Dora
- Junkers Ju 87D-5 Dora
- Junkers Ju 88A-4
- Junkers Ju 88D-1
- Klemm L 25D
- Klemm Kl 31
- Klemm Kl 35D
- Messerschmitt Me/Bf 108B Taifun
- Messerschmitt Me/Bf 109D-1
- Messerschmitt Me/Bf 109F-4
- Messerschmitt Me/Bf 109G-2
- Messerschmitt Me/Bf 109G-4
- Messerschmitt Me/Bf 110G-4
- Siebel Si 202 Hummel
- Avia B-534.IV.
- Potez 63.11
- Fokker C.V.-D
- Fokker D.XVII
- Breda Ba 65
- Caproni Ca.101
- Caproni Ca.135 P.XI. (Ca.135bis)
- Caproni Ca.310 Libeccio
- Caproni-Reggiane Re.2000 Serie I Falco I
- Fiat CR.20
- Fiat CR.20bis
- Fiat CR.30
- Fiat C.R.32bis
- Fiat C.R.42AS Falco
- Fiat G.12T
- Meridionali Ro.37bis
- Nardi F.N.305
- Savoia-Marchetti SM.75 Marsupiale

=== Armoured vehicles ===
- Armoured car Tatra Koprivnice T-72 (OA vz.30)
- BT Tanks (captured from Soviets on Eastern Front)
- 39M Csaba Armoured Scout Car
- Straussler V-4
- Skoda S-II-c (T-21 Prototype)
- 40M Turán I and 41M Turán II
- 43M Turán III
- 44M Tas
- 43M Zrínyi II Assault Gun
- 44M Zrínyi I Tank Destroyer
- Toldi I, II, IIA, III Light Tanks
- Toldi Pancelvadasz Tank Destroyer
- 40M Nimród (40M Nimród legvedelmi harckocsi) (SPAAG)
- LT vz.35
- PzKpfw 38 (t) (T-38)
- PzKpfw III (Ausf. M, N)
- PzKpfw IV (Ausf. D, F1, F2, G, H)
- StuG III Ausf. G 7.5 cm Sturmgeschütz 40 Ausf G Sd Kfz 142/1
- PzKpfw I
- Ansaldo CV33
- Gerät 555, Pz Jag Wg 638/10, Pz Jag 38(t) (Hetzer)
- Jagdpanzer 38(t) Hetzer (Panzerjäger 38(t)) for 7.5 cm PaK39)
- PzKpfw VI Tiger I Ausf. E (retained German Markings)
- American M3 Stuart Light Tank (captured from Soviets on Eastern Front)
- T-34/76 (captured from Soviets on Eastern Front)
- T-27 Soviet Tank (captured from Soviets on Eastern Front)
- BA-20 Soviet Armoured Car (captured from Soviets on Eastern Front)

=== Artillery ===
- 3.7 cm PaK 36 (36.M)
- 4 cm 40.M light anti-tank gun
- 5 cm PaK 38 (38.M)
- 7.5 cm PaK 40 (40.M)
- 8.8 cm PaK 43
- 4 cm 36.M L/60 Bofors anti-aircraft cannon
- 8 cm 29/38.M (Bofors 80 mm AA gun)
- 8.8 cm FlaK 36
- 8 cm 5/8M field gun
- 10 cm 14/a. M field howitzer
- 10.5 cm 37.M light howitzer
- 10.5 cm 40.M light howitzer
- 10.5 cm 42.M light howitzer
- 10.5 cm 31.M heavy field gun
- 15 cm 31.M howitzer
- 15 cm Nebelwerfer 41 (15 cm 43.M)
- 44M Buzogányvető (anti-tank and anti-personnel rocket launcher)
- 21 cm 39.M heavy howitzer (licence built with modifications as 40.M and 41.M)
- 30.5 cm 16.M super-heavy siege howitzer/mortar

== Romania ==
=== Aircraft ===
- Interprindere Pentru Contrucţii Aeronautice Române ICAR 36 (prototype, with Messerschmitt license)
- Industria Aeronautică Română IAR 36 (definitive design)
- IAR 37
- IAR 38
- IAR 39
- IAR 79
- IAR 80
- IAR 80A
- IAR 81
- IAR 81A
- IAR 81B
- IAR 81C
- SET 7
- Lublin R-XIIID
- PWS-26
- PZL P.7a
- PZL P.11 B, C, F ( F version built under licence at I.A.R.)
- PZL.23 Karaś B
- PZL P.24F (version built under licence at I.A.R.)
- PZL.37 Łoś A and B variants
- RWD-8
- RWD-13
- RWD-14 Czapla
- Avia BH-25J
- Arado Ar 96B-5
- Arado Ar 196A-3 (delivery unconfirmed)
- Bücker Bü 131B Jungmann
- Fieseler Fi 156C Storch (built under licence at I.C.A.R.)
- Focke-Wulf Fw 44 Stieglitz
- Focke-Wulf Fw 58C Weihe
- Focke-Wulf Fw 190 A (Captured most probably F version)
- Gotha Go 242A-1
- Heinkel He 111 H-3 H-6
- Heinkel He 112B-2
- Heinkel He 114A-2
- Henschel Hs 129B2
- Junkers W 34h
- Junkers Ju 52/3m g7e
- Junkers Ju 87D-3 Dora
- Junkers Ju 87D-5 Dora
- Junkers Ju 88A-4
- Junkers Ju 88D-1
- Klemm Kl 35D
- Klemm Kl 25
- Messerschmitt Me/Bf 108B Taifun
- Messerschmitt Me/Bf 109E-3 E-7 (E-7 were refurbished E-3 airframes)
- Messerschmitt Me/Bf 109G-2
- Messerschmitt Me/Bf 109G-4
- Messerschmitt Me/Bf 109G-6
- Lockheed P-38 Lightning (Captured example)
- American Consolidated B-24D (Captured example)
- Bloch 210 BN5
- Potez 543
- Potez 633 B2
- Potez 63.11
- Potez 65
- Bristol Blenheim Mk.I
- Hawker Hurricane Mk.I
- Nardi FN.305
- Savoia-Marchetti SM.62bis
- Savoia-Marchetti SM.79B Sparviero
- Savoia-Marchetti SM.79JR Sparviero
- CANT Z.501 Gabbiano
- Polikarpov U-2VS (Po-2) (Captured examples)
- Polikarpov I-16 Type 24 (Captured examples)
- MiG-3 (Captured examples)

=== Armoured vehicles ===
- AB Md. 41
- Renault FT
- Şeniletă Malaxa Tip UE
- Șenileta Ford rusesc de captură
- T-1 tractor
- R-1
- Renault R-35
- PzKpfw 38(t)
- PzKpfw III
- PzKpfw IV
- StuG III G
- Vânătorul de care R35
- TACAM T-60
- TACAM R-2
- CKD Praga TH, Praga T6, T-VI-R (Praga T 6.)
- Mareşal tank destroyer/Support Gun
- Goliath Armoured vehicle
- I.A.R. 22 - Prime Mover
- PSW 222
- SPW 250/1
- SPW 251/1
- FAMO F3 Model 1939
- Gepanzerter Zugkraftwagen 8t (Sd Kfz 7)
- Skoda PA-III (OA vz.27) Armoured Car
- Tatra Koprivnice T-72 (OA vz.30)
- CKD Praga TNSPE
- Autoblindo Armored Car

=== Artillery ===
- Bofors 37 mm anti-tank gun
- 3.7 cm Pak 36
- Romanian 47 mm Schneider-Concordia At Cannon
- Cannone da 47/32
- Canon de 75 modèle 1897
- 7.5 cm Pak 40
- 7.5 cm Pak 97/38
- Skoda 75 mm Model 1928
- 75 mm Reșița Model 1943
- 100mm Skoda houfnice vz 14
- Canon de 105 L mle 1936 Schneider
- Škoda 149 mm K series
- 25 mm Hotchkiss anti-tank gun
- 25 mm Hotchkiss anti-aircraft gun
- Hotchkiss AA-At 37 mm single gun
- Hotchkiss AA-At 37 mm double gun

== Independent State of Croatia ==
=== Aircraft ===
- Ikarus IK-2
- Rogozarski Fizir
- Rogozarski PVT
- Dornier Do 17E-1
- Dornier Do 17K
- Dornier Do 17Z-2
- Fieseler Fi 156 Storch
- Focke-Wulf Fw 58 Weihe
- Junkers W 34h
- Junkers Ju 52/3m g7e
- Junkers Ju 87D (15+, some units belonged in 1.(kroat) staffeln/Stab SG.9)
- Messerschmitt Me/Bf 108 Taifun
- Messerschmitt Me/Bf 109E
- Messerschmitt Me/Bf 109F
- Messerschmitt Me/Bf 109G-2
- Messerschmitt Me/Bf 109G-6
- Messerschmitt Me/Bf 109G-10
- Messerschmitt Me/Bf 110
- Avia B-534.IV
- Bloch 100
- Breguet XIX B.2
- Bristol Blenheim I
- Hawker Hurricane Mk.I
- CANT Z.1007bis Alcione
- Caproni Ca.310 Libeccio
- Caproni Ca.311 Libeccio
- Caproni Ca.312 Libeccio
- Fiat BR.20 Cicogna
- Fiat G.50bis Freccia
- Macchi C.202 Folgore
- Macchi C.205 Veltro
- SAIMAN 200
- SAIMAN 202
- Savoia-Marchetti SM.79K Sparviero

=== Armoured vehicles ===
- Renault FT
- Tankette TK3
- ADGZ Armored Car
- wz.34 Armored Car
- CV33/35
- Panzer III ausf. N
- Panzer IV ausf. F1
- Panzer IV ausf. G
- Panzer VI
- Matilda II (Captured on eastern front)
- Sd.Kfz. 251 armored half-track
- Armored Train with Somua S-35 turrets.

== Bulgaria ==
=== Aircraft ===
- Darjavna Aeroplana Rabotlinitza D.A.R.3a (LAZ-3a) (LAZ: Prefix of Prof. Lazarev, its designer)
- D.A.R.6 Sinigier
- D.A.R. 10F
- Kazalnuk-Caproni Bulgara Societa Anonima Ka.B.3 Tchoutchouliga (Caproni Ca.113 under license)
- Bulgarski Caproni KB-4
- Bulgarski Caproni KB-11
- Avia B-534.IV
- Avia B-135
- Avia B.122
- Avia B 71
- Aero A.304
- Letov Š-328
- Avia MB.200
- Arado 196A-3
- Dornier Do 11D
- Dornier Do 17P
- Dornier Do 17M
- Dornier Do 17Ka-1
- Fieseler Fi 156C Storch
- Focke-Wulf Fw 44C Stieglitz
- Focke-Wulf Fw 58 Weihe
- Focke-Wulf Fw 189A-2
- Heinkel He 42C-2
- Heinkel He 45C
- Heinkel He 46C-1
- Junkers Ju 52/3m g7e
- Junkers Ju 87R-2 Richard
- Junkers Ju 87R-4 Richard
- Junkers Ju 87D-5 Dora
- Messerschmitt Me/Bf 108B Taifun
- Messerschmitt Me/Bf 109E-4
- Messerschmitt Me/Bf 109G-2
- Messerschmitt Me/Bf 109G-4
- Messerschmitt Me/Bf 109G-6
- Messerschmitt Me/Bf 109G-10
- Bloch 210 BN5
- Dewoitine D.520
- Lioret-et-Olivier LeO H-246.1
- PZL P.23B Karas B
- PZL P.24F

=== Armoured vehicles ===
- Carro Veloce CV 33
- Vickers 6-ton tank Mk. E Alternative B
- CKD T-11 (LT vz. 35)
- Renault R-35
- Gerät 81 Leichter Panzerspähwagen (2 cm) Sd Kfz. 222
- Gerät 82 Leichter Panzerspähwagen (Fu) Sd Kfz 223
- PzKpfw. IV Ausf. G
- Panzerkampfwagen IV Ausf G Sd Kfz 161/1 und 161/2 (Maybach T-IV)
- StuG III Ausf. G 7.5 cm Sturmgeschütz 40 Ausf G Sd Kfz 142/1 (Samochodno Oryzie 75)
- PzKpfw. 38(t)
- Hotchkiss H-39
- Somua S-35
- BMW R-12 motorcycles
- AWO motorcycles
- Truck Horch
- Praga AV
- Volkswagen Kubel
- Opel Blitz
- RSO
- Gepanzerter Zugkraftwagen 8t (Sd Kfz 7)
- Hetzer
- Turan I
- Semovente L40 da 47/32
- 105 mm StuG armor
- German PzKpfw V Panther A, D, G
- Steyr 640 Truck
- Jagdpanzer IV

== Spain ==
=== Aircraft ===
- Hispano-Suiza HA-132-L "Chirri"
- Arado Ar 95A-1
- Arado Ar 96A (opered by volunteers in Eastern Front)
- Bücker Bü 131B Jungmann
- Bücker Bü 133C Jungmeister
- Dornier Do 16J Wal
- Dornier Do 16R Super-Wal
- Dornier Do 17F
- Dornier Do 17P
- Dornier Do 24T-3
- Fieseler Fi 156 Storch
- Focke-Wulf Fw 56 (used by volunteers in Eastern Front)
- Focke-Wulf Fw 190 (used by volunteers in Eastern Front and Germany)
- Gotha Go 145C
- Heinkel He 45 (opered by volunteers in Eastern Front)
- Heinkel He 46C-1
- Heinkel He 51B-1
- Heinkel He 59B-2
- Heinkel He 60
- Heinkel He 70F-2
- Heinkel He 111 B, E, H
- Heinkel He 112 B-0
- Heinkel He 114A-2
- Henschel Hs 123A-1 (included at volunteers in Eastern Front)
- Henschel Hs 126A-1
- Junkers Ju 87A/B (opered by Condor Legion)
- Junkers Ju 52/3m g3e (also manufactured by license for CASA)
- Junkers Ju 88A-4
- Klemm Kl 35 (managed by volunteers in Eastern Front)
- Messerschmitt Me/Bf 109D-1
- Messerschmitt Me/Bf 109E (included at volunteers in Eastern Front and local use in Spain)
- Messerschmitt Me/Bf 109F (included at volunteers in Eastern Front and local use in Spain)
- Messerschmitt Me/Bf 109G (only operated by volunteers in Eastern Front)
- CANT Z.501 Gabbiano
- Fiat CR.32bis
- Fiat BR.20M Cicogna
- Fiat G.50 Freccia
- Meridionali Ro.37bis
- Meridionali Ro.43
- Savoia-Marchetti SM.62
- Savoia-Marchetti SM.79 Sparviero
- Savoia-Marchetti SM.81 Pipistrello
- Polikarpov I-15bis (I-152)
- Polikarpov I-16 24 Type
- Polikarpov R-5
- Tupolev SB-2
- Letov Š-328
- Aero A.100
- Boeing P-26A Model 281
- Douglas DC-1
- Fairchild 91 "Baby Clipper"
- Grumman FF-2 (Model GE-23 "Delfin")
- Northrop (Canadian Vickers) Delta Mk II
- Vultee V-1A
- Bleriot SPAD S.510
- Bloch 210 BN5
- Breguet XIX B.2
- Dewoitine D.376
- Dewoitine D.510
- Potez 540
- Airspeed A.S.Envoy III
- Hawker Fury Mk.II
- Hawker Osprey IV
- Vickers Vildebeest IV
- Fokker F.VIIb-3m
- Fokker F.VII-3m/B
- Fokker F.XVIII
- Koolhoven F.K.51
- Koolhoven F.K.52
- Nieuport-Delage Ni-D.622 C1
- Loire 46 C1.
- Potez 540
- Potez 543

=== Armoured vehicles ===
- Fiat 3000
- PzKpfw IV Ausf. G
- PzKpfw IV Ausf. H
- StuG IIIG
- Renault FT
- Camion Protegido Car 1921
- 1921 Schneider CA-1
- Hispano-Suiza Armored Truck
- 1923 Saint Chamond Wheel cum Track
- Tank Trubia
- Tank Trubia A4
- Oteyza 1935 Armored Car
- Verdeja (tank)
- Citroën-Kegresse P16 Model 29
- Vickers Carden Loyd Tankette
- Bilbao Armored Car
- Vickers E Type, 6 Ton Tank
- 1908 RMM (Rheinmetall)
- Hotchkiss 1908

=== Artillery ===
- 8 cm Granatwerfer 34
- 3.7 cm Pak 36
- 5 cm Pak 38
- 7.5 cm Pak 40
- 10.5 cm leFH 18M
- 15 cm sFH 18
- Canon de 155 mm GPF
- 220 mm TR mle 1915/1916 (Captured)

== See also ==
- German designations of foreign artillery in World War II
- German designations of foreign firearms in World War II
