= Panzer VI =

Panzer VI can refer to three different German tanks:

- Krupp PzKpfw NbFz VI, one of the Neubaufahrzeug prototype tanks
- Panzer VIE, or Tiger I
- Panzer VIB, or Tiger II
