= 44M Tas =

Hungarian heavy/medium tank of WWII

- 1:10 metal factory mockup of the 44M Tas (1944).
- Type: Medium / Heavy tank
- Place of origin: Kingdom of Hungary

Service history
- Used by: Kingdom of Hungary
- Wars: World War II

Production history
- Designer: Weiss Manfréd Works
- Designed: 1943
- Manufacturer: Weiss Manfréd Works
- Produced: 1943–1944
- No. built: 2 prototypes (unfinished)

Specifications
- Mass: 38 tonnes (37 long tons; 42 short tons)
- Length: 9.2 m (30 ft 2 in) gun forward
- Width: 3.5 m (11 ft 6 in)
- Height: 3 m (9 ft 10 in)
- Crew: 5 (commander, gunner, loader, driver, radio operator)
- Armor: 20–120 mm (0.79–4.72 in)
- Main armament: Intended production armament: 1 × 80 mm 29/44M L/58 tank gun Prototype armament: 1 × 7.5 cm 43.M tank gun
- Secondary armament: 2 × 8 mm Gebauer 1934/40A M machine gun
- Engine: 2 × 8 cylinder gasoline Weiss Manfréd Z-V8H-4; 2 × 260 hp (2 × 195 kW) for a total of 520 hp (390 kW)
- Power/weight: 13.68 hp/ton
- Suspension: two-wheel leaf spring bogies with shock absorbers
- Operational range: 200 km (120 mi)
- Maximum speed: 45 km/h (28 mph)

The 44M Tas was a Hungarian heavy tank/medium tank design of World War II. It was developed to combat heavily armored Soviet tanks encountered on the Eastern Front and to replace the older Turán I and Turán II tanks which Hungary operated, modernising Hungary's armoured forces. The Tas somewhat resembled the German Panther tank in terms of both looks and capabilities. It was to be well armored – up to 120 mm thick and with sloped armor. The main armament would likely have been a Hungarian built heavily modified anti-tank version of the 80 mm Bofors AA gun. The only prototypes built were destroyed when the Americans bombed the Weiss Manfréd factory in July 1944.

== Development and Design ==
=== History ===
By 1943, Hungarian tank production was becoming obsolete and was struggling against the more modern Soviet tanks. To solve this problem, Hungary started to develop the Turán III and Zrínyi assault guns. However, it still tried to buy the license of foreign vehicles, the Panzerkampfwagen IV Ausführung H and the Panzerkampfwagen V "Panther" to be exact, but Germany rigidly refused to sell the blueprints. Hungary had no other option but to design its own modern heavy tank. In April 1943 the Ministry of Defense (HM) charged the Manfred Weiss factory to design the vehicle.

In the same year, a group of military experts of the Institute of Military Technology of the Hungarian Army (HTI) traveled to Kummersdorf, Germany, where they saw the famous Tiger and Panther tanks. Unfortunately for the Hungarians, the tanks were not shown to them from the inside. However, because they were the only Hungarians who saw the modern German vehicles from up close in the given year, 3 HTI specialist officers took part in the designing procedures from the beginning.

The blueprints with all necessary data and budget plans were finished on 3 December 1943. Photos of the 1:10 scale metal mockup of the new vehicle were given to the HTI on 6 December 1943. The vehicle looked very similar to the German Panther but the designers used the steep slope angle of the Soviet T-34's frontal armor. The new heavy tank was named Tas in honor of one of the Seven Chieftains of the Magyars (Hungarians), the HM accepted the plans, development and production started in May 1944.

Construction of the prototype vehicle progressed slowly because it was the first entirely domestic tank project of Hungary so it was still in its infancy. The engineers constantly discovered newer and newer problems which needed solutions. Furthermore, the tank had welded armor which was a new method for the engineers. The Toldi light tanks had welded armor too but that tank had very thin armor plates. The Tas had 75 and 120 mm thick armor plates which proved to be a challenge for the engineers. Constant material shortages and Allied bombing raids did not help either.

The chassis of the Tas' iron made sample vehicle was ready in June 1944 with fully operational suspensions and built-in engines, and the turret's construction readiness came to a raw binding state. However, on 27 July 1944 an Allied bombing raid seriously damaged the Manfred Weiss factory. The production hall where the Tas was made collapsed and the sample vehicle completely burned out. Hungary tried to restart the project at Ganz factory but it did not have enough time to actually start the re-building of the prototype. Not much progress was made on restarting the Tas project before the Soviets would invade Hungary and political turmoil involving the German occupation of Hungary and the installation of a puppet government would crush all hope to finish the project.

=== Suspension, Engine and Mobility ===
The suspension of the Tas was a native design and it used 3 two wheel bogies with leaf springs and shock absorbers. It would have 6 medium sized road wheels, a drive wheel at the front and an idler wheel at the rear, with 5 return rollers above the road wheels. The same setup would be found on the other side. This would likely result in a smooth ride for the vehicle and its crew and a more stable platform for firing on the move.

When it came to propulsion, Hungary didn’t have many engines to choose from. Building a new V12 engine for the tank, with at least 700 hp, was originally considered but unlike with more industrialised powers, this option was not very likely for Hungary as it would have taken too much time, resources and capacity, to design and build a powerful new engine. Instead, it was decided that the Tas would be powered by two Weiss Manfréd Z-V8H-4 gasoline 8 cylinder engines from the Turán I/II (as both used the same engine). Each engine provided 260 hp (195 kW) for a total of 520 hp (390 kW). This choice had the benefits of using already tested engines in production and there were available spare parts for this engine, unlike with a new engine, which would also take a long time to develop, switch to producing and would not be compatible with other Hungarian tanks.

However, for a tank that would weigh 38 tonnes, 520 hp would result in only a little over 13.68 hp/tonne, which is somewhat underpowered. It was estimated this would give the Tas a top speed of 45 km/h and an operational range of 200 km. The actual mobility of the Tas may have been a little worse though, as when using two engines together to power one gearbox, some power is usually lost. Although it is still possible that the Tas could achieve these figures.

=== Armor, Hull and Turret Design ===
The hull of the Tas looked similar to that of the Panther’s hull, but with notable differences such as a frontal mid plate and angled corners joining the upper front plate to the upper sides of the hull. A drawing of the hull armor thicknesses survived and according to it, the front of the hull of the Tas would have a heavily sloped 75 mm thick upper front plate, a 100/120 mm thick mid plate at a slight slope and a heavily sloped 75 mm thick lower plate. The Tas had sloped, angled corners of the upper front plate, but their thicknesses are unknown, although some estimate them to be 50 mm. The sides of the hull were protected by 50 mm of sloped armor above the tracks and 50 mm vertical armor behind the tracks. The upper section of the rear of the hull would be 100 mm thick with a slight slope and the lower section of the rear would be 50/75 mm at a decent slope. The belly and deck (underside and top of the hull) were 20 mm thick. Since the hull was welded and had thick, angled armor, the Tas was well protected – its armor was as effective if not more effective than the German Panther's.

Many sources list the maximum armor thickness as 120 mm, so this seems to be the correct thickness for the mid front plate, and it may have been increased from the original 100 mm, or there may be contradicting information.

Not as much is known about the turret armor as mostly only written documents survived. However, the armor thickness seems to be 100 mm all around. The turret had a somewhat octagonal shape with a large, wide and curved gun mantlet, like that of the Panther A/D, but a bit larger. It is possible that the front of the turret would be 200 mm thick in total as the mantlet thickness is said to be 100 mm thick as well. On top of the turret was a cupola with a hatch for the commander and another hatch for the gunner.

=== Armament ===
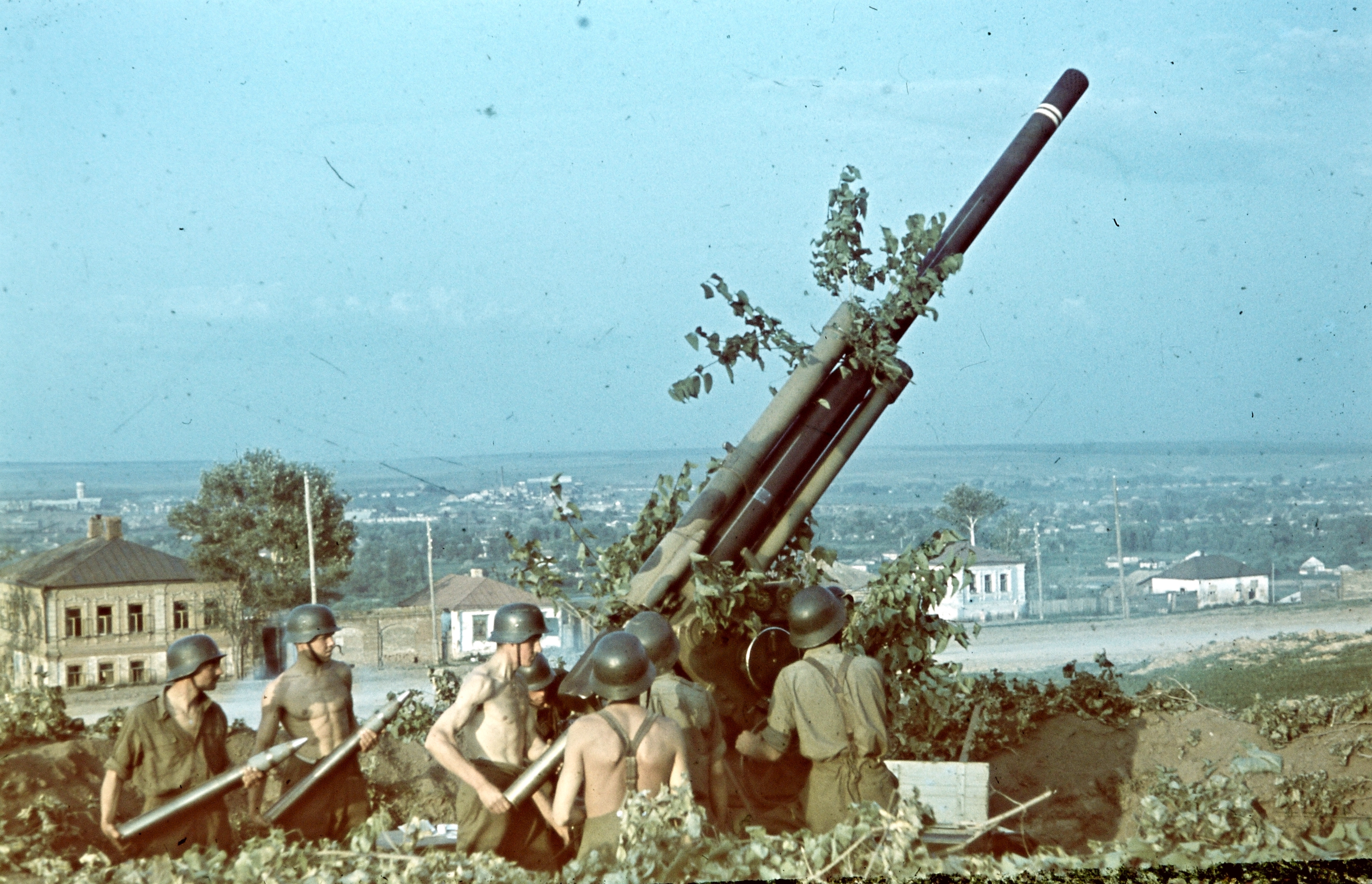
Hungarian soldiers manning an 80 mm 29/38M AA gun, USSR, 1942. A heavily modified version of this would have been the main gun of the 44M Tas.

According to the original plans and the 1:10 scale mockup the Tas would have an 80 mm gun. In 1943 when the blueprints were made Hungary had only one such gun, the 80 mm 29/38.M AA gun. It is not known if the conversion of the gun from an AA cannon to a tank gun actually started, but it is known that there was a converted tank gun prototype of the same gun which was made in 1942. Perhaps the engineers planned to use that or waited for an actual converted tank gun.

The main armament of the Tas was the 80 mm (3.15 in) 29/44M L/58 gun. Developed by DIMÁVAG, it was a heavily modified, license produced version of the Bofors 80 mm anti-aircraft gun which the Hungarians used as the 80 mm 29M anti-air gun and later modified into the 80 mm 29/38M L/48 anti-air gun. The Tas' 1:10 scale mockup was modelled with the 29/44M L/58 gun. The first prototype of the 29/44M gun was ready in October 1943 but its first firing trials pointed out some serious flaws. Due to this, it was estimated that the mass production of this gun could not start earlier than the summer of 1944, therefore a temporary armament for the Tas prototypes had to be chosen. This is why the designers decided to use a 75 mm gun – the 7.5 cm 43.M tank gun for the prototypes. This is the same 75 mm gun which was used in the Turán III and the Zrínyi I. The 7.5 cm 43.M gun already had 2 finished models so the production of the gun would go more smoothly than waiting for the 80 mm tank gun to be produced. With the 75 mm cannon, the finished sample vehicle made of iron could be tested in the field and later could be easily modified to build in the 80 mm gun which was predicted to be ready by the time a serial vehicle made of armor plates would be finished.

Both guns had gun depression and elevation angles of -9° and +20° respectively.

However, due to material shortage, the third 75 mm gun was never finished by the time the Tas prototypes were destroyed by Allied bombing and the DIMÁVAG factory which produced the gun was later captured by the Soviets.

The 7.5 cm 43.M tank gun was powerful enough to reliably destroy most Soviet tanks from range such as the T-34, T-34/85, KV-1s and Soviet Tank destroyers, but would likely have struggled against the thick armor of the newest Soviet heavy tank on the front – the IS-2. It could still penetrate the lower front plate and the sides of the IS-2 from medium range. As for the planned 80 mm tank gun, it would have likely performed better than the 75 mm gun, as the Hungarians would not have bothered trying to make it the main armament of the Tas, if it would not be an improvement over the 75 mm gun.

The secondary armament of the Tas consisted of a coaxial machine gun – an 8 mm Gebauer 1934/40A M. A second machine gun placed in the front of the hull and controlled by the radio operator was also considered, although it is not present on the 1:10 scale mockup photos – this machine gun may have been removed from the design or it may have been added after the 1:10 scale mockup photos were made.

The 8 mm Gebauer 1934/40A M machine gun (also called 1934/40.M or 34/40M or 34/40A) is a gas-operated Hungarian tank machine gun designed by Ferenc Gebauer. It is chambered for 8x56mmR and is belt fed. Its muzzle velocity is 730 m/s and its rate of fire is 1000 rounds per minute, although according to a different source these values are 750 m/s and 950 rpm respectively. The Tas was able to take 3000 rounds of machine gun ammunition in 100 round belts. Reportedly, the unique sound of these Gebauer machine guns brought fear to the Soviet soldiers on the Eastern Front. Any captured useable Gebauer machine gun was taken to the USSR by the Red Army.

== Misinterpreted assault gun variant (44M Tas Rohamlöveg) ==
During his research in the 1980s, Hungarian historian Pál Korbuly discovered sources mentioning the production of Tas chassis components in pairs. He speculated that one vehicle was intended to be a tank destroyer version and created a sketch based on this hypothesis. The characteristics of this hypothetical vehicle, which was referred to as the 44M Tas Rohamlöveg (Tas assault gun), were subject to discussion and conjecture. This project was widely accepted as fact by many. However, in the 2000s, information surfaced indicating that the second Tas chassis was intended to be another regular Tas tank, not a tank destroyer variant. According to newly discovered documents, the Manfred Weiss factory was tasked with producing two vehicles: one prototype made of iron, to serve as a sample for further development, and one prototype made of actual armor plates. This evidence confirmed that both vehicles were intended to be 44M Tas tanks, not tank destroyers. Despite this discovery, many still believe in the existence of the Tas tank destroyer project, and fictional characteristics have been attributed to it, even though no documents or blueprints for a Tas tank destroyer variant have been found. Other researchers have stated that this was merely a mistake. Even Korbuly later admitted in a historically themed magazine that the idea of a Tas tank destroyer was entirely his own, inspired by the World War II practice of developing tank destroyer versions of successful tanks

There is no evidence of a Tas tank destroyer project ever existing.

Another misconception held by many is the belief that the 75 mm gun was a KwK 42. Hungary never had the license of the KwK 42 and did not have any, furthermore, Germany never gave any KwK 42 tank guns to Hungary. The 75 mm gun that was to be mounted on the Tas was simply a tank gun variant of the Hungarian license built Pak 40 (and not the KwK 40) which was called 7.5 cm 43.M anti-tank gun, the tank gun variant being the 7.5 cm 43.M tank gun.

== See also ==
Similar tanks

- 43M Turán III
- A41 Centurion Mk 1
- IS-1 & IS-2
- M26 Pershing
- P43 tank
- Panther tank
- T-34/85
- Tiger I
