= 43M Zrínyi =

World War II Hungarian assault gun

43M Zrínyi II
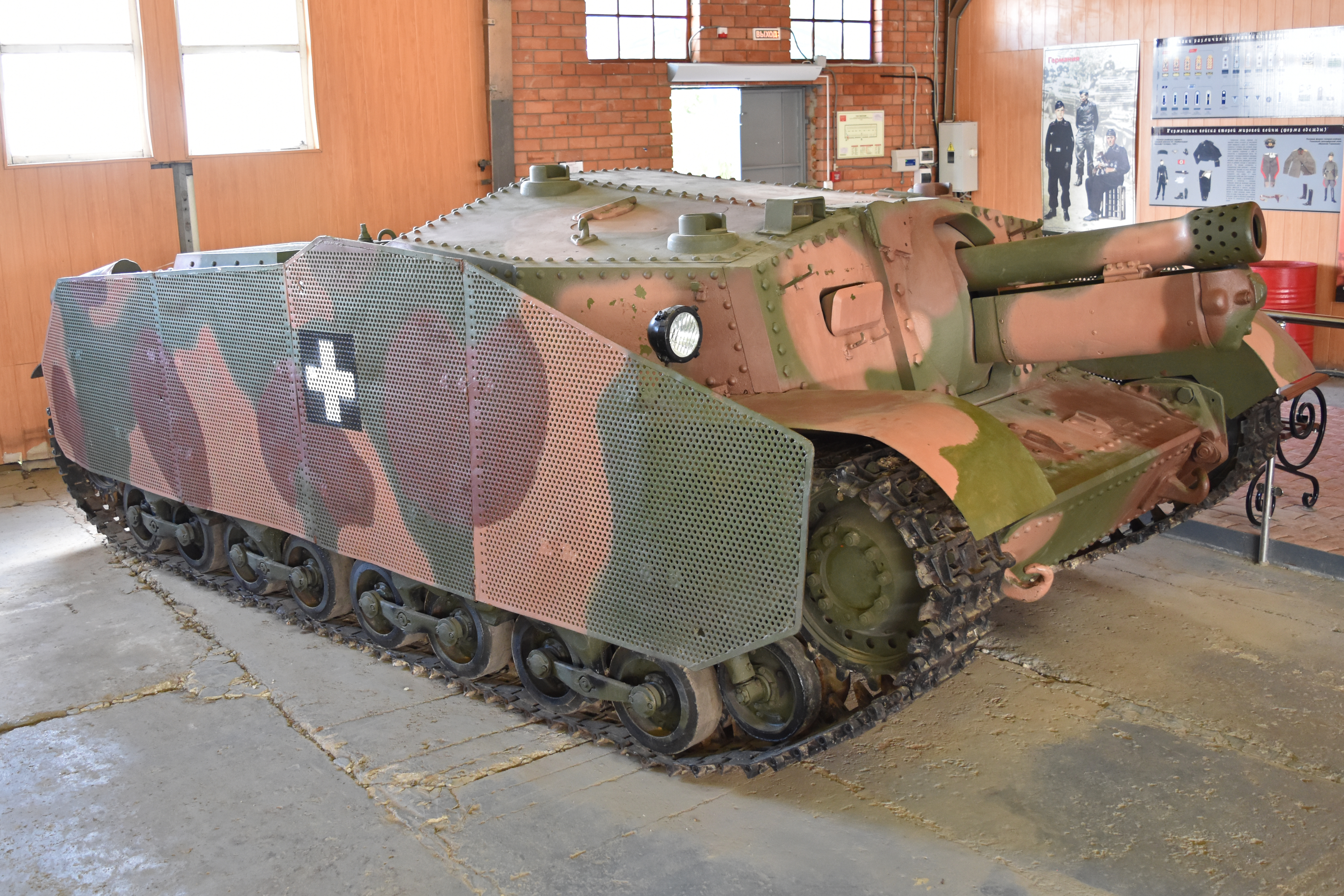
- 43M Zrínyi II in Kubinka Tank Museum
- Type: Assault gun
- Place of origin: Kingdom of Hungary

Service history
- In service: 1943–1945
- Used by: Kingdom of Hungary
- Wars: World War II

Production history
- Designer: Manfréd Weiss
- Designed: 1942
- Manufacturer: Manfréd Weiss, Ganz
- Produced: 1943–1944
- No. built: 72 (43M Zrínyi II)
- Variants: 43M Zrínyi II; 44M Zrínyi I

Specifications (Zrínyi II)
- Mass: 21.6 t
- Length: 5.90 m (19 ft 4 in)
- Width: 2.99 m (9 ft 10 in)
- Height: 1.90 m (6 ft 3 in)
- Crew: 4
- Armour: 13–75 mm (0.51–2.95 in)
- Main armament: 40/43M 105 mm MÁVAG L/14 or L/20.5 howitzer 52 rounds
- Engine: Manfréd Weiss Z-V8H-4 8 cylinder 260 hp
- Power/weight: 12 hp/t
- Fuel capacity: 445 l
- Operational range: 220 km (140 mi)
- Maximum speed: 43 km/h (27 mph)

The 43M Zrínyi II was a Hungarian assault gun of World War II based on the Turán medium tank chassis. The Zrínyi assault gun was used to fight against the Soviets on the Eastern Front and in the defence of Hungary.

== Development ==
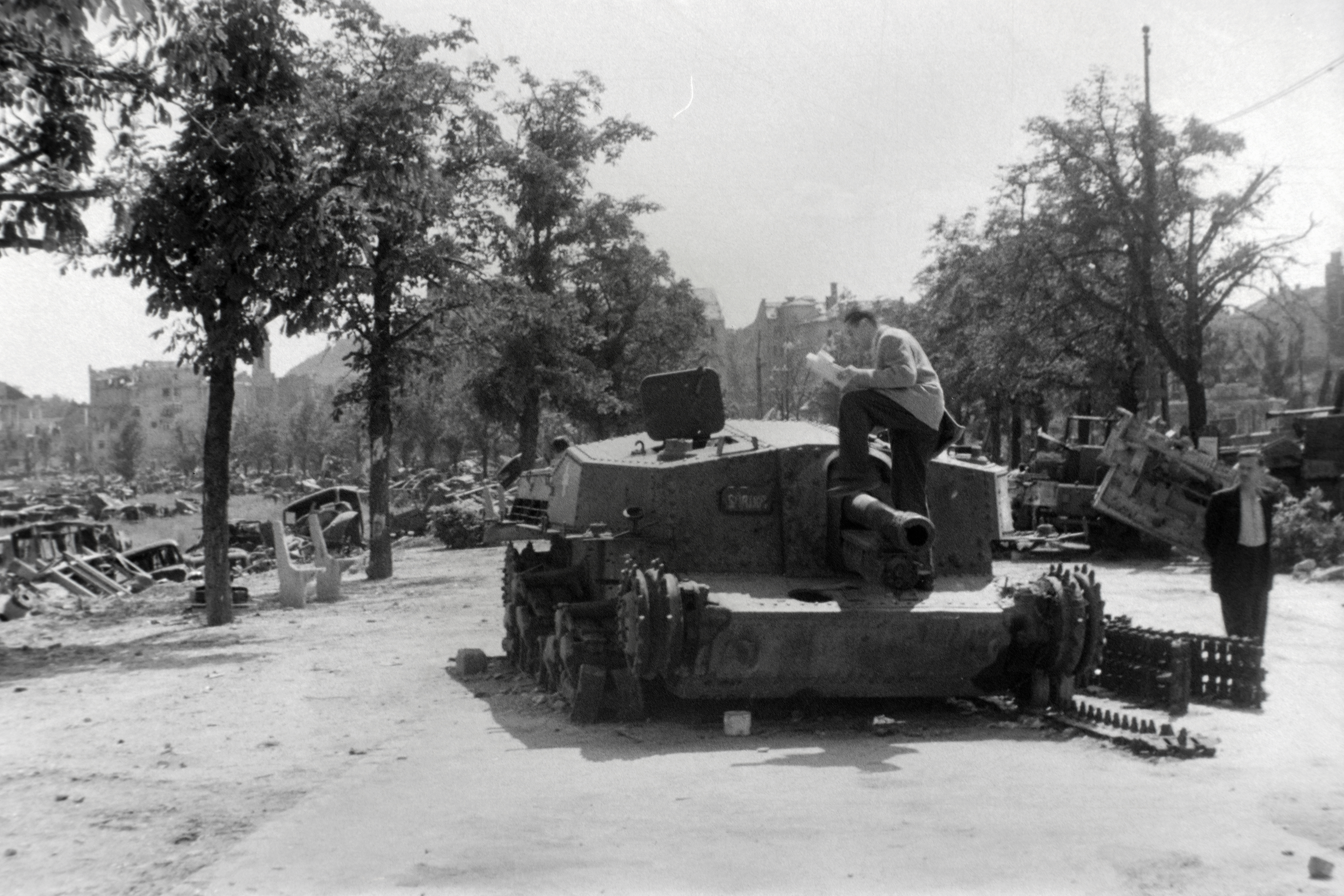
A destroyed Zrínyi II Assault Gun of the 1/3rd Assault Battery at Vérmező park, Budapest, 1945. The white inscription on the driver's visor reads SÁRIKA, the name of the commander's fiancé.

The Hungarian Ministry of Defence had seen the value of self-propelled assault artillery as early as 1940 and, after experiences on the Eastern Front in 1941, recommended the acquisition of self-propelled guns. The Ministry of Defence had wanted to acquire the German Sturmgeschütz III and negotiated with Germany to try to acquire either deliveries of the vehicle, or the rights to produce it in Hungary. However, the Hungarians could only receive a fraction of what they needed, and started to design a similar vehicle of their own.

Following the success of assault guns on the Eastern Front, the situation required the fastest way possible to start the production of a vehicle of the same role. The engineers at the Manfréd Weiss Works decided to use the base of the Turán tank as it was a proven, solid chassis already in use in the Hungarian army.

As for the armament, both a first variant mounting the long-barrelled 43M 75 mm anti-tank gun (which was still in development), and another version equipped with the 40M 105 mm MÁVAG howitzer which was compatible with the leFH 18's ammunition was considered.

== Design ==
The hull of the Turán was made wider and higher to make space to house the large caliber cannon, with the front armor being reinforced to a total thickness of 75 mm.

The first variant would become the 44M Zrínyi I armed with the 43M 75 mm gun and 100 mm frontal armor, being accepted for service in 1944, and the later one resulted in the 43M Zrínyi II. The Zrínyi II was armed with a short barrel (14 or 20.5 calibers) 105 mm MÁVAG 40/43M howitzer. The Zrínyi II's design was a traditional infantry support vehicle, while the Zrínyi I was hoped to fulfill an anti-tank role.

== Production ==
After the successful army trials in December 1942, the military leadership ordered 40 Zrínyi IIs. These were finished until the end of 1943. In January 1944, 50 more vehicles were ordered, 20 of these rolled out of the factories between March and July.

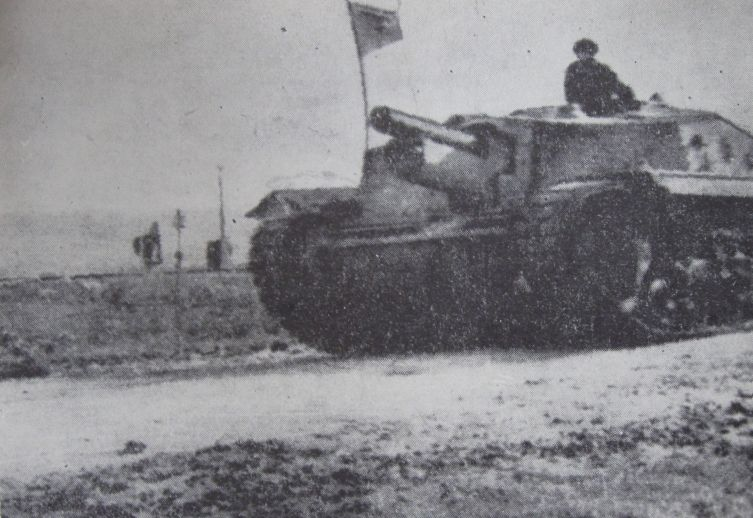
Romanian-captured Zrínyi II near Cluj (Hun. Kolozsvár) in late 1944

On the morning of July 27, after 6 new Zrínyis were finished, factory was hit by a bombing raid, which resulted in its collapse. Around 20 semi-finished Zrínyi 105s were saved and at least 6 of them were rebuilt by Ganz. In total at least 72 Zrínyi II were delivered to the armored units.

== Service ==
The 43M Zrínyis were sent to the 1st, 2nd and 3rd assault battalions, and mainly fought in Galicia in the summer of 1944 against the massive Soviet offensive. They also fought in the defence of Hungary from late 1944 to early 1945.

Several Zrínyi IIs were captured by the USSR during the Soviet occupation of Hungary, one was also captured by Romania during October 1944, but it was later confiscated by the Red Army.

There is only one surviving Zrínyi II in the Kubinka Tank Museum near Moscow.

== See also ==
=== Related development ===
- Zrínyi I – Hungarian tank destroyer variant of the Zrínyi II
- Turán I/Turán II – Hungarian medium tank used as the basis for the Zrínyi II
- Turán III – Hungarian medium tank developed from the Turán II
- 44M Tas – Hungarian heavy tank developed to replace the Turán series, shared some components with the Turán and Zrínyi series

=== Tanks of comparable role, performance, and era ===
- StuG III – German assault gun
- StuH 42 – German assault gun, very similar to the Zrínyi II
- Sav m/43 – Swedish assault gun
- Semovente 105/25 – Italian assault gun
- SU-122 – Soviet assault gun

== Sources ==
- Bíró Ádám: A 40/43. M Zrínyi–II rohamtarack fejlesztése és alkalmazása. Haditechnika, I. rész: 1996/1, 66–71., II. rész: 1996/2, 43–45.; III. rész: 1996/4, 66–69. (In Hungarian)
- Mark Axworthy, Cornel Scafeș, Cristian Crãciunoiu, Third Axis. Fourth Ally. Romanian Armed Forces in the European War, 1941-1945, Arms and Armour, London, 1995. ISBN 1-85409-267-7
- Dr. Bonhardt Attila. A Zrínyi-II rohamtarack. Haditechnika, 20 - 1986. ISSN 0230-6891 (in Hungarian) at page 124 http://real-j.mtak.hu/11707/1/Haditechnika_1986.pdf
- Mujzer, Péter (2021). History of the 40/43M Zrínyi Assault Howitzer. in Combat. Vol. 08. Kagero Publishing. ISBN 978-83-66673-37-3.
- Mujzer, Péter (2021). Hungarian Arms and Armour of World War Two. Modern Wars. Vol. 3. Stamford, UK: Key Publishing Ltd. ISBN 978-1-913870-64-5.
