= 8 cm FK M 18 =

Austro-Hungarian field gun used in World War One and Two

8 cm Feldkanone M 18
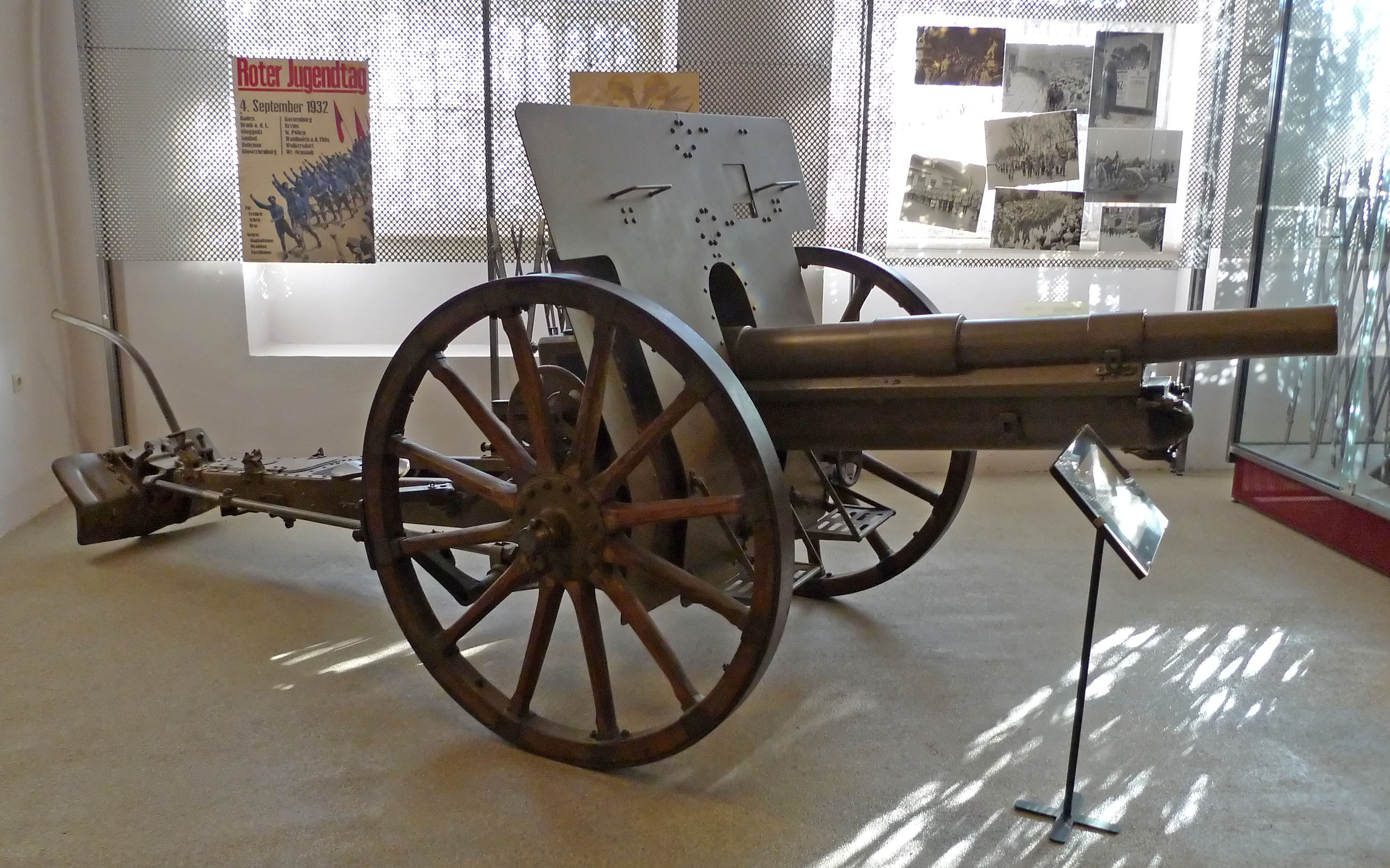
- At the Heeresgeschichtliches Museum
- Type: Field gun
- Place of origin: Austria-Hungary

Service history
- In service: 1918–1945
- Used by: Austria-Hungary; Austria; Hungary; Nazi Germany; Republic of China
- Wars: World War I World War II

Production history
- Designer: Böhler
- Designed: 1917–18
- Manufacturer: Böhler

Specifications
- Mass: 1,478 kg (3,258 lb)
- Barrel length: 2.756 m (9.04 ft) L/33
- Shell: Fixed 8 kg (18 lb) − Standard; 76.5 x 233mm R Fixed 9.99 kg (22 lb) − prototype
- Caliber: 76.5 mm (3.01 in) − Standard; 83.5 mm (3.29 in) − prototype
- Recoil: Hydro-pneumatic
- Carriage: Box trail
- Maximum firing range: 12,078 m (13,209 yd) − 83.5 mm prototype

Designed by Böhler, the M18 ‘Feldkanone’ field gun was a mobile artillery piece firing a standard shell chambered in 76.5 x 233mm.

Being Austro-Hungarian in origin— designed in 1917, the gun initially faced competition with Skoda, of which Böhler had taken the lead with its accuracy with the inclusion of a longer barrel, allowing for increased mission operation scale.

Despite the M18’s triumph, the M17 field gun continued to serve alongside its cousin during the two World Wars.

With an effective range of 10,500 meters (10.5km), an estimated rate of fire of 10-15 rounds per minute, and a projectile speed of 500m/s, the field gun found itself extensive use in trench warfare and artillery bombardment.

Its post-war service is unclear, serving in small numbers with the Austrian Army, with Germany not placing it into service following the Anschluss due to it using non-standard ammunition. A copy was also manufactured in China as the "Type 14 77mm" from 1925. The M 18 was also modified by the Hungarians for installation as the main armament in their indigenous 41M Turán tank.

The carriage of the M 18 had a bent axle which allowed the whole carriage to traverse, with it having a narrow set of wheels for mountain use. For transport it broke down into three pieces, to be carried on carts.

== Sources ==
- Gander, Terry and Chamberlain, Peter. Weapons of the Third Reich: An Encyclopedic Survey of All Small Arms, Artillery and Special Weapons of the German Land Forces 1939-1945. New York: Doubleday, 1979 ISBN 0-385-15090-3
- Ortner, M. Christian. The Austro-Hungarian Artillery From 1867 to 1918: Technology, Organization, and Tactics. Vienna, Verlag Militaria, 2007 ISBN 978-3-902526-13-7
- Chamberlain, Peter and Gander, Terry. Light and Medium Field Artillery. New York, Arco
