= Obice da 210/22 =

Obice da 210/22 modello 35
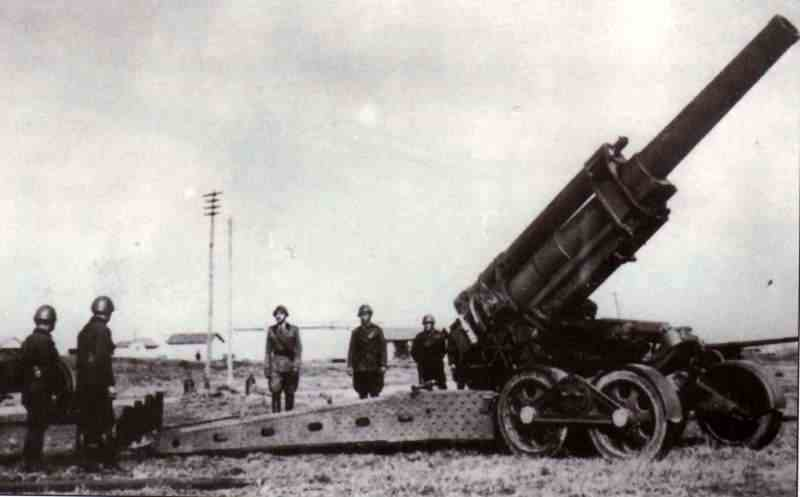
- The 210/22 gun
- Type: Howitzer
- Place of origin: Italy

Service history
- Used by: Italy; Nazi Germany; Hungary
- Wars: World War II

Production history
- Manufacturer: Ansaldo
- No. built: approx 85 by Sep 1943 (small number built for Germany post armistice)

Specifications
- Mass: Combat:15,885 kg (35,020 lb); Travel: 24,000 kg (53,000 lb) in two loads
- Barrel length: 5 m (16 ft 5 in) L/23.8
- Shell: HE; 101 kg (223 lb)
- Caliber: 210 mm (8.3 in)
- Recoil: Hydro-pneumatic
- Carriage: Split trail
- Elevation: 0° to +70°
- Traverse: 75°
- Muzzle velocity: 560 m/s (1,800 ft/s)
- Maximum firing range: 15,400 m (16,800 yd)

The Obice da 210/22 modello 35 was an Italian heavy howitzer designed by the Italian Arms and Munitions Technical Service (STAM) and accepted into service by the Royal Italian Army in 1938. A total of 346 were ordered and the gun was produced by Ansaldo at their Pozzuoli factory. However production was slow and approximately 85 were produced by September 1943. After Italy surrendered Germany seized as many as they could and a factory in Northern Italy continued to produce a small number for the German Army. The carriage was split trail with four wheels which raised from the ground for firing and the gun was trunnioned under the breech to allow for maximum recoil and elevation.

== Derivatives and designations ==
- 21 cm 39.M: Hungarian designation for guns purchased from Italy.
- 21 cm 40.M: Hungarian-produced version featuring carriage modifications.
- 21 cm 41.M: Final Hungarian-produced version which entered production in 1943.
- 21 cm Haubitze 520(i): German designation for guns captured after the Italian surrender in 1943 and kept in production until the end of the war.

== See also ==
- List of artillery

== Books ==
- Hogg, Ian Twentieth-Century Artillery. New York: Barnes & Nobles, 2000 ISBN 0-7607-1994-2

== Link ==
- https://web.archive.org/web/20170401233549/http://ww2photo.se/gun/ita/ha/210-22.htm
