= 105 mm MÁVAG 40/43M =

- Type: Howitzer
- Place of origin: Hungary

Service history
- In service: 1940–1945
- Used by: Royal Hungarian Army
- Wars: World War II

Production history
- Designer: MÁVAG
- Manufacturer: MÁVAG
- Produced: 1940-1945
- No. built: 72?
- Variants: 43M Zrínyi assault gun

Specifications
- Mass: 1,600 kg (3,500 lb)
- Barrel length: 2.15 m (7 ft 1 in) L/20.5
- Shell weight: 15 kg (33 lb)
- Caliber: 105 mm (4.1 in)
- Carriage: box trail
- Muzzle velocity: 448 m/s (1,470 ft/s)
- Maximum firing range: 10.4 km (6.5 mi)

The 105 mm MÁVAG 40/43M was a Hungarian howitzer used in World War II. It was designed and produced by MÁVAG for the Royal Hungarian Army. It was a conservative design with horse traction, box trail and a muzzle brake. It is estimated that only 72 were produced between 1940 and 1945 with the majority being used to arm the 43M Zrínyi assault gun.
