= Heinkel He 45 =

Light bomber

He 45
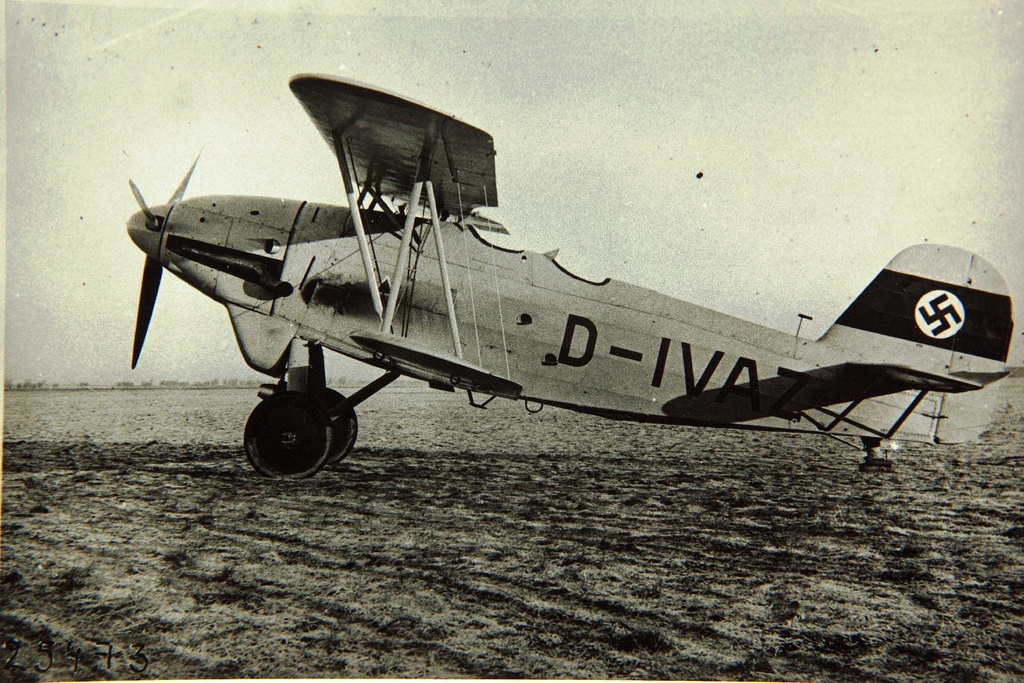
- Heinkel He 45

General information
- Type: Light bomber
- Manufacturer: Heinkel
- Primary user: Luftwaffe
- Number built: 512

History
- First flight: 1931

The Heinkel He 45 was a light bomber produced in Germany in the early 1930s, one of the first aircraft adopted by the newly formed Luftwaffe. Its appearance was that of a conventional biplane and included seating for pilot and gunner in tandem, open cockpits. Developed in parallel with the He 46, it appeared in 1931 as a general-purpose biplane and was employed mainly as a trainer, but was also used by the Luftwaffe for reconnaissance and light bombing duties. Production of this plane totalled 512 aircraft, including those built under licence by Gotha, Focke-Wulf, and BFW.

== Variants ==
He 45a
First prototype, powered by a BMW VI 7,3Z piston engine.
He 45b
Second prototype, fitted with four-blade propeller.
He 45c
Third prototype, armed with one 7.92 mm (.312 in) forward-firing MG 17 machine gun, and one 7.92 mm MG 15 machine gun in the rear cockpit.
He 45A
Initial production version.

He 45A-1

Training version.

He 45A-2

Reconnaissance version.
He 45B
Improved production version.

He 45B-1

Reconnaissance version, armed with a 7.92 mm (0.312 in) machine gun.

He 45B-2

Able to carry a 100 kg (220 lb) bombload.
He 45C
Production version of the He 45c.
He 45D
Slightly improved version. Similar to the He 45C.
HD 61a
Reconnaissance export version of He 45B intended for China, powered by a 492 kW (660 hp) BMW VI piston engine.
B.Kh.8
(Thai: บ.ข.๘) Royal Siamese Air Service designation for the He 45.
A.2
Spanish Air Force designation for the He 45C.

== Operators ==
Bulgaria

- Bulgarian Air Force

China

- One HD 61a tested and crashed during a demonstration on 22 August 1931.

Germany

- Luftwaffe

Hungary

- Royal Hungarian Air Force operated a single He 45C.

Spanish State

- Spanish Air Force

Thailand

- Royal Siamese Air Service and Royal Thai Air Force

== Specifications (He 45C) ==
Data from Warplanes of the Third Reich

General characteristics

- Crew: 2
- Length: 10.6 m (34 ft 9 in)
- Wingspan: 11.5 m (37 ft 9 in)
- Height: 3.6 m (11 ft 10 in)
- Wing area: 34.6 m^{2} (372 sq ft)
- Empty weight: 2,110 kg (4,652 lb)
- Gross weight: 2,751 kg (6,065 lb)
- Powerplant: 1 × BMW VI 7.3 V-12 liquid-cooled piston engine, 560 kW (750 hp)
- Propellers: 2-bladed fixed-pitch propeller

Performance

- Maximum speed: 290 km/h (180 mph, 160 kn)
- Cruise speed: 221 km/h (137 mph, 119 kn)
- Range: 1,200 km (750 mi, 650 nmi)
- Service ceiling: 5,500 m (18,000 ft)
- Time to altitude: 1,000 m (3,300 ft) in 2 minutes 24seconds

Armament

- Guns: 1 × 7.92 mm (.312 in) forward firing MG 17 machine gun and one MG 15 machine gun in rear cockpit
- Bombs: 300 kg (660 lb) bombs

== See also ==
Related lists

- List of aircraft of World War II
- List of military aircraft of Germany
