= 40M Turán =

Hungarian medium tank of World War II

40M Turán I/41M Turán II
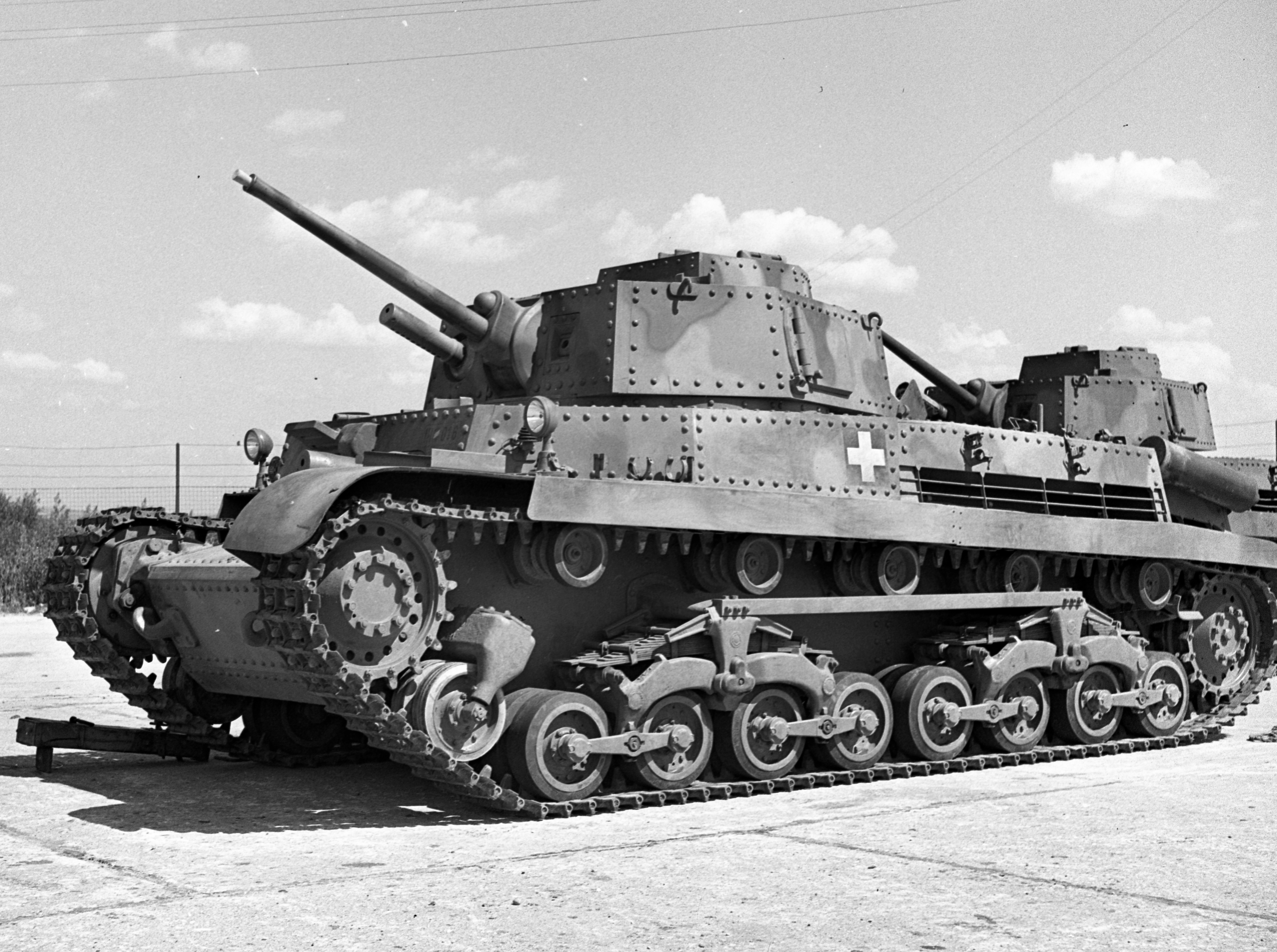
- 40M Turán (Turán I) in 1943
- Type: Medium tank
- Place of origin: Kingdom of Hungary Czechoslovakia

Service history
- Used by: Kingdom of Hungary; Kingdom of Bulgaria
- Wars: World War II

Production history
- Designer: Institute of Military Technology of the Hungarian Army (HTI), DIMÁVAG factory, Škoda Works – designed the T-21 prototype
- Designed: 1938
- Produced: 1940–1944
- No. built: 424
- Variants: 40M Turán (Turán I); 41M Turán (Turán II); 43M Turán (Turán III)

Specifications
- Mass: 18.2 tonnes
- Length: 5.55 m (18 ft 3 in)
- Width: 2.44 m (8 ft 0 in)
- Height: 2.39 m (7 ft 10 in)
- Crew: 5
- Armor: 50 mm (2.0 in) maximum
- Main armament: 1 × 40 mm 41M L/51 (40M Turán I); 1 × 75 mm 41M L/31 (41M Turán II)
- Secondary armament: 2 × 8 mm Gebauer 34/40.M machine guns
- Engine: gasoline Weiss Manfréd Z-V8H-4; 260 hp (195 kW)
- Power/weight: 14 hp/tonne
- Suspension: leaf spring bogie
- Operational range: 165 km (103 mi)
- Maximum speed: 47 km/h (29 mph)

The Turán tanks were a series of Hungarian medium tanks of World War II. They were produced in two main variants: the original 40M Turán (or Turán I) with a 40 mm gun and later the 41M Turán (or Turán II) with a short-barreled 75 mm gun, improved armour and a new turret. A total of 285 40M Turán I tanks were made. The 40M Turán (Turán I) was originally inspired by and used the features found on the design of the Czechoslovak Škoda T-21 medium tank prototype. The Turán tanks fought on the Eastern Front against the Soviets, and in the defence of Hungary.

A further upgraded prototype variant, the 43M Turán (or Turán III) was also developed and constructed but did not go into mass production. This had a powerful long-barreled 75 mm gun, further improved armour and again had a new turret. Prototypes were manufactured, but work on the project stopped in 1944 when mass-production terminated in the country.

== History ==
In December 1937 the Škoda workshops prepared a prototype of a medium tank, the Škoda T-21, based on the earlier successful LT vz. 35 project. Two prototypes were designed and designated S-IIc, but their construction was never finished. The tank weighed 16.5 tonnes (16.2 long tons; 18.2 short tons), was armed with a 4.7 cm KPÚV vz. 38 gun, two 7.92 mm machine guns and its maximum armour was increased to 30 mm. The S-II-c was to have an improved 13.8 liter engine giving 250 hp; this increased the maximum speed to roughly 50 km/h (31 mph)

After Germany annexed Czechoslovakia, the prototypes were finished under the new designation of T-21, which in turn was a predecessor of a new prototype; the T-22. Two of the latter type were given to Hungary in 1941. It is sometimes reported that the T-22 was the basis for the Turán, but it was actually the T-21 prototype that was used instead. The Hungarian engineers decided to replace the original 47 mm gun with an indigenous 40 mm design for economic and military reasons. Military experts stated that the armour penetration of the 47 mm gun was not better than the homemade 40 mms because the latter had a much higher muzzle velocity. The gun's performance was a bit below that of the Panzer III Ausf. H's main armament. The modifications of the tank gun were carried out by the Škoda factory – they used the original Czech gun cradle and placed the Hungarian made barrel into it. The frontal armour was increased too, with the engineers riveting a 15 mm armour plate onto the original 35 mm thick frontal armour for 50 mm in total, and the turret was likewise protected by the same arrangement. The Czech machine guns were changed to Hungarian 8 mm Gebauer 34/40.M guns. The overall weight was also increased to over 18 tonnes. Spaced armour in the form of side skirts were added in 1944 as protection from anti-tank rifles such as the PTRS-41 and PTRD-41.

== Variants ==
The Turán was produced in three versions – Turán I, II and III. The Turán I was the original medium tank with the 40 mm gun. The gun, the standard Hungarian light anti-tank gun, fired the same 40×311mmR cartridge as the Bofors 40 mm L/60 anti-aircraft gun, which Hungary produced under license at the time. The turret was of riveted construction. Between 1941 and 1943 a total of 285 40M Turán I tanks were produced.

The combat experiences of 1941 made Hungary realize that the 40.M Turán (Turán I) which was at the time still under development and construction would not meet the expectations of modern medium tanks. The General Staff of the Hungarian Army changed the second order of 309 medium tanks to 87 medium and 222 heavy tanks armed with a 75 mm gun. This order was later changed again in 1941 to 55 medium and 254 heavy tanks. The General Staff also declared that the new heavy tank must be constructed from those Turáns already built without changing the engine and the weight of the new tank must be comparable to the heavy tank. The mentioned heavy tank would become the Turán II.

The prototype of the heavy tank and the new 75 mm gun was ordered from the Institute of Military Technology of the Hungarian Army (HTI) in 1941. The HTI did not have any gun designer nor production departments so they had to choose from an already existing gun and try to modify it. The engineers chose the 75 mm 41M L/25, based on the 18.M field artillery gun – 8 cm Feldkanone M.18 – which had been in service since World War I. The HTI ordered the modification of the gun to be done by the Swedish Bofors company, which willingly accepted.

Both the modifications of the chassis – increasing armor thickness to 50 mm by riveting extra 20 mm armour plates on the frontal armour and lower glacis, changing the driver's hatch from a single door which opened to the right to a two-piece folding door which opened to the front, and the prototype of the new gun and turret were finished in January 1942, with the new turret being finished in February 1942. The new 75 mm gun was the first Hungarian tank gun with a horizontal semi-automatic sliding block.

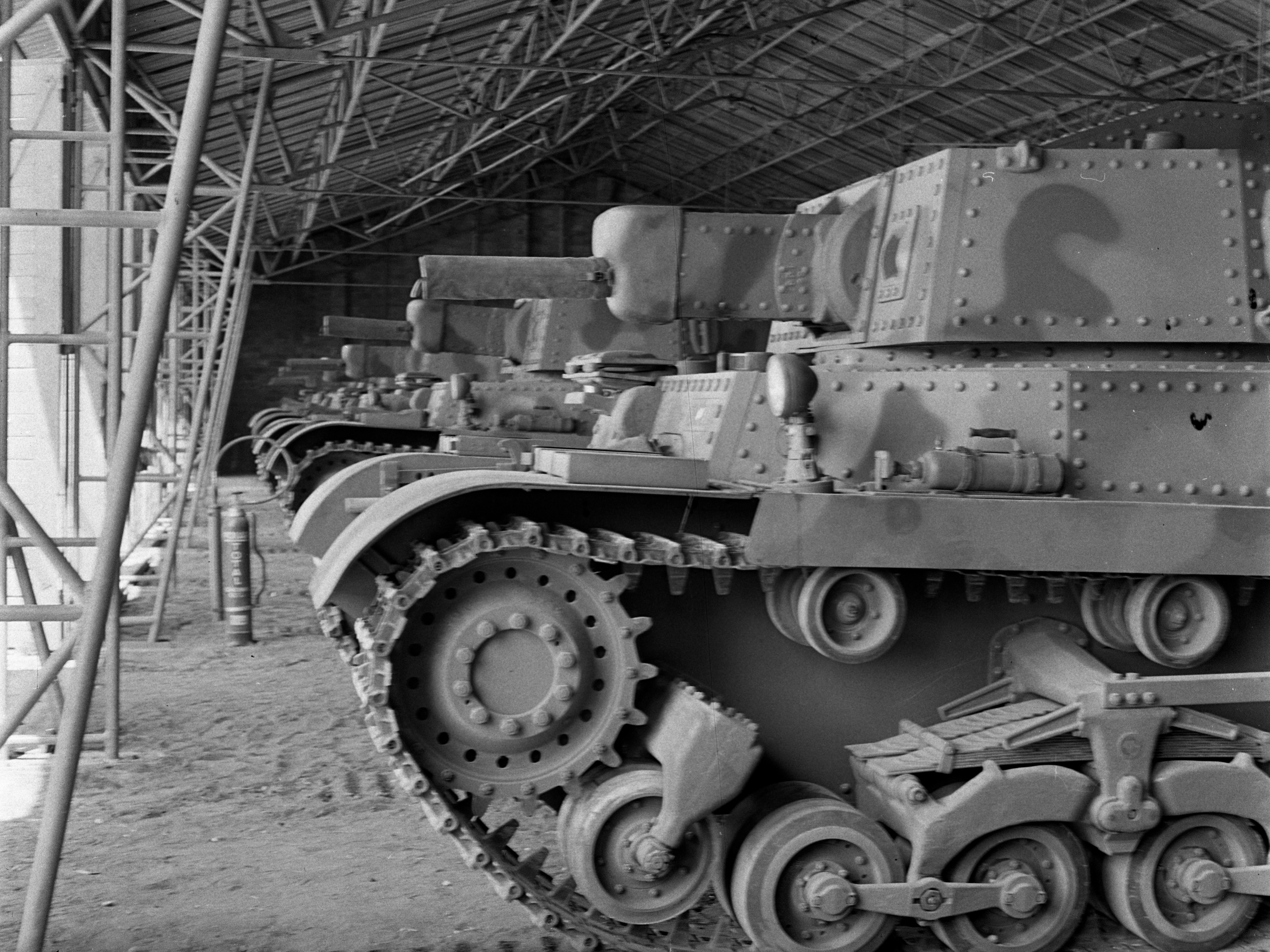
Turán II tanks in Royal Hungarian Army storage facility in Mátyásföld, Budapest, 1943

During the installation, the gun cradle cracked and repairs delayed the production of the vehicle even further. On May 6, 1942, all the preparations were done for ground testing, and the gun cradle was repaired. The test was successful and the new heavy tank was put into service as the 41.M Turán (also known as Turán II or "Turán 75 short"). The first Turán IIs were not delivered to their units until September–October 1943 because the production of gun optics and ammunition were delayed.

By that time the Turán II became obsolete as well, but it was still lethal to T-34 medium tanks within 500 meters, which was still good progress compared to previous Hungarian armored vehicles. According to records from 1944, 129 Turán IIs were issued to combat effective units; factory notes recorded that 182-185 41.M Turán heavy tanks (Turán IIs) were manufactured. According to other sources, around 195 Turán IIs were made.

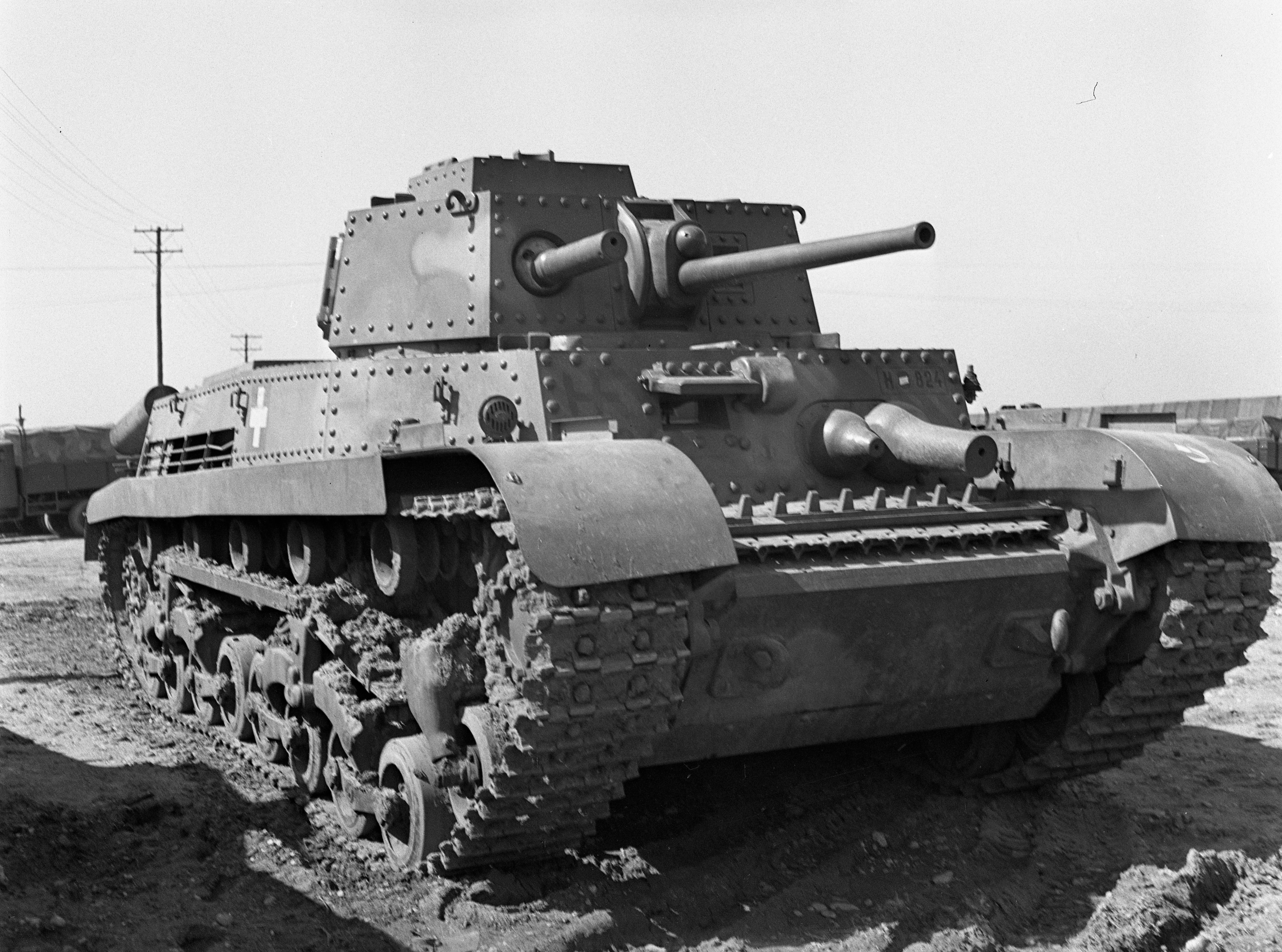
40M Turán I in Budapest, Hungary, 1943

Aside from tank production, the chassis was the basis for the Zrínyi II assault gun. This mounted a 105 mm short gun in the hull and lacked the traversable turret of a tank. A total of 66-72 Zrínyi IIs were made during the war. The only other vehicles known based on this chassis were the Turán III and the Zrínyi I, both of which used the 7.5 cm 43.M tank gun. The 7.5 cm 43.M tank gun was developed from the blueprints of the PaK 40, converted for Hungarian production.

The Turán III's prototype with an actual turret was finished in February 1944. Unlike the frontal armour of the hull which was thickened by riveting two armour plates together, the 75 mm thick armour of the turret was made of only one plate. Mobility and firing tests were carried out after the prototype was completed and the prototype was accepted for mass-production. However, no more 43.M Turáns (a.k.a. Turán III or Turán 75 long), or Zrínyi Is were constructed because of the lack of materials and the fact that after the occupation of Hungary in March 1944, Germany did not allow further tank and gun production, restricting the Hungarian industry to only spare part manufacturing level.

It is not known if the Zrínyi I and Turán III were officially put into service, and their fate is unknown. There is at least one account of the Turán III seeing combat.

== Service history ==
Turáns were used in fighting on the Eastern Front in Galicia, Transylvania, the Dukla Pass and the Battle of Hungary against the Soviet Union and Romania.

The Turán saw its combat debut with the 2nd Hungarian Armored Division on the 17th of April 1944. Thirty-one 40M Turán I and seventeen 40M Turán II tanks launched an offensive from Solotwina towards the Bistrica River. A number of Turán tanks were captured after the 1944 Royal Coup by the Kingdom of Romania, along with some Toldis and a Zrínyi assault gun. Turans also took part in the Battle of Torda and the Battle of Debrecen where they were deployed against Soviet cavalry attacks at Gyula. On 17 March 1945 the Bulgarian 1st Independent Tank Battalion was equipped with 12 captured tanks, including a Turán, taken by the 3rd Ukrainian Front to replace the loses it had suffered in the fighting around Lake Balaton. Some of the last Turáns in Hungarian service surrendered to Soviet forces, alongside the last Zrínyi assault gun, on 21 March 1945 in Bratislava.

== Survivors ==
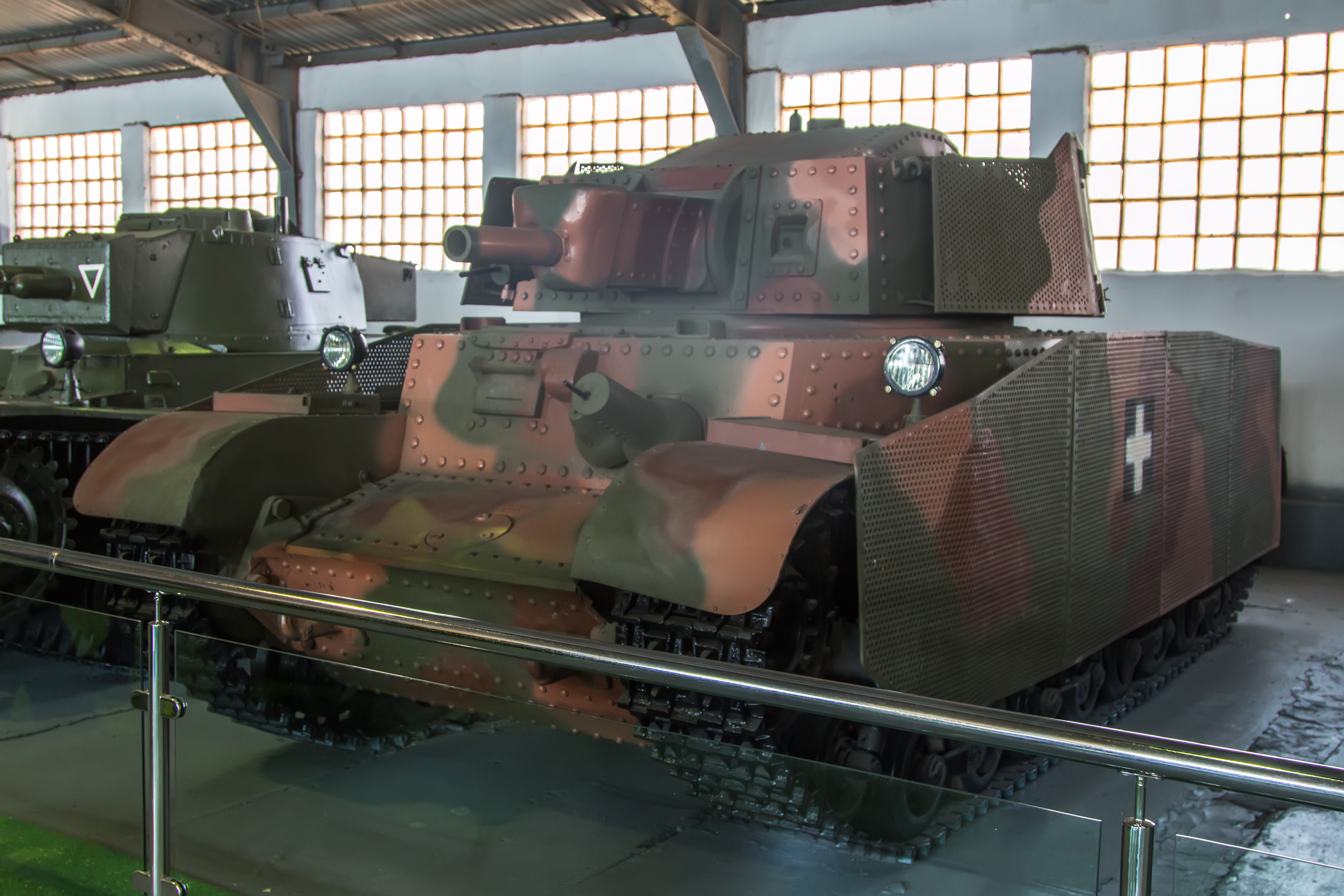
The only surviving 41M Turán II in Kubinka, near Moscow

Whilst multiple Turáns were captured by Romanian and Soviet forces, there is only one known surviving example. It is a Turán II (41M Turán) on display at the Kubinka Tank Museum in Russia.

== See also ==
Related development

- Turán III – Hungarian medium tank developed from the Turán II
- Zrínyi II – Hungarian assault gun developed from the Turán
- Zrínyi I – Hungarian tank destroyer developed from the Turán
- 44M Tas – Hungarian heavy tank developed to replace the Turán series, shared some components

Tanks of comparable role, performance, and era

- ST vz. 39 (V-8-H) – Czechoslovak prototype medium tank competing with Škoda T-21
- Panzer III – German medium tank
- Panzer IV – German medium tank
- T-28 – Soviet medium tank
- T-34 – Soviet medium tank
- R-3 – Romanian project, also based on the Škoda T-21
