= 44M Zrínyi I =

Hungarian assault gun/tank destroyer of World War II

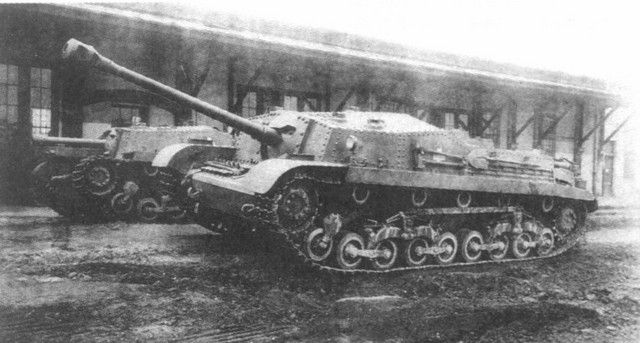
- The Zrínyi I tank destroyer (without the rocket launchers). A Zrínyi II can be seen in the background.
- Type: Assault gun/Tank destroyer
- Place of origin: Kingdom of Hungary

Service history
- In service: Unknown – possibly 1944–1945
- Used by: Kingdom of Hungary
- Wars: World War II

Production history
- Designer: Manfréd Weiss
- Designed: 1942–1943
- Manufacturer: Manfréd Weiss, Ganz
- Produced: 1944
- No. built: 1-4

Specifications (Zrínyi I)
- Mass: 22 t
- Length: 7.35 m (24 ft 1 in)
- Width: 2.99 m (9 ft 10 in)
- Height: 1.90 m (6 ft 3 in)
- Crew: 4
- Armour: 13–75 mm (0.51–2.95 in)
- Main armament: 75 mm 43.M L/43 tank gun
- Secondary armament: 6 rocket launcher tubes for 15 cm Nebelwerfer 41 rockets
- Engine: Manfréd Weiss Z-V8H-4 8 cylinder 260 hp
- Power/weight: 12 hp/t
- Fuel capacity: 445 l
- Operational range: 220 km (140 mi)
- Maximum speed: 40 km/h (25 mph)

The 44M Zrínyi I was a Hungarian assault gun/tank destroyer of the Second World War. Developed from the successful 43M Zrínyi II, it was armed with a long 75 mm gun that was more suited to anti-tank warfare. This was the same 75 mm 43.M gun that was used on the 43M Turán III medium tank.

The Zrínyi series of military vehicles was named after Nikola IV Zrinski, a Hungarian national hero who died in 1566.

== Development ==
The Hungarian army saw the value in assault guns as early as 1940, and by 1942 the ministry of defence had started to look into acquiring some. Initially the Hungarians wished to either purchase German assault guns outright, or to acquire the production licenses. A Hungarian delegation may have gone to Italy in 1942 to look at the Semovente assault gun.

The Hungarian military leadership commissioned Manfréd Weiss to design and manufacture an assault gun. The hull of the Turán tank was used for this production. It was widened by 40cm and a superstructure was developed to replace the turret. The sides of the superstructure were angled at 80 degrees. To combat the heavier armoured Soviet tanks it was decided to produce the Zrínyi with a 75mm gun.

The Hungarian General Staff decided in May 1943 to phase out the production of Turán tanks by spring 1944 and switch the production to assault guns as part of the Szabolcs Plan. The Szabolcs Plan called for the production of 168 44M Zrínyi assault guns. However, due to allied bombing no more than four 44M Zrínyi assault guns could have been produced; with only one known to have been fully completed.

In late 1943 the Military Technology Institute of the Hungarian Army considered mounting the German 15 cm Nebelwerfer 41 on the Zrínyi hull. The rockets had a practical range of seven kilometers, and the idea was for them to be used to destroy Soviet anti-tank gun positions before the Zrínyi would be in danger. The rockets were mounted to the 44M Zrínyi prototype for testing.

== See also ==
Related development

- 40/41M Turán I/II – The hull of the Turán was used to create the Zrínyi assault guns
- 43M Zrínyi II – Variant of the Zrínyi with a 105mm howitzer

Vehicles of comparable role, performance, and era

- Semovente 75/18 – Italian assault gun
- Semovente 75/34 – Italian assault gun/tank destroyer
- Sturmgeschütz III – German assault gun/tank destroyer
- SU-85 – Soviet assault gun
- Mareșal – Romanian prototype tank destroyer
