= 15 cm Nebelwerfer 41 =

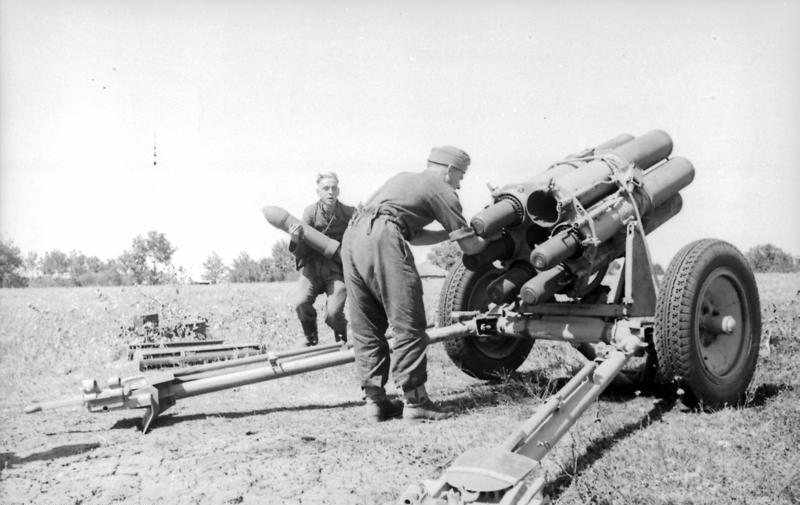
- A 15 cm Nebelwerfer 41 launcher while reloading
- Type: Rocket artillery
- Place of origin: Germany

Service history
- In service: 1941–45
- Used by: Germany; Hungary
- Wars: World War II

Production history
- Designed: late 1930s
- Unit cost: 3,350 ℛ︁ℳ︁
- No. built: 5,283

Specifications
- Mass: Empty: 510 kg (1,120 lb); Loaded: 770 kg (1,700 lb)
- Length: 3.6 m (11 ft 10 in)
- Barrel length: 1.3 m (4 ft 3 in)
- Width: 1.6 m (5 ft 3 in)
- Height: 1.4 m (4 ft 7 in)
- Crew: 5
- Caliber: 158 mm (6.22 inch)
- Barrels: 6
- Carriage: Split-trail
- Elevation: +5° to +45°
- Traverse: 27°
- Muzzle velocity: 342 m/s (1,120 ft/s)
- Maximum firing range: 6.9 km (4.3 mi)

The 15 cm Nebelwerfer 41 (15 cm NbW 41) was a German multiple rocket launcher used in the Second World War. It served with units of the Nebeltruppen, German Chemical Corps units that had the responsibility for poison gas and smoke weapons that were also used to deliver high-explosives during the war. The name Nebelwerfer is best translated as "smoke thrower".

Allied troops nicknamed it Screaming Mimi and Moaning Minnie due to its distinctive sound.

== Development ==
Rocket development had begun during the 1920s and reached fruition in the late-1930s. These offered the opportunity for the Nebeltruppen to deliver large quantities of poison gas or smoke simultaneously. The first weapon to be delivered to the troops was the 15 cm Nebelwerfer 41 in 1940, after the Battle of France, a purpose-designed rocket with gas, smoke, and high-explosive warheads. It was fired from a six-tube launcher mounted on a towed carriage adapted from that used by the 3.7 cm PaK 36 to a range of 6,900 metres (7,500 yds), later also mounted on a halftrack as Panzerwerfer 42. Almost five and a half million 15 cm rockets and six thousand launchers were manufactured over the course of the war.

== Ammunition ==
Like virtually all German rocket designs, 15 cm Wurfgranate 41 projectiles were spin-stabilized to increase accuracy. However, one unusual feature was that the rocket motor was in the front, the exhaust venturis being about two-thirds down the body from the nose, with the intent to optimize the blast and fragmentation effect of the rocket as the warhead would still be above the ground when it detonated. This proved to greatly complicate manufacture without much improvement and it was not copied on later rocket designs. The motor consisted of seven sticks of solid-fuel propellant and the exhaust ring had twenty-six venturis that were drilled at a 14° angle to impart spin. There were high-explosive, smoke and chemical warfare rockets available. The chemical warfare rockets were stockpiled but are said to have not been used operationally. Field Rocket Equipment of the German Army 1939-45 lists Phosgene Gas and Mustard Gas as the two primary chemical agents but it does not describe how the rockets were identified with color coded rings. German and Japanese Solid-Fuel Rocket Weapons describes the color coding for the rockets but only gives cryptic codes like M/HA for the type of chemical agent it was filled with. (During the First World War German mustard gas ammunition had been marked in yellow, and phosgene ammunition in green. This coding system may or may not be related to the later system used by the Wehrmacht.)

Type	Designation	Length	Weight	Payload	Filling
High Explosive	15 cm Wurfgranate 41 Spreng	0.979 m (3 ft 2.5 in)	31.8 kg (70 lb)	2.5 kg (5.5 lb)	TNT
Smoke	15 cm Wurfgranate 41 Nebel	1.02 m (3 ft 4 in)	35.9 kg (79 lb)	3.9 kg (8.5 lb)	30/70 Pumice/Sulfur Trioxide
Chemical	15 cm Wurfgranate 41 Gelbring	1.02 m (3 ft 4 in)	?	3.5 L (0.77 imp gal; 0.92 U.S. gal)	M/HA
Chemical	15 cm Wurfgranate 41 Grünring	1.02 m (3 ft 4 in)	?	2.5 L (0.55 imp gal; 0.66 U.S. gal)	HN-3
Chemical	15 cm Wurfgranate 41 Grünring/Gelbring	1.02 m (3 ft 4 in)	?	2.6 L (0.57 imp gal; 0.69 U.S. gal)	H

== Photo gallery ==
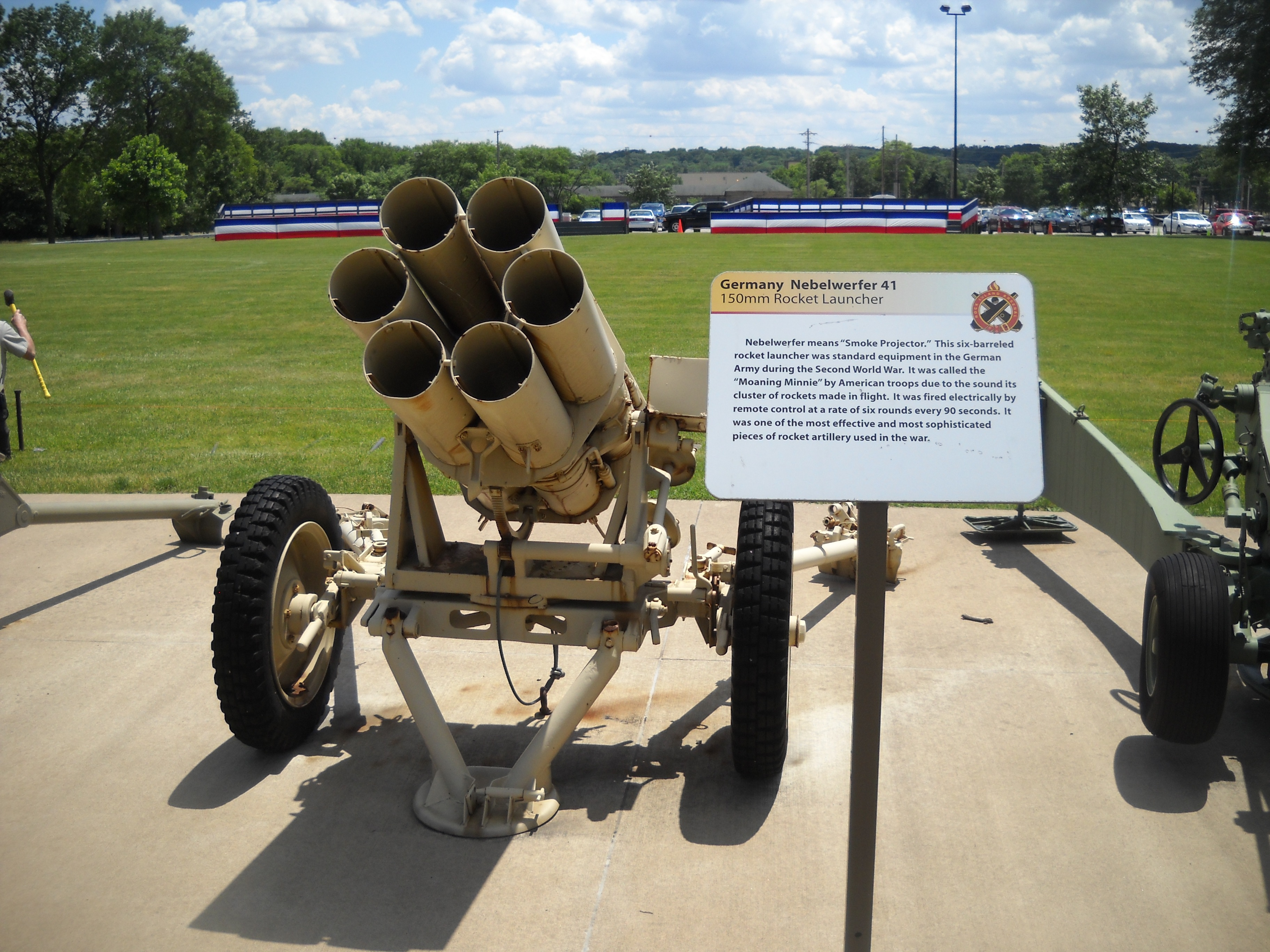
Nebelwerfer 41 rocket launcher on display at the Rock Island Arsenal museum, viewed from the front

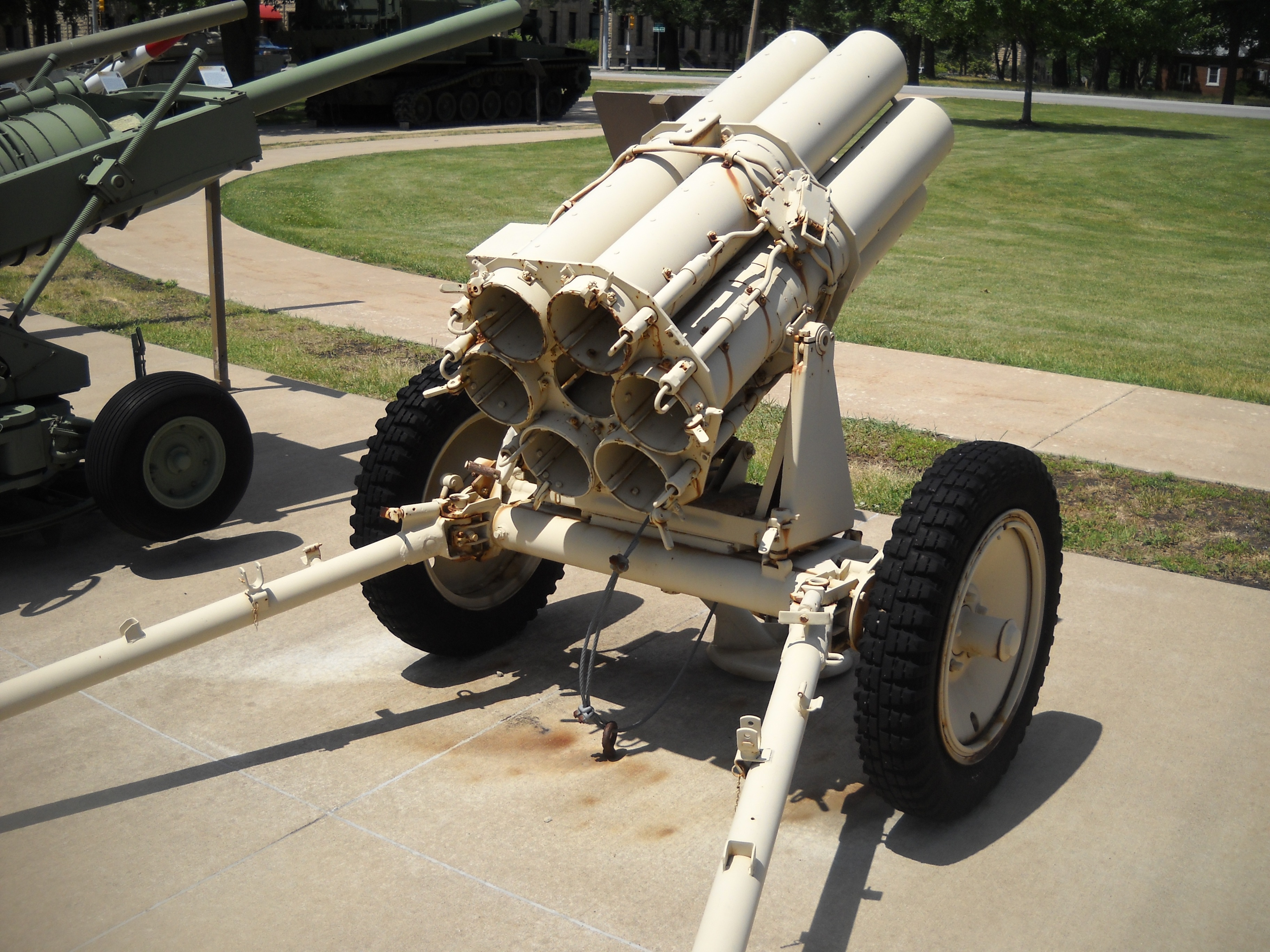
Nebelwerfer 41 rocket launcher, breech view

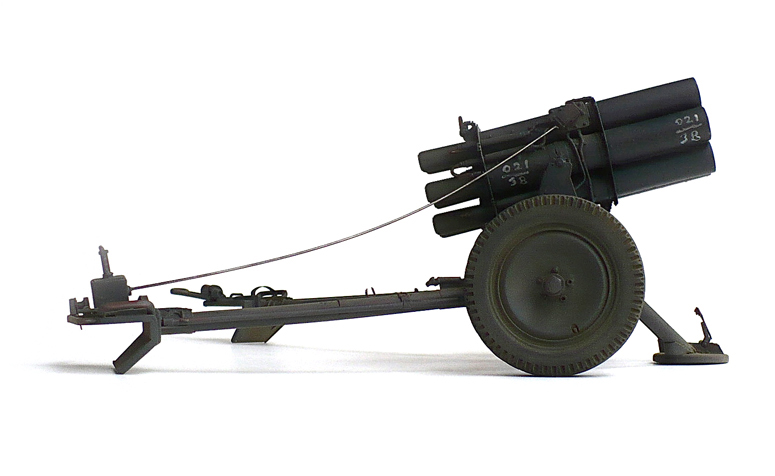
15 cm Nebelwerfer 41 side

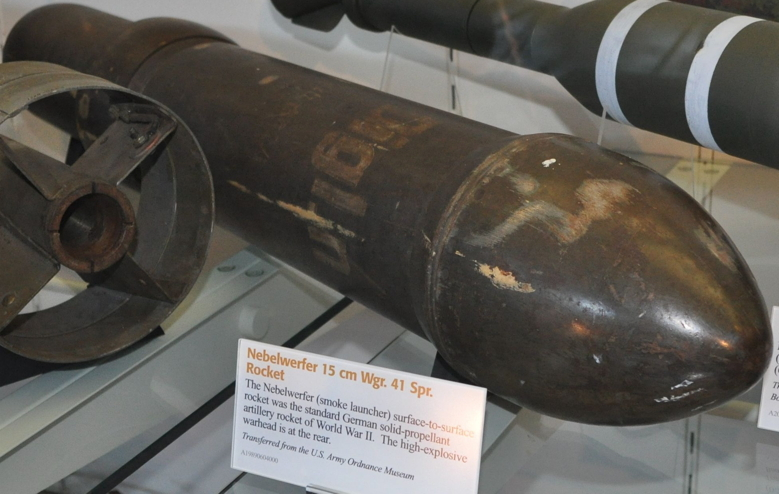
Wgr. 41 projectile for the 15 cm Nbw 41 on display at the Steven F. Udvar-Hazy Center

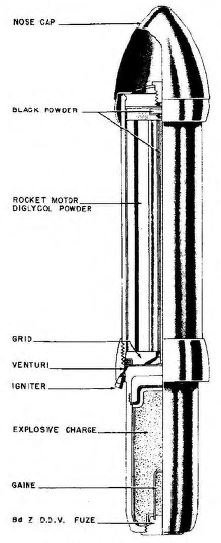
15 cm Wurfgranate 41 Spreng

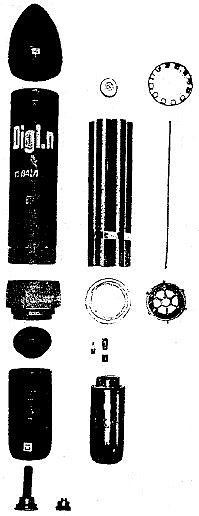
15 cm Wurfgranate 41 Spreng Schematic
