= 43M Turán III =

Hungarian medium tank

- Type: Medium tank
- Place of origin: Kingdom of Hungary (1920-1946)

Service history
- Used by: Kingdom of Hungary (1920-1946)

Production history
- Designer: MÁVAG
- Designed: 1943-44
- Produced: 1944
- No. built: 1 prototype

Specifications
- Mass: 21-23.3 tonnes
- Length: 6.60 m
- Width: 2.60 m
- Height: 2.70 m
- Crew: 5
- Armor: 13-95 mm
- Main armament: 1 × 75 mm 43M tank gun
- Secondary armament: 2 × 8 mm Gebauer 34/40.M machine guns
- Engine: Weiss Manfréd Z-V8H-4; 260 hp (195 kW)
- Power/weight: 12.5 hp/tonne
- Suspension: leaf-spring bogie
- Operational range: 165 km
- Maximum speed: 40-47 km/h

The 43M Turán III or 44M Turán III was a Hungarian medium tank of World War II. It was based on the 41M Turán II medium tank but was equipped with a significantly larger turret and a much more powerful long-barreled 75 mm gun.

== Development ==
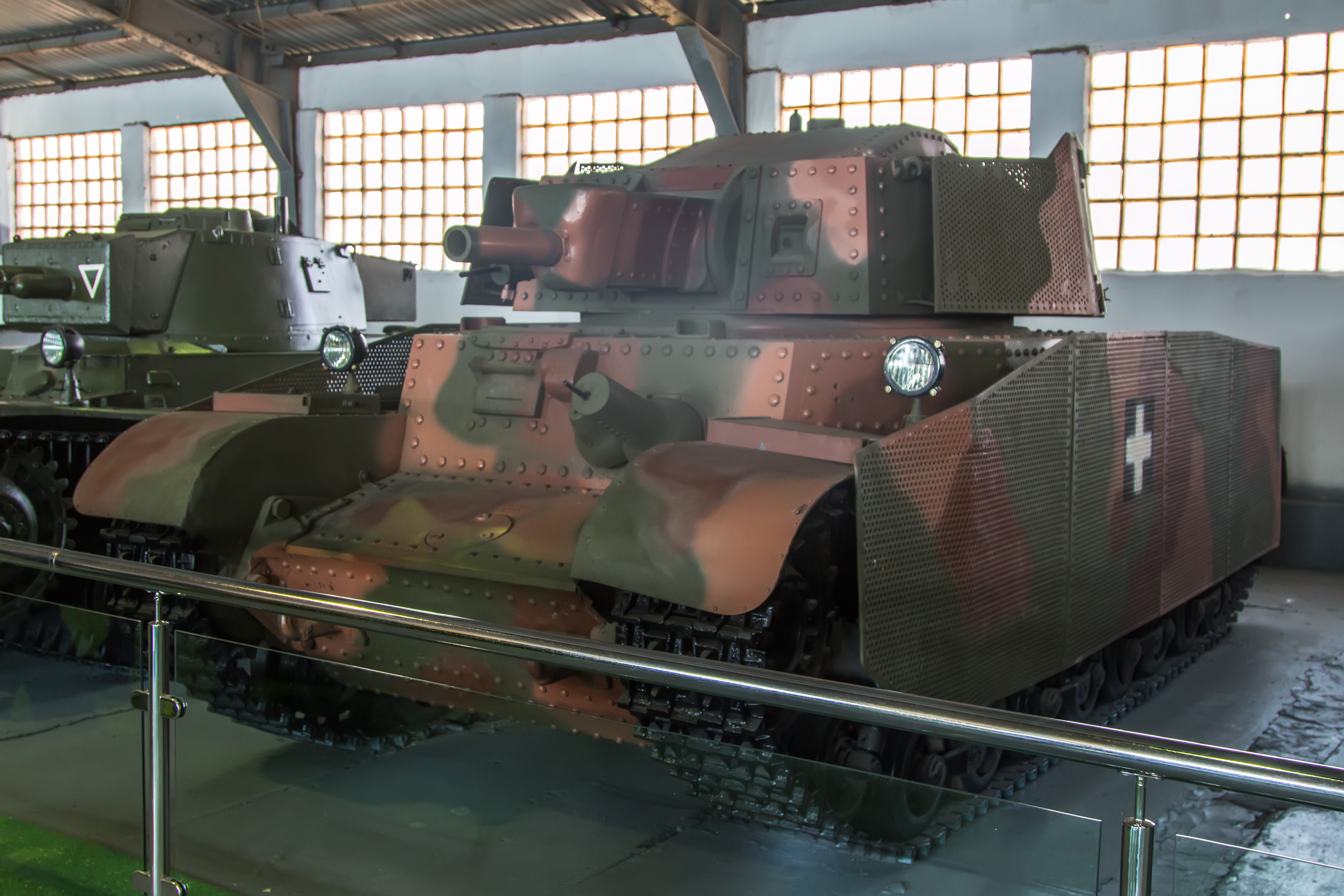
The Hungarian Turán II medium tank from which the Turán III was developed.

Though the Turán I and II had not yet seen combat, in February 1943 the General Staff of the Honvédség decided it was necessary to begin a modernization program to improve the tanks. In April 1943 the Hungarian General Staff debated whether to build the Turán III or to obtain the license to produce the long barrelled Panzer IV. Major General Zoltan Harmos asserted that the Panzer IV was not superior enough to the planned Turán III to be worth the price the Germans would ask for the production license.

Realizing they were in need of a better tank gun, the Hungarians designed and built the 75mm 43M tank gun (although they copied the German 75mm Pak/40 and the guns look similar in appearance, the 43M is not a Pak/40). However, after encountering developmental problems with the gun only 2x pieces were completed by the DIMAVAG factory (both completed by the end of December 1943). The guns were subsequently split up, with one going to the Turán III project and the other to the Zrinyi I project.

In September 1943, a wooden mockup (as well as the prototype) of the Turán III was built based on the chassis of a Turán I. The first prototype (complete with additional armor and 8mm sideskirt plates) was finished in February 1944. It had a new turret and an additional 25mm of armor added to the front and rear of the tank.

== Production ==
Two Turán III vehicles were produced, a wooden mockup and a fully functioning prototype for the trials. The Turán III with the actual turret was finished in February 1944. Mobility and firing tests were then carried out. However, no more 43M Turáns (Turán III or Turán 75 long) were constructed because of a lack of materials and the fact that after the Occupation of Hungary in March 1944, Germany did not allow further tank and gun production, and restricted Hungarian industry to only spare part manufacturing level.However, this was most likely circumvented in the case of the 44M Tas' development.

== Service ==
There are no confirmed reports of any Turán III's seeing action. Although a Hungarian tank driver named József Czimmermann stated that there were several Turan III in the 2nd Armoured Division during the fighting near the Ipoly in late 1944 and that the damaged Turán III's were captured by the Soviet Union, this is not corroborated by any other sources. It could be that he mistook several Turán II's for Turán III's, as there is a bit of evidence that a few Turán II's (4-5) were upgraded to Turán III's without the gun/turret (although this evidence is not very solid either). Ultimately the fate of the Turán III prototype is unknown, although it was most likely destroyed due to the fact that the Soviets would probably have brought it home as a war trophy had they captured it.

== See also ==
Related development

- 40/41M Turán I/II – Hungarian medium tanks from which the Turán III was developed
- 44M Zrínyi I – Hungarian tank destroyer with the same gun and hull

Tanks of comparable role, performance, and era

- 44M Tas – Hungarian medium/heavy tank
- A27M Cromwell – British medium/cruiser tank
- Carro Armato P.43 – Italian medium/heavy tank proposal
- M4 Sherman – American medium tank
- Panzer IV – German medium tank
- T-34 – Soviet medium tank
- Stridsvagn m/42 - Swedish medium tank
