= Gnome-Rhône Mistral Major =

1930s French radial aircraft engine

Mistral Major
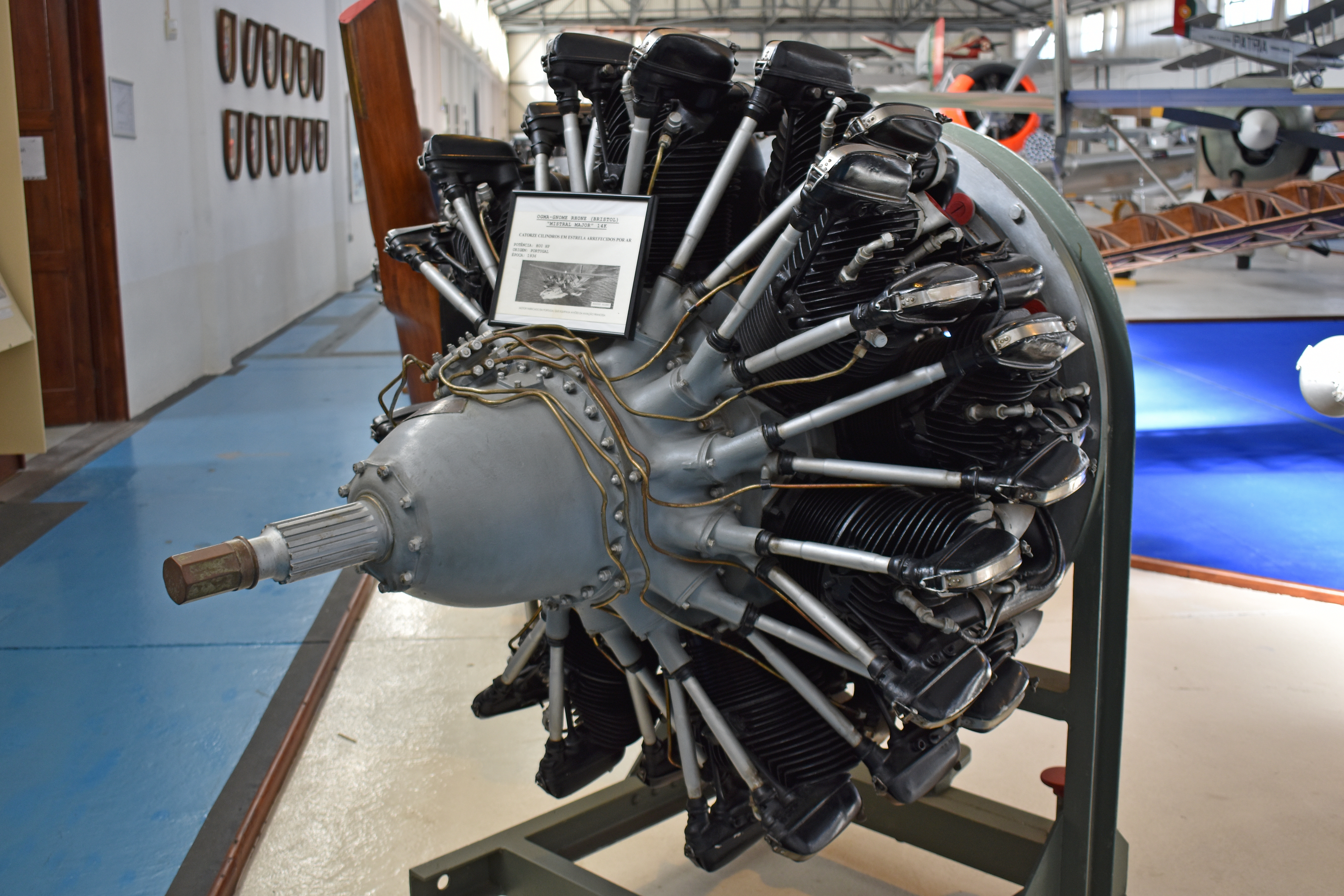
- Gnome-Rhône 14K on display at the Museu do Ar
- Type: Radial engine
- Manufacturer: Gnome et Rhône
- First run: 1929
- Developed into: Gnome-Rhône 14N

The Gnome-Rhône 14K Mistral Major was a 14-cylinder, two-row, air-cooled radial engine. It was Gnome-Rhône's major aircraft engine prior to World War II, and matured into a highly sought-after design that would see licensed production throughout Europe and Japan. Thousands of Mistral Major engines were produced, used on a wide variety of aircraft.

== Design and development ==
In 1922 Gnome-Rhône purchased a license for the highly successful nine-cylinder single-row Bristol Jupiter radial engine and produced it until about 1930, alongside the smaller five-cylinder Bristol Titan. Starting in 1926, however, they used the basic design of the Titan to produce a family of new single-row radial engines, the so-called "K series". With increasing numbers of cylinders, these started with the 5K Titan, followed by the 7K Titan Major and 9K Mistral. By 1930, 6,000 of these engines had been delivered.

However, the aircraft industry at that time was rapidly evolving and producing much larger aircraft that demanded larger engines to power them. Gnome-Rhône responded by developing the 7K into a two-row version that became the 14K Mistral Major. The first test examples were running in 1929.

As the Jupiter had set the pattern for one-row radials in the 1920s, the Mistral Major became a canonical design for twin-row radials of the 1930s. It was widely licensed and formed the basis for many successful designs. Among the licensees were Industria Aeronautică Română in Romania, Manfred Weiss in Hungary, Alvis of the UK, Tumansky in the USSR, Walter of Czechoslovakia, and Isotta Fraschini and Piaggio in Italy. Nakajima in Japan also licensed it, but did not put it into production, developing their own designs based on features taken from the Mistral and other designs.

== Variants ==
14Kbr
Reduction gearing
14Kbrs
Supercharged with reduction gearing
14Kdr
Reduction gearing
14Kds
Supercharger
14Kdrs
Supercharged with reduction gearing
14Kes
Supercharged (LH rotation)
14Kfs
Supercharged (RH rotation Kers)
14Kirs
Supercharged with reduction gearing (LH rotation)
14Kjrs
Supercharged with reduction gearing (RH rotation Kirs)
14Knrs
Supercharged with reduction gearing (LH rotation)
14Kors
Supercharged with reduction gearing (RH rotation Knrs)
Alvis Pelides
Development of engine with British fasteners. 15 built before project abandoned with start of Second World War as no suitable use in Air Ministry plans.
Isotta Fraschini K.14
license-built in Italy by Isotta Fraschini
IAM K14
licensed derivative produced in Yugoslavia
IAR K14
licensed derivative produced in Romania
Manfréd Weiss WM K-14
licensed derivative produced in Hungary
Piaggio P.XI
licensed derivative produced in Italy
Piaggio P.XIX
higher compression development of Piaggio P.XI
Tumansky M-85
license-built in USSR by Tumansky
Tumansky M-86
960 hp (715 kW) development of M-85 through increased supercharging and a higher compression ratio.
Tumansky M-87
Tumansky M-88
Walter Mistral Major
ИАМ K.14

== Applications ==
- Amiot 143
- Aero A.102
- Bloch MB.200
- Bloch MB.210
- Breguet 274
- Breguet 460
- Breguet 462
- Breguet 470
- Breguet 521
- Breguet 670
- Dewoitine D.371
- Dornier Do 17K
- Farman F.222
- Loire 46 C1
- Makhonine Mak-101
- PZL P.24
- PZL.43
- Potez 501
- Potez 506
- Potez 62
- Potez 651

=== Aircraft powered by Gnome-Rhône 14K derivatives ===
- Aero A.102
- Breda Ba.65
- Breda Ba.88
- CANT Z.1007
- CANT Z.1011
- Caproni Ca.135
- Caproni Ca.161
- Heinkel He 70
- IAR 37
- IAR 80
- Ilyushin DB-3
- MÁVAG Héja
- Reggiane Re.2000
- Saab 17
- Savoia-Marchetti SM.79
- Savoia-Marchetti SM.84
- Sukhoi Su-2
- Weiss Manfréd WM-16B Budapest II
- Weiss Manfréd WM-21 Sólyom
- Weiss Manfréd WM-23 Ezüst Nyíl

== Specifications (Gnome-Rhône 14Kd) ==
Data from

=== General characteristics ===
- Type: Fourteen-cylinder two-row air-cooled radial engine
- Bore: 146 mm (5.748 in)
- Stroke: 165 mm (6.496 in)
- Displacement: 38.673 L (2,360.0 cu in)
- Length: Kds - 1,317 mm (51.85 in)
  Kdr - 0.5 reduction gear - 1,528 mm (60.16 in)
  Kdr - 0.666· reduction gear - 1,530 mm (60.24 in)
  Kdrs - 0.5 reduction gear - 1,554 mm (61.18 in)
  Kdrs - 0.666· reduction gear - 1,556 mm (61.26 in)
- Diameter: 1,288 mm (50.71 in)
- Dry weight: Kdr 0.5 reduction gear - 503 kg (1,109 lb)
  Kdr 0.666· reduction gear - 508 kg (1,120 lb)
  Kdrs 0.5 reduction gear - 523 kg (1,153 lb)
  Kdrs 0.666· reduction gear - 528 kg (1,164 lb)
  Kds 502 kg (1,107 lb)

=== Components ===
- Valvetrain: Two Overhead valves per cylinder operated by pushrods
- Supercharger: (Kds / Kdrs - Single-speed centrifugal type supercharger)
- Fuel system: Stromberg carburetor
- Fuel type: 87 octane rating gasoline
- Cooling system: Air-cooled
- Reduction gear: Direct drive, 0.5:1 or 0.666·:1

=== Performance ===
- Power output: Kdr - 600 kW (800 hp) at sea level
  Kdrs - 580 kW (780 hp) at 1,500 m (4,900 ft) at 2,400 rpm
  Kdrs - 510 kW (680 hp) at 4,000 m (13,000 ft) at 2,400 rpm
  Kds - 560 kW (750 hp) at 1,500 m (4,900 ft) at 2,300 rpm
  Kds - 480 kW (650 hp) at 4,000 m (13,000 ft) at 2,300 rpm
- Specific power: Kdr 15.5 kW/L (0.34 hp/in³)
- Compression ratio: 5.5:1
- Specific fuel consumption: 328 g/(kW•h) (0.54 lb/(hp•h))
- Oil consumption: 20 g/(kW•h) (0.53 oz/(hp•h))
- Power-to-weight ratio: 1.52 kW/kg (0.92 hp/lb)

== Gallery ==
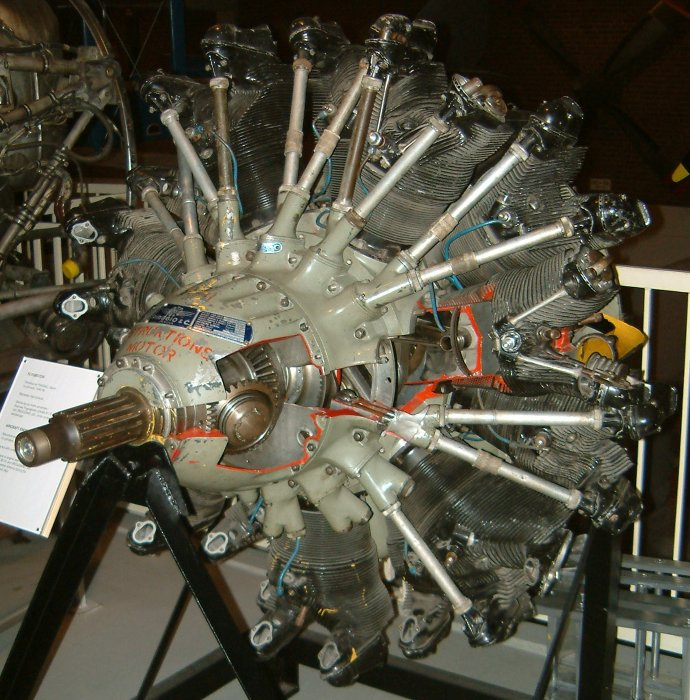
A Piaggio P.XI engine at the Malmohus Technical Museum, Malmo, Sweden.

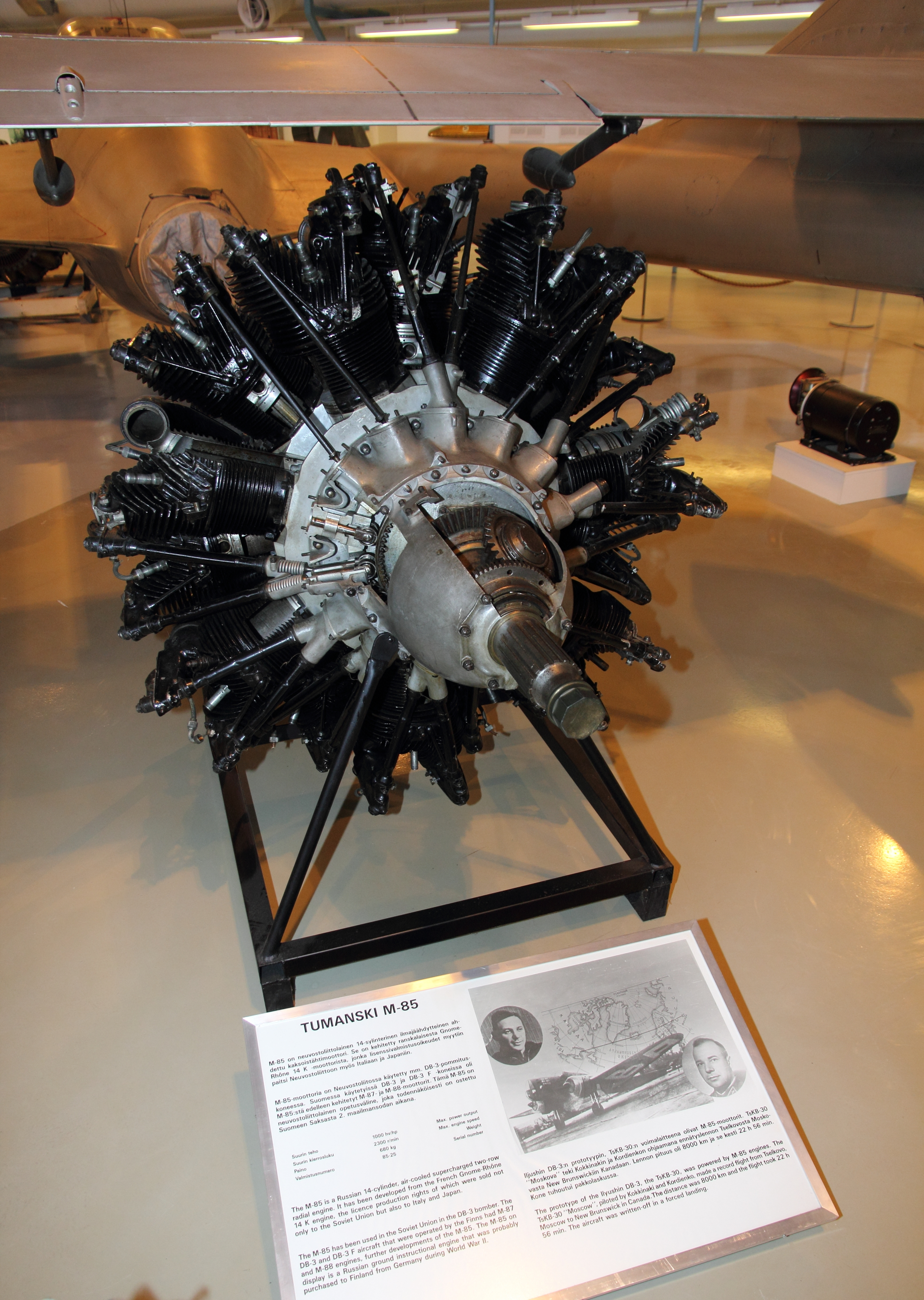
A Tumansky M-85 at the Aviation Museum of Central Finland.

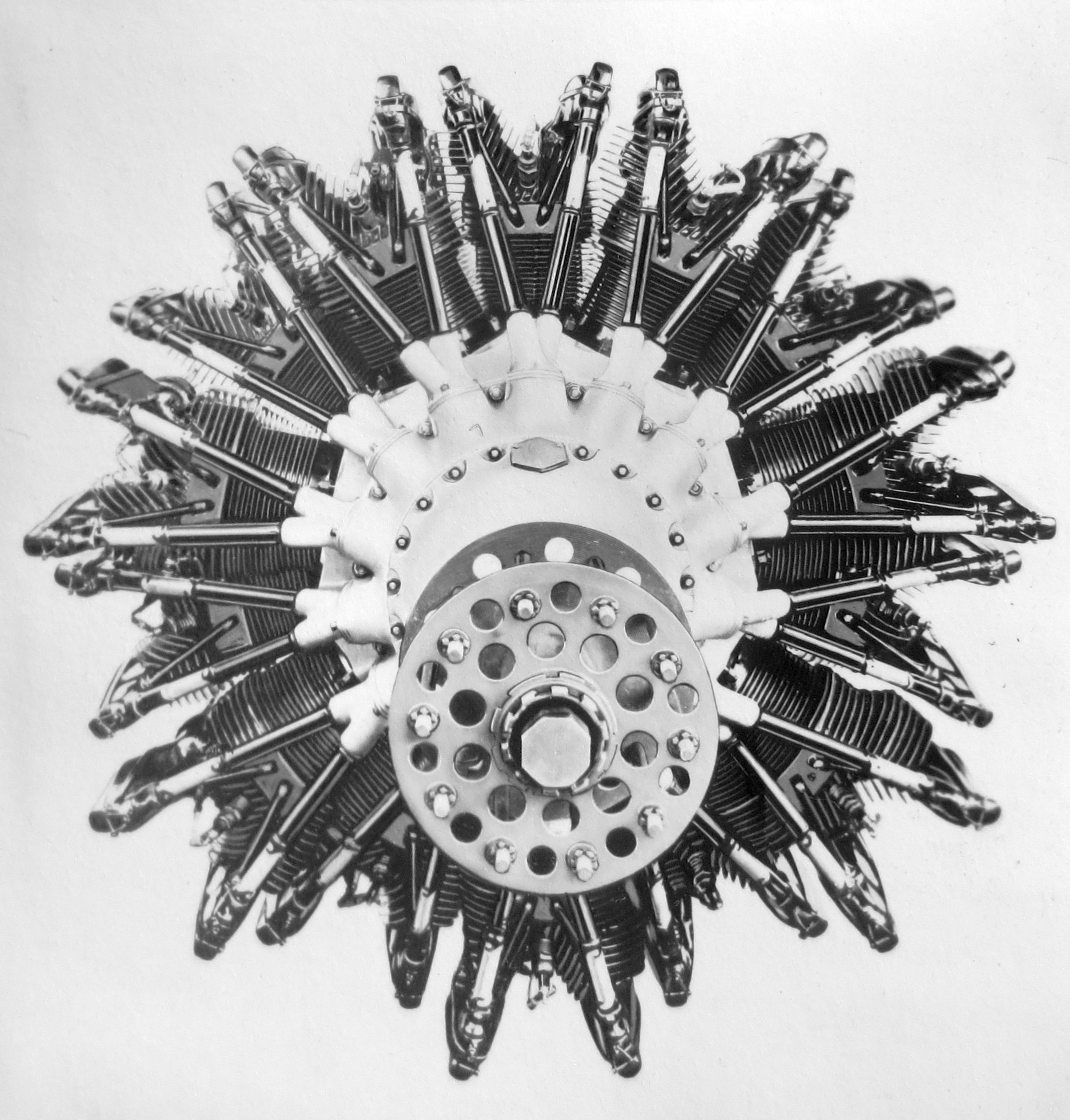
Walter Mistral Major.

A Walter Mistral Major at the Polish Aviation Museum in Krakow.

== See also ==
Related development

- IAR 14K
- Piaggio P.XI
- Tumansky M-87

Related lists

- List of aircraft engines
