= List of aircraft of Hungary in World War II =

This is a list of aircraft used by the Royal Hungarian Air Force (MKHL) during World War II. During the war, Hungary fought as part of the Axis powers in the Invasion of Yugoslavia (1941), on the Eastern Front against the Soviet Union (1941-1944), and in the Battle for Hungary (1944-1945). Some Hungarian Air Force units fought on after the fall of Hungary, operating from Austria or Germany until the end of the war.

== Fighters ==
Sources:

- Fiat CR.32 – 76-88 used (modified)
- Fiat CR.42 Falco – 70-72 used (modified)
- Focke-Wulf Fw 190 (F-8) – 72 used
- Heinkel He 112 - 3 used (modified)
- MÁVAG Héja I/II – around 70 Héja Is and 204 Héja IIs built
- Messerschmitt Bf 109 – around 700-800 built
- Messerschmitt Bf 110
- Messerschmitt Me 210 (Ca-1) – 267 built
- Messerschmitt Me 410
- Reggiane Re.2000
- Varga RMI-1 X/H – 1 built
- Weiss Manfréd WM-23 Ezüst Nyíl – 1 built

== Bombers ==
- Caproni Ca.135 – 68 used
- Caproni Ca.310 – 36 used
- Caproni Ca.314
- Dornier Do 23
- Dornier Do 215 – at least 11 used
- Fiat BR.20 Cicogna
- Heinkel He 45 – 1 He 45c used
- Heinkel He 46
- Heinkel He 111 – at least 7 delivered
- Junkers Ju 86 – 66-72+ used (modified)
- Junkers Ju 87 – received 33/34 Ju 87 D-3/D-5s and 11/12 B-1 and B-2s
- Junkers Ju 88
- Varga RMI-1 X/H
- Weiss Manfréd WM-16 Budapest
- Weiss Manfréd WM-21 Sólyom – 128 built

== Attackers ==
- Focke-Wulf Fw 190 (F-8) – 72 used
- Henschel Hs 129
- Junkers Ju 87 – received 33/34 Ju 87 D-3/D-5s and 11/12 B-1 and B-2s
- Messerschmitt Bf 110
- Messerschmitt Me 210 (Ca-1) – 267 built
- Messerschmitt Me 410

== Reconnaissance ==
- Caproni Ca.310 – 36 used
- Dornier Do 215 – at least 11 used
- Fieseler Fi 156 Storch
- Focke-Wulf Fw 189 Uhu
- Heinkel He 70 Blitz – 18 used (modified)
- IMAM Ro.37
- Weiss Manfréd WM-16 Budapest
- Weiss Manfréd WM-21 Sólyom – 128 built

== Trainers ==
- Arado Ar 96
- Breda Ba.25
- Bücker Bü 131 Jungmann
- Bücker Bü 133 Jungmeister
- Focke-Wulf Fw 44
- Focke-Wulf Fw 58
- Nardi FN.305
- Repülőgépgyár Levente II
- Weiss WM-10 Ölyv

== Transport aircraft ==
- Junkers Ju 52
- Messerschmitt Bf 108 Taifun – 7 used
- Savoia-Marchetti SM.75 – 5 used
