= Wm23 =

WM23 or WM-23 may refer to:

- WrestleMania 23
- Weiss Manfréd WM-23 Ezüst Nyíl
