= Weiss WM-16 =

Hungarian reconnaissance/bomber aircraft

The Weiss WM-16 Budapest was a reconnaissance/bomber aircraft developed by the Manfréd Weiss company in 1933.

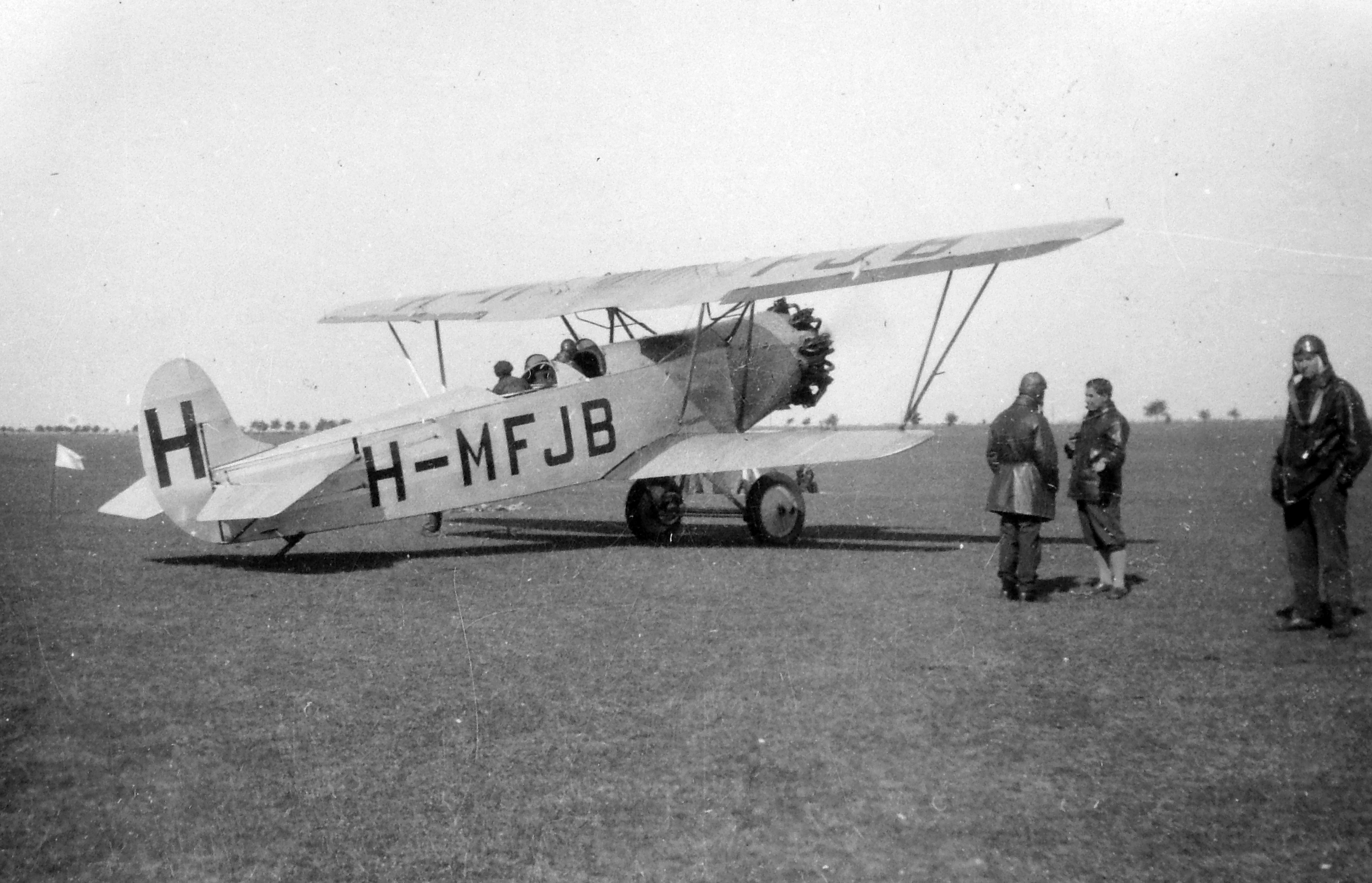
Weiss Manfréd WM-16A in 1933

It was developed from the Fokker C.V, of which 76 served in the Hungarian Air Force. Two major versions were built: The WM-16A, which used a 410 kW (550 hp) Gnome-Rhône 9K Mistral (9 built) and the WM-16B, which used a 641.3 kW (860 hp) Gnome-Rhône 14K Mistral Major (9 built). The WM-16A was considered to be unsuitable for operational service, so the WM-16B was developed as a bomber instead of a reconnaissance aircraft. The WM-16 was used as the basis for the Weiss WM-21 Sólyom. Aircraft were built at the Manfréd Weiss Steel and Metal Works in Csepel, the MÁVAG factory in Budapest, and by the Rába (company) in Győr. Starting in 1941 these aircraft were relegated to secondary duties.

== Specifications (14K engine) ==
Data from Letadla 39–46: Weiss Manfréd WM 16 Budapest

General characteristics

- Crew: 2
- Length: 9.55 m (31 ft 4 in)
- Wingspan: 15.30 m (50 ft 2 in)
- Height: 3.70 m (12 ft 2 in)
- Wing area: 39.30 m^{2} (423.0 sq ft)
- Empty weight: 2,150 kg (4,740 lb)
- Gross weight: 2,600 kg (5,732 lb)
- Powerplant: 1 × Gnome-Rhône 14K Mistral Major 14-cylinder air-cooled radial engine, 640 kW (860 hp)
- Propellers: 3-bladed

Performance

- Maximum speed: 300 km/h (190 mph, 160 kn) at sea level
- Cruise speed: 255 km/h (158 mph, 138 kn)
- Range: 1,000 km (620 mi, 540 nmi)
- Service ceiling: 8,100 m (26,600 ft)

Armament

- Guns:
  - 2 fixed, forward-firing 8 mm Gebauer GEP machine guns
  - 1 flexibly-mounted 8 mm Gebauer GEM machine gun in rear cockpit
- Bombs: 5 × 60 kg (130 lb) bombs

== See also ==
Related development

- Weiss Manfréd WM-10 Ölyv
- Weiss Manfréd WM-21 Sólyom
- Weiss Manfréd WM-23 Ezüst Nyíl

Aircraft of comparable role, configuration, and era

- Aichi D1A
- Curtiss SBC
- Hawker Hart
- Heinkel He 46
- Heinkel He 50
- Henschel Hs 123
- Polikarpov Po-2

Related lists

- List of aircraft of World War II
- List of aircraft of Hungary in World War II
