= A102 =

A102, A.102 or A-102 may refer to:

- A102 road, a road in England
- AS-102, the 1964 second Saturn rocket launch to carry a boilerplate Apollo spacecraft
- Aero A.102, a Czechoslovak fighter aircraft
