= WM21 =

WM21 or WM-21 may refer to:

- WrestleMania 21
- Weiss WM-21 Sólyom
