= MÁVAG Héja =

Hungarian WWII fighter aircraft

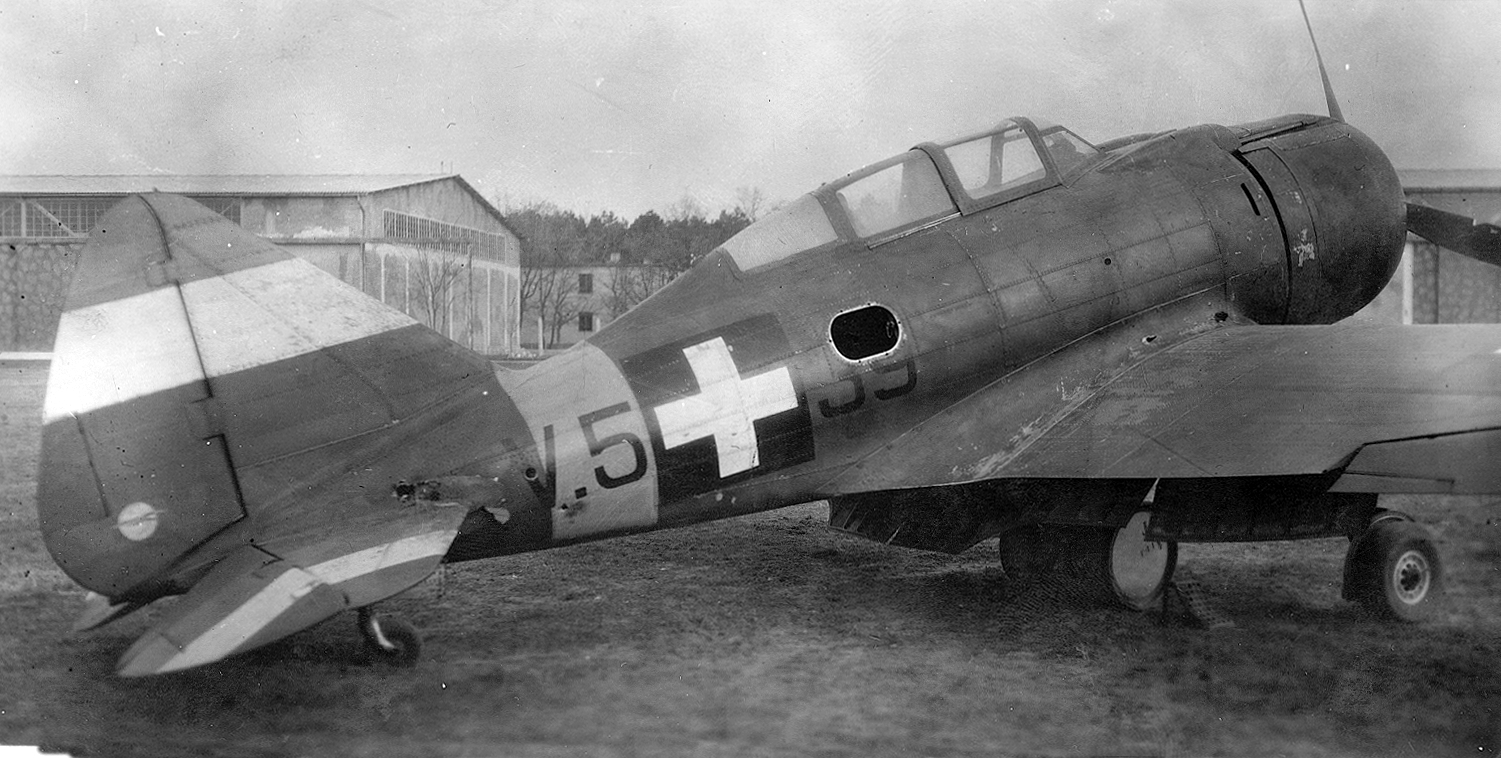
- A MÁVAG Héja II in Hungary, 13 April 1944.

General information
- Type: Fighter
- National origin: Hungary
- Manufacturer: MÁVAG
- Status: Retired
- Primary user: Royal Hungarian Air Force
- Number built: 204 MÁVAG Héja IIs

History
- Introduction date: 1941
- First flight: 1940
- Retired: 1945
- Developed from: Reggiane Re.2000

The MÁVAG Héja ("Hawk") was a Hungarian fighter aircraft of World War II based on the Italian Reggiane Re.2000. The 70 Re.2000s delivered from Italy were converted into MÁVAG Héja Is by being fitted with Hungarian-built Weiss Manfréd WM K-14 engines, armor for the pilot, an additional fuel tank, and being modified in various other ways. The MÁVAG Héja II was an entirely Hungarian-made fighter developed from the Héja I, but with even more changes, including replacing the Italian machine guns with better Hungarian ones and installing a more powerful Hungarian engine.

204 Héja IIs were built by MÁVAG for the Royal Hungarian Air Force (Magyar Királyi Honvéd Légierő, MKHL). Héjas were used in operations against the Soviet Union alongside German units and in the defense of Hungary.

== Design and development ==
Even before the war started, German leaders were reluctant to supply German aircraft to the Royal Hungarian Air Force (Magyar Királyi Honvéd Légierő, MKHL), which was seen to be focused on home defense and the possibility of conflict with neighboring Romania. Furthermore, the deliveries of German aircraft went primarily to front-line formations rather than to home defense units. Moreover, Adolf Hitler held a bad opinion of the Hungarian aviators, expressing this view in early 1942 when Hungary issued another request for German-built fighters. "They would not use the single-seaters against the enemy but just for pleasure flights!... What the Hungarians have achieved in the aviation field to date is more than paltry. If I am going to give some aircraft, then rather to the Croats, who have proved they have an offensive spirit. To date, we have experienced only fiascos with the Hungarians." So, the Hungarian Air Force (MKHL) obtained much of their aircraft from Italy instead. This would change in October 1942, from which point the Germans would give the Hungarians modern German aircraft and their licenses.

On 27 December 1939, seventy Reggiane Re.2000 fighters were purchased from Italy. These were delivered to the Magyar Királyi Állami Vas-, Acél- és Gépgyárak, ("Royal Hungarian State Iron, Steel and Machine Works"), where they were modified into MÁVAG Héja I ("Hawk I") fighters. The original Italian Piaggio P.XI engines were replaced by Hungarian Weiss Manfréd WM K-14 engines driving Hamilton Standard three-bladed, constant-speed propellers instead. The WM K-14 was a licensed derivative of the French Gnome-Rhône 14K engine that necessitated a 1-foot 3-inch (~40 cm) lengthening of the Héja's forward fuselage to restore the center of gravity to a safe position. The Héja I also had armor for the pilot, an additional 100 L fuel tank (in the fuselage, self-sealing), a radio, and other changes differentiating it from the Re.2000. The Piaggio P.XI engine itself was also a derivative of the Gnome-Rhône 14K, but it was less reliable than the original.

However, the aircraft also suffered from a number of drawbacks. The Re.2000s received by Hungary had faulty throttles, machine guns that often jammed or were misaligned, canopy panels that fell out during flight, and wing skin damage. These issues led to one aircraft being lost but were eventually corrected. The wing fuel tanks of the Re.2000s received by Hungary were poorly sealed, with many of them leaking. When these Re.2000s were modified into Héja Is, the wing fuel tanks were left unchanged, so this issue remained, and many flew with constantly leaking fuel tanks. On the Héja II, the larger (often leaking) fuel tanks in the wings were replaced with 22 smaller 20-25 L ones, therefore increasing the manufacturing complexity and weight of the aircraft. Surprisingly, the fuel tank changes noticeably improved the fighter's stability by reducing fuel sloshing in the tank. Yaw stability was poor and the Héja I's predisposition to sideslip was very dangerous at low altitude (killing István Horthy), moreover the subsequent mass increase of the Héja II worsened this issue.

A decision was soon made to produce an improved, domestic version of the Héja I in Hungary. This new aircraft became the MÁVAG Héja II ("Hawk II"). The Héja II was entirely Hungarian with locally produced airframes, engines and armament, which was changed to twin 12.7 mm (0.500 in) Gebauer 1940.M GKM (Gebauer Motorgéppuska 1940.Minta GKM) engine-driven machine guns in the upper cowling with 300 rounds per gun (rpg). These were significantly better than the original Italian 12.7 mm Breda-SAFAT machine guns, as they had a higher rate of fire, a higher muzzle velocity, and were more reliable. The MÁVAG Héja II retained some of the changes from the Héja I and also had a newer, more powerful (1085 hp) Hungarian engine – the WM K-14B, a redesigned cowling, 22 smaller fuel tanks, a larger Hungarian-made Weiss Manfréd propeller, and more changes further differentiating it from the Re.2000. The first production MÁVAG Héja II took to the air on 30 October 1942. A further 203 Héja IIs were built by MÁVAG for the Royal Hungarian Air Force, with the last aircraft being completed on 1 August 1944. According to other sources, between 170 and 203 Héja IIs were constructed.

The Gebauer machine guns are very complicated but advanced vehicle mounted Hungarian machine guns, usually with very high rates of fire. The Gebauer machine guns were designed by Ferenc Gebauer and produced by Danuvia Engineering Industries Rt. The 12.7 mm Gebauer 1940.M GKM is a gas-operated, engine-driven heavy machine gun chambered for 12.7x81mmSR as used by the Italian 12.7 mm Breda-SAFAT heavy machine gun. Synchronized with the propeller, it is installed in pairs in the upper cowling. These guns had a fast rate of fire of 1,000 rounds per minute each. The 1940.M GKM has a muzzle velocity of 800 m/s and is belt fed with 600 rounds for the two guns, giving it 300 rounds per gun (rpg). This machine gun is engine-driven; the crankshaft of the aircraft's engine rotates a number of gears inside the machine gun with the assistance of a crank. The bolt is connected to another crankshaft, which rotates when a locking lever is depressed when the gun fires.

== Operational history ==
The Kingdom of Hungary was an ally of Nazi Germany during World War II, with at least one Hungarian squadron flying the MÁVAG Héja I in combat on the Eastern Front. MÁVAG Héja IIs were not used on the Eastern Front; instead, Héja IIs operated inside Hungary in an air defense role, intercepting bombers or as advanced trainers.

When introduced, the modern Héja was an upgrade over the fighters that Hungary was operating, but eventually, it was replaced by the Bf 109 (F-4 and G variants) when Germany gave Hungary access to them. From October 1942 until the end of the war, Hungarian pilots flew Bf 109s – both those supplied by Germany and those that were license produced in Hungary. The Bf 109 became Hungary's main fighter and bore the brunt of the fighting, while Héjas remained as reserves and trainers.

MÁVAG Héja Is were first sent to Debrecen to strengthen home defenses, as there was a danger that the growing crisis over Transylvania could lead to a conflict with Romania. However, conflict was avoided, and the Héja Is were used on the Eastern Front in the war against the Soviet Union.

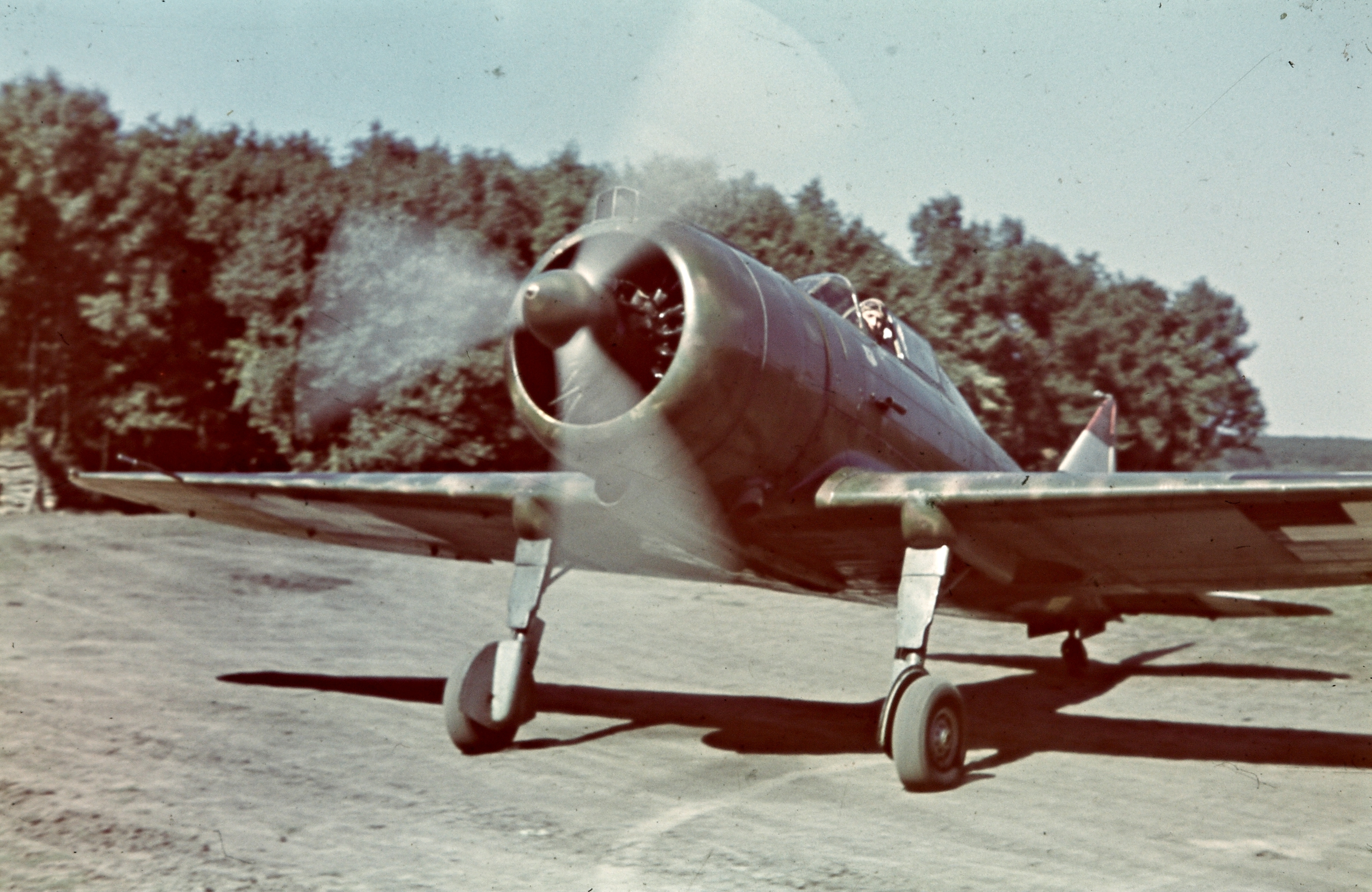
A Héja I in 1942

The first seven MÁVAG Héja Is were sent to the Eastern Front on an experimental basis during the summer/autumn of 1941. Flying alongside the Fiat CR.32s of 1/3 Fighter Company, the Héja I pilots claimed eight kills for one loss during three months of combat against the Soviet Air Force. In the summer of 1942, the Hungarian Air Force contributed with its 1st Repülőcsoport (aviation detachment) to the German offensive Fall Blau. 1/1 Fighter Group (1./I Vadász Osztály), equipped with 13 Héja Is, reached its first front base near Kursk on 2 July. By 3 August, 2/1 FS joined the other Hungarian fighter unit that had moved to Ilovskoye airfield. The task of 2/1 was to escort short-range reconnaissance aircraft, while 1/1 would support bombing missions.

Combat performance against the Soviet Air Force was satisfactory. On 4 August, the Hungarians claimed their first kills, when Ens Vajda shot down two enemy aircraft. The first Hungarian ace of the war, 2/Lt Imre Pánczél, claimed his first air victories while flying the Héja I, three of them in one sortie, in 1942.

The Héja Is had their most successful day on 9 August 1942. That day, near the village of Davidovka, 16 Ilyushin Il-2s and a similar number of LaGG-3s were intercepted by four Héja Is. The Hungarians downed four LaGGs, suffering the loss of the Héja I of Lt Takács, who crash-landed behind his own lines, wounded.

However, the Héja I's flight characteristics were markedly different from the Fiat CR.32, from which Hungarian pilots frequently converted. The Héja I was much more prone to handling difficulties, especially stalls and spins, as well as reliability issues. All of the 24 Héja Is had suffered accidents (minor and major) within a month of combat deployment.

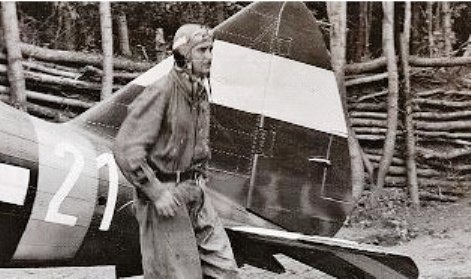
István Horthy with his Héja I, 1942

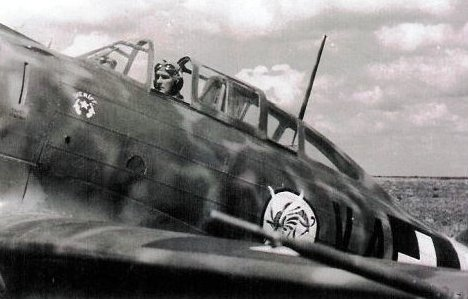
István Horthy in his MÁVAG Héja I

Landing and takeoff accidents were common on the rudimentary Soviet airfields due to the Héja I's unchanged landing gear inherited from the Re.2000. The Re.2000's landing gear was not as rugged and sturdy as the CR.32's gear. After a steel plate was added behind the cockpit for the protection of the pilots, the shift in the aircraft's center of gravity led to more frequent accidents. On 20 August 1942, tragedy struck the Hungarian Regent Miklós Horthy when his eldest son, 37-year-old István Horthy, Deputy Regent of Hungary and a Flight Lieutenant in the reserves, was killed in a crash while flying Héja I V.421 with the 1/3 Fighter Squadron near Ilovskoye. István was very popular in Hungary, was pro-Western, was opposed to the Holocaust and often publicly criticized Nazism, despite Hungary being a part of the Axis. Shortly after takeoff on his 25th operational sortie, after a pilot flying above asked Horthy to increase his altitude, he pulled up too suddenly, stalled and crashed. According to other sources, his aircraft entered a flat spin after he made a turn at low speed to fly in close formation with a He 46 reconnaissance aircraft. Some were convinced that the Germans had sabotaged his aircraft.

Nevertheless, the determined Hungarian pilots kept on flying combat missions with the Héja I and scoring a number of kills against Soviet aircraft. When they managed to force their Soviet opponents into a dogfight, thanks to the great maneuverability of the Héja, the Hungarian pilots were often successful.

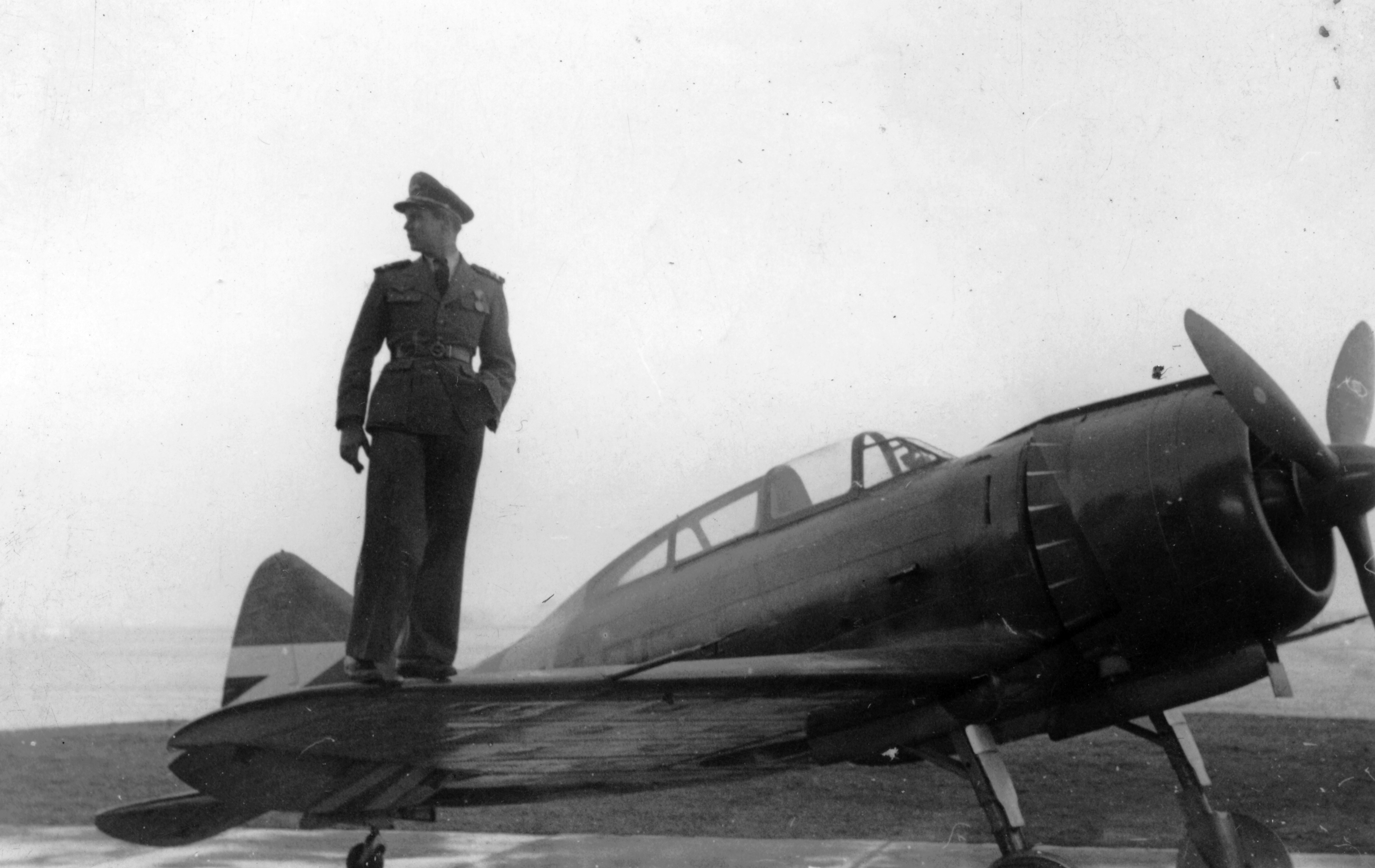
A Hungarian MÁVAG Héja I in 1943

The Héja Is flew their last sorties on the Soviet front on 14 and 15 January 1943, when they took off for uneventful patrols and reconnaissance missions. Between 16 and 19 January, with the Red Army rapidly approaching Ilovskoye airfield, and with no time to heat the engines' frozen oil, mechanics were forced to blow up the last unserviceable Héja Is.

The surviving Héjas were kept in Hungary for home defense. Production of Héja IIs in Hungary continued until August 1944: 98 were completed in 1943 and 72 in 1944, although the aircraft was regarded as no longer suitable for combat against the latest Soviet fighters and was mostly used as a fighter trainer. Hungary requested that an additional 50–100 Re.2000 airframes be manufactured in Italy, as suitable engines and armament could be locally manufactured; additionally, other countries expressed interest, including Finland (100 examples), Portugal (50), Spain, Switzerland and Yugoslavia. However, no airframes were available by then.

By April 1944, the MKHL still deployed four Héja IIs in 1/1 Fighter squadron and four Héja IIs in 1/2, all of them based in Szolnok for home defense duties, along with about 40 Bf 109s and Messerschmitt Me 210s.

On 2 April 1944, 180 bombers from the USAAF 15th Air Force, escorted by 170 fighters, bombed the Danube Aircraft Works and other targets in Budapest. The Hungarian Fighter Control Center on Gellért hill, near Budapest, scrambled one wing of Héjas from 1/1 Fighter squadron, along with 12 Bf 109 Gs and a couple of Messerschmitt Me 210 Ca-1s from the Experimental Air Force Institute (Repülő Kísérleti Intézet, RKI). The Hungarian pilots claimed 11 American aircraft downed, of which six were confirmed, while American pilots claimed 27 Hungarian aircraft shot down. However, later records showed only two Hungarian pilots were killed.

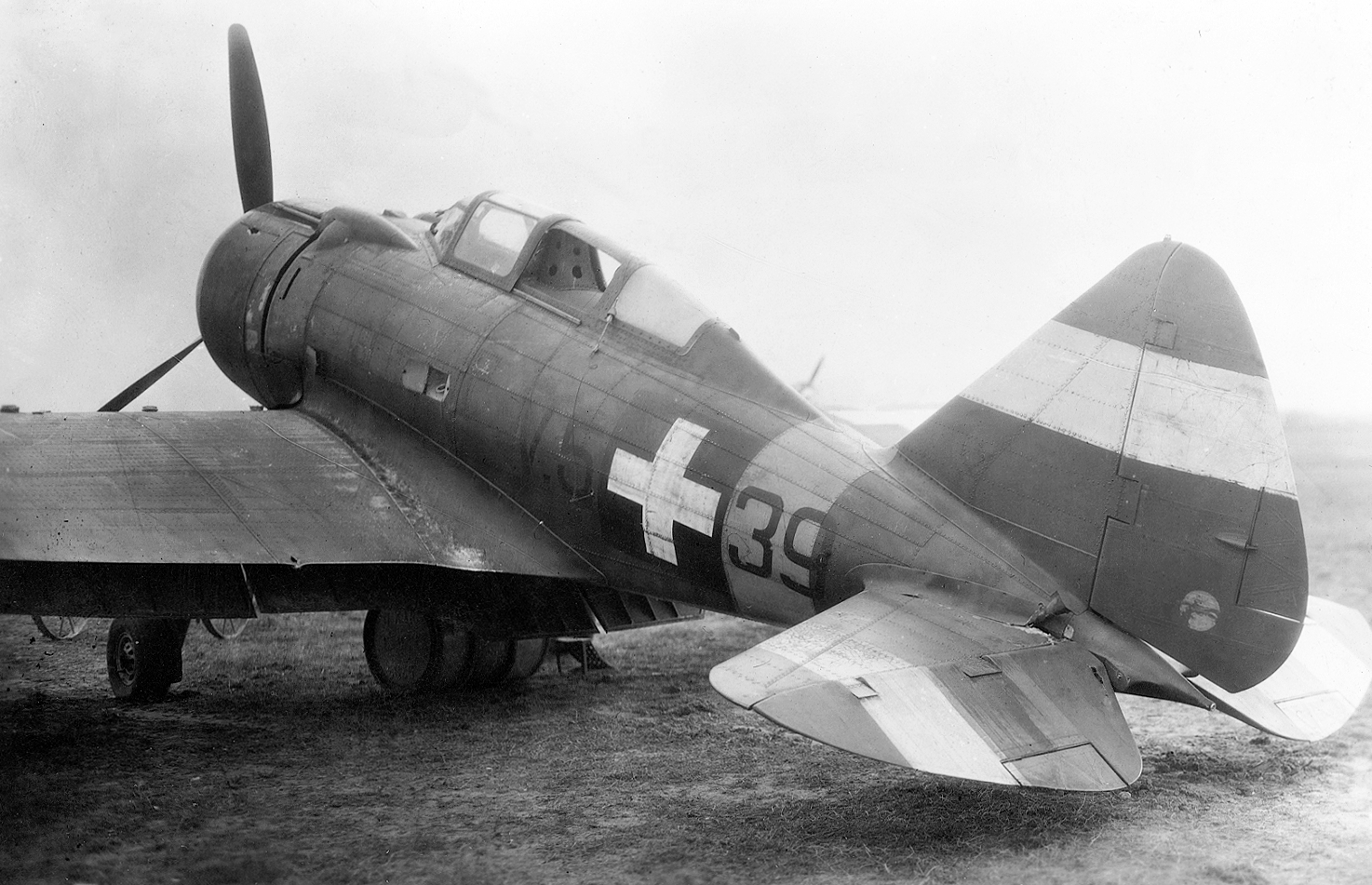
Ferenc Kass' MÁVAG Héja II after it was damaged in combat. Hungary, 13 April 1944

On 13 April 1944, Budapest was attacked by 15th Air Force bombers, accompanied by P-38s from the 1st Fighter Group, led by Lieutenant Alford. Pilots of the P-38s reported the downing of two Re.2001s to the west of Lake Balaton, which were actually MÁVAG Héja IIs. The Americans only damaged one of them.

As the situation for the Axis worsened, American and British bombing raids on Hungarian factories and infrastructure became common and many unfinished Héja IIs were destroyed, having never left the factory. Material shortages also hit Hungary hard, causing many complete Héja IIs to be grounded. A lack of spare parts also meant that many Héja IIs would just have to idly wait for these instead of being used in combat. During the last months of 1944, the 101/6 Training Squadron of the famous 101st Home Air Defence Fighter Wing "Pumas" had six flying Héja IIs. The last official report mentioning Héja IIs was dated 22 February 1945. It concerned a Héja II that crashed during a training flight.

== Variants ==
MÁVAG Héja I ("Hawk I")
Hungarian modified version of the Re.2000. The MÁVAG Héja I had a Hungarian engine, a different propeller, armor for the pilot, an additional 100 L fuel tank (in the fuselage, self-sealing), a radio, a lengthened fuselage, and other changes differentiating it from the Re.2000.
MÁVAG Héja II ("Hawk II")
Entirely Hungarian-produced fighter based on the Re.2000, but heavily modified. The Héja II kept some of the modifications from the Héja I, but also had two better Hungarian 12.7 mm Gebauer 1940.M GKM machine guns with 300 rpg rather than two Italian 12.7 mm Breda-SAFAT machine guns. These Hungarian machine guns had a much higher rate of fire of 1000 rpm and a bit better muzzle velocity at 800 m/s when compared to the Italian machine guns. On top of these changes, the Héja II also had a newer, more powerful Hungarian engine – the WM K-14B, a redesigned cowling, smaller fuel tanks in the wings (22 × 20-25 L ones), a larger Hungarian-made Weiss Manfréd propeller, and more changes. 204 Héja IIs were built.
MÁVAG Héja II Zuhanóbombázó ("Dive Bomber")
MÁVAG Héja II modified with underwing dive brakes powered by Bosch electric motors, a dive-bombing sight, and a centerline bomb rack that could carry either a 250 or 500 kg bomb. 3 converted from Héja II fighters.

== Operators ==
Kingdom of Hungary

- Royal Hungarian Air Force
  - 2 Vadászszázad based at Szolnok
  - Század Héja
  - 1/2.Század 'Keresztes pók'
  - 2/1.Század 'Keresztes pók'
  - 1/1.Vadászszázad
  - 2/1.Vadászszázad
  - 1/1.Század Dongó, Önálló Vadász Osztály (OVO)

== Specifications (MÁVAG Héja II) ==
3-view drawing of the Héja II

Data from The Complete Book of Fighters and Reggiane Fighters in action

General characteristics

- Crew: 1
- Length: 8.39 m (27 ft 6 in)
- Wingspan: 11 m (36 ft 1 in)
- Height: 3.1 m (10 ft 2 in)
- Airfoil: N-38
- Empty weight: 2,070 kg (4,564 lb)
- Gross weight: 2,520 kg (5,556 lb)
- Powerplant: 1 × Weiss Manfréd WM K-14B 14-cylinder air-cooled radial piston engine, 809 kW (1,085 hp) (Note: 694 kW (931 hp) according to The Complete Book of Fighters and 768 kW (1030 hp) according to other sources) (Hungarian license-built derivative of the Gnome-Rhône 14Kfrs Mistral-Major)
- Propellers: 3-bladed Weiss Manfréd, 3.2 m (10 ft 6 in) diameter hydraulically controlled constant-speed propeller

Performance

- Maximum speed: 540 km/h (340 mph, 290 kn) at 4,300 m (14,108 ft) (Note: 520 km/h (323 mph) according to Reggiane Fighters in action)
- Range: 900 km (560 mi, 490 nmi)
- Endurance: 2 hours 30 minutes
- Service ceiling: 8,138 m (26,699 ft)

Armament

- Guns: 2 × 12.7 mm (0.500 in) Gebauer 1940.M GKM engine-driven machine guns in the upper cowling with 300 rounds per gun

== See also ==
- Weiss Manfréd WM-23 Ezüst Nyíl

Related development

- Reggiane Re.2000

Aircraft of comparable role, configuration, and era

- Bloch MB.152
- CAC Boomerang
- Curtiss P-36 Hawk
- Fiat G.50
- Hawker Hurricane
- Heinkel He 112
- IAR 80
- Macchi MC.200
- Messerschmitt Bf 109
- Mitsubishi A6M
- Nakajima Ki-43
- Polikarpov I-180
- PZL.50
- Republic P-43 Lancer
- Rogožarski IK-3
- Seversky P-35

Related lists

- List of aircraft of Hungary in World War II
- List of aircraft of World War II
- List of fighter aircraft
