= Weiss WM-21 Sólyom =

Military plane

WM-21 Sólyom
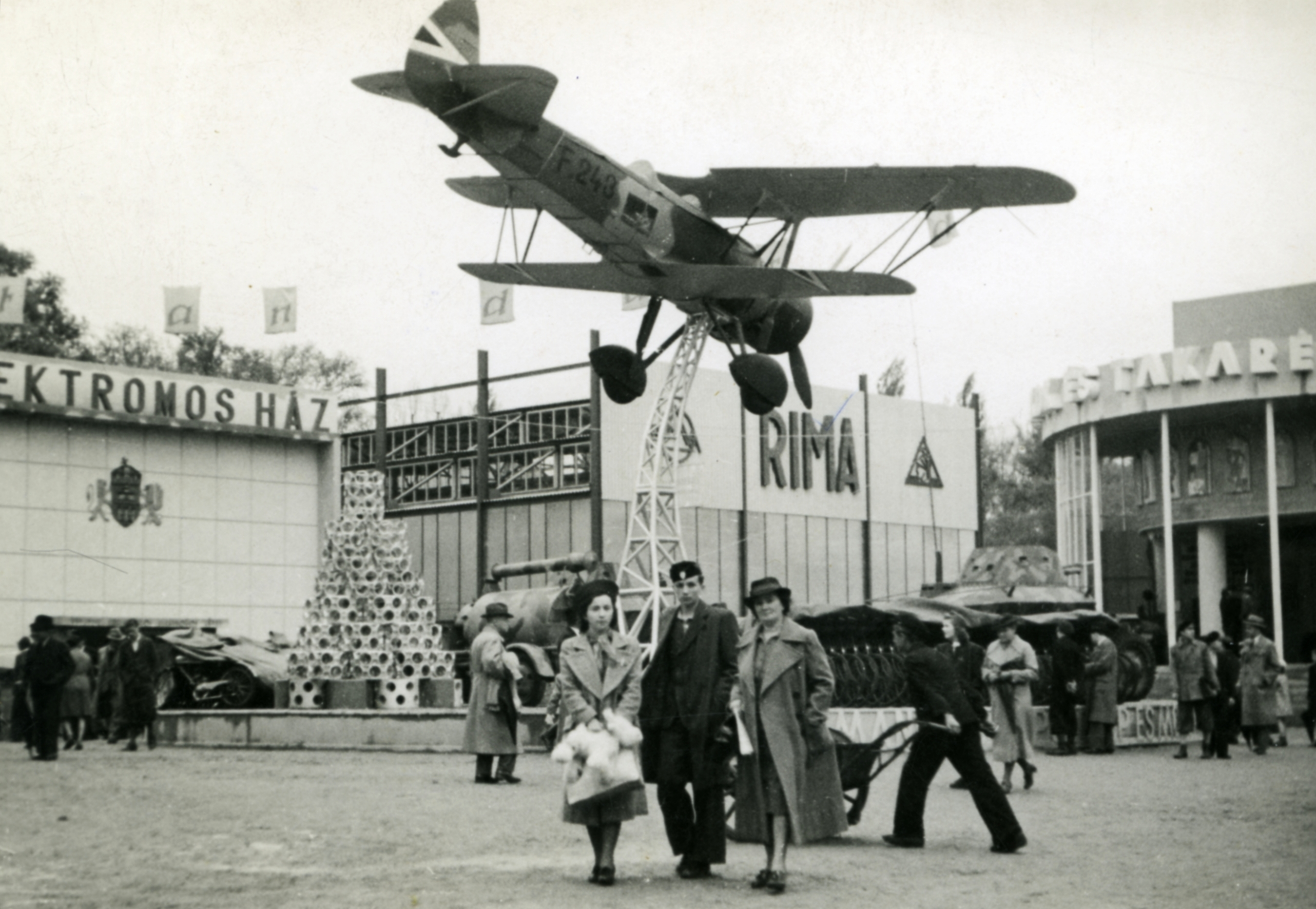

General information
- Type: Light Bomber/Reconnaissance Biplane
- National origin: Hungary
- Manufacturer: Manfréd Weiss
- Primary user: Magyar Királyi Honvéd Légierő
- Number built: 128

History
- Introduction date: 1939
- First flight: 1937
- Retired: 1945
- Developed from: Weiss WM-16 Budapest

The Weiss WM-21 Sólyom (English: Falcon) was a 1930s Hungarian light bomber and reconnaissance biplane which served in World War II and was developed by the Manfred Weiss company.

== Design and development ==
The WM-21 was designed to replace the WM-16, which was based on the yet older Fokker C.V, and as such was considered unsuitable for operational service. The WM-21's structure was strengthened, and the aircraft received a new, more efficient wing set. A tailskid was fitted to allow for shorter landing runs on grass airfields. A conventional biplane, the Sólyom was powered by a 870 hp (649 kW) Weiss WM-K-14A radial engine, and had an open cockpit. A total of 128 aircraft were built by three different factories: 25 by Manfréd Weiss, 43 by MÁVAG, and 60 by MWG.

== Operational history ==
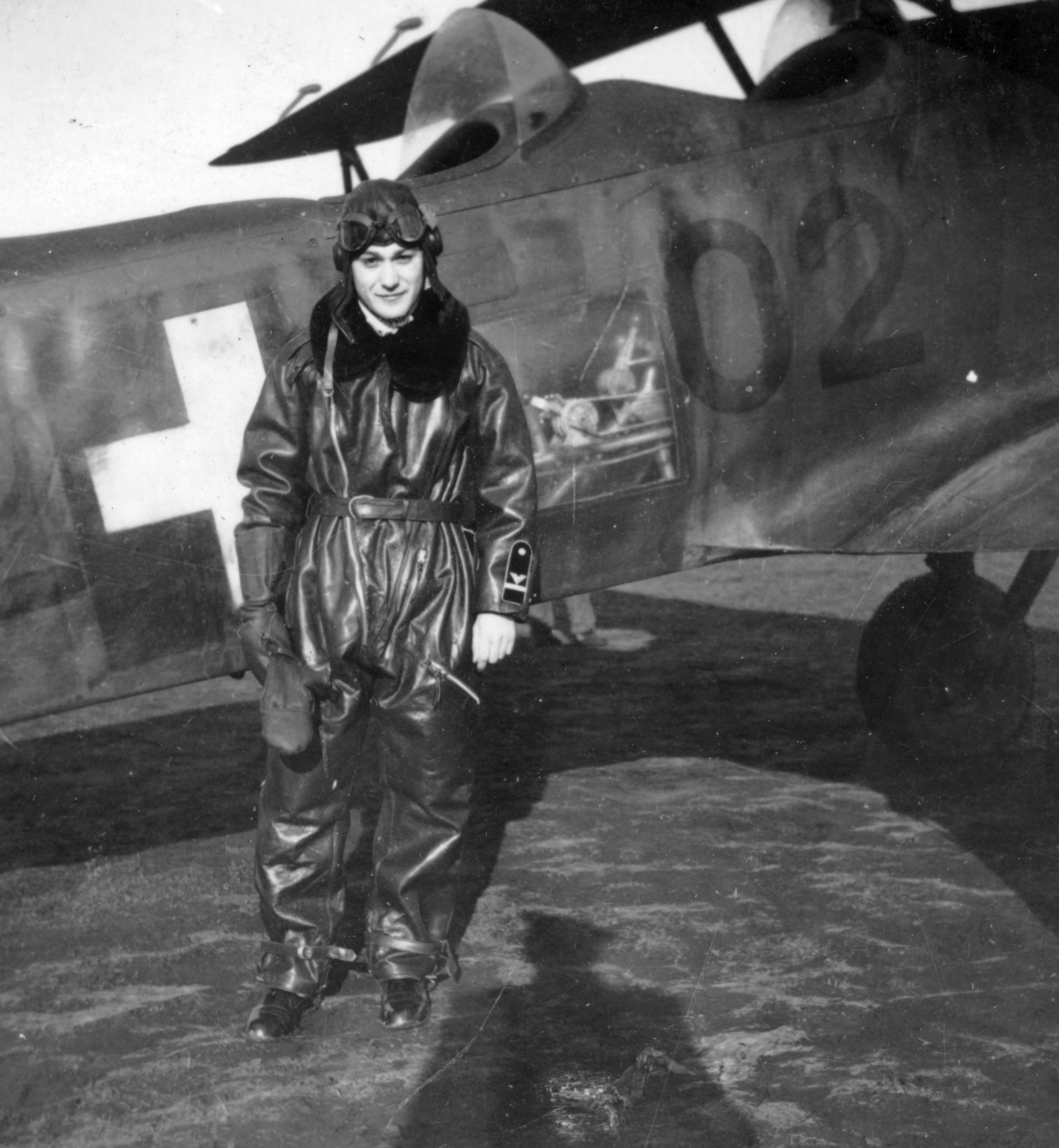
A WM-21 Sólyom in service

Throughout the war, the Royal Hungarian Air Force used 48 of them for reconnaissance. They served alongside 38 Heinkel He 46s, and 37 IMAM Ro.37s, supplemented by 13 Heinkel He 111s. They first entered service in 1939 with short-range reconnaissance units. Although they were active during the 1940 dispute with Romania, their first active operational use was during the Axis invasion of Yugoslavia in April 1941.

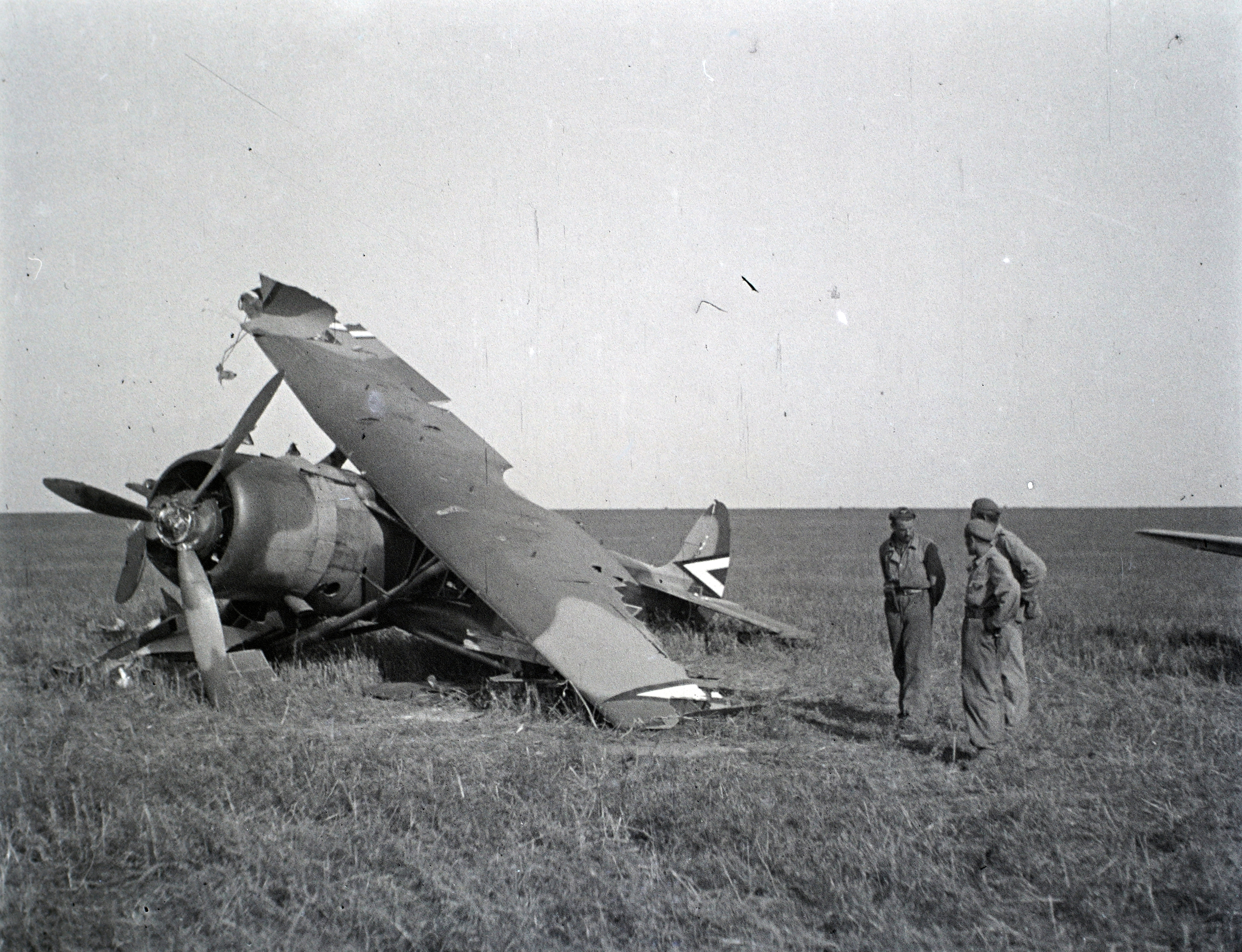
A crashed WM-21 Sólyom in Pécs 1941

During the invasion of Yugoslavia, none of the WM-21s were lost in combat, but one was lost in an accident. From June 1941 they were used to support Hungarian Army units in Ukraine, and then against Soviet partisans. They lost another WM-21 on 29 June, when the war against the Soviet Union was intensifying. Around 80 aircraft were also transferred to duties as trainers, as they were removed from operational use, until 1945.

== Operators ==
Kingdom of Hungary

- Royal Hungarian Air Force

== Specifications ==

Data from

General characteristics

- Crew: 2
- Length: 9.64 m (31 ft 8 in)
- Upper wingspan: 12.90 m (42 ft 4 in)
- Lower wingspan: 9.40 m (30 ft 10 in)
- Height: 3.5 m (11 ft 6 in)
- Empty weight: 2,300 kg (5,071 lb)
- Gross weight: 3,400 kg (7,496 lb)
- Powerplant: 1 × Weiss WM-K-14A radial, 650 kW (870 hp)

Performance

- Maximum speed: 320 km/h (200 mph, 170 kn)
- Range: 750 km (470 mi, 400 nmi)

Armament

- Guns: 2 × 7.92 mm (0.31 in) forward-firing Gebauer 1926/31.M machine guns
  1 × 7.92 mm (0.31 in) Gebauer 1934/37.M defensive rear machine gun
- Bombs: 12 × 10kg (22 lb) Anti-personnel bombs or 60 × 1kg (2.2 lb) incendiary bombs

== See also ==
Related development

- Weiss Manfréd WM-10 Ölyv
- Weiss Manfréd WM-16 Budapest
- Weiss Manfréd WM-23 Ezüst Nyíl

Aircraft of comparable role, configuration, and era

- Aichi D1A
- Curtiss SBC
- Hawker Hart
- Heinkel He 46
- Heinkel He 50
- Henschel Hs 123
- Polikarpov Po-2

Related lists

- List of aircraft of World War II
- List of aircraft of Hungary in World War II
- List of Hungarian military equipment of World War II
