= Alvis Pelides =

1930s British piston aircraft engine

Pelides
- Rear view of the Alvis Pelides
- Type: Radial aero engine
- Manufacturer: Alvis
- First run: 1936
- Major applications: Not flown
- Number built: 15
- Developed from: Gnome-Rhône Mistral Major

The Alvis Pelides was an unflown British air-cooled radial aero engine first developed in 1936. The Pelides Major was a projected but unbuilt development as were the Alcides, Alcides Major and the Maeonides Major, the Alvis aircraft engine range taking their names from Greek mythology.

== Design and development ==
The Pelides was the first aero engine of Alvis design; the company had previously only built the French Gnome-Rhône Mistral Major under license. With the two companies working closely together the 14 cylinder radial layout of this engine retained metric dimensions but substituted metric screw threads with British fasteners such as BSF and Whitworth. Material specifications were different as were the detail design of internal parts such as the crankpin. The Pelides passed a 50-hour Air Ministry type test in 1937 where it produced 1,065 hp (794 kW) but no aircraft application was found and only 15 engines were built. The onset of the Second World War caused the abandonment of any further development of the Pelides and its related designs.

== Variants (projected) ==
Pelides
1,000 / 1,050 hp (750 / 780 kW) 2-row 14-cylinder radial, 5.75 in × 6.5 in (146 mm × 165 mm) (bore x stroke), 38.67 L (2,359.79 cu in), LH or RH, d/d, 13:19 or 0.5:1.
Pelides Major
The Pelides Major was a version retaining the same dimensions as the Pelides but with improvements to the supercharger, only built in small quantities for testing at 1,000 hp (750 kW).
Alcides
The Alcides of 1937 was a powerful supercharged 18-cylinder two-row radial engine, with a power output of 1,650 / 1,725 hp (1,230 / 1,286 kW). 2-row 18-cylinder radial, 5.75 in × 7.09 in (146 mm × 180 mm) (bore x stroke), 54.24 L (3,309.93 cu in), LH or RH, d/d, 13:19 or 0.5:1.
Alcides Major
The Alcides Major was an improved supercharged version of the Alcides.
Maeonides Major
Also designed in 1937, the supercharged Maeonides Major was effectively a smaller version of the Pelides with a power output of 680 hp (510 kW). 2-row 14-cylinder radial, 4.803 in × 4.567 in (122.0 mm × 116.0 mm) (bore x stroke), 18.98 L (1,158.23 cu in), LH or RH, 5:7.

== Specifications (Pelides) ==
Data from Lumsden and Flight

=== General characteristics ===
- Type: 14-cylinder 2 row supercharged air-cooled radial piston engine
- Bore: 5.75 inch (146 mm)
- Stroke: 6.5 inch (165 mm)
- Displacement: 2,359.8 cu in (38.7 L)
- Diameter: 52 in (1321 mm)
- Dry weight: 1,190 lb (540 kg)

=== Components ===
- Valvetrain: Two pushrod-actuated poppet valves per cylinder with sodium-cooled exhaust valve.
- Supercharger: Single speed, single stage
- Fuel system: Heated Zenith carburettor
- Fuel type: Petrol, 87 Octane
- Oil system: Dry sump
- Cooling system: Air-cooled.

=== Performance ===
- Power output: 1,000 hp (746 kW) at 2,400 rpm (rated power)
- Compression ratio: 5.5:1
- Power-to-weight ratio: 0.84 hp/lb (1.4 kW/kg)

== See also ==
Related development

- Gnome-Rhône Mistral Major

Comparable engines

- BMW 801
- Fiat A.74
- Mitsubishi Kinsei
- Nakajima Sakae
- Shvetsov ASh-82
- Wright R-2600

Related lists

- List of aircraft engines
