= Aero A.102 =

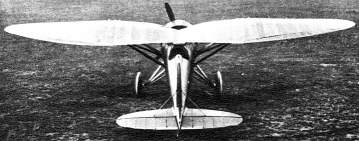

General information
- Type: Fighter aircraft
- Manufacturer: Aero Vodochody
- Primary user: Czech Air Force

History
- Introduction date: n/a
- First flight: 1934

The Aero A.102 was a Czechoslovak fighter aircraft that flew in prototype form in 1934. It was developed in response to a Czech Air Force requirement of that year, but was passed over in favour of the Avia B.35.

The A.102 was of gull winged monoplane configuration with tailwheel undercarriage, and was perhaps inspired by the successful PZL P.11.

== Specifications (A.102) ==
Data from The Complete Book of Fighters

General characteristics

- Crew: 1
- Length: 7.30 m (23 ft 11 in)
- Wingspan: 11.50 m (37 ft 9 in)
- Wing area: 18.50 m^{2} (199.1 sq ft)
- Empty weight: 1,478 kg (3,258 lb)
- Gross weight: 2,036 kg (4,489 lb)
- Powerplant: 1 × Walter-built Gnome-Rhône 14Kfs Mistral Major radial engine, 600 kW (800 hp)

Performance

- Maximum speed: 434 km/h (270 mph, 234 kn)
- Range: 670 km (420 mi, 360 nmi)
- Time to altitude: 5.8 min to 5,000 m (16,405 ft)

Armament

- Guns: 4× 7.92 mm (0.312 in) ZB vz. 30 machine guns

== See also ==
Aircraft of comparable role, configuration, and era

- PZL P.24

Related lists

- List of fighter aircraft
