= Weiss Manfréd WM-23 Ezüst Nyíl =

Hungarian WWII fighter aircraft

WM-23
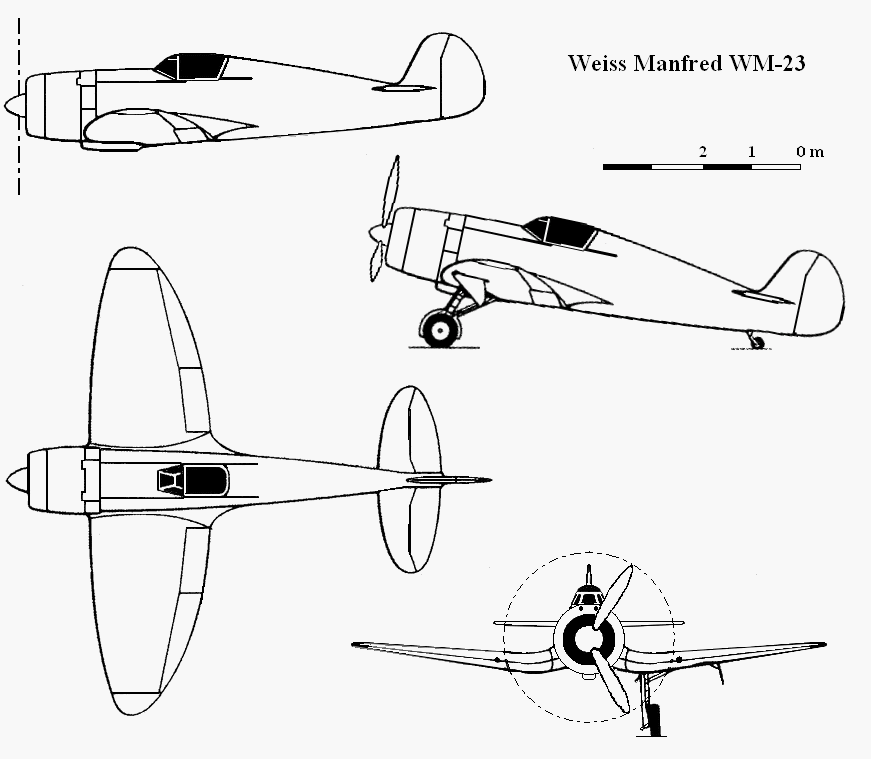
- Schematic drawing of the WM-23

General information
- Type: Fighter
- National origin: Hungary
- Manufacturer: Weiss Manfréd
- Designer: Samu Béla and team
- Status: Cancelled
- Primary user: Royal Hungarian Air Force (MKHL)
- Number built: 1

History
- First flight: Early 1941
- Developed into: WM-123 Ezüst Nyíl II

The Weiss Manfréd WM-23 Ezüst Nyíl ("Silver Arrow") was a Hungarian fighter aircraft of World War II developed by the Manfréd Weiss Steel and Metal Works. Designed by Samu Béla and his team, the WM-23 was an entirely Hungarian design with retractable landing gear, a three-bladed variable-pitch propeller, a closed canopy, inverted gull wings and an elliptical low-wing design. Development started in summer 1939 with one prototype produced and test flown. Demonstrating good flying characteristics and generally being considered an excellent design, the WM-23 was planned to enter mass production. However, the prototype was destroyed on 21 April 1942, and by this time the MÁVAG Héja fighter was being used which acceptably filled the intended role of the WM-23. Therefore, it was decided to not allocate further resources to completing the project, and to cancel it.

== Origins ==
=== Hungary's need for a modern fighter ===
After the end of the First World War, the Hungarians had serious restrictions placed on their military under the Treaty of Trianon. One of the terms included in the treaty forbade Hungary from having an air force. However, under the cover of civilian flying clubs, a secret air arm was gradually established. In the 1930s, Hungary was more and more openly opposing this treaty and following the Bled agreement in 1938, the existence of the Royal Hungarian Air Force (Magyar Királyi Honvéd Légierő, MKHL) was made known.

The backbone of the MKHL's fighter force was initially made up of many Fiat CR.32 biplane fighters which the MKHL had secretly acquired in 1935-1936 (before the MKHL officially existed). In mid 1938, the MKHL ordered many Fiat CR.42 biplane fighters, whilst they were aware that biplanes were becoming obsolete, they needed to rapidly equip their fighter units. Therefore, once the Hungarian fighter units had fighters to fly, the priority of the MKHL was to acquire modern military aircraft. The MKHL looked to Germany for this, however the Germans were unwilling to sell their most modern and capable aircraft and would only sell aircraft that they weren't using or those that were more outdated and obsolete. The Hungarians considered and eventually chose the available Heinkel He 112B, as it was still a capable fighter at the time, only being available because it had narrowly lost the German fighter competition to the Messerschmitt Bf 109.

=== The beginning of the WM-23 ===
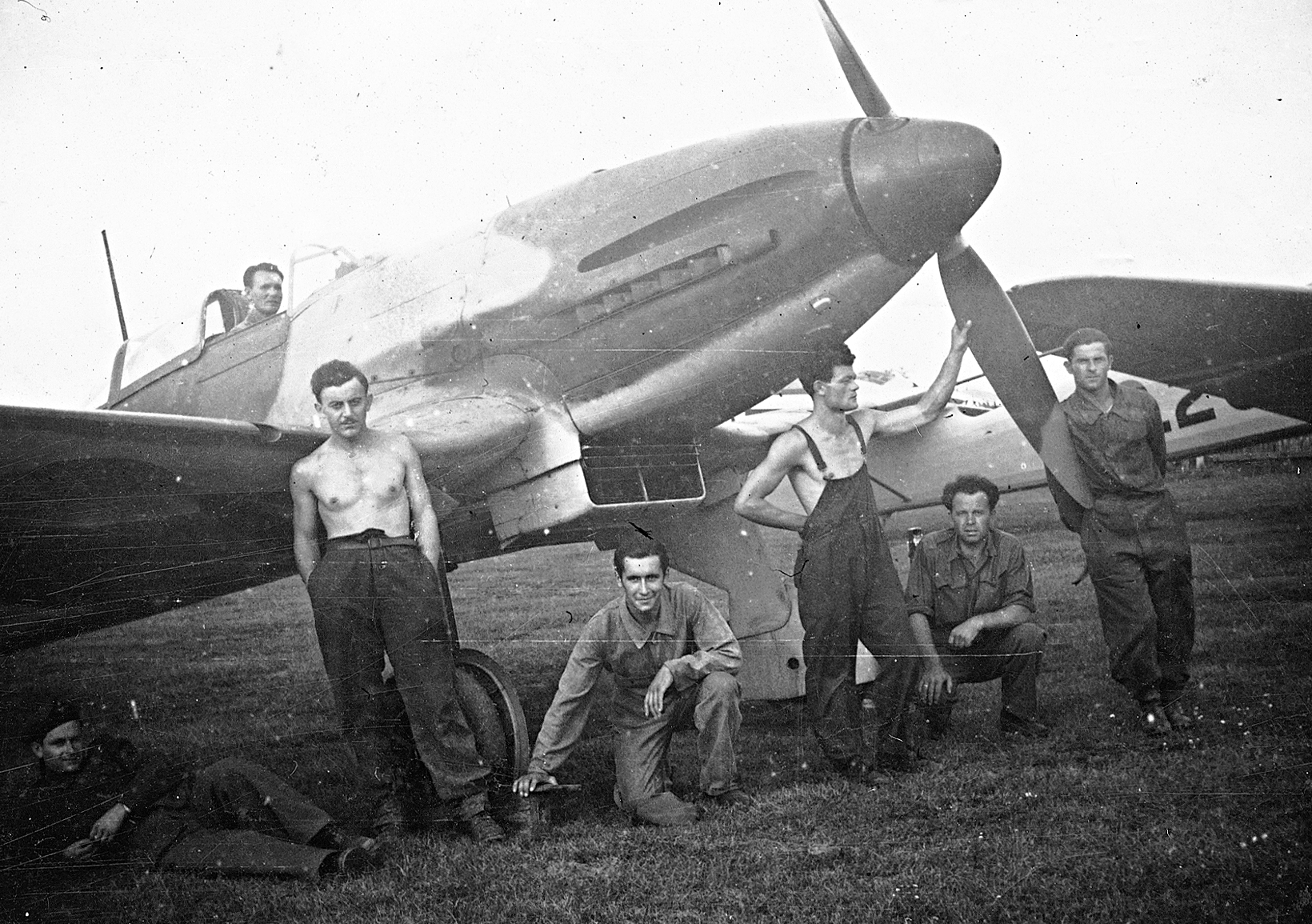
A Hungarian He 112B-1 in 1940

On 7 September 1938, Hungary ordered 36 Heinkel He 112B fighters. Unfortunately for the Hungarians, this order would be plagued with issues. Not only was Hungary at the back of the queue, the Germans also prioritised Luftwaffe orders over export orders and on top of that, the Germans deliberately delayed fulfilling Hungary's order for political reasons. In early 1939, a demonstrator He 112B (V9) arrived in Hungary but crashed during a demonstration flight. A new He 112B was then sent, but as the Hungarian pilots flew the aircraft, they soon noticed that the engine – a Junkers Jumo 210 – was underpowered, only allowing them to reach a top speed of 430 km/h. With the Japanese and Spanish orders fulfilled, it seemed Hungary's order would be next, but then Romania placed an order and was put at the front of the queue. With all of these delays, it seemed Hungary would never get the fighters so the Hungarians asked for the licence to produce the He 112B and received it in May 1939. However, to address the underpowered engines, the Hungarians continually attempted to obtain the licence for one of the newer, more powerful engines such as the Junkers Jumo 211, but the Germans refused to hand over the licence for any of the improved engines and so licensed production never happened, with the He 112 licence eventually being cancelled in December. From the initial order of 36, Hungary only received three He 112 B-1s (not including the demonstrator that crashed), and even these came with the 20 mm cannons removed and the underpowered engines. The Germans never fulfilled the order, so the Hungarians looked elsewhere for modern fighters.

In the first half of 1939, possibly as a result of the He 112B contract having difficulties, the Hungarians decided to produce a domestic fighter design. The new aircraft was to have performance similar to or better than modern fighter aircraft of other nations, namely the Curtiss P-36, Seversky P-35, Hawker Hurricane, Polikarpov I-16, Heinkel He 112, and the contemporary versions of the Messerschmitt Bf 109 (which was the D variant in 1939). The aircraft was designated WM-23 Ezüst Nyíl and was designed by the Hungarian company Weiss Manfréd.

== Design and development ==
=== Engine, propeller and cockpit ===
3-view drawing of the WM-23

The design of the WM-23 began in the summer of 1939 and it was designed by Samu Béla with Marton Vilmos, Milcsevics Tibor, Pap Márton, Pavláth Jeno and others. The prototype was completed by the end of 1940. The WM-23 was powered by the Weiss Manfréd WM K-14B – a 1,030 hp (768 kW), 14-cylinder, two-row, air-cooled radial engine. The WM K-14B was a licensed, modified version of the Gnome-Rhône 14Kfrs Mistral-Major radial. The WM-23's engine had a close-fitting NACA-type cowling and the engine would drive a three-bladed variable-pitch metal VDM (some sources say Hamilton-Standard) propeller. The efficient cooling of the engine was ensured by the use of cowl flaps; these could be opened or closed by the pilot using manual controls. The canopy of the aircraft was rearward-sliding and the view from the cockpit was very good. An R-13 radio device, for a 24 V network, with a long antenna was to be installed, although it was not installed on the prototype so the aircraft could be tested and flown sooner.

=== Wings, landing gear and fuselage ===
The WM-23 had wooden, plywood skinned wings with a low-wing design and had camber-changing Fowler flaps. The wings had a subtle inverted-gull wing shape when viewed from the front, and an elliptical shape when viewed from above. According to the calculations made by the engineers, this design not only made the wings robust, but also greatly improved the aircraft's flight performance and controllability. The aircraft's manoeuvrability also promised to be excellent. At the wing root, the chord length was 2.5 m long and the airfoil was a NACA 23018 which transitioned to a NACA 23012 main airfoil until the end of the wing where it tapered to a NACA 23009 airfoil. With a conventional landing gear design, the main undercarriage legs joined to the lowest part of the wings and folded outwards to fully lie within the wing profile. Originally Samu Béla had planned for the landing gear to fold inwards to lie within the fuselage, but factory manager Korbuly László insisted on the landing gear folding outwards – this was chosen to avoid the heat from the engine damaging the rubber of the tyres. The tailwheel was also retractable. The fuselage was made of a welded steel tube structure with plywood skinning.

=== Issues during development ===
During testing a few issues arose with the prototype. Firstly, the cooling of the engine did not prove to be efficient enough, despite the modern mechanism used. This led to the powerful engine quickly overheating, so a part of the nose had to be redesigned. Furthermore, there were problems with the landing gear retraction and the brake system also had to be repaired. Finally the aircraft had serious problems with vibrations in various places, especially the ailerons and especially at high speeds. After countless investigations and tests, the problem was partially solved when the exhaust system was redesigned, causing the vibration at lower speeds to disappear, although at high speeds the aircraft would still vibrate.

== Armament ==
=== The WM-23's armament ===
The WM-23 prototype did not have guns or bombs installed in order to test fly the aircraft as soon as possible, however the planned armament was two 12.7 mm Gebauer 1940.M GKM machine guns in the upper cowling and two 8 mm Gebauer 1939.M machine guns in the wings. The two 12.7 mm Gebauer 1940.M GKM machine guns in the upper cowling might have been replaced by two 20 mm Mauser MG 151 cannons later on during development. The WM-23 would have most likely had 300 rpg for the 12.7 mm guns and 500 (possibly 600) rpg for the 8 mm guns. Whilst the WM-23 was designed as a fighter, and this would have been its primary role, it was planned to carry 20 kg bomb(s) making it capable of performing ground attack roles.

=== Gebauer machine gun details ===
The Gebauer machine guns are very complicated but advanced vehicle mounted, gas-operated Hungarian machine guns, usually with very high rates of fire. Many Gebauer machine guns are engine-driven; the crankshaft of the aircraft's engine rotates a number of gears inside the machine gun with the assistance of a crank. The bolt is connected to another crankshaft, which rotates when a locking lever is depressed when the gun fires. The Gebauer machine guns were designed by Ferenc Gebauer and produced by Danuvia Engineering Industries Rt.

The 12.7 mm Gebauer 1940.M GKM is a gas-operated, engine-driven heavy machine gun chambered for 12.7x81mmSR as used by the Italian 12.7 mm Breda-SAFAT heavy machine gun. Synchronised with the propeller, it is installed in pairs in the upper cowling and is driven via the crankshaft of the aircraft's engine. These guns had a fast rate of fire of 1,000 rounds per minute each. The 1940.M GKM has a muzzle velocity of 800 m/s and is belt fed with 600 rounds for the two guns, giving it 300 rounds per gun (rpg). Considering the Hungarian MÁVAG Héja had two of these guns in the cowling with 300 rpg, the WM-23 would likely also have had 300 rpg for its 12.7 mm guns.

The 8 mm Gebauer 1939.M is a wing mounted, gas-operated machine gun. It has a very high rate of fire of 2000 rounds per minute, (Note: The rate of fire reached as high as 2038 rpm during testing.) a muzzle velocity of 730 m/s, and is chambered for 8×56mmR. It uses a 500 round belt, giving it 500 rounds per gun. However according to a different source, it could use a 600 round belt (giving it 600 rpg). The WM-23 would have likely had 500 or 600 rounds per gun for its 8 mm guns.

== The prototype and the fate of the WM-23 ==
One prototype was made, which was completed by the end of 1940 and it bore V.501 as its serial number. The prototype had a silver-grey colour with a smooth surface, and looked like a fast plane with an aerodynamic shape, hence it received the name "Ezüst Nyíl" ("Silver Arrow"). The exact date of the WM-23's first flight is not perfectly clear, but it was likely first flown between February and March 1941 (some sources say 23 February 1941, and this seems realistic). During test flights it demonstrated very good acceleration and good flying characteristics, reaching a maximum speed of 530 km/h – significantly better than the 430 km/h maximum speed of the He 112Bs given to Hungary.

On 21 April 1942, whilst test flying the aircraft at maximum speed over Tököl, test pilot Sándor Boskovits noticed the usual vibration at high speeds the prototype suffered from intensify, resulting in the starboard (right) aileron breaking off at an altitude of 3000 m. This was a serious problem and soon the aircraft became uncontrollable (and got into a spin according to some sources), despite this the pilot managed to bail out of the aircraft. Boskovits landed safely thanks to his parachute, but the aircraft crashed into the Tököl forest and was completely destroyed.

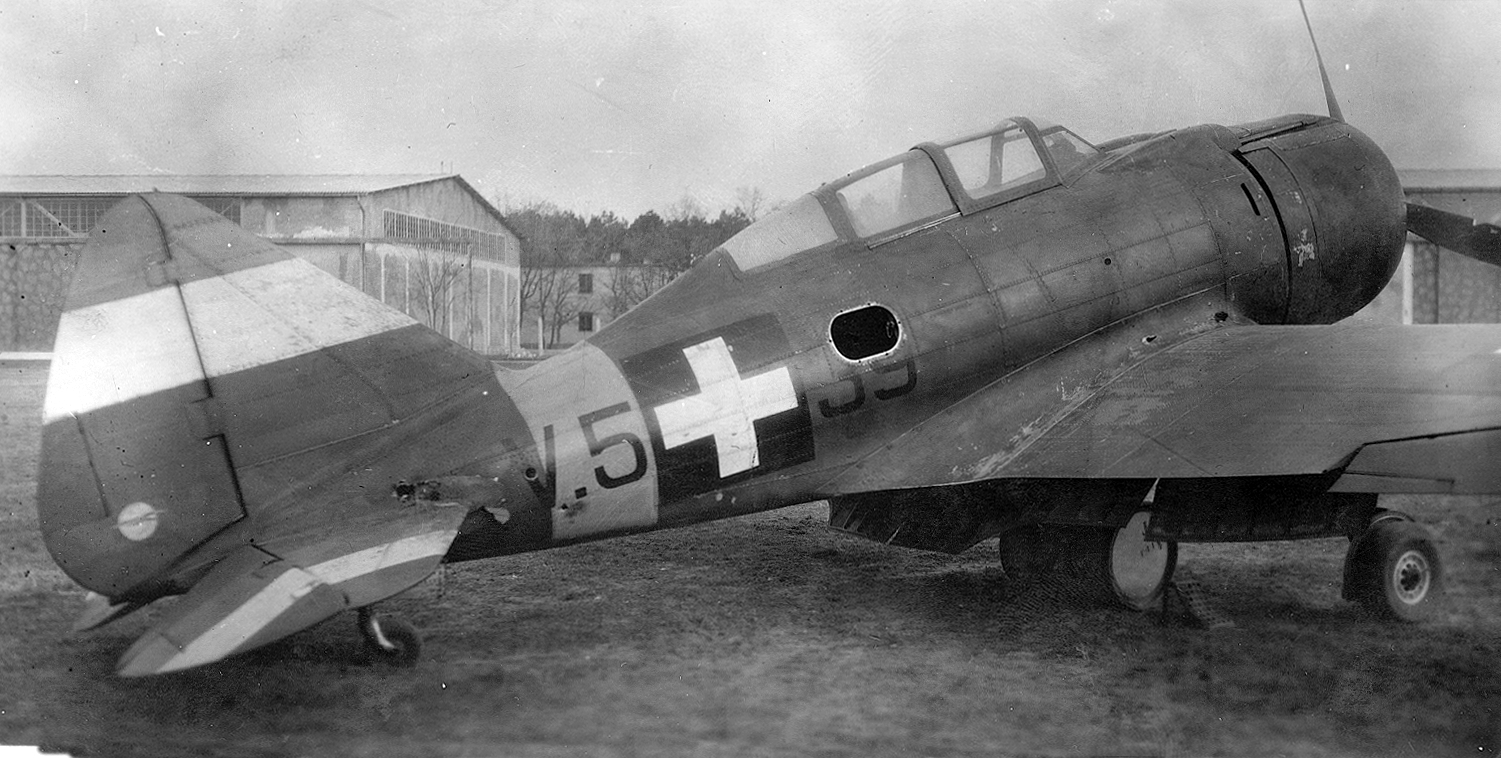
A Hungarian MÁVAG Héja II. It used the same 12.7 mm guns as the WM-23, one of which can be seen above the cowling. The Héja II was produced instead of the WM-23.

Prior to the crash, the WM-23 was planned to enter mass production, however after the crash, the situation was different. By this time the MÁVAG Héja fighter was in use, and it acceptably filled the intended role of the WM-23. Furthermore, Hungarian licence production of the more powerful Messerschmitt Bf 109 (F-4 and G series) was in sight, and now the only prototype of the WM-23 was lost. In this situation, there was not much point in allocating further resources to completing the project, as a new prototype would need to be made, further development would need to be done to resolve the high speed vibration problems the aircraft still suffered from, and production would need to actually begin. All of this would take some time, and since the WM-23 had similar performance to the Héja and inferior performance to the Bf 109F-4 and G series, by the time the WM-23 would be introduced, it would provide no major benefit over the Héja and would soon be replaced by the Bf 109. This would be a huge waste of resources and so the WM-23 project was cancelled.

It can be said that the WM-23 project was cancelled because the engineers took too long trying to find the causes of the vibrations and could not eliminate them fully. As such, the aircraft was never fully ready for mass production and had to keep being tested and investigated, eventually leading to its crash. Since this occurred so late, similarly or more capable fighters were becoming available so the WM-23 was no longer a modern enough design to warrant more resources being invested into completing the project.

== Variants ==
Plans for an improved version of the WM-23 Ezüst Nyíl, referred to as the WM-123 Ezüst Nyíl II had reached an advanced stage before being cancelled. An all-metal fighter aircraft with a monocoque fuselage, the Ezüst Nyíl II would have a powerful 1475 hp (1100 kW) DB 605 engine and would be armed with cannons (most likely 20 mm MG 151s). The Ezüst Nyíl II was planned to be introduced in 1943, but the project was eventually cancelled.

Around this time, Hungary acquired the licence to build the reputable Messerschmitt Bf 109 in Hungary. This may have been why the project was cancelled. After acquiring the licence for the Bf 109, it would have been pointless to waste years and lots of resources developing and testing the WM-123 Ezüst Nyíl II, since it had the same DB 605 engine and cannons as the already tested Bf 109G. The Bf 109G would go on to become the backbone of the Hungarian air force in the latter half of the war.

Two-seat reconnaissance, ground attack and training variants were also designed with the 870 hp (649 kW) WM K-14A engines being used instead. It is not perfectly clear which variant was referred to as what, but the WM 22B (or WM 23B) seems to have been the reconnaissance variant and the WM 23G was either the training or ground attack variant. These variants were also not developed further.

== Specifications (WM-23) ==
Data from Hungarian Fighter Colours – 1930-1945: Volume 2, Magyar fejlesztések a II. világháborúban és a Magyar Királyi Honvédség haditechnikája, and A WM–23 magyar kísérleti vadászrepülőgép 1940–1942

General characteristics

- Crew: 1
- Length: 9.12 m (29 ft 11 in)
- Wingspan: 9.6 m (31 ft 6 in)
- Height: 3.3 m (10 ft 10 in)
- Wing area: 18.5 m^{2} (199 sq ft)
- Airfoil: root: NACA 23018; tip: NACA 23009
- Empty weight: 2,200 kg (4,850 lb)
- Gross weight: 2,600 kg (5,732 lb)
- Max takeoff weight: 3,290 kg (7,253 lb)
- Fuel capacity: at least 300 kg (660 lb)
- Powerplant: 1 × Weiss Manfréd WM K-14B 14-cylinder two-row air-cooled radial piston engine, 768 kW (1,030 hp)
- Propellers: 3-bladed variable-pitch propeller

Performance

- Maximum speed: 530 km/h (330 mph, 290 kn)
- Cruise speed: 472 km/h (293 mph, 255 kn)
- Range: 600 km (370 mi, 320 nmi)
- Service ceiling: 9,600 m (31,500 ft)
- Rate of climb: 16.7 m/s (3,290 ft/min) (calculated from 1000 m/min)
- Time to altitude: 6,000 m (20,000 ft) in 6 minutes
- Wing loading: 140 kg/m^{2} (29 lb/sq ft)
- Power/mass: 0.295 kW/kg (0.179 hp/lb)
- Take-off run: 250 m (820 ft)

Armament

- Guns: ** 2 × 12.7 mm (.50 in) synchronized Gebauer 1940.M GKM machine guns in the upper cowling, likely with 300 rpg (Note: The 2 × 12.7 mm guns might have been replaced later on during development by 2 × 20 mm (.78 in) synchronized Mauser MG 151/20 cannons in the upper cowling)
  - 2 × 8 mm (.31 in) Gebauer 1939.M machine guns in the wings, likely with 500 or 600 rpg
- Bombs: 20 kg (44 lb) bomb(s)

Avionics
R-13 radio

== See also ==
Hungarian military aircraft from the same era

- Weiss Manfréd WM-16 Budapest
- Weiss Manfréd WM-21 Sólyom
- MÁVAG Héja
- Varga RMI-1 X/H

Aircraft of comparable role, configuration, and era

- Bell P-39 Airacobra
- Bloch MB.150
- CAC Boomerang
- Curtiss P-36 Hawk
- Dewoitine D.520
- Fiat G.50
- Grumman F4F Wildcat
- Hawker Hurricane
- Heinkel He 100
- IAR 80
- Kawasaki Ki-61
- Lavochkin LaGG-3
- Lavochkin La-5
- Macchi C.202
- MÁVAG Héja
- Messerschmitt Bf 109
- Mikoyan-Gurevich MiG-3
- Mitsubishi A6M Zero
- Morane-Saulnier MS.406
- Nakajima Ki-43
- Polikarpov I-180
- PZL.50 Jastrząb
- Reggiane Re.2000 Falco I
- Reggiane Re.2001 Falco II
- Rogožarski IK-3
- Supermarine Spitfire
- Yakovlev Yak-1

Related lists

- List of aircraft of World War II
- List of aircraft of Hungary in World War II
- List of fighter aircraft
