= Manfréd Weiss Steel and Metal Works =

Former Hungarian heavy industry enterprise

Coordinates: 47°26′59″N 19°4′43″E

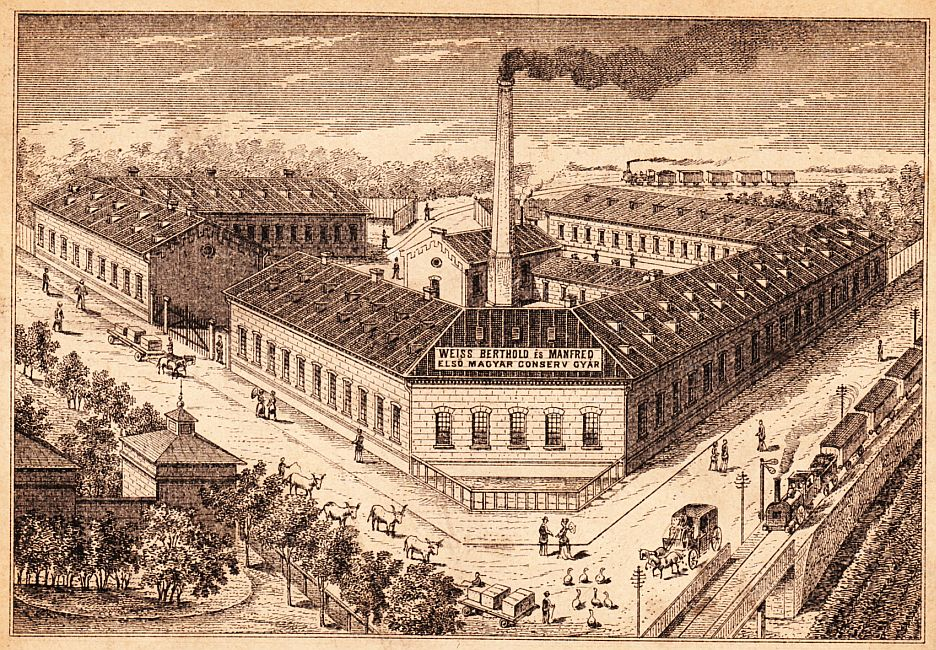
An 1880 view of the canned food factory at Csepel, which in time became the core of the Manfréd Weiss Steel and Metal Works (This factory was located on Máriássy Street in Budapest's 9th district and was demolished in the 1990s.)

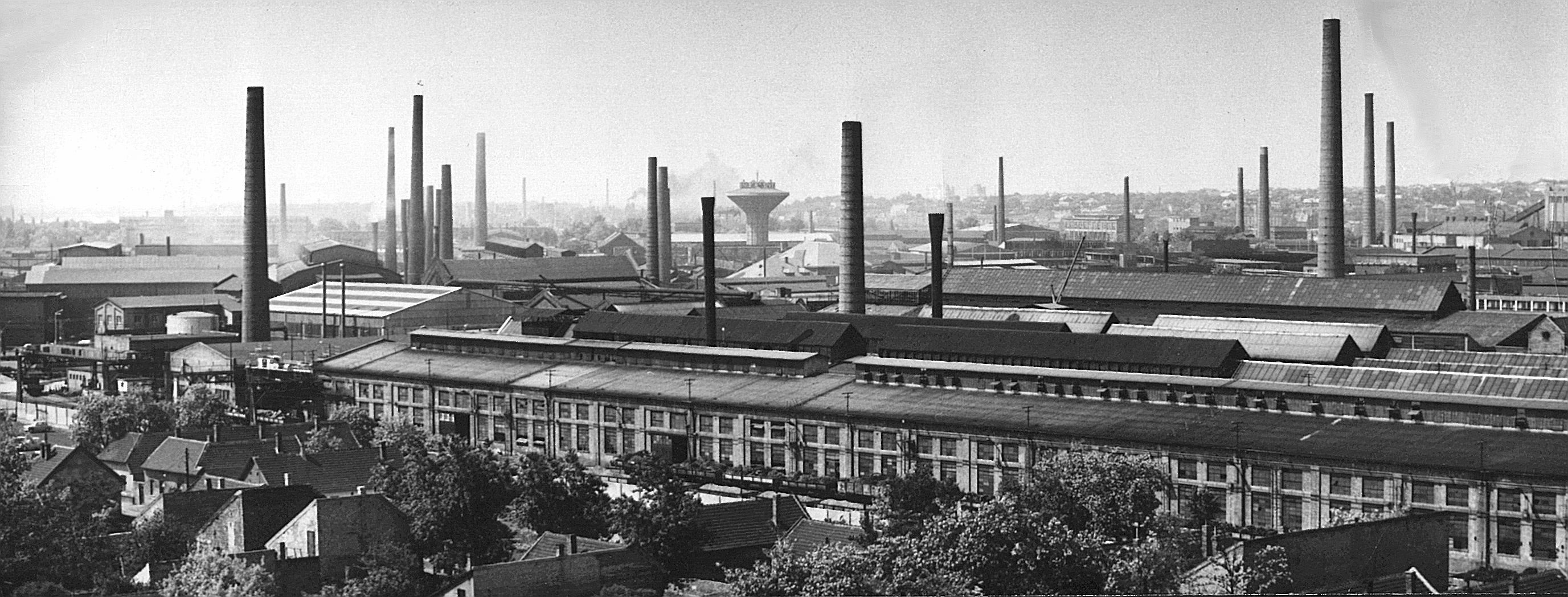
Photograph about the Weiss Manfréd Works in Csepel Island in 1901. The industrial complex comprised more than 32 factories.

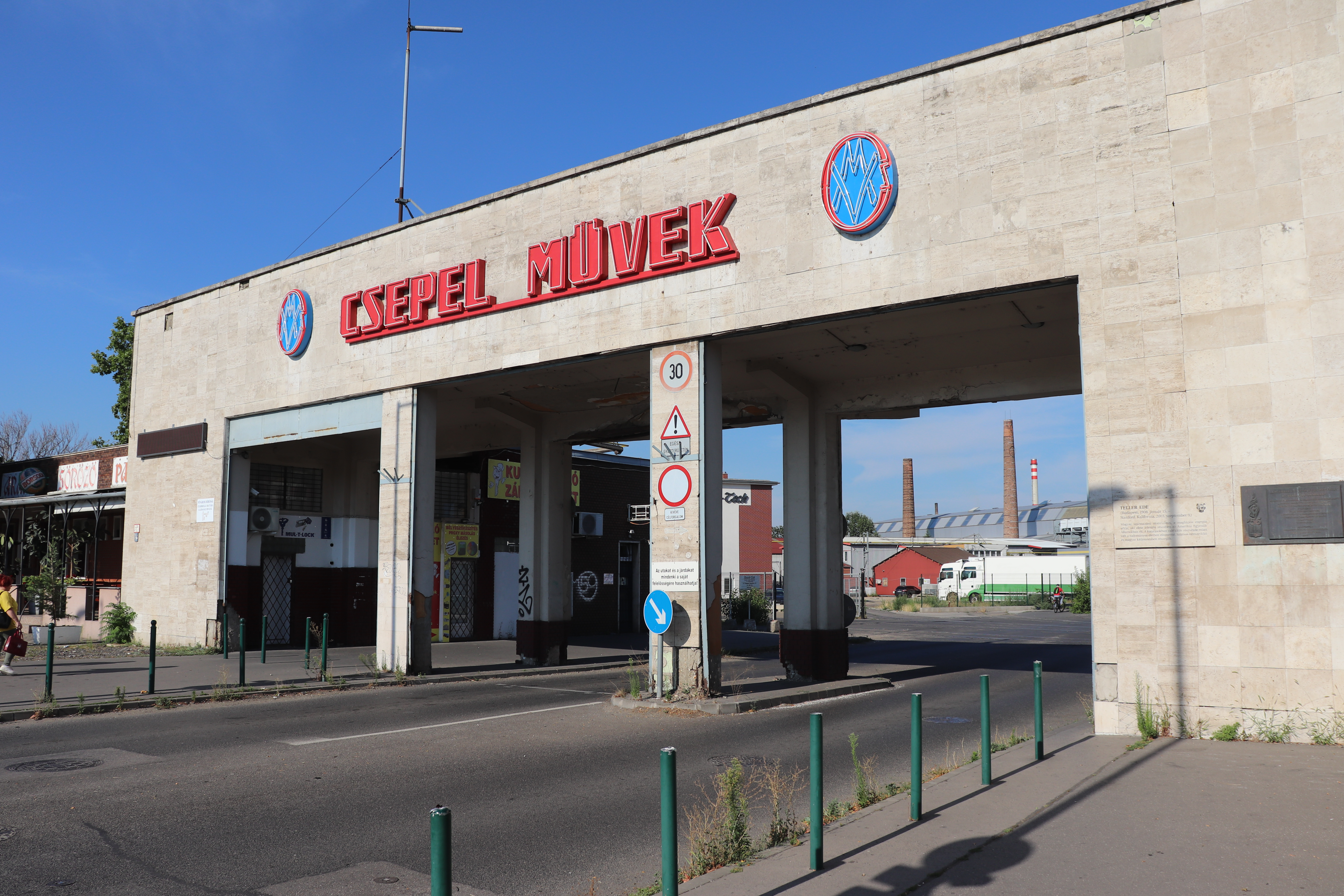
The main entrance

The Weiss Manfréd Acél- és Fémművek ("Manfréd Weiss Steel and Metal Works"), or colloquially Csepel Művek ("Csepel Works") was one of the largest machine factories in Hungary, located on Csepel island in the southern part of Budapest, founded in 1892. It was the second largest industrial enterprise in the Austro-Hungarian Monarchy, and the biggest industrial enterprise in the Hungarian half of the Empire. It played an integral role in the heavy industry and military production of the Austro-Hungarian Monarchy. Founded by Baron Manfréd Weiss of Csepel, an industrialist of Jewish origin, by the time of World War I the company was one of largest defense contractors in Austria-Hungary, producing all types of equipment, from airplanes and munitions to automotive engines, bicycles Csepel bicycle and cars. Badly damaged by Allied air raids and eventually pillaged during World War II, the company continued in existence until 1950, when it was nationalised and renamed to Rákosi Mátyás Vas- és Fémművek ("Mátyás Rákosi Iron and Metal Works NV", where "NV" means Nemzeti Vállalat, "National Company").

== History ==
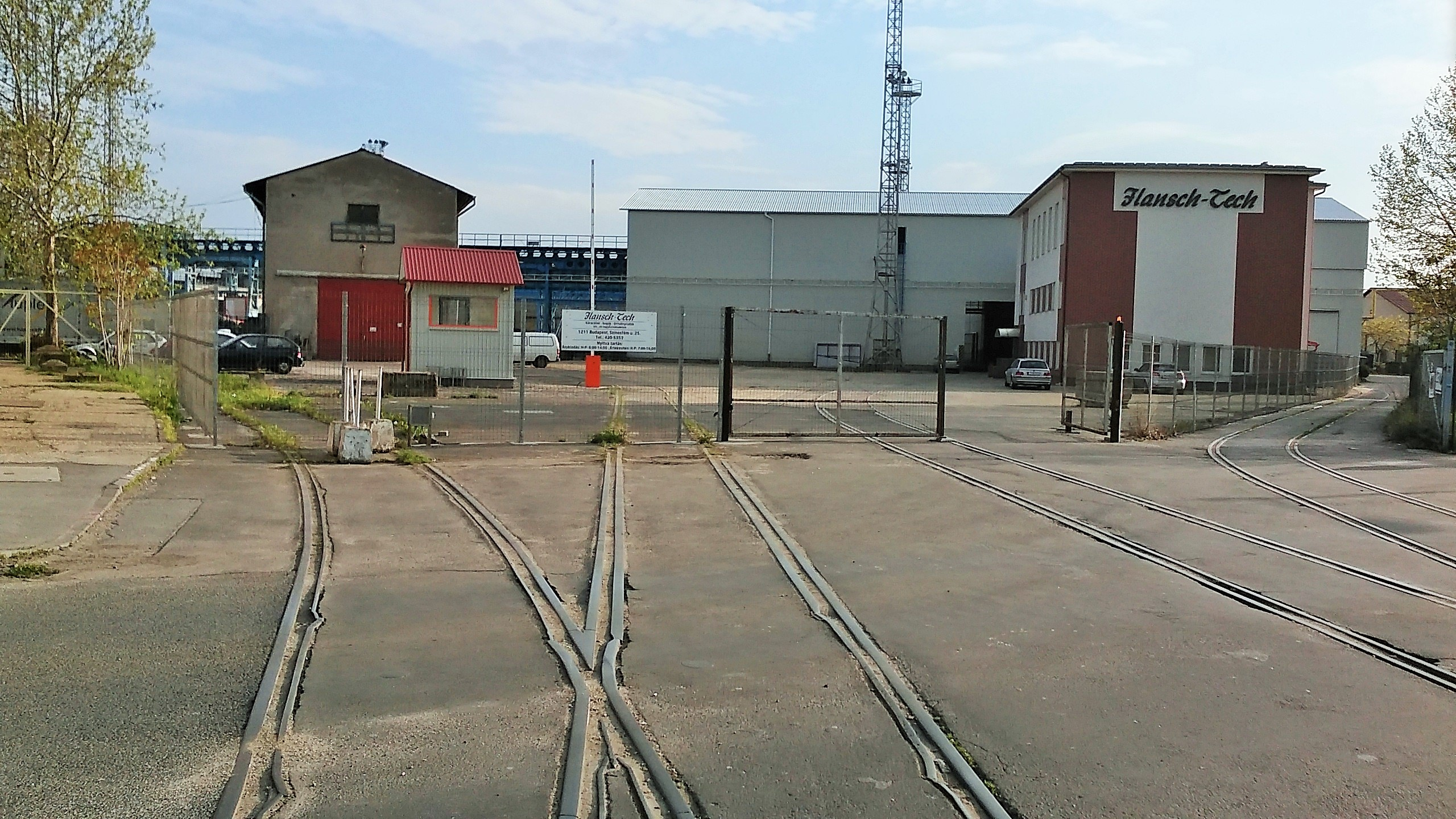
A major network of industrial sidings was built in the factory area, only a small part of which is used today.

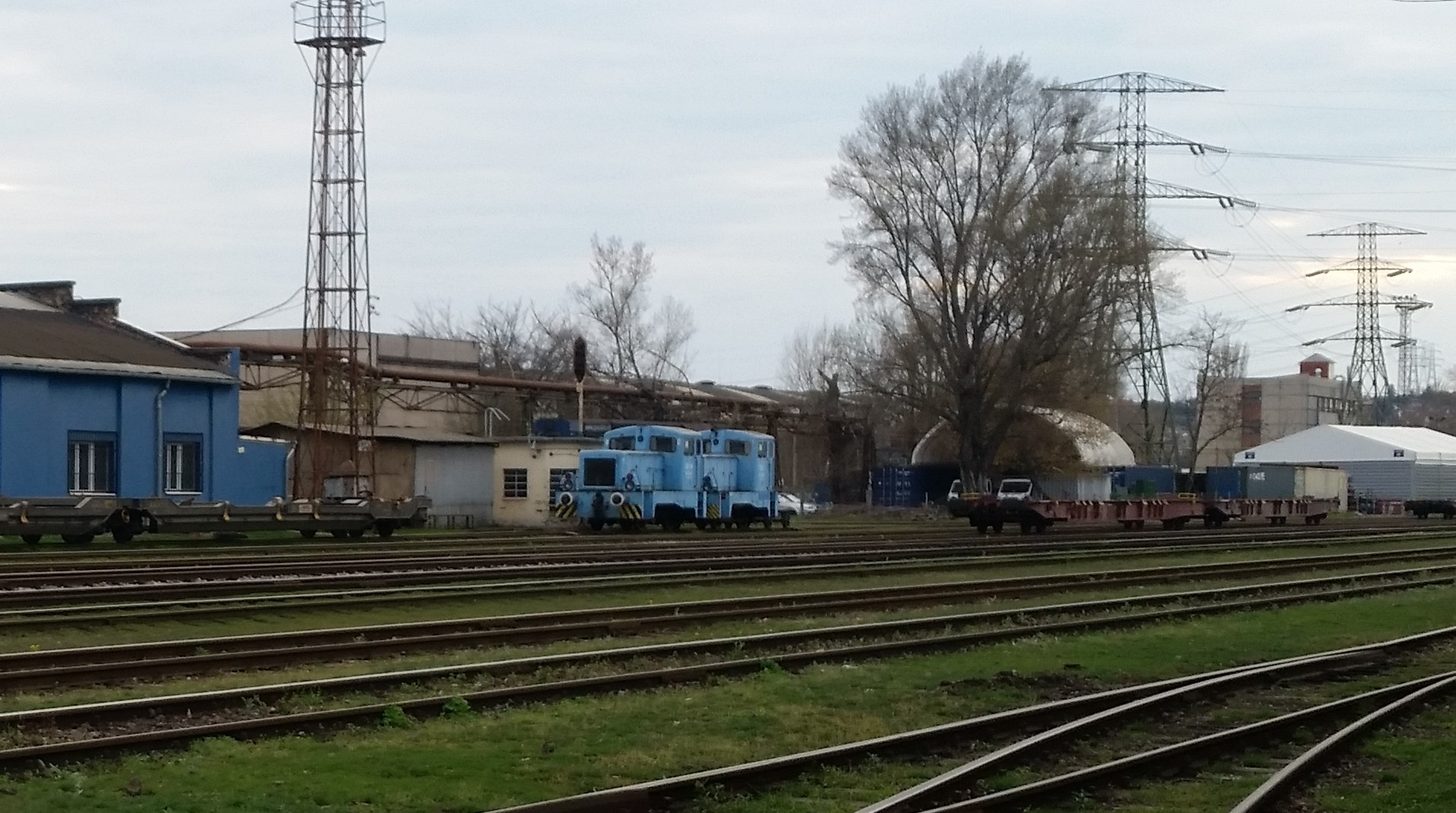
Internal freight traffic was previously carried out with GDR A26 (DR Class V 15) locomotives from the 1960s/1970s.

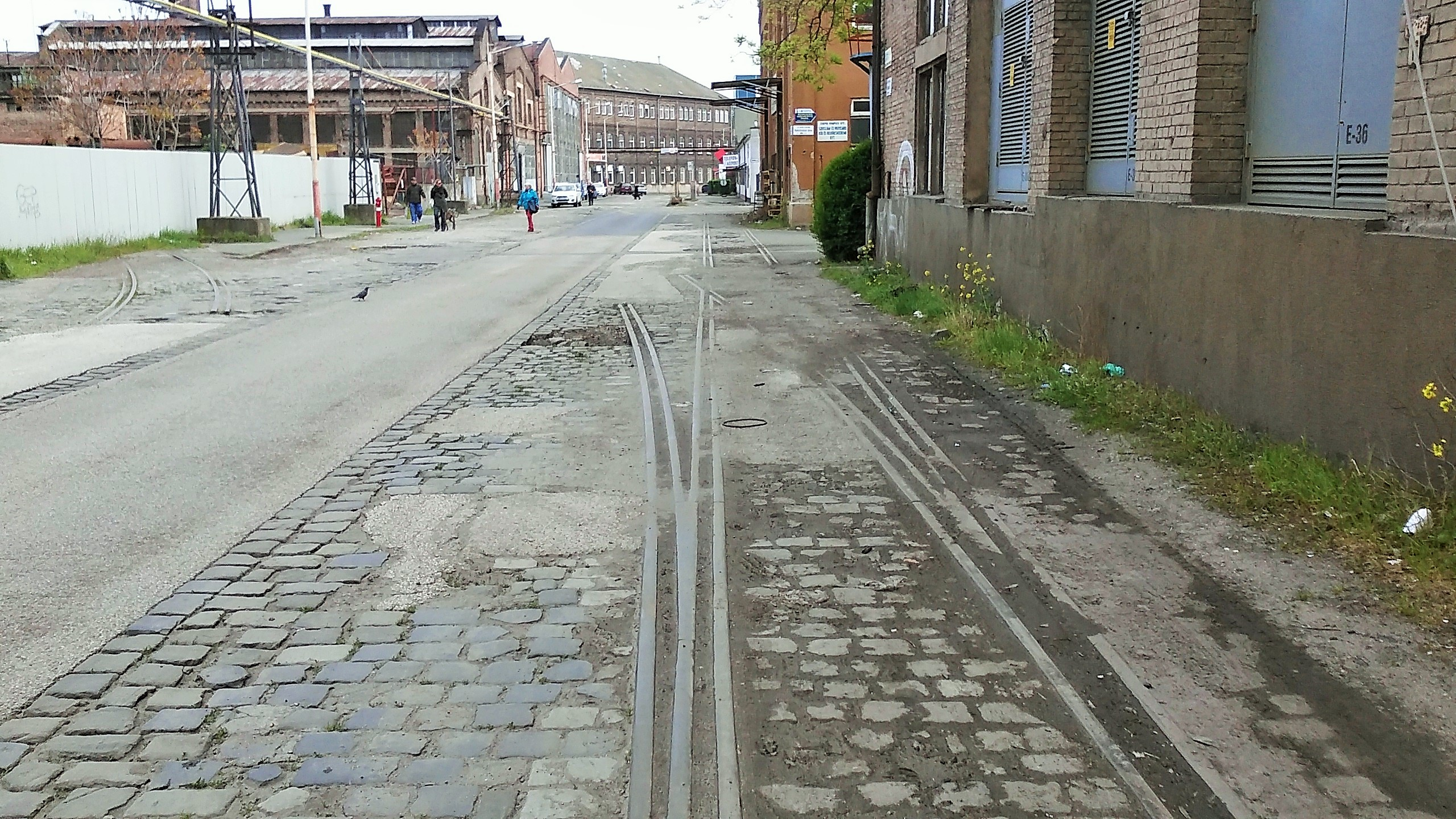
The remaining cobblestone pavements (often poured with concrete here and there / repaired) are characteristic.

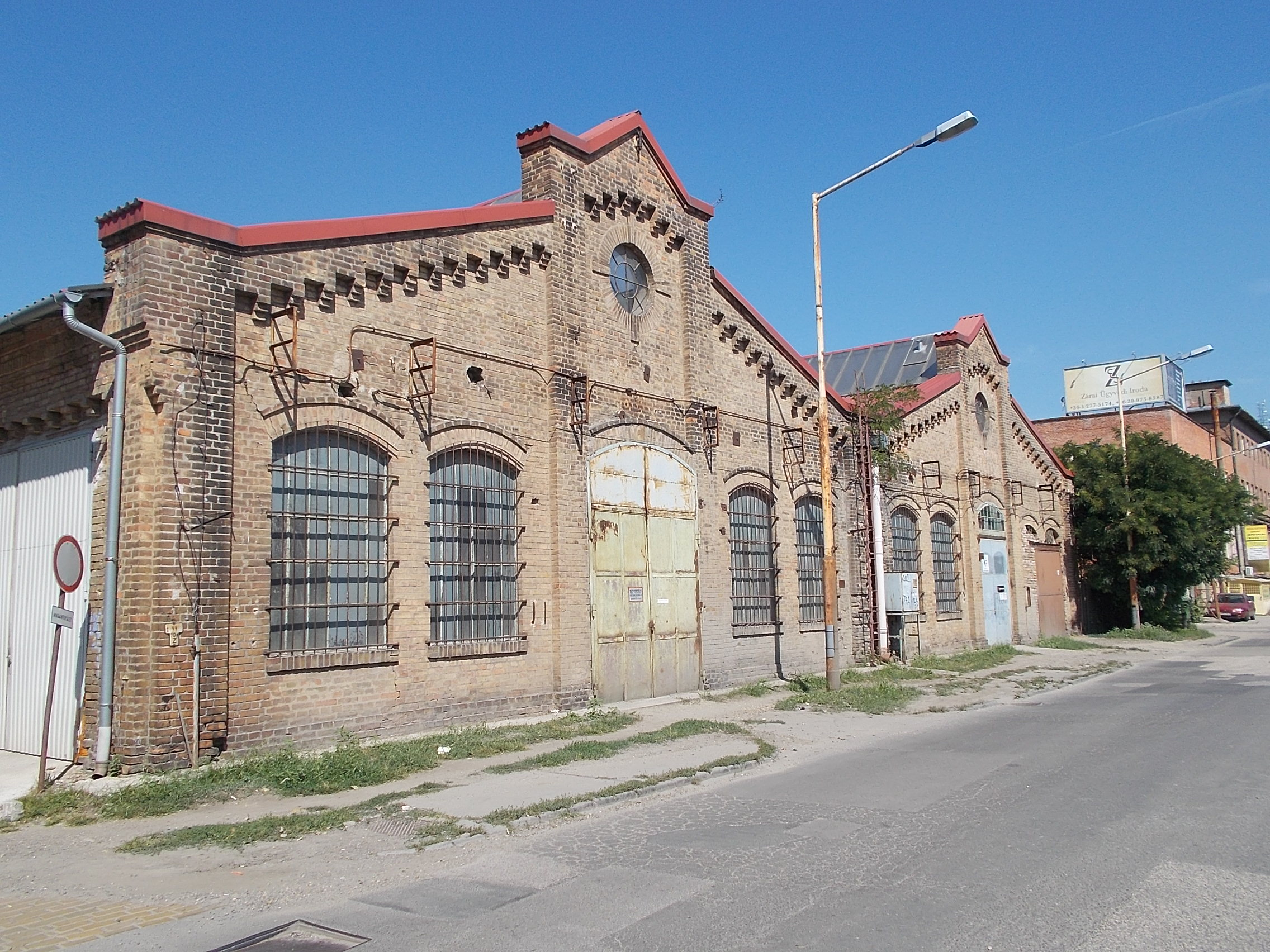
Although many newer buildings can be seen within the plant – there are still old 100-year-old industrial eclectic (raw brick-clad) halls to be found.

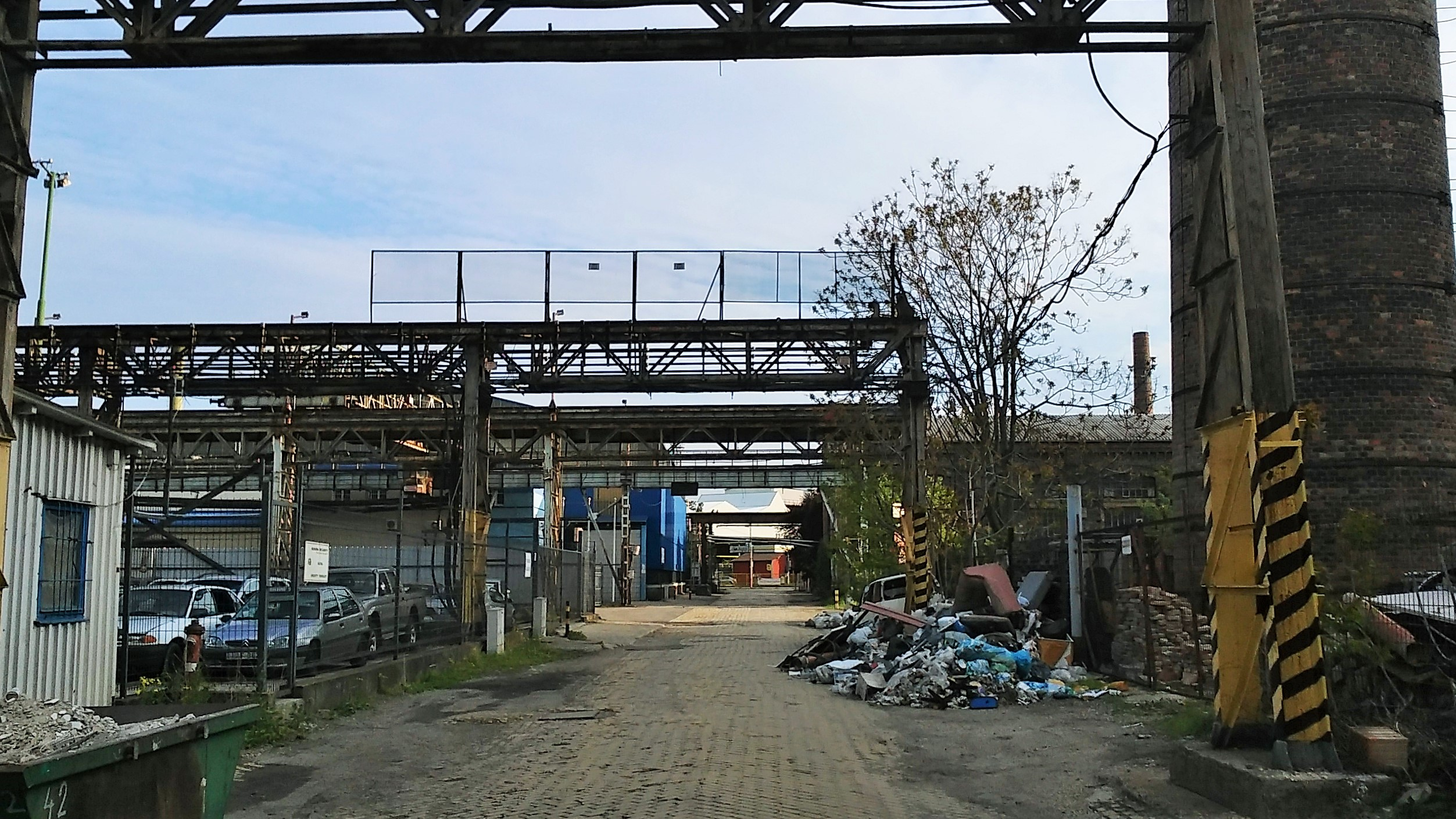
The characteristic image includes large, rusty iron structures – sometimes towering over the streets.

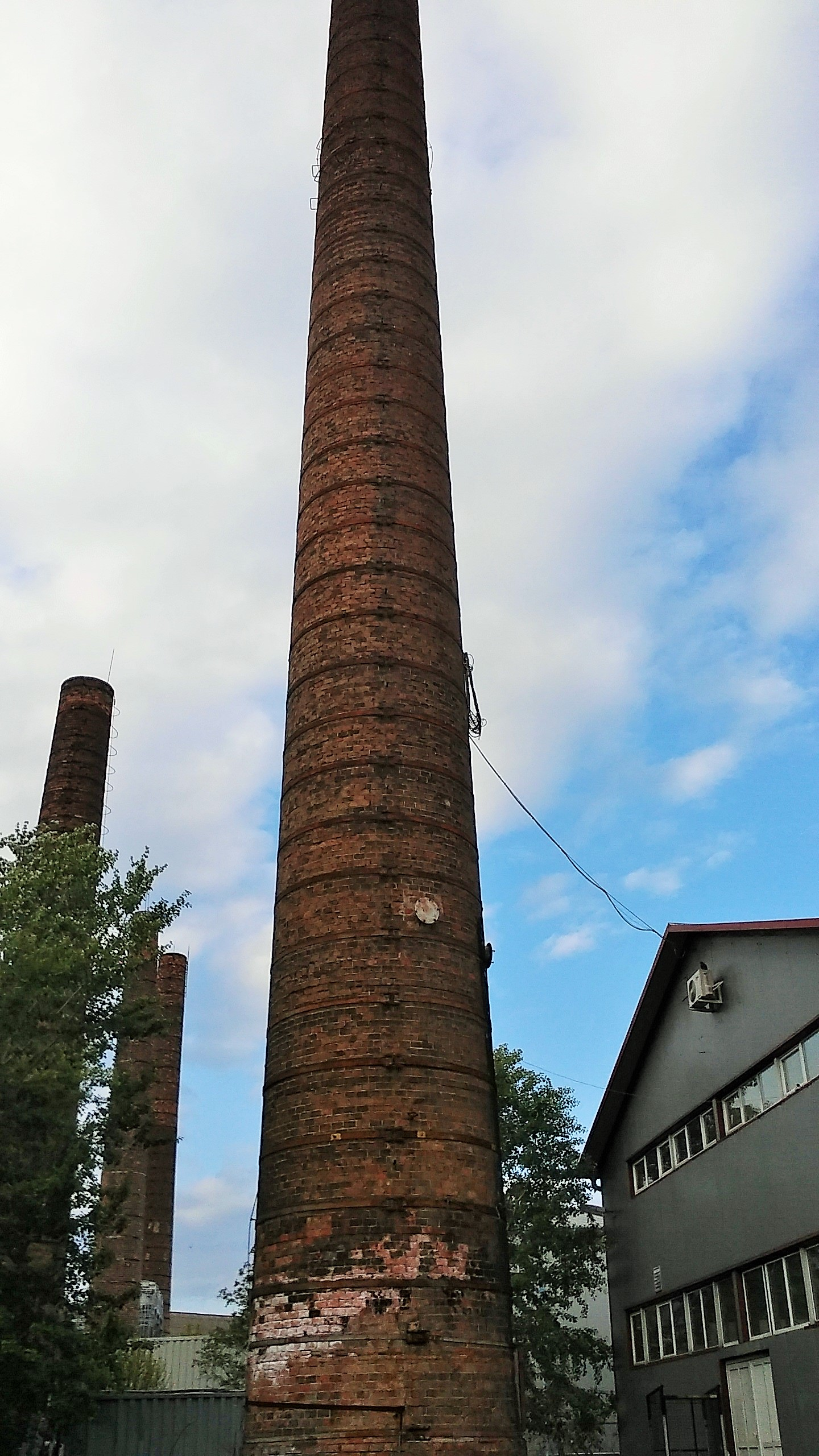
In a few places, tall brick chimneys still unused are a reminder of the old, smoke-laden industrial activity.

Its predecessor, the Weiss cannery, was originally established in Lövölde Square, District VI. of Budapest, by Manfréd Weiss and his brother Bertold in 1882, under the name of Weiss Berthold és Manfréd Első Magyar Conserv Gyár (Berthold and Manfred Weiss First Hungarian Cannery Factory). The brothers gradually expanded the canning factory, then moved it to Máriássy Street near the Közvágóhíd, where they produced meat products under the Globus brand, mainly for the army, and used the spare capacity during the seasonal lull to dismantle and reload infantry ammunition. Later, in response to the growing demand for canned goods, the production of tin cans for packaging was added to the programme, which led to a shift to the iron industry. (Manfréd Weiss First Hungarian Cannery and Metalware Factory). From 1886 the factory also produced cartridge cases and later ammunition for the Austro-Hungarian Army and Navy. The new factory produced all types, from small arms to artillery shells.

In 1892 production begins at the infantry ammunition factory built within the Weiss Manfréd factory in Csepel, where 8 mm Mannlicher rifle cartridges are initially produced for the Hungarian Royal Defence Forces and the Austro-Hungarian Joint Army. From 1893, millions of 7.62×54 mmR-calibre Mosin-Nagant rifle cartridges were produced for the Russian Tsarist army between 1893-94. Then the production of artillery shells of various sizes begins.

Thus, Manfréd Weiss became one of the principal defence contractors for the Hungarian part of the empire, his main competitor being the state-owned steel mill in Diósgyőr, the Diósgyőr-Vasgyár. In 1906, the company was supported by Hungarian Society of Industrialists, who lobbied for a new law that would allow state-owned companies to produce only products unobtainable from private companies. With such support, the Manfréd Weiss Works soon emerged as the largest firm on the market.

Another boost in company's history came in 1911, when Austria-Hungary significantly expanded its military budget. The public orders allowed the company to quickly expand ammunition production and establish additional factories: new steel and iron furnaces, and new copper, nickel, and aluminium installations. Production capacity was growing and soon the firm became one of the principal sources of ammunition for the armies of the Kingdom of Serbia, Kingdom of Bulgaria, Portugal, Spain, Mexico, and the Russian Empire. By 1913, the Manfréd Weiss Works employed over 5000 workers.

During World War I, the workforce exceeded 30,000. For his services to the Austro-Hungarian state, Weiss was ennobled, becoming Manfréd, Baron Weiss de Csepel, after the main seat of operations of his company. In the beginning of the WW1, the WM complex had 250 hectare territory with 216 factory buildings.

In 1914, the outbreak of the World War brought the greatest opportunities for Weiss Manfréd. By that time, the company, which employed nearly 30,000 workers, had outgrown the framework of a small business and transformed into a family joint-stock company. The army not only brought in orders but also demanded an increase in production, leading to the introduction of a three-shift work schedule, making it the first in the country.

In 1917, 330 million pieces of infantry and artillery ammunition were produced, and that year, the General Insurance estimated the factory's value at nearly 100 million Crown. (For context: at that time, a kilogram of bread cost 56 fillér, a worker earned 100-130 Crown, an older teacher earned 200 Crown, while corporate presidents and parliamentary representatives earned around 1000-2000 Crown monthly. The greatest luxury item of the era was the automobile: a two-seater, 8-horsepower Opel 'Doktorwagen' cost 4500 Crown, while a four-seater, 20-horsepower Benz10 cost 14,000 Crown.)

By the outbreak of World War II, the company had become a modern industrial conglomerate, with over 40,000 employees; its management remained largely composed of Hungarian Jews. When Nazi Germany overran Hungary in 1944, the majority were arrested by the Gestapo. The Weiss family was allowed to emigrate to Portugal and escape the horrors of the Holocaust, but their large art collection, along with the entire industrial complex bearing their name, was taken over by Germany. However, as Germany insisted Hungary was still a sovereign nation, the owners of the company received large compensation and remained official owners, with the German-imposed management merely a trusteeship for a period of 25 years. Eventually, control over the company was given to the Nazi SS, with a completely new holding company's management, with officers including Erhard Milch, Kurt Baron von Schröder, and Hans Jüttner.

From March 1944, the Weiss Manfréd factories were hit by numerous Allied bombing raids. The Danube Aircraft Factory was rendered inoperable by four such attacks. Seven raids on the Csepel factory resulted in severe damage to most of the metal works, the copper electrolysis plant was burnt down, while the aircraft, tractor and enamel factories were also destroyed.

The repair of the damage suffered during the Second World War and the resumption of production required a major effort. The factory not only had to meet domestic needs, but also produced machinery for war reparations and supplied the occupying Soviet Army with vehicle parts. In 1947, 90 percent of the factory's output was war reparations. The factory was placed under state control in 1946, at which time the Weiss-Chorin family's ownership was not yet extinguished, but in 1948 it was effectively nationalized.

Between 1948 and 1950, Ferenc Bíró (1904-2006), a younger brother of Mátyás Rákosi, was appointed general manager of the factory. During the years of forced industrialisation, the factory's production of machine tools increased, but when industrial policy changed in 1954, production declined. In the following decades, it grew again and diversified because of Comecon cooperation and significant exports to the West. By the 1970s, almost half of production was Western exports.

== Weiss Manfréd aircraft ==
- Weiss Manfréd WM-10 Ölyv
- Weiss Manfréd WM-16 Budapest
- Weiss Manfréd WM-21 Sólyom
- Weiss Manfréd WM-23 Ezüst Nyíl

== Another literature ==
- Varga László: A csepeli gyáróriás kialakulásának története, Budapesti Műszaki Egyetem Mérnöki Továbbképző Intézet, Budapest, 1981, ISBN 963-431-307-8 (kézirat gyanánt)
- Kis Pál István: Rekviem. Szembesítő képek és emlékképzetek a Csepel Vas- és Fémművekről; fotó Tamási Gábor; Vitolla Marketing és Tanácsadó Bt., Szekszárd, 2012
- Varga László: A csepeli csoda. Weiss Manfréd és vállalata a Monarchiában, 1-2.; BFL, Bp., 2016 (Várostörténeti tanulmányok)
- 90 éves a Csepel Vas- és Fémművek 1892–1982 – Gazdaságtörténeti monográfia, Csepel Vas- és Fémművek, Budapest, 1982
- Rabi Béla – Dr. Adamovits Jenő – Dr. Dobay Jenő: Csepel Vas- és Fémművek 75. éve, Budapest, é. n.
- (szerk.) Baczoni Gábor: Iratok a Csepel Vas- és Fémművek történetéhez 1892–1977, Csepel Vas- és Fémművek Oktatási és Társadalomtudományi Intézet Társadalomtudományi Osztály, Budapest, 1977, ISBN 963-320-660-X
- Csepel története, Csepel Vas- és Fémművek Pártbizottsága, Budapest, 1965
- Mikus Károlyné: Képek a Csepel Vas-és Fémművek múltjából és jelenéből, Budapest, 2002 (Öntödei múzeumi füzetek 10.)
- Adamovics Jenő: Csepel Vas- és Fémművek 40 éve 1945–1985 / Gazdaságtörténeti monográfia, Udvarhelyi és Udvarhelyi Bt., Budapest, 2005, ISBN 963-460-885-X
