= Weiss WM-10 Ölyv =

Hungarian biplane trainer

WM-10 Ölyv

General information
- Type: Biplane trainer
- National origin: Hungary
- Manufacturer: Manfred Weiss
- Number built: 14

History
- Introduction date: 1933
- First flight: 1931

The Weiss WM-10 Ölyv (English: "Buzzard") was a 1930s Hungarian biplane trainer designed and built by the Manfred Weiss company.

== Development ==
First flown in September 1931 the WM-10 was a single-bay two-seat primary training biplane powered by the companies own 75 kW (100 hp) MW Sport I engine. The prototype was later modified to take the more powerful 89 kW (120 hp) MW Sport II engine and an improved landing gear and eight were built as the WM-10a and delivered in 1933. The last aircraft was re-engined with a 97 kW (130 hp) MW Sport III engine and larger fuel tanks and re-designated the WM-13 .

Five more aircraft were built with Siemens-Halske Sh 12 engines as aerobatic trainers for use by combat units as the EM-10. In 1938 all surviving aircraft we re-engined with the Siemens engine and all were known as the WM-10. Three aircraft survived with the military to 1941 when they were retired to be used as glider tugs.

== Variants ==
WM-10
Prototype with a 75 kW (100 hp) MW Sport I engine, one built.
WM-10a
Production aircraft with a 89 kW (120 hp) MW Sport II engine, eight built. One converted to WM-13 and survivors later re-engined with a Siemens-Halske Sh 12 engines.
WM-13
One WM-10a re-engined with a 97 kW (130 hp) MW Sport III engine.
EM-10
Powered by an 82 kW (110 hp) Siemens-Halske Sh 12 engined aerobatic trainer, five built.

== Operators ==
Hungary

- Hungarian Air Force

== Specifications (WM-10a) ==
General characteristics

- Crew: 2
- Wingspan: 9.50 m (31 ft 2 in)
- Powerplant: 1 × MW Sport II , 89 kW (120 hp)

== See also ==
Related lists

- List of Interwar military aircraft
