= Straussler V-4 =

Hungarian interwar light tank

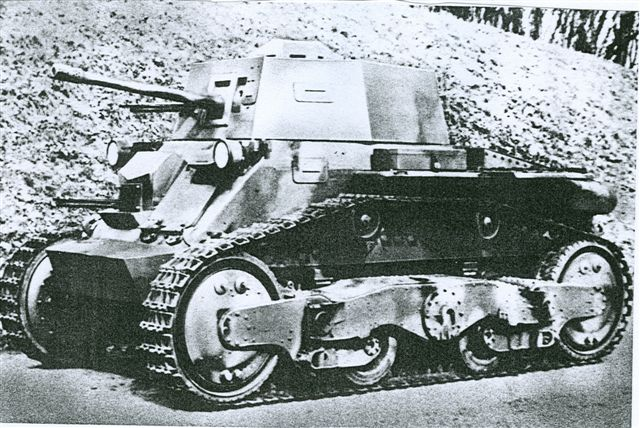
- Straussler V-4 tank in 1938 (V-4/40 version)
- Type: Light tank
- Place of origin: Kingdom of Hungary

Service history
- In service: 1937-1938; 1938-1944 (in non-combat role)
- Used by: Kingdom of Hungary

Production history
- Designer: Nicholas Straussler
- Designed: 1932-1937
- Manufacturer: Manfréd Weiss Works
- Produced: 1933-38
- No. built: 4+
- Variants: V-3, V-4, V-4/40, Straussler Light, Type D, Type R, PV-T

Specifications
- Mass: 6–12 t (5.9–11.8 long tons); ~10 t (9.8 long tons) (V-4); ~12 t (12 long tons) (V-4/40)
- Length: 3.64 m (11 ft 11 in)
- Width: 2.31 m (7 ft 7 in)
- Height: 2.01 m (6 ft 7 in)
- Crew: 3 (V-3); 3 (V-4); 4 (V-4/40)
- Armor: 9-23 mm
- Main armament: 37 mm gun (Note: 37 mm 1915M or 37 mm 36M L/45 or L/46.5) or 40 mm 37M
- Secondary armament: 1 × 8 mm Gebauer 34/37M twin machine gun (V-4); 2 × 8 mm Gebauer 34/37M twin machine gun (V-4/40)
- Engine: AC II (V-3); Manfréd Weiss V-OHC (V-4); Manfréd Weiss 8-cylinder (V-4/40); 100-180 hp
- Suspension: leaf spring
- Maximum speed: 60-45 km/h (on wheels); 40-32 km/h (on tracks); 8 km/h (on water)

The Straussler V-4, also known as Light Tank V4, was a Hungarian amphibious light tank design of the interwar period and it was designed by Nicholas Straussler. It was developed from the V-3, one of Nicholas Straussler's earlier models.

== Development ==
=== V-3 ===
In late 1932, Straussler signed an agreement with the Manfréd Weiss corporation to build a light tank prototype based on the agricultural and mountain tractor he developed earlier (V-1 and V-2). Aware of the agreement between the Manfréd Weiss and Straussler, the Hungarian Ministry of Defense purchased the rights in 1933 to manufacture Straussler's tank, and ordered a second prototype from Manfréd Weiss for further development.

It was expected that the V-3 would be a good starting point for a medium-sized tank developed for the Royal Hungarian Army, 12 of which the armored units could be equipped in a short time, as it was infeasible to buy a modern, foreign development at that time. The wooden prototype was completed by June 1934, and the two vehicles were completed by the end of 1935.

The first trials of the V-3 took place in January 1936. After successful suspension tests, the ministry ordered ten test vehicles from the Manfréd Weiss Works and also envisaged a subsequent order of 100. The vehicle would have had a crew of three and was fitted with a four-cylinder engine designed by Manfréd Weiss Works, which would have given the vehicle a top speed of 60 km/h on road wheels, 40 km/h on tracks, and 8 km/h in water.

=== V-4 ===
In the autumn of 1936, the designers at Manfréd Weiss were ordered to develop and build a much-improved version, the V-4. As armament, a domestically designed 40 mm cannon and an 8 mm Gebauer twin machine gun was installed. The hull and a new hexagonal turret was revised, which made the vehicle weigh nearly 10 tons, so the underpowered four-cylinder engine was replaced by a new eight-cylinder Manfréd Weiss engine.

The general staff was satisfied with the results of the tests of the V-4 in 1937, though the high silhouette, making the vehicle unstable, and the poorly angled armor layout was criticised. In addition, it was proposed to place another machine gun in the turret and an extra crew member, which involved the enlargement of the turret.

In the spring of 1938, the Manfréd Weiss factory in Csepel finished the second prototype of the V-4. The front of the hull was heavily modified, and the turret was enlarged as much as possible with a cupola with observation prisms on top.

== Production ==
In August 1937, the V-4 was tested against the Swedish Landsverk L-60 and a German Panzer I. After the trials, the experts classified the Panzer I as obsolete, but decided to send both the V-4 and L-60 into service, with the latter being developed into the Hungarian Toldi light tanks, which made up the majority of the Hungarian armored forces early in World War II, while the heavier and better-armed V-4 would have been there to support the heavy units.

Another trial was held for the V-4 in June 1938, during which it was again compared to the L-60, but it ended in rejection of the now 12-ton tank, with the main reason being the unreliability and poor mobility.

The real reason for the tank being considered quite good in 1936 and suddenly unacceptable in 1938, was the changing political situation. Hungary's closest allies, Italy and Germany, both started rearmament programmes earlier, which resulted in the Hungarian rearmament programme of Győr. This meant that there was no longer any obstacle to being able to buy foreign weapons, so the military leadership no longer had to be satisfied with the performance of the otherwise still somewhat decent V-4, leading to the cancellation of its development and production.

== Service history ==
- Kingdom of Hungary: The V-4 didn't see combat during its time in the Royal Hungarian Army. The armament of the second V-4 prototype were later removed and, until 1944, it was used as a towing tractor at the Háros Island test site. In 1945, after the Soviet occupation of Budapest, the Red Army transported it to the Soviet Union, where it was destroyed.
- United Kingdom: Straussler frequently transported his developments, including the V-3 and V-4 to his company in the UK. In Britain, it underwent several modifications, which resulted in the likes of the similar Straussler Light Tank, Type D, or Type R, which all participated in army trials, but were never adopted.
- Kingdom of Italy: In September 1937, Italy requested the Manfréd Weiss Works to send the first version of the V-4 to take part in army trials. Italian experts however found it unsuitable for use in mountain terrain, so they decided to not purchase a license for production. The further fate of the first V-4 prototype isn't clear, though it was likely returned to Hungary in 1942.
- Soviet Union: The Straussler Light Tank, Type D, Type R, and a fourth design referred to as PV-T were all transported from Britain to be tested by the USSR, but were eventually rejected as the main reason of the Soviet Union's interest was to inspect and study western technology.
- Poland: In 1937, Straussler designed a prototype similar to the Type R for an order from the Polish Army, equipped with two 90 hp engines, but it seemed unreliable and was sent back to Alvis-Straussler.
- Netherlands: In January 1938, another two prototypes, similar to the one designed for Poland were built for an order from the Netherlands, but difficulties arose with the suspension during the trials, and they were sent back to Straussler's workshop in the UK where they were scrapped.
- Empire of Japan: In the summer of 1938, a variant similar to the prototype sent to the USSR was transported to Japan for testing, its further fate is unknown though.

== See also ==
Other vehicles designed by Nicholas Straussler

- 39M Csaba armoured car
- Straussler MBT (proposal)
- DD Tanks

Other Hungarian tanks of the same era

- Toldi light tanks
- Turán I and II medium tanks
- Turán III medium tank
- 44M Tas heavy tank

Tanks of comparable role, performance, and era

- 7TP
- M2 light tank
- Panzer 35(t)
- Panzer 38(t)
- Renault R35
- T-26
- Tetrarch
- Type 95 Ha-Go
- Vickers 6-ton
