= Nicholas Straussler =

Hungarian engineer

Nicholas Peter Sorrel Straussler
- Straussler Miklós
- Straussler during the 1950s
- Born: 7 May 1891; Isaszeg, Kingdom of Hungary
- Died: 3 June 1966 (aged 75); London, United Kingdom
- Engineering career
- Discipline: Automotive engineering
- Projects: Armoured cars, DD tank
- Significant advance: Flotation devices

Nicholas Peter Sorrel Straussler (in Hungarian: Straussler Miklós Péter) (7 May 1891 – 3 June 1966) was an engineer mainly remembered for devising the flotation system used by Allied amphibious DD tanks during World War II. He also designed several armoured cars and tanks, including the 39M Csaba armoured car and the Straussler V-4 amphibious light tank. Born in Hungary, he developed a reputation as an innovative automotive engineer before becoming a British citizen during the interwar period. His work was mainly to do with amphibious, off-road and military vehicles.

== Biography ==
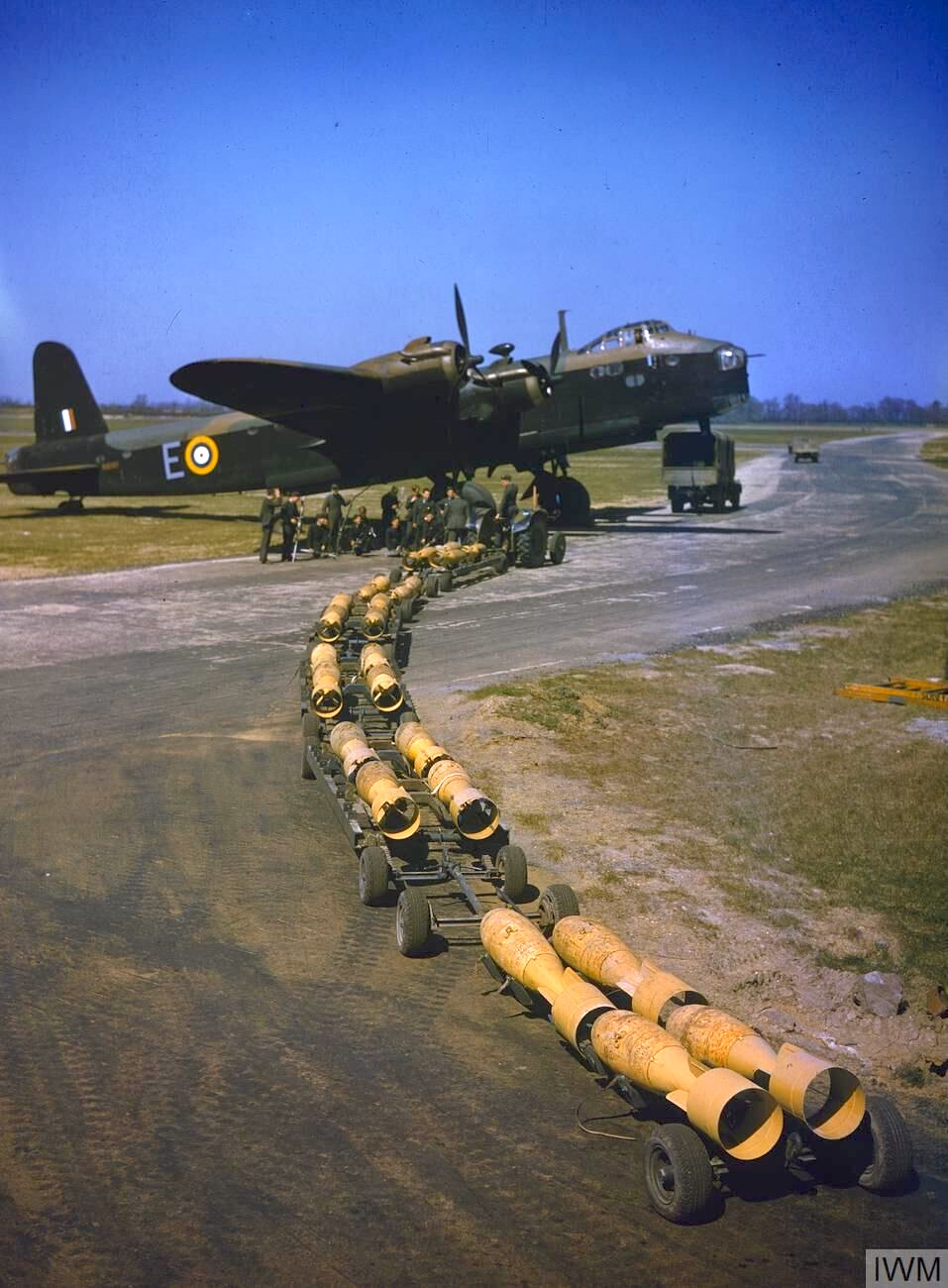
Short Stirling bomber being loaded with 250 lb bombs, carried on Alvis Straussler bomb trolleys.

Between 1928 and 1933, Straussler ran Folding Boats and Structures Ltd and patented a number of flotation devices, including collapsible ones. In February 1933, he became a British citizen.

Throughout the 1930s, he worked with Alvis Cars, Vickers-Armstrong and Hungarian companies on a variety of projects. His first armoured car, the AC1, was only partially built by H Manfred Weiss RT of Budapest in 1933. His work for Alvis involved designing armoured cars such as the Alvis Straussler AC2 and the Alvis Straussler AC3. The prototypes were built by his own company Straussler Mechanisation Ltd, and the production vehicles by a new joint company, Alvis-Straussler. that was formed in July, 1936.

An AC2 was shown to the British Air Ministry in 1935 and it was tested in the Middle East. In 1937 Straussler linked with Alvis to form the Alvis-Straussler company. His LAC armoured car (and a field artillery tractor version of it) was shown to the British Army and tested in 1938. The LAC had two engines - one driving the nearside wheels and the other the offside ones. However the cooling system was inadequate for hot countries and the War Office rejected it. Straussler also designed a vehicle with an articulated chassis which was supplied to the RAF for use as tractors. In 1938 Alvis-Straussler was supplanted by Alvis Mechanisation Ltd and Straussler ended his connection with Alvis.

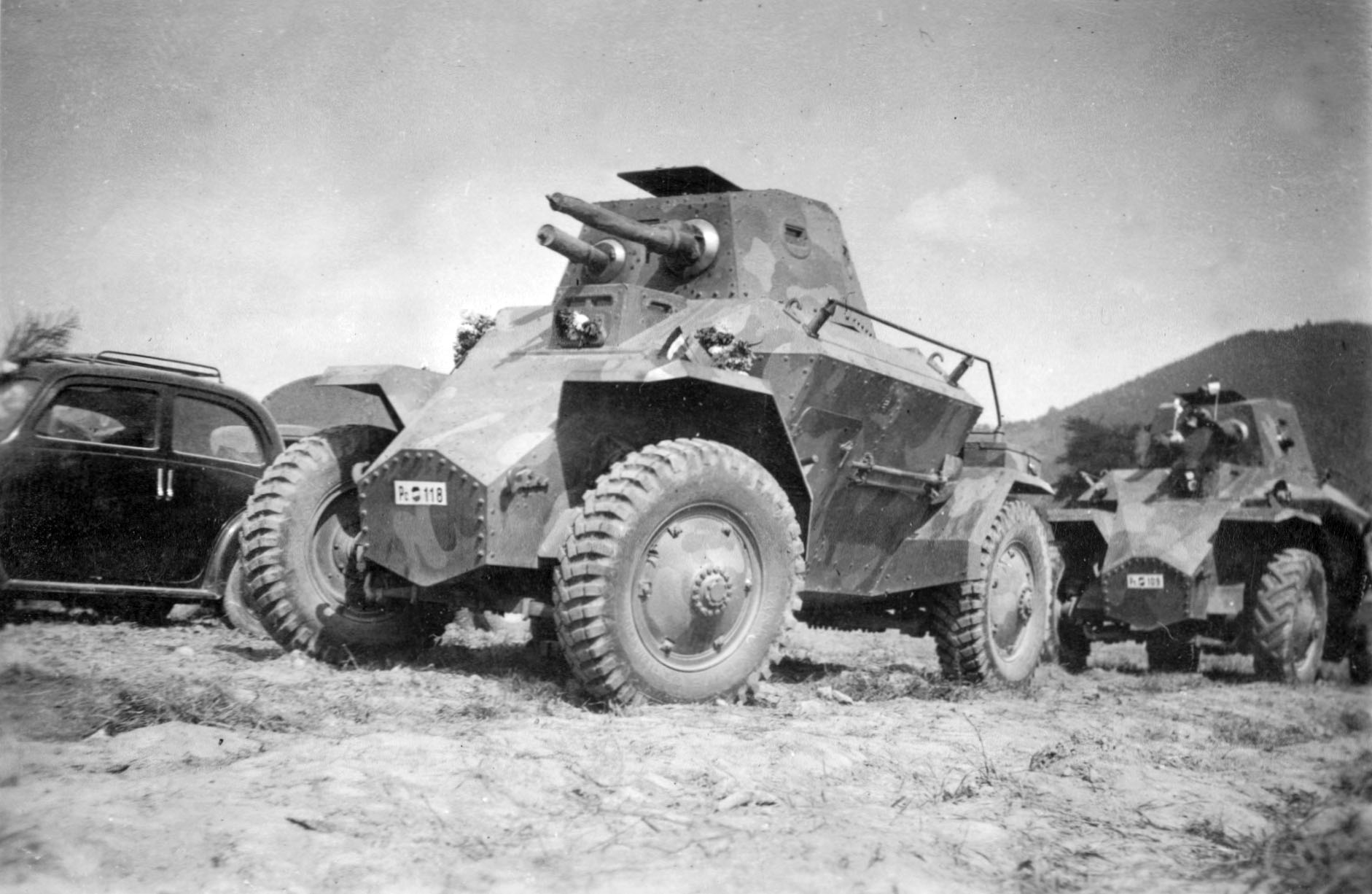
A Hungarian 39M Csaba armoured car – this vehicle was designed by Nicholas Straussler

He later improved the AC2 design and it was built in Hungary by Manfred Weiss as the 39M Csaba. These saw service with the Royal Hungarian Army fighting against the USSR on the Eastern Front during the Second World War. As Hungary was allied to the Axis powers during much of the war, 39M Csabas were also used by the German Army. Another vehicle he was involved with that saw Axis use was the Garner-Straussler G.3, a four-wheel drive, off-road truck that was used in small numbers as an artillery tractor by the Germans. This truck had the unusual feature of being driven by two engines that were coupled together.

An amphibious tank, the Straussler V-4 (also known as Light Tank V-4), was built in Hungary to his design in the 1930s, but it never got past the prototype stage as the Hungarian Army chose instead to use the Toldi tank. One of his designs that did see widespread use was the Alvis Straussler Bomb Trolley. Around 10,000 were made for the Royal Air Force to transport bombs, mainly within airfields. Each carried four 250 pound bombs, although large versions were later produced.

== Military flotation devices ==
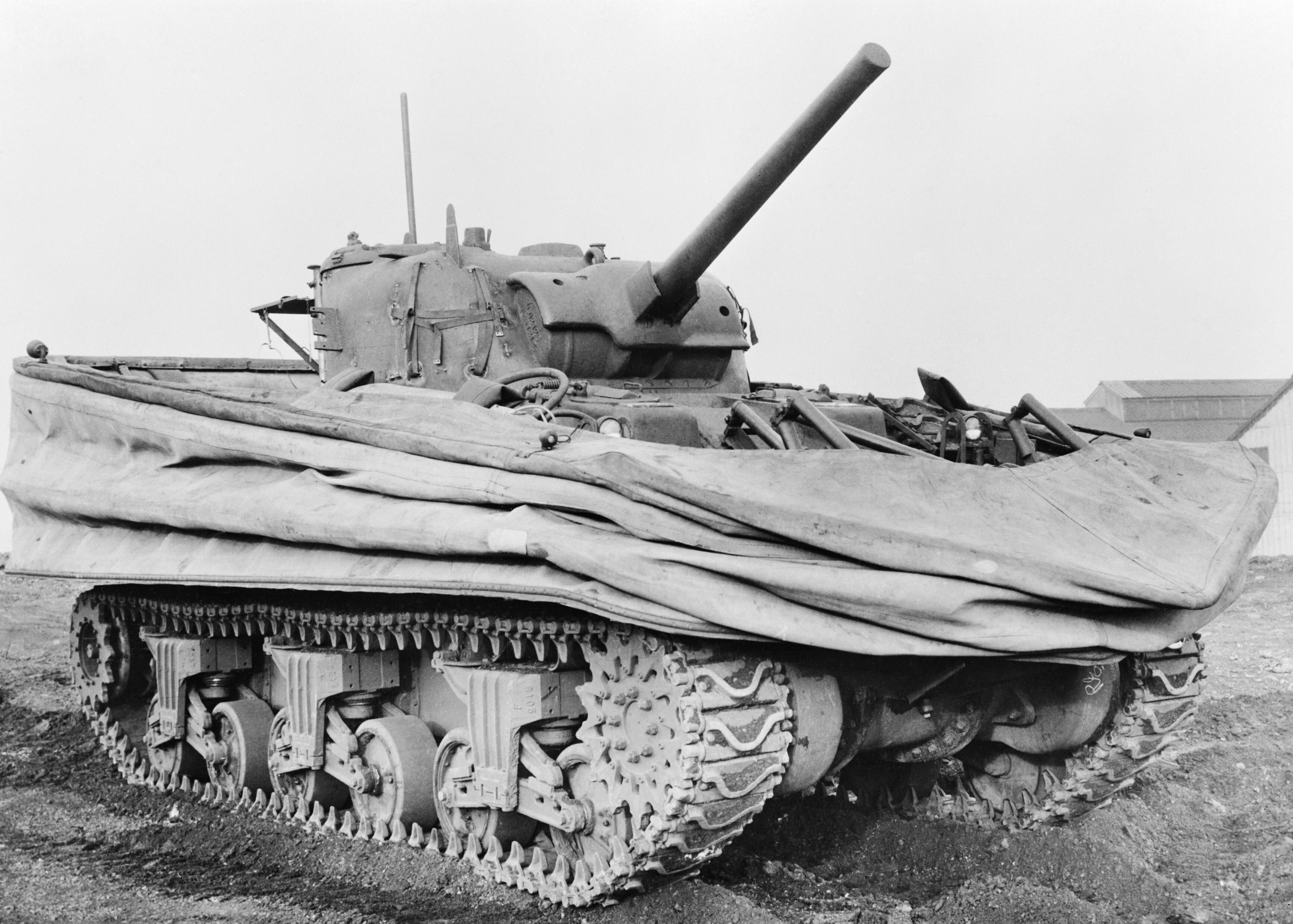
Sherman DD tank, with the flotation screen lowered

Straussler's work for Vickers-Armstrong, included designing accessories for tanks. The engineering solutions he produced tended to be innovative, though sometimes at the expense of practicability. He used his flotation device experience to develop collapsible floats for Vickers-Armstrong that could be used to construct a pontoon bridge or could be mounted on either side of a light tank to make it amphibious. Trials conducted by the British War Office showed that such a tank, propelled by an outboard motor, 'swam' reasonably well.

The system was unsatisfactory, mainly because of the unwieldy bulk of floats that were big enough to float a tank (each was roughly the size of the tank itself). In practice, there would be severe difficulties in transporting by truck enough floats, even collapsed ones, to move a large unit of tanks across a body of water. Also, such floats made a tank too wide to launch itself into the sea from an off-shore landing craft, making their use in amphibious landings impractical. Instead, Straussler devised an alternative, the flotation screen. This was a folding canvas screen, supported by horizontal metal hoops and vertical rubber tubes filled with compressed air. The screen covered the top half of the tank and provided buoyancy in the water. When collapsed, it would not interfere with the tank's mobility or combat effectiveness.

Straussler was allocated a Tetrarch tank for experimentation and it was fitted with a screen together with a marine propeller that took its drive from the tank's engine. The two forms of propulsion - propeller and tracks - gave rise to the term Duplex Drive ("DD") for such tanks.

The first trial of the DD Tetrarch took place in June 1941 in Brent Reservoir (also known as Hendon Reservoir) in North London in front of General Alan Brooke (Commander-in-Chief, Home Forces at the time), who was an early enthusiast for the idea. Coincidentally, this was also where trials of a floating version of the British Mark IX tank had taken place in November 1918. Satisfactory sea trials of the Tetrarch took place near Hayling Island and the go-ahead was given to develop a production DD tank based on the Valentine tank. This version never saw combat and was mainly used to train crews who subsequently served in the DD versions of the M4 Sherman, one of a number of modified, special purpose tanks ("Hobart's Funnies") that saw action during and after the Normandy landings.

He continued to work on adapting the DD system to other British vehicles, including the Churchill tank, the Cromwell, the Centurion and even the "Ronson" Carrier, a flame-thrower equipped version of the Universal Carrier although none of these went into production. Post-war tanks were generally too heavy to be made amphibious with a flotation screen, but lighter military vehicles such as early versions of the American M2 Bradley and the British FV432 continued to successfully use the system into the 1980s.

Another of his wartime projects was the Straussler Conversion. This was an experimental modification of the Ordnance QF 17 pounder and Ordnance QF 32 pounder anti-tank guns. The guns were fitted with motorized gun-carriages. A modified ammunition limber would be attached to the gun's trails, effectively making a four-wheeled, self-propelled vehicle and removing the need for a truck to tow the gun. The idea of equipping large artillery pieces with engines, to give a limited amount of independent mobility, would be eventually adopted post–war with guns like the FH-70.

== Post-war work ==
Straussler worked on a variety of automotive projects after the war. Although many were connected in some way with amphibious vehicles, they included the Lypsoid Tyre — a very low-pressure, off-road, run-flat tyre that saw some use with military and construction vehicles, including the Fabrique Nationale AS 24 lightweight transport vehicle. In October 1957, Straussler was charged with violating British export controls. A 'semi-military' truck fitted with his off-road wheels was sent, with permission, to the Netherlands for demonstration purposes. But it was then sent from there to Hungary - this was illegal as that country was behind the Iron Curtain. Straussler was given an absolute discharge (i.e. found guilty, but no punishment was imposed); his company was fined £500 and he and his company shared the costs of the prosecution.

He continued working into his old age — the last of his 30 patents was filed in 1964. He died on 3 June 1966 in London.
