= Ferenc Gebauer =

Austrian-born Hungarian firearms designer and pilot

Ferenc Gebauer (25 June 1888 – 1958) was an Austrian-born Hungarian firearms designer and pilot during the First World War.

== Early life and career ==
Gebauer was born as Franz Gebauer on 25 June 1888 in Velké Heraltice | (Groß Herrlitz in German) in Austria-Hungary to Wawra Józefa. From 1901 to 1911 he worked as a plant manager for a car factory in Germany, then went to work for the Puch motorcycle factory in Graz, Austria from 1911 to 1914. He served in World War I in the Austro-Hungarian Air Force (KuK Luftfahrtruppen) as a car courier officer of the army headquarters (August 21, 1914 to March 1915), a field pilot on the Italian front from May 25, 1916 to September 3, 1917, a factory pilot at the Aspern Phönix Flugzeugwerke aircraft factory from September 3, 1917 to September 1918 and finally served as a gunsmith at the Fischamend Air Base in 1918 until the war ended.

In 1920 he worked, in an unofficial capacity, for the Technical Experimental Weapon Division of the Royal Hungarian Honvéd, tasked with developing weapons in secret from the Allied forces. In 1924, Gebauer went to work for Danuvia until 1936. He became a citizen of Hungary and changed his name from the German Franz to the Hungarian Ferenc on February 17, 1930. He worked for the József Nádor University of Technology and Economics (now Budapest University of Technology and Economics) starting in 1939, but was forced to flee from Austria during the German occupation of Hungary. In March 1944, with the invasion of Hungary by the USSR, Gebauer fled to Sweden to work for Bofors, where he worked as the chief designer of the Bofors arms factory until his death in 1958.

He was awarded the following medals during his lifetime:

- Knight's Cross of the Hungarian Order of Merit
- Hungarian Crown Bronze Medal on an emerald green ribbon
- Silver Medal of Valor, First Class
- Silver Valor Medal, Second Class (Awarded twice)
- Károly Team Cross
- Camp Pilot Badge
- Knight's Cross of the Order of the Italian Crown

== Firearms design ==
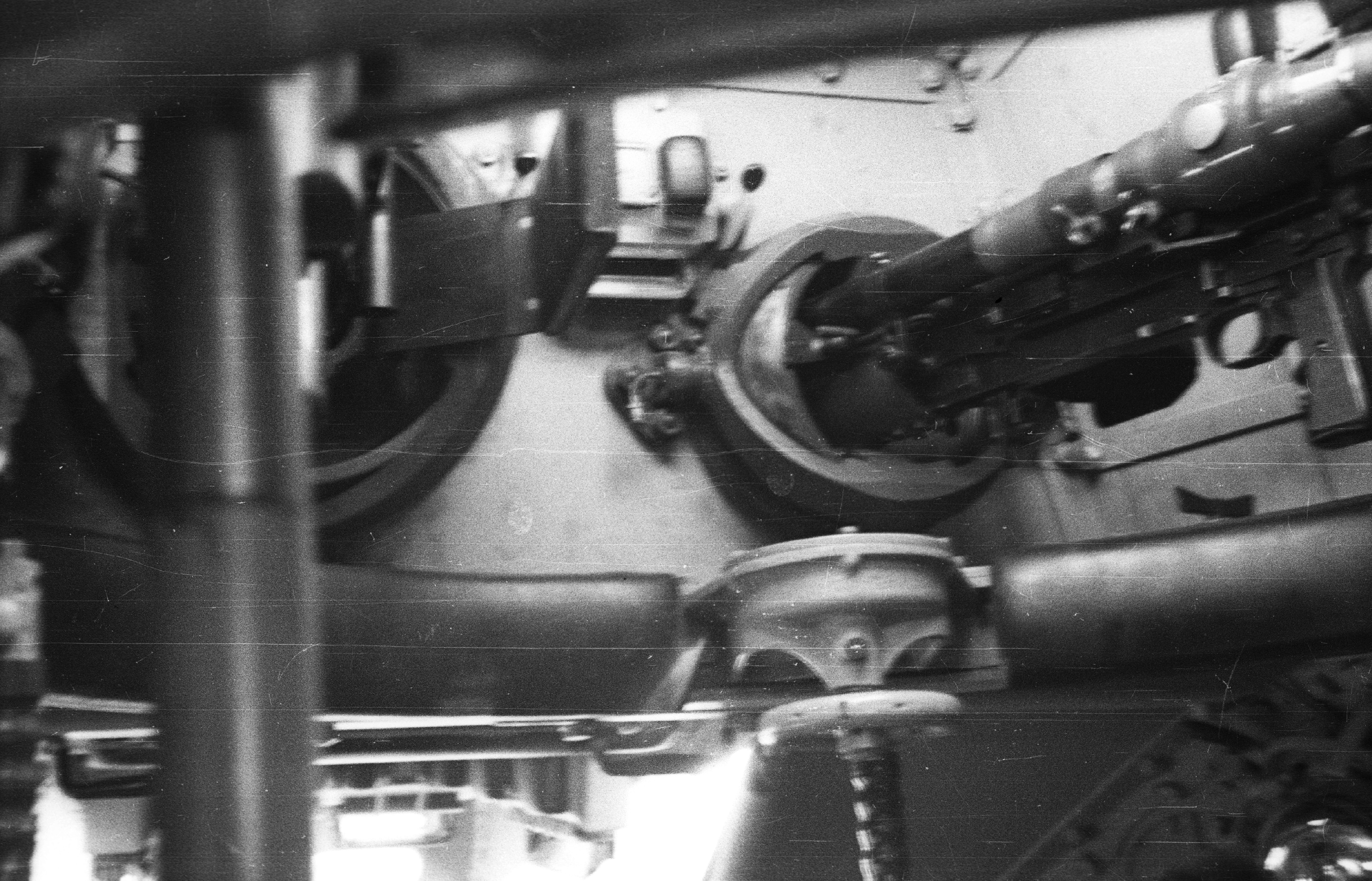
An 8 mm Gebauer machine gun from inside a 39M Csaba armoured car's turret.

Noting that the model 07/12 Schwarzlose machine gun was prone to freezing up in the higher altitudes above the Italian Alps, Gebauer decided that the current practice of adapting standard infantry machine guns was outmoded, as the propeller synchronization only controlled the timing, and not the operation, of these weapons. He decided that an aircraft machine gun needed to fire based on the propeller shaft so it was not dependent upon gas-operation. Colonel Uzelac of the K.u.K. Luftfahrtruppen – Fliegerarsenal (Austro-Hungarian Aviation Troops) was impressed by the inventor's ideas and pushed through plans for three prototypes to be created over four months.

Trials started in 1917, and in June 1918 the test pilots gave favorable results to the third prototype. This resulted in the creation of the Gebauer Machine Gun 1918.M (GMP 1918.M), of which 100 (later 500) were ordered from the Öfam-Sollux Company. While the 1918.M was developed too late for practical use in World War I, it was tested on various types of aircraft, including the Albatros D.III, Halberstadt D.II, Fokker D.VII, and WKF D.I. The 1918.M led to further designs and refinement, eventually culminating in the Gebauer GKM Machine Gun 1940.M. Gebauer held 20 firearm patents, some in his name and others with Danuvia.

== Notable weapons ==
GKM = Gebauer Kényszermeghajtású Motorgéppuska (Gebauer Positive-Driven Motor-Machine Gun)
Model	Caliber	Feed Type	Length	Weight	Rate of Fire	Muzzle Energy	Muzzle Velocity	Installed On	Notes
Gebauer Machine Gun 1918.M	8×50mmR Mannlicher	Belt, 500 rounds per barrel	1150 mm	42.5 kg	1,500 rpm			WKF D.I	Double-barreled. Not used in combat due to the end of World War I. As it was driven directly by the engine's speed, the rate of fire varied. RoF listed represents the maximum rounds/min. On the WKF D.I, this also reduced the engine's power by up to 10%.
Gebauer Machine Gun 1926/31.M	7.92×57mm Mauser	Belt, 500 rounds per barrel	1150 mm	15.5 kg (single); 42.5 kg (double)	1,330 rpm (per barrel)			Fiat CR.32 IMAM Ro.37 Heinkel He 46 Weiss WM-16 Budapest Weiss WM-21 Sólyom	Installed in both single and double barrel configurations.
Gebauer 1934.M GKM	7.92×57mm Mauser	Drum, 100 cartridges	1100 mm	9.5 kg	1,200 rpm	3569.87 J	730 m/s	Caproni Ca.101 Caproni Ca.310 Heinkel He 46 Heinkel He 70K Blitz Junkers Ju 86 K-2 Weiss WM-16 Budapest Weiss WM-21 Sólyom	Designed to be used by aircraft as an observer's weapon, the 1934.M used a gas-operated system, with shells ejecting from the left side, and was fed by a 100-round "Horváth" drum, which offered double the capacity of guns used on other aircraft. On June 11, 1935, Italian technical officers visited Danuvia, where Ferenc Gebauer presented the guests with three machine guns, two of which were the 1934M and 1934/A models.
Gebauer Tank Machine Gun 1934/37.M & 1934/37.A M	7.92×57mm Mauser; 8×56mmR (A M model)	Drum, 100 cartridges	1120 mm	11.5 kg (M model); 9.5 kg (A M model)	1,000-1,200 rpm	3569.87 J	790 m/s	Straussler V-4 39M Csaba 38M Toldi	Version of the 1934.M developed in 1937 for use on tanks and was also used by gunboats in anti-aircraft installations.
Gebauer GKM Machine Gun 1934/40.M	8×56mmR	Belt, 100 cartridges	1034 mm	16.9 kg	1,000 rpm	3569.87 J	730 m/s	40M Turán 43M Turán III 44M Tas	Almost identical to the 1934/37A.M except shorter, a bit heavier, and belt-fed.
Gebauer Machine Gun 1939.M	8×56mmR	Belt, 200 rounds for anti-air gun, 500 (possibly 600) rounds for aircraft mounted gun	985 mm	18.2 kg	2,000 rpm	3569.87 J	730 m/s	Heinkel He 112 Weiss Manfréd WM-23 Ezüst Nyíl	Only wing-mounted Gebauer machine gun. Gas-operated. Could fire as fast as 2,038 rpm. Was not developed further and only few were produced as 8 mm machine guns were deemed as too weak for defeating aircraft in 1939.
Gebauer GKM Machine Gun 1940.M	12.7x81mmSR	Belt, 600 rounds (300 per barrel)	1290 mm	15.5 kg (single); 44 kg (double)	2,000 rpm (double barrel)	1,200 J	800 m/s	Fiat CR.42 Falco MÁVAG Héja II Weiss Manfréd WM-23 Ezüst Nyíl	Installed in both single and double barrel configurations. Engine-driven machine gun. Some sources say rate of fire was as high as 2,600 rpm for the double barrel gun (1,300 rpm per barrel). Chambered for the same ammunition as the Italian 12.7 mm Breda-SAFAT. In 1943 Italy purchased the licence to produce the Gebauer 1940.M GKM, although it is unknown if the Italians made any.
