= 39M Csaba =

Hungarian WW2 armoured car

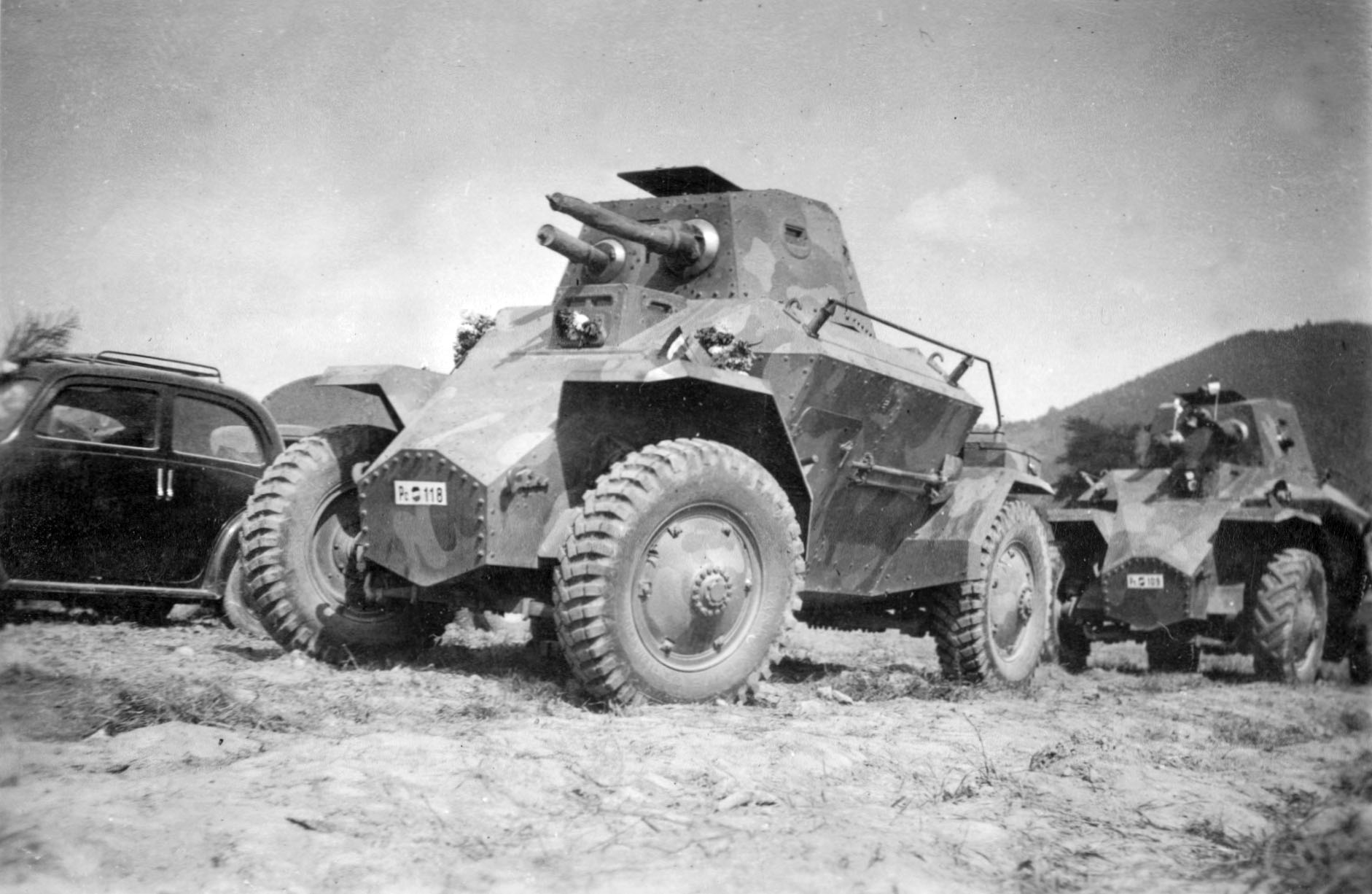
- 39M Csaba armoured scout car (1940)
- Type: Armoured car
- Place of origin: Kingdom of Hungary

Service history
- In service: 1939 - 1945
- Used by: Hungarian Army
- Wars: Second World War

Production history
- Designer: Nicholas Straussler
- Designed: 1930s
- Manufacturer: Weiss Manfred, Csepel
- Produced: 1939 - 1944
- No. built: 102-137

Specifications
- Mass: 5.95 tonnes
- Length: 14 ft 8 in (4.52 m)
- Width: 6 ft 10 in (2.1 m)
- Height: 7 ft 4 in (2.27 m)
- Crew: 3
- Armour: 9 mm
- Main armament: 1 × 20 mm Solothurn 36M anti-tank cannon
- Secondary armament: 1 × 8 mm Gebauer 1934/37M coaxial machine gun 1 × 8 mm detachable Solothurn light machine gun
- Engine: Ford, 8-cylinder 90 hp
- Operational range: 93 mi (150 km)
- Maximum speed: 65-85 km/h (40-53 mph)

The 39M Csaba (t͡ʃɒbɒ) was a Hungarian armoured car used for liaison and reconnaissance. It was produced for the Royal Hungarian Army during World War II and used extensively on the Eastern Front fighting against the Soviet Union.

== Development and use ==
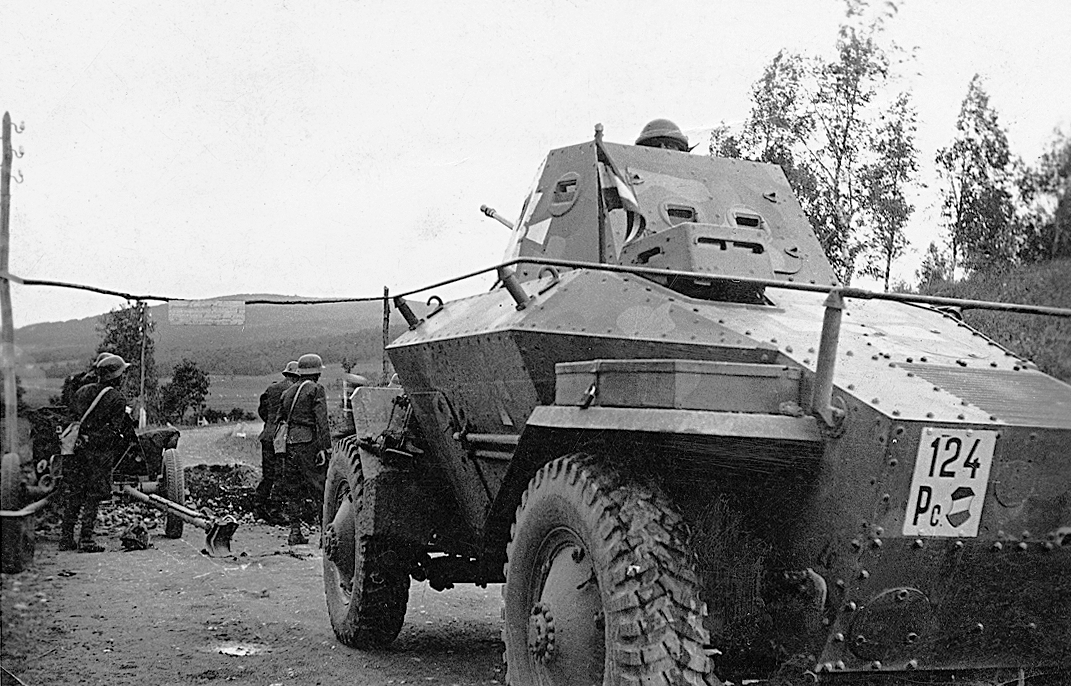
Rear view of a 39M Csaba, showing the reverse, driving position

In 1932 Hungarian engineer Miklós Straussler designed and built the prototype of the four-wheel drive AC1 armoured car at the Weiss Manfréd factory in Csepel. The vehicle had no armour and was shipped to England where it was fitted with it. This was followed by the AC2 in 1935, also delivered to England. The prototypes were followed in 1937 by the designer, who left Hungary for good. In 1937, the Alvis Straussler joint venture was formed in Coventry, which produced the first AC3 which was ordered by the Netherlands, Portugal and UK for colonial territories. Weiss Manfréd supplied the chassis, while Alvis Straussler fitted the engine, gearbox, armour and weapons.

Weiss Manfréd began production of the first light armoured AC2s in 1938, which were tested in 1939 and became the basis for the production armoured car, the 39M Csaba (named after the son of Attila the Hun). Straussler was not involved in the finishing work on the Csaba. Following the production of the 8 test examples, Weiss Manfréd received an order for 53 fully armoured Csaba, which were completed between spring 1940 and summer 1941.

The armoured reconnaissance vehicle was up to the world standard of similar armoured scout cars of the time, although it was of short range. As the characteristics of the Csaba met the requirements of the Hungarian Army, then it ordered 50 units at the end of 1941 (32 of which were delivered in 1942, 18 in 1943), followed by an order for 70 units in January 1943, 12 of which were delivered in 1943 and 20 in 1944. In all, 135 Csaba reconnaissance vehicles were built, of which 30 were 40M command variants. A further 18 Csaba turrets were delivered to the Danube flotilla for arming minesweepers and patrol boats, making a total of 143 vehicles and 161 turrets produced.

Not a single Csaba armoured vehicle survives.

In 1943 two cars, numbered RR511 & RR512, were painted blue for use by police units.

The Csaba had a 20 mm Solothurn anti-tank cannon and a coaxial 8 mm Gebauer 1934/37M machine gun fixed on a centrally mounted turret, with 9 mm armoured plating. The 20 mm cannon had 200 shells in 5 shell capacity magazines, for a total of 40 magazines. Meanwhile, the coaxial 8 mm Gebauer machine gun had 3000 rounds in 100 round metal belts. The vehicle was also equipped with a detachable 8 mm Solothurn light machine gun fired through the rear hatch in the anti-aircraft role. The crew could dismount and carry this LMG when conducting reconnaissance on foot. It also had two driving positions – one at the front as normal, and an additional one at the rear.

The 40M Csaba was a command version armed only with the turret-mounted 8 mm machine gun. This vehicle was fitted with a second R-4T radio, which had a large lattice radio mast.

The first Reconnaissance Battalion of Budapest's vehicles were marked with a lightning flash, as well as the Magyar Cross. The Magyar Cross was also seen on vehicles in Transylvania in September 1940, as well as in Yugoslavia and Russia in 1941. John Baumann speculates that the red and green cross may have served as an aiming point so it was later changed to a white cross on a grey/black background. Before October–November 1944, no German markings were found on 39Ms.

The first 61 vehicles were assigned to the 1st Mechanized Brigade, the 2nd Mechanized Brigade, 1st Armored Division, 2nd Armored Division, and 1st Mountain Brigade. Three 39Ms served with the 1st Mountain Brigade, while the other units received ten 39Ms, one 40M, and two vehicles used for training. All except the 1st Mountain Brigade served in Operation Barbarossa. Combat use showed that the 39M should not be used outside of its reconnaissance role, with only 17 units having survived from those sent to the front by December 1941. The 1st Cavalry brigade lost 18 39Ms in December 1942. 48 combat-ready vehicles were available by the summer of 1944, which were assigned to four Hungarian infantry divisions, which fought in Galicia along with cavalry divisions. The number of 39Ms gradually decreased further and further starting in Autumn of 1944.

== Gallery ==
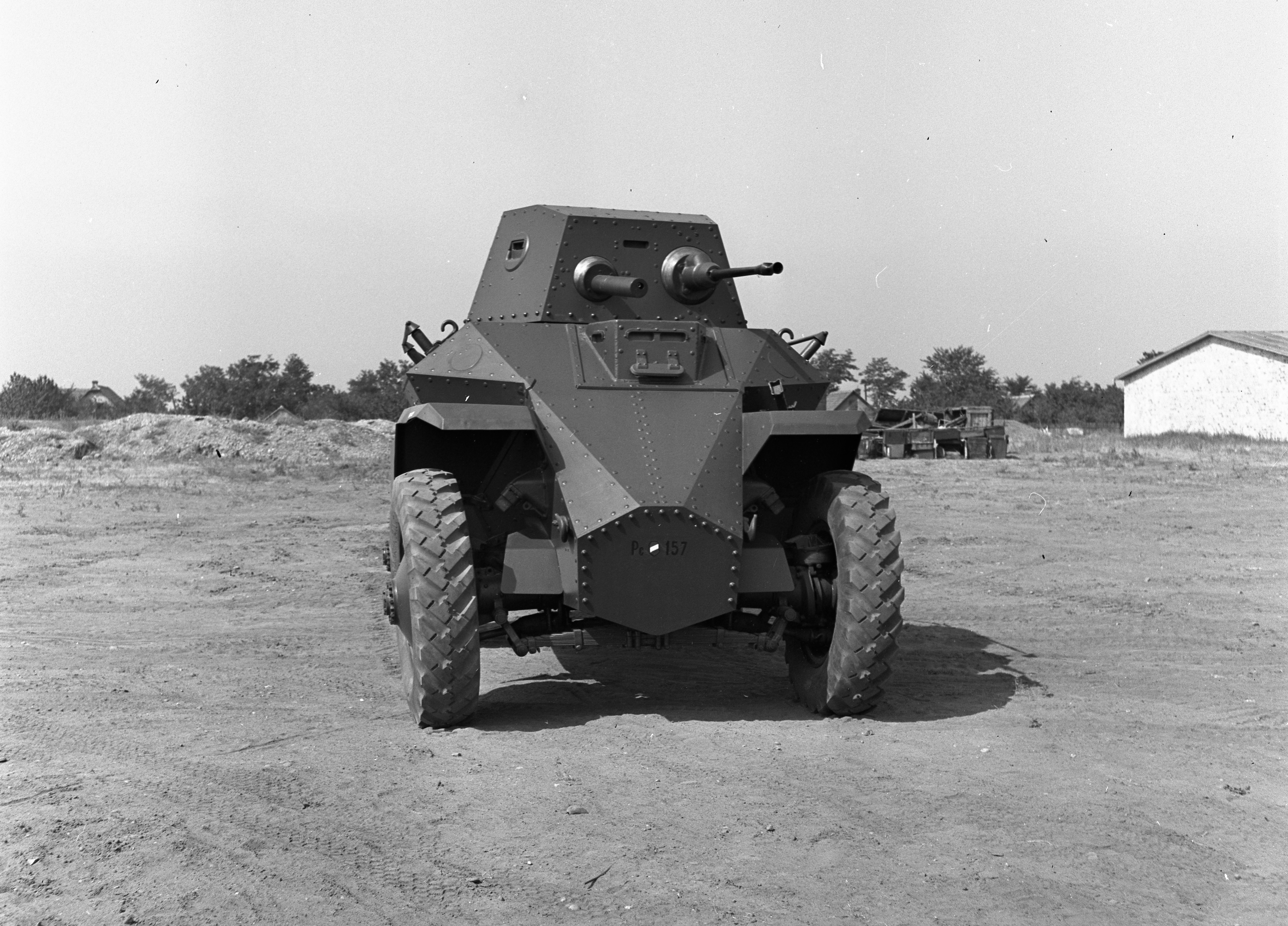
Front view of a 39M Csaba

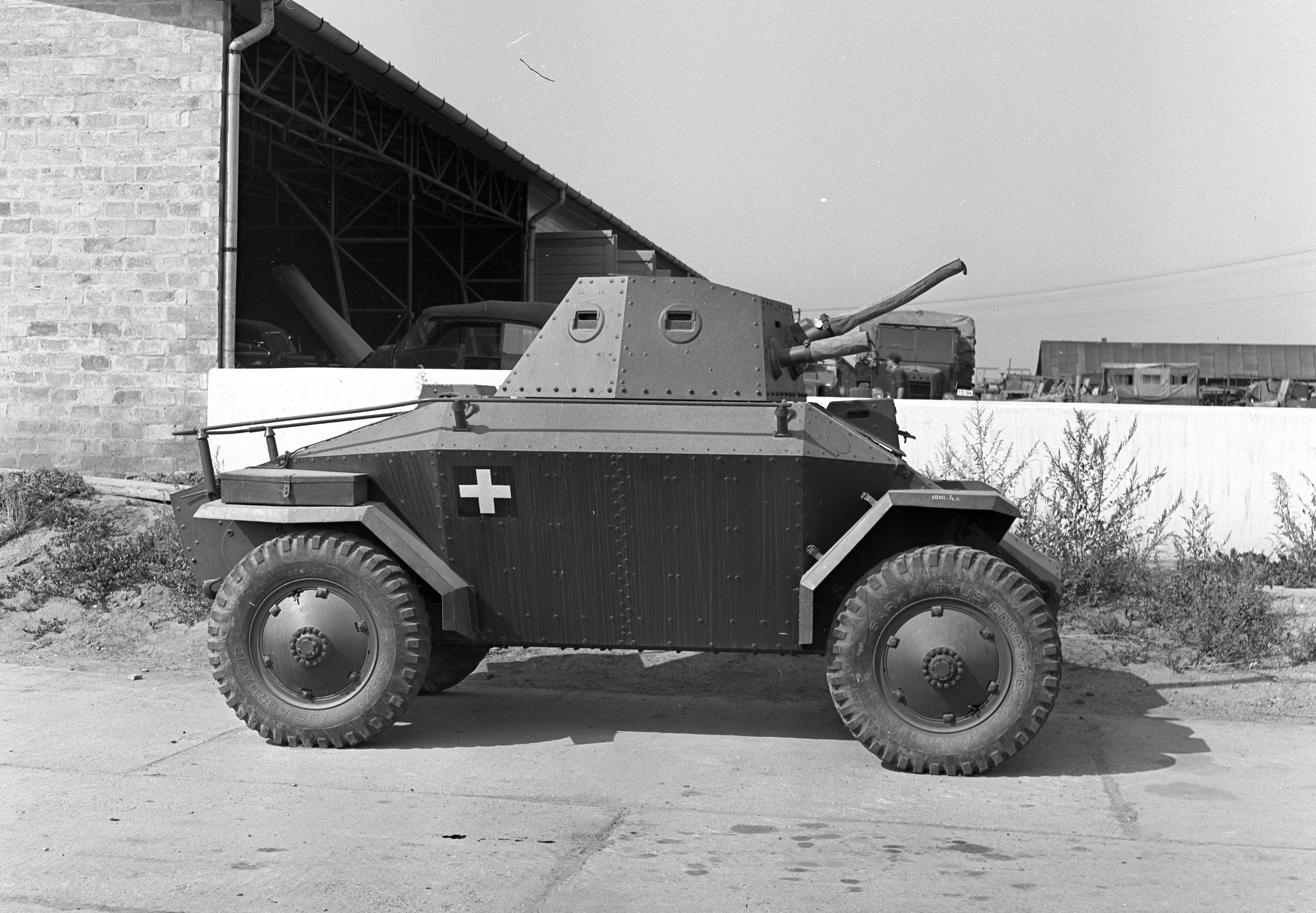
Side view of a 39M Csaba

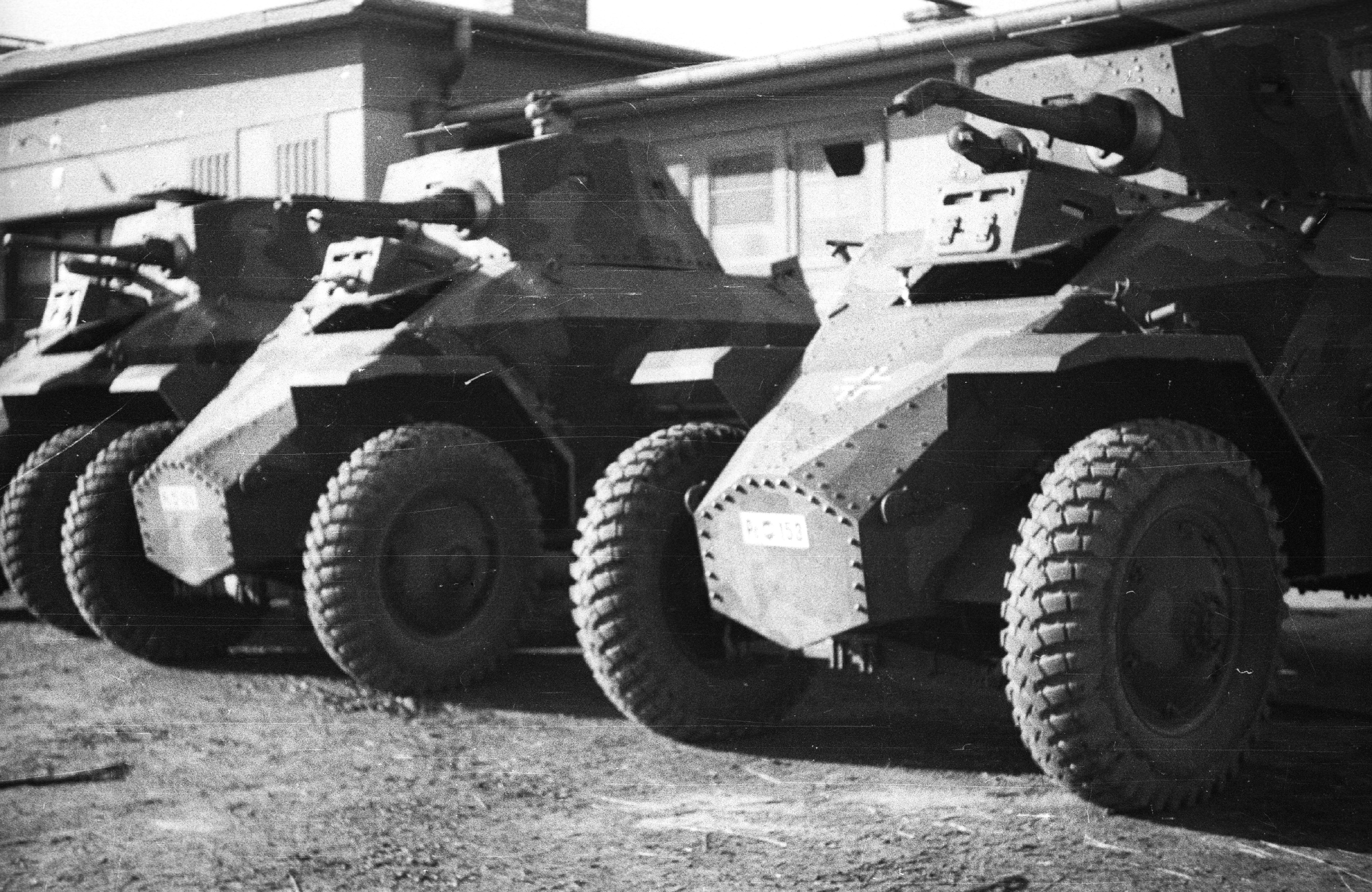
39M Csaba armoured cars in 1940

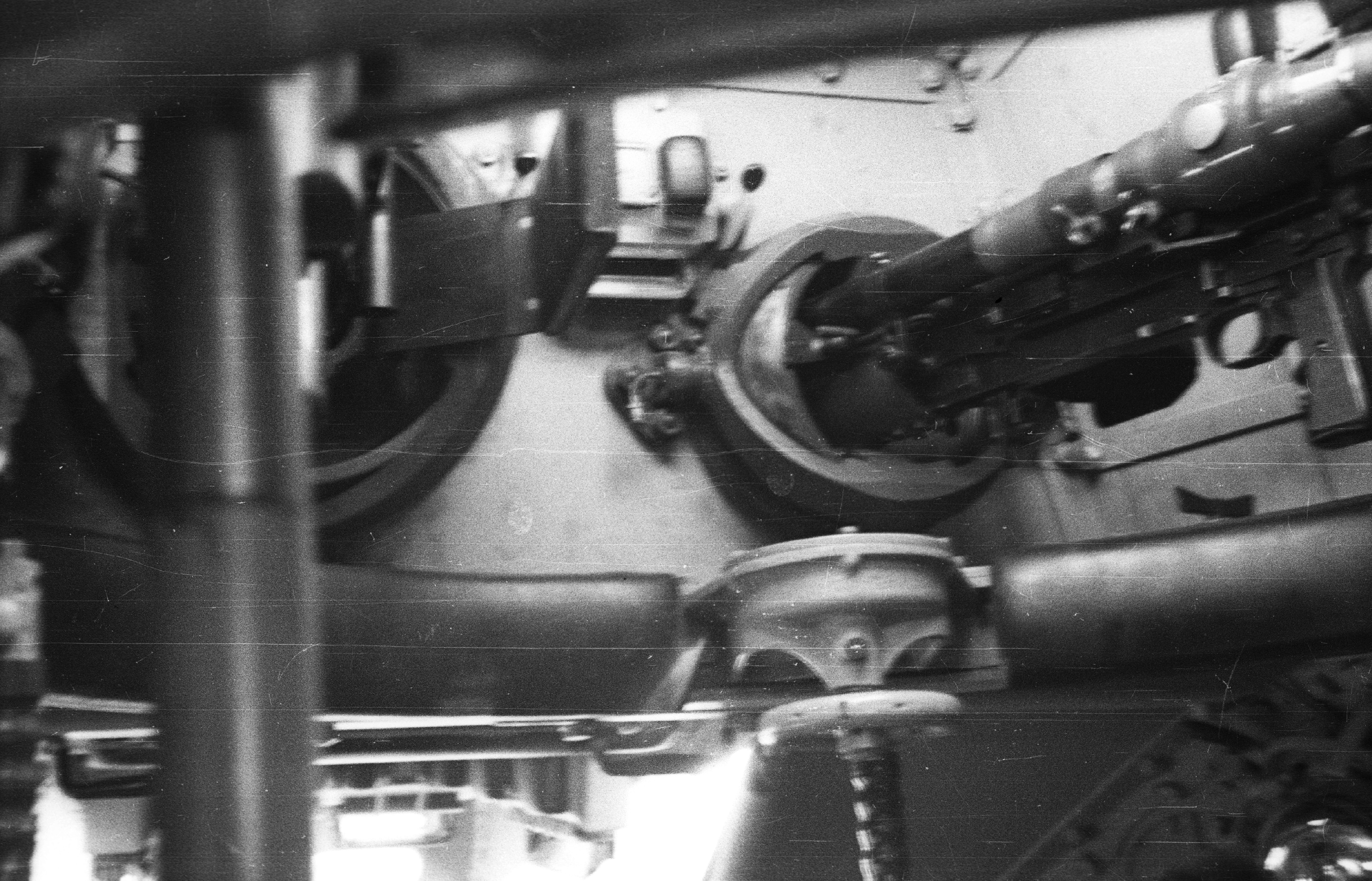
Interior of a 39M Csaba showing the coaxial Gebauer machine gun

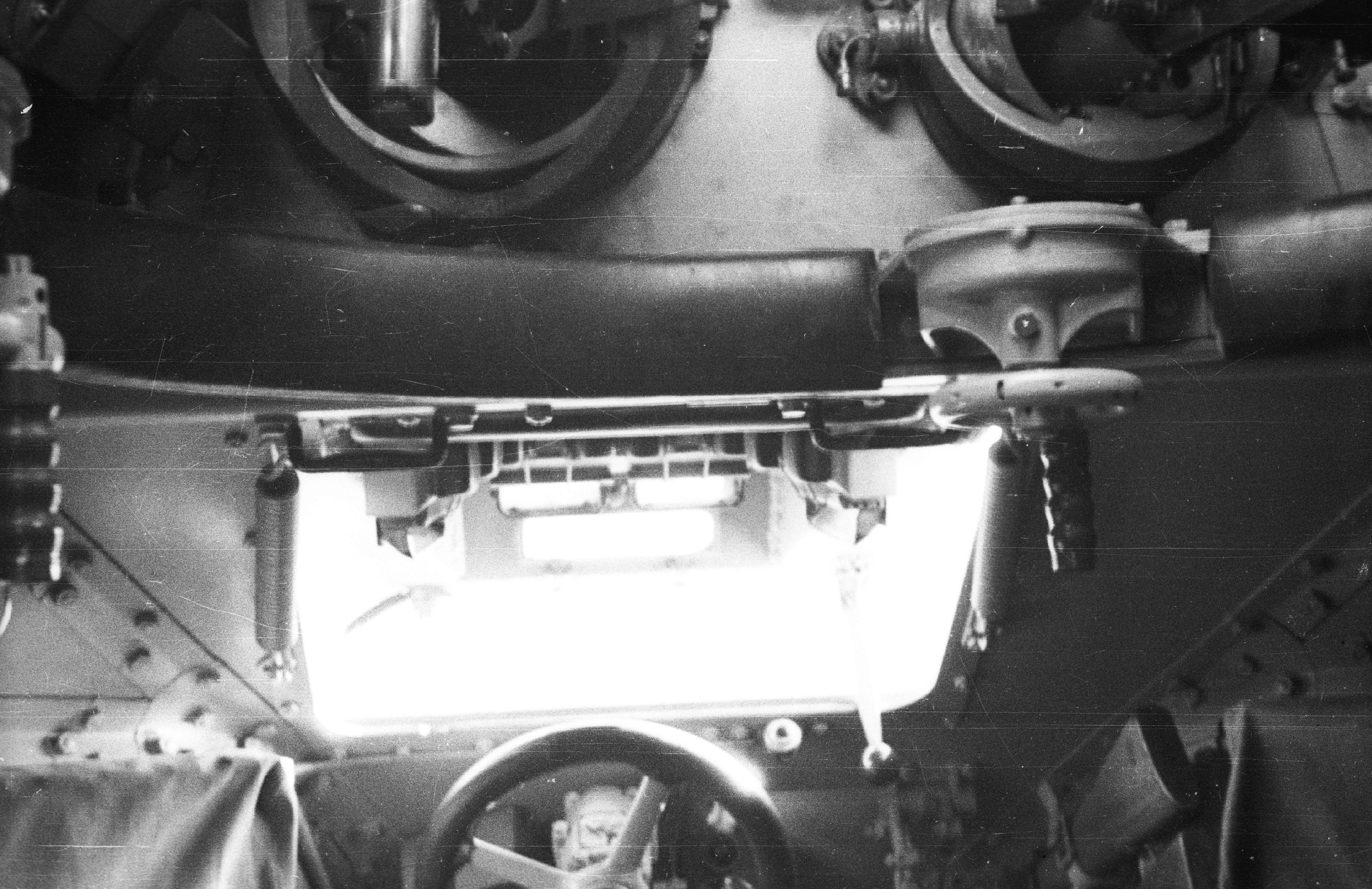
Interior of a 39M Csaba from the driver's position

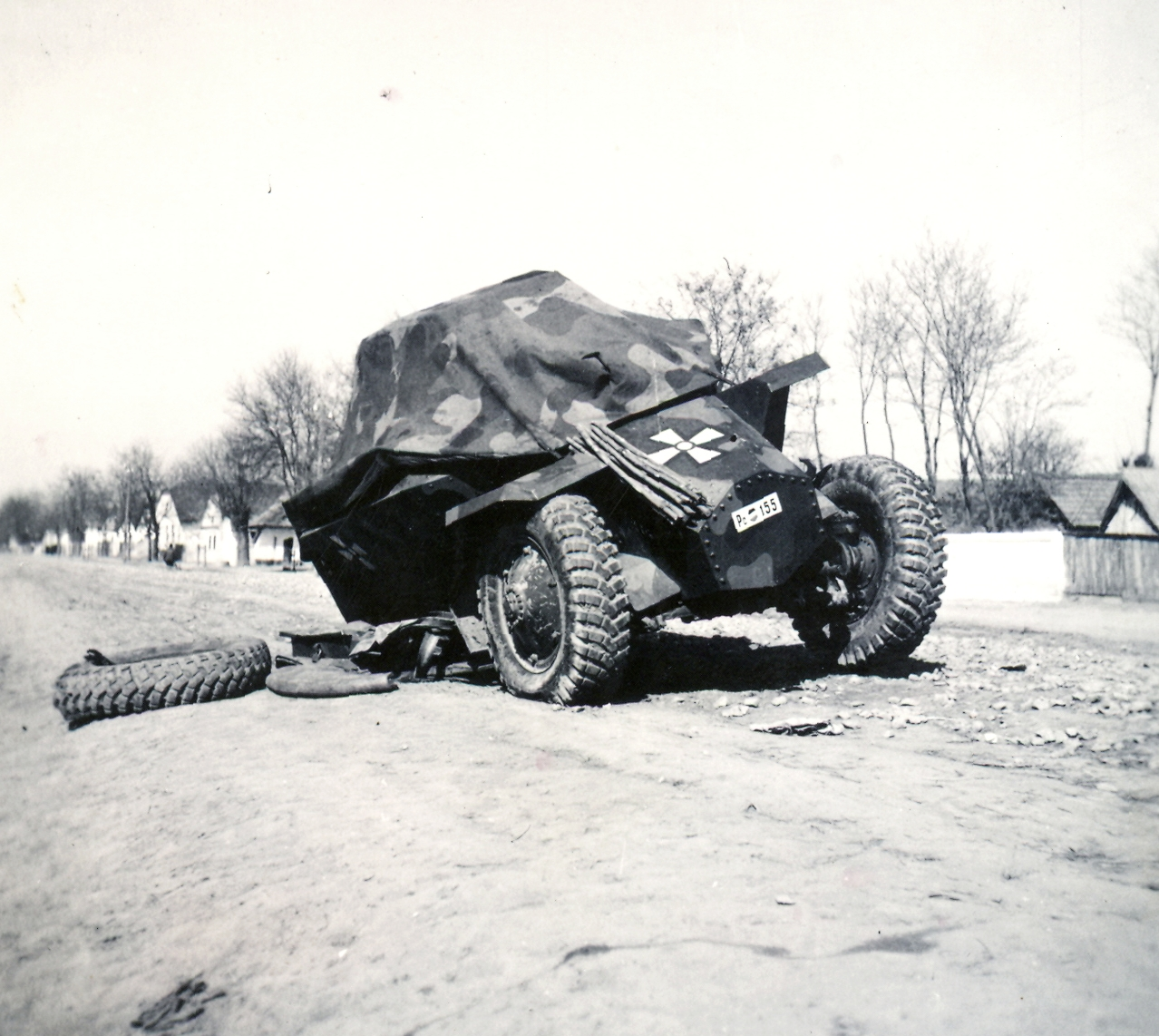
A 39M Csaba damaged by a landmine and with the turret covered in Serbia, 1941, during the Invasion of Yugoslavia

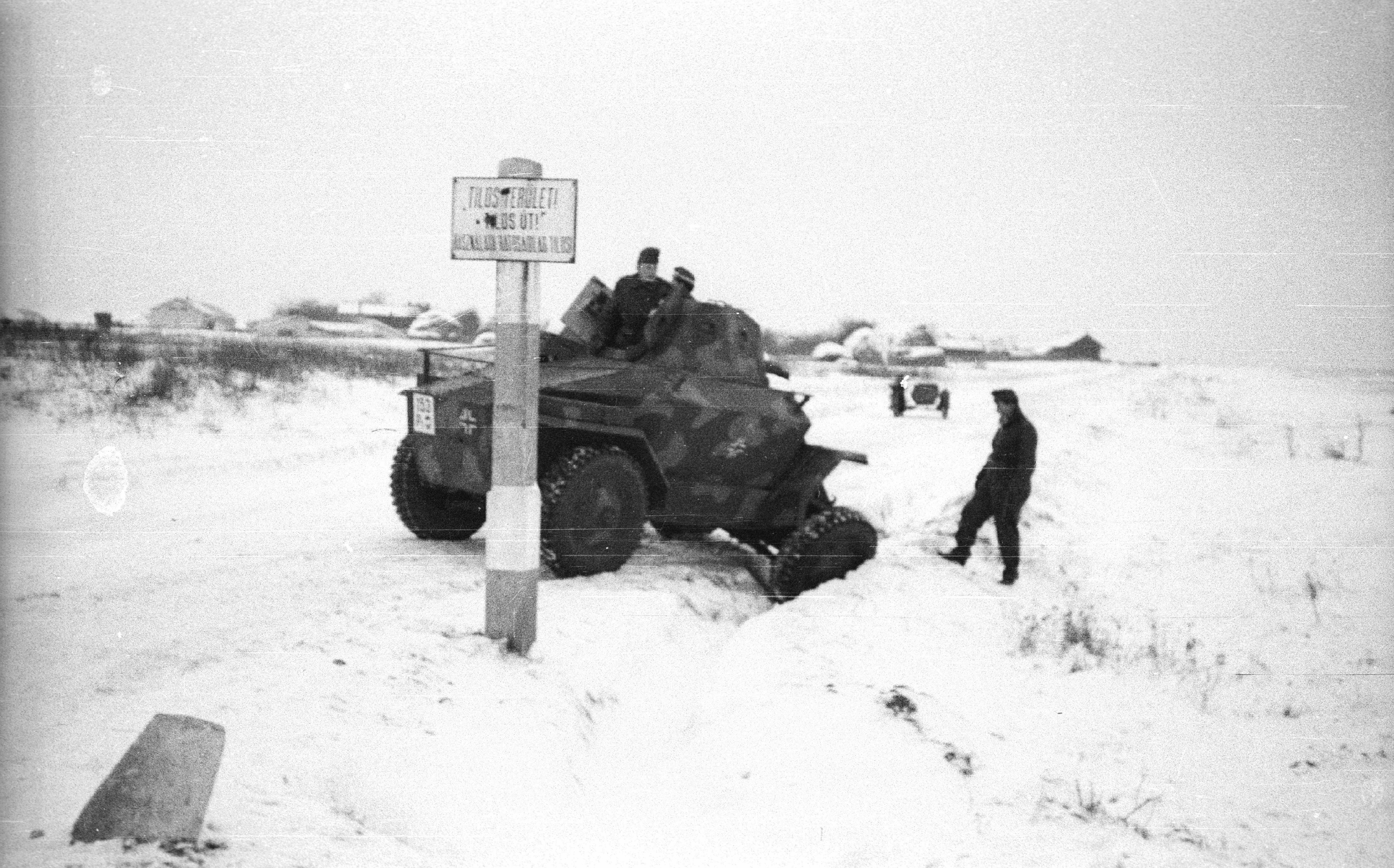
A 39M Csaba stuck in a ditch, 1940

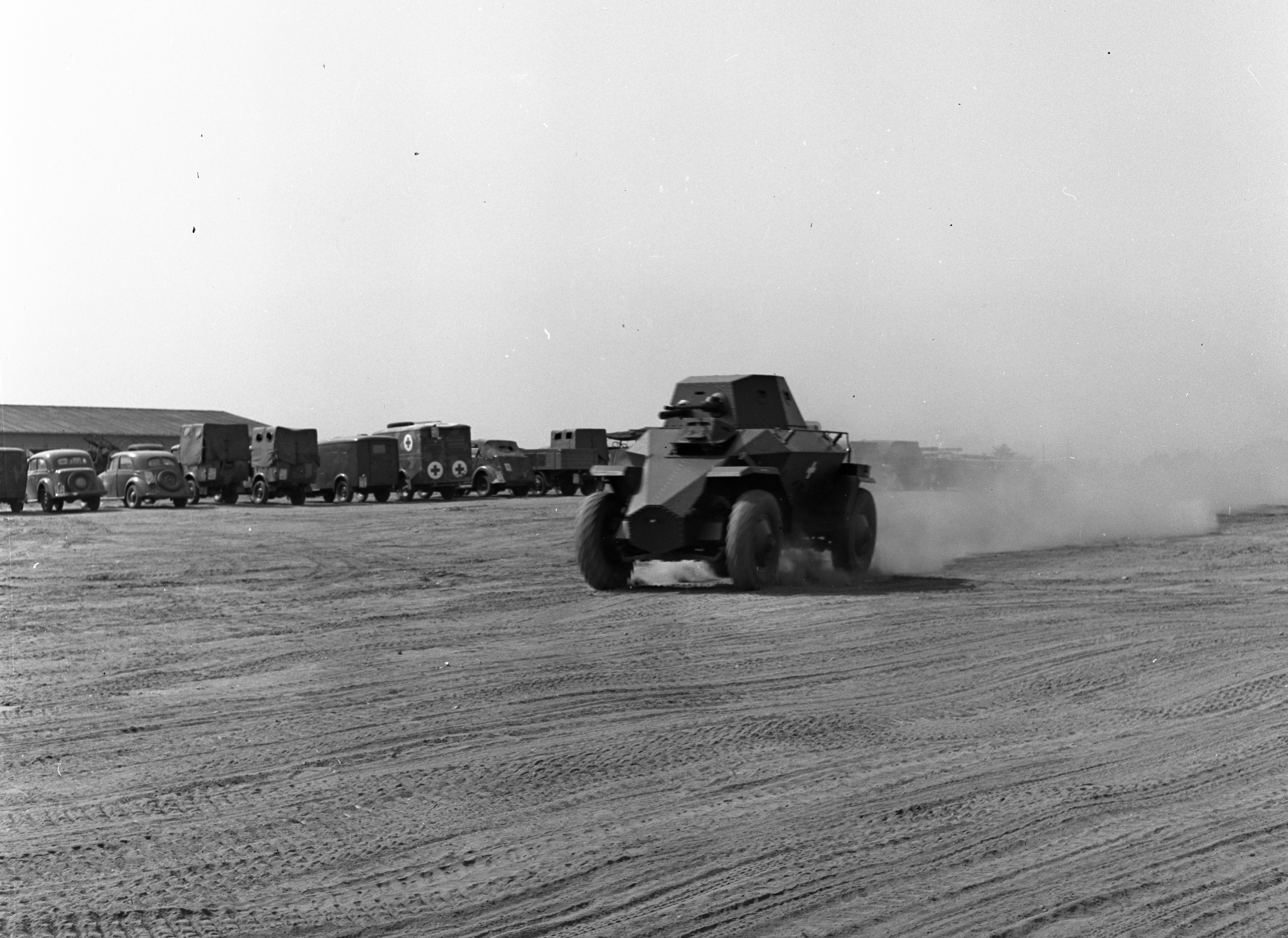
A 39M Csaba driving at speed, 1943
