= 38M Toldi =

Hungarian light tank of World War II

Toldi light tank
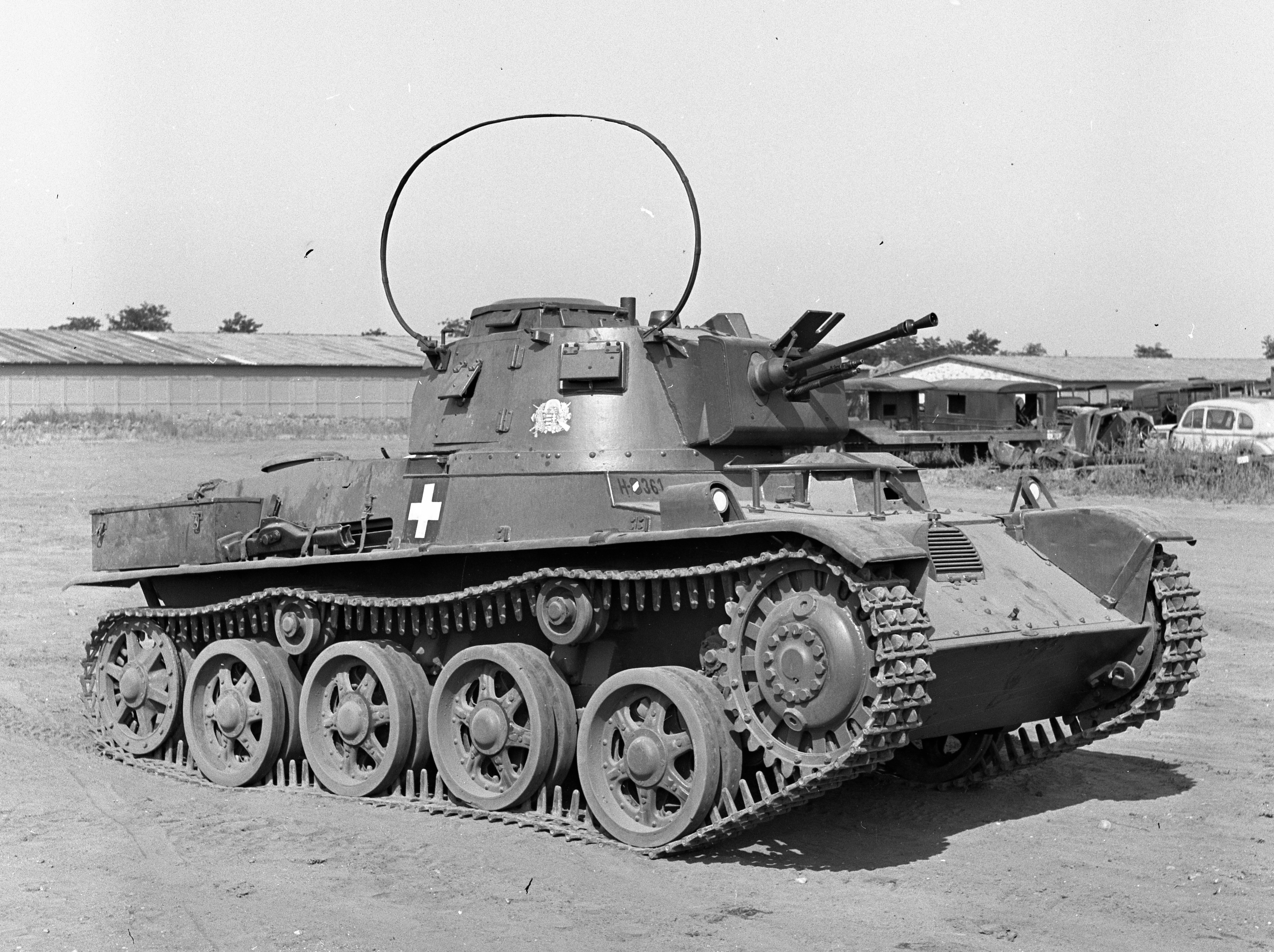
- 38M Toldi I light tank
- Type: Light tank
- Place of origin: Kingdom of Hungary

Service history
- In service: 1939–1945
- Used by: Kingdom of Hungary
- Wars: World War II

Production history
- Designer: MÁVAG; AB Landsverk
- Designed: 1936–1938
- Manufacturer: MÁVAG; Ganz Works
- Produced: 1939–1944
- No. built: 202
- Variants: 38M Toldi I 38M Toldi II; 42M Toldi IIA; 43M Toldi III; Toldi Páncélvadász (tank destroyer)

Specifications
- Mass: Toldi I: 8.5 t Toldi IIA: 9.35 t Toldi III: 9.45 t
- Length: 4.75 m (15 ft 7 in)
- Width: 2.14 m (7 ft 0 in)
- Height: 1.87 m (6 ft 2 in)
- Crew: 3
- Armor: Toldi I: 7–13 mm Toldi II: 7–23 mm Toldi III: 7–35 mm
- Main armament: 20 mm Solothurn 36M gun (Note: known as '36M 20mm Nehézpuska') (Toldi I/II); 40 mm 37/42M L/42.5 or L/45 gun (Toldi IIA/III)
- Secondary armament: 1x 8 mm (0.31 in) Gebauer machine gun
- Engine: Büssing-NAG L8V 7.9 litres (earlier production vehicles); Ganz VIII VGT 107 (later production vehicles); 155–160 bhp
- Power/weight: 16–19 hp/t
- Suspension: torsion bar
- Operational range: 200 km (120 mi)
- Maximum speed: 50 km/h (31 mph) on road
- Steering system: clutch braking

The Toldi was a Hungarian light tank of World War II, developed on the basis of the Swedish Landsverk L-60. It was named after the 14th century Hungarian knight Miklós Toldi. The Toldi was made in several different variants including some armed with a 20 mm gun, some armed with a 40 mm gun, some fitted with schürzen plates, and even a prototype tank destroyer variant armed with a 75 mm gun. At least one was even fitted with heavy anti-tank rocket launchers.

== Development and production ==
The Hungarian general staff wanted a modern light tank as soon as possible, after the domestically developed V-4 turned out to be too expensive by 1936 and work on it progressed slower than expected.

Meanwhile, the Swedish AB Landsverk finished its recent development, the Landsverk L-60 in October, and was looking for a customer to cover the costs. After a series of trials in 1937-38 with the V-4 and the Panzer I, the MÁVAG heavy industries decided to purchase the license of the L-60, with a prototype for further development.

The turret of the vehicle was then modified, making space for the radio and other devices, with a cupola being placed on top (since the L-60 was still unfinished and lacked in many necessary features). The original main armament, the 20 mm Madsen was also replaced initially by a 25 mm Bofors autocannon, and then by the 20 mm Solothurn anti-tank rifle, as it was already in service in the Hungarian army. The hull would then be changed on the front, upper sides, and rear, to riveted plates instead of welded for faster and easier production, with the original Scania-Vabis 1664 engine being replaced by the German Büssing-NAG L8V.

At first, 80 vehicles were ordered from MÁVAG, then an order for 110 more vehicles were placed in 1940. In total, 202 units were produced.

== Variants ==
- 38M Toldi I (A20) - first variant armed with a 20 mm Solothurn anti-tank rifle, 80 made. The very first few Toldis received the older versions of 20 mm AT rifles with their sizeable magazines, so a small bump was formed on the turret roof to make it easier to insert the magazines. With the introduction of the new magazines, this became unnecessary and the other Toldis no longer had such "bump". At the beginning of the production (similarly to the Soviet and Italian armored vehicles of the time) there were many errors due to inexperience, so broken welds, armor cracks and casting errors in the track links were common.
- 38M Toldi II (B20) - 110 made. This version was equipped with more reliable engines manufactured under license by Ganz instead of the imported Büssing-NAGs. Furthermore, the suspensions were improved with stronger torsion springs. These vehicles were extremely reliable (compared to the Soviet and German tanks of the time) and were able to achieve a service life of 7-8000 kms with one planned factory repair. These vehicles were fitted with a slightly increased turret, which provided better placement of the radio and slightly better comfort. With the help of the large emergency exit hatches, the crew could quickly leave the damaged tanks. The radios were also changed from R/5 radios with loop antennas to improved R/5a radios with stick antennas.
- 42M Toldi IIA (B40) - modification developed in 1942, armed with the 40 mm 37/42M gun and a larger turret. In 1943, 80 Toldis in the best condition were equipped with the gun and the additional armor plates, increasing the frontal protection to 35mm (280 BHN!).
- 43M Toldi III (C40) - improved variant with thicker armor, redesigned turret, increased ammo capacity and an upgraded drivetrain. Could mount perforated schürzen plates that were also tested on the Toldi IIA. According to recollections, 12 were made, but there is no written evidence of this, so it is possible that they were ordered and the production process had started, but never completed because of the bombing raids. At least one was fully completed however.
- Toldi Páncélvadász ('Toldi tank hunter') - Toldi I hull with a German 7.5 cm Pak 40 anti-tank gun in an open casemate. Only 1 prototype made since the Germans did not deliver the guns ordered and paid for due to the war situation.
- Toldi II armed with heavy anti-tank rocket launchers - modified Toldi II with its gun removed and a twin mount for 44M Buzogányvető heavy anti-tank rocket launchers mounted on the rear of its turret. One photograph is known to exist of this variant, so at least 1 made.
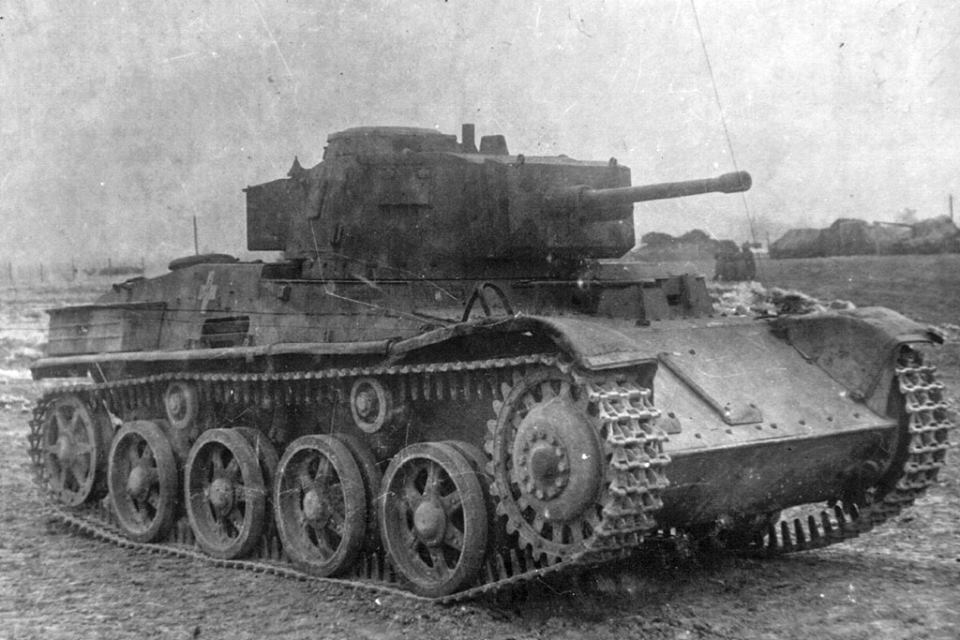
  42M Toldi IIA (B40)
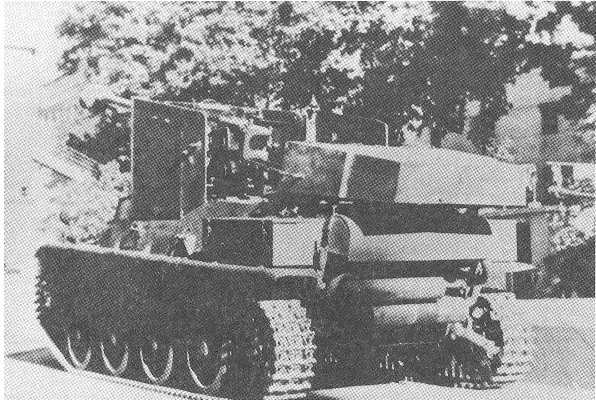
  Toldi Páncélvadász prototype in the courtyard of the Hungarian Institute of Military Technology (HTI) in the spring of 1944. This is the only known authentic photo of the prototype.

== Combat ==
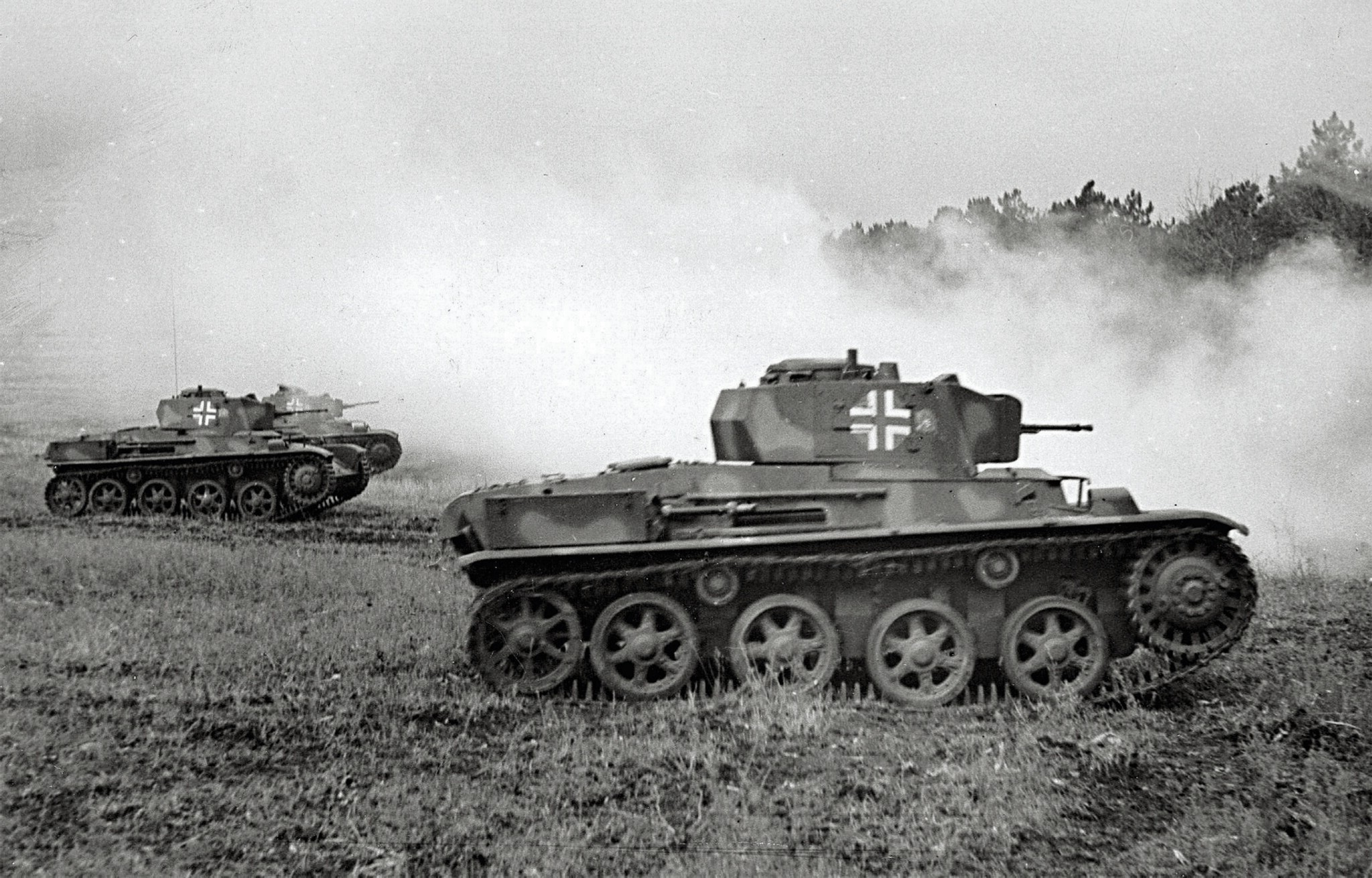
Hungarian Toldi tanks on the Eastern Front

The Toldi tanks first saw action with the Hungarian Army in the 1941 Invasion of Yugoslavia. These tanks were then mostly used against the USSR between 1941 and 1945. Because of their light armour, armament and good communications equipment, they were mostly used for reconnaissance. The design was effective against Soviet light tanks widespread during the early stages of Operation Barbarossa, such as the obsolete T-26 and BT-5. However it was totally inadequate against the Soviet T-34 medium tanks encountered during the later stages of the war on the Eastern Front. From 1940 to the end of 1942, Toldi tanks served in 22-vehicle-strong companies and there were also 7 tanks in the HQ sections.

After 1942, it was clear that the light tanks in service around the world at that time were no longer suitable for offensive operations. However, Toldi tanks were suitable for reconnaissance and flanking tasks. Furthermore, in order to save fuel and spare medium tanks, they were ideal for the basic training tank crews.

In light of this, from 1943 in the "Szabolcs" order of battle, the Toldi companies were disbanded and 5-5 Toldis were placed in the medium tank companies. In addition to training tasks, they performed the scouting and flanking missions for the unit. They were suitable for this thanks to better mobility, outstanding optics and good radios compared to T-60 and T-70 tanks. In addition, 9 Toldis were converted into medical evacuation vehicles. Thus, each medium tank company had 11-17 Turáns (due to the lack of vehicles, not every company was replenished as required) and 5 Toldis. In addition, each battalion and regiment HQ had 5 Toldis and 1 Medevac variant. Usually 50-50% were B20s and B40s in these units. The exception to this was the 1st Cavalry Division, which had no Toldis in its Turán companies. Two dozen A20 Toldis were used as command vehicles of the Nimród SPAA squadrons and Zrínyi assault gun companies. The rest were used for training purposes after 1943.

== Service history ==
The Toldi entered Hungarian service in 1940. They were used extensively in the Invasion of Yugoslavia and on the Eastern Front. From 1942, the Toldis were reassigned to reconnaissance, command and ambulance roles.

The Toldis fought throughout the war, but due to the siege of Budapest, the supply of spare parts ceased in late 1944, so the tanks began to suffer losses due to wear and tear too (by this time, all the Toldis and Nimróds had already accumulated more than 5,000 kms). Although it was ineffective against the T-34 and IS tanks, the Toldi B40 had a chance against almost 40% of the Soviet armoured vehicles in 1944 (T-70, SU-76, BA-64, etc.) and it was able to evade heavier tanks due to its excellent maneuverability and small size.

Several Toldi tanks were captured by the USSR late in the war, two of them were transported to Kubinka for testing and are still preserved there.

A few Toldis were captured by the Romanians after Romania switched sides following the 1944 coup d'état. Their fate is unknown.

== Survivors ==
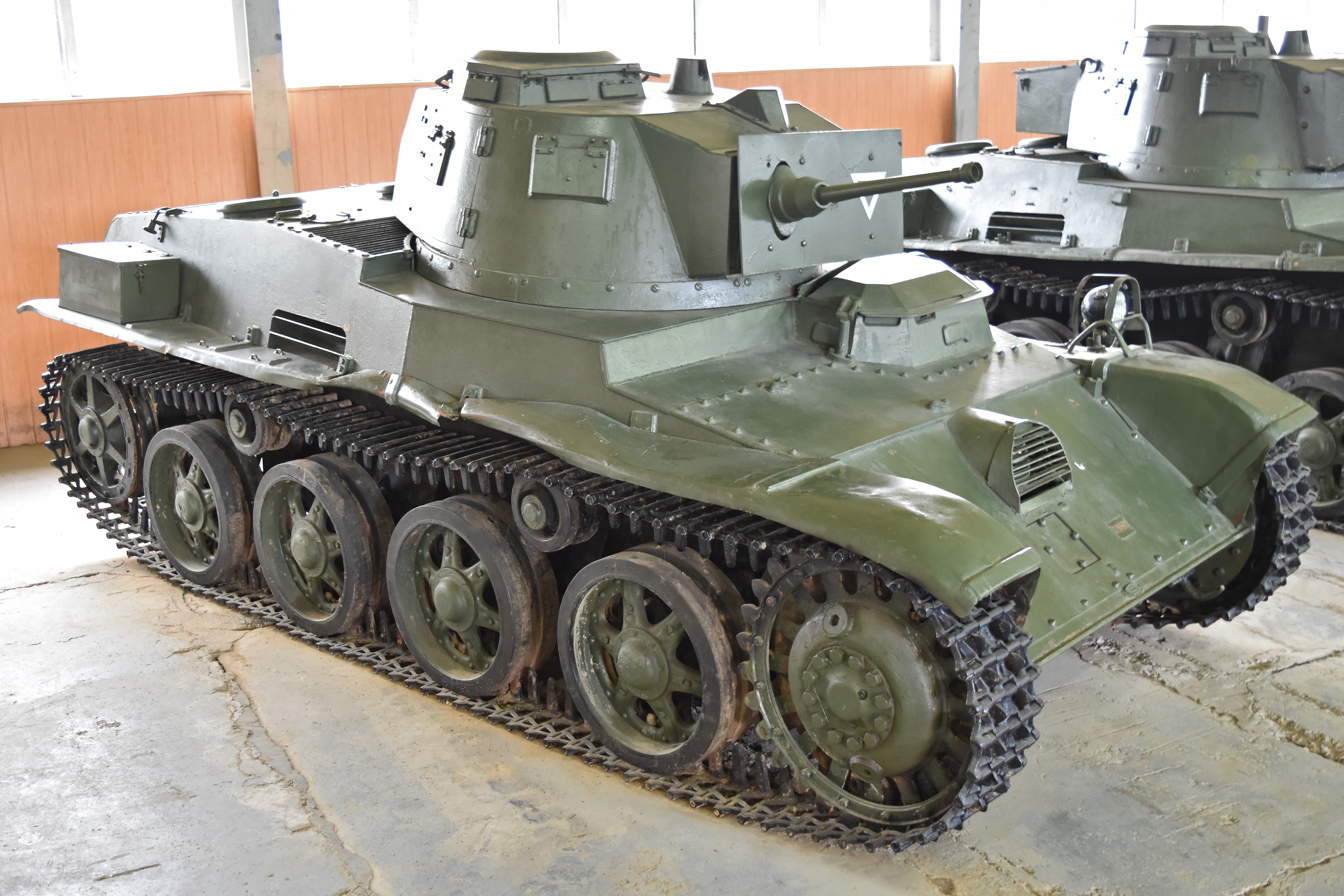
The only surviving 38M Toldi I in Kubinka Tank Museum – it has been damaged and modified. The Toldi IIA can be seen in the background.

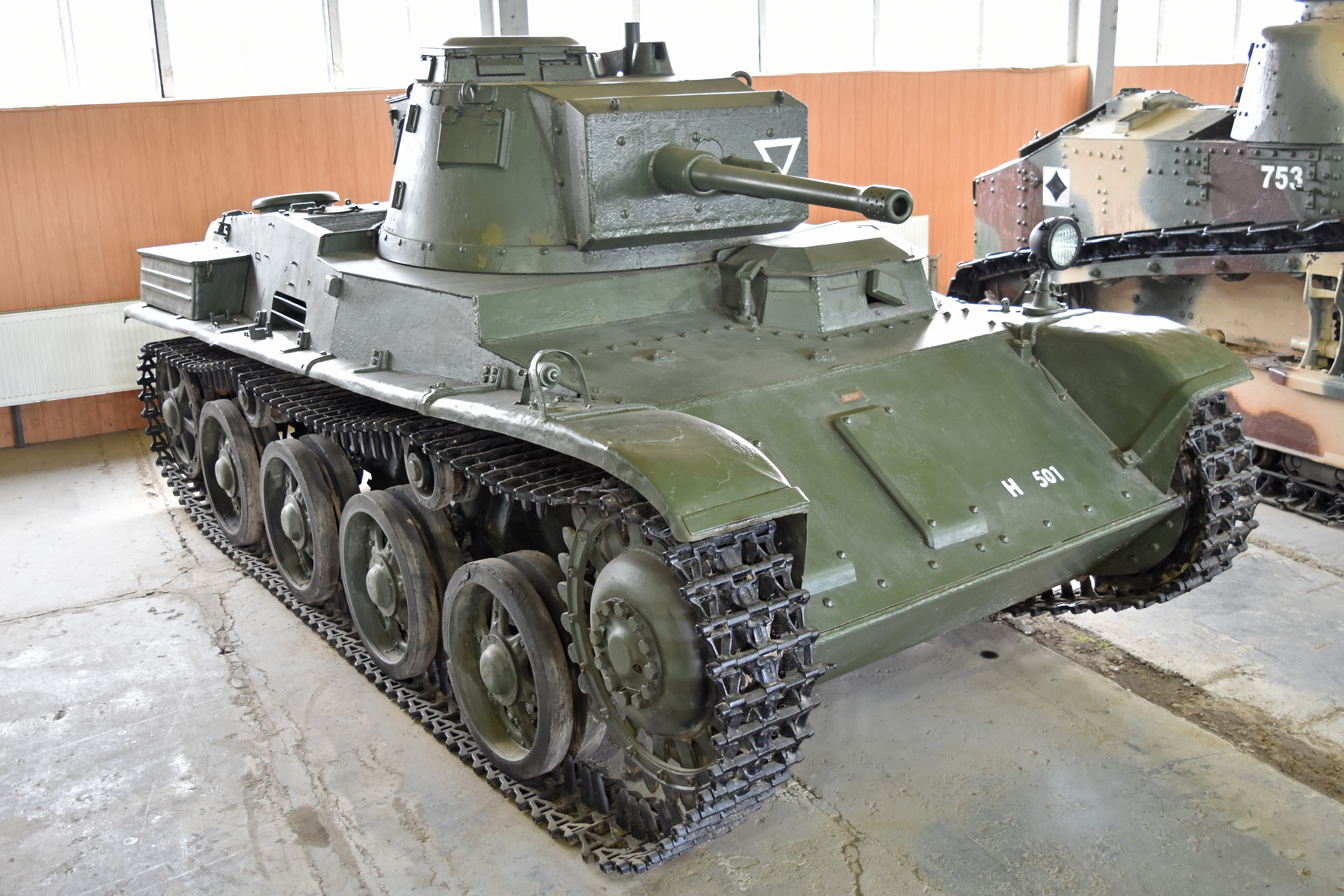
The only surviving Toldi IIA (H501) in Kubinka Tank Museum.

Two Toldi tanks (one Toldi I and one Toldi IIA) are preserved on display at the Kubinka Tank Museum in Moscow, Russia. It can be seen that on the surviving 38M Toldi I the gun mantlet, guns, lights and rails have been modified or removed, and the right fender is damaged.

== Gallery ==
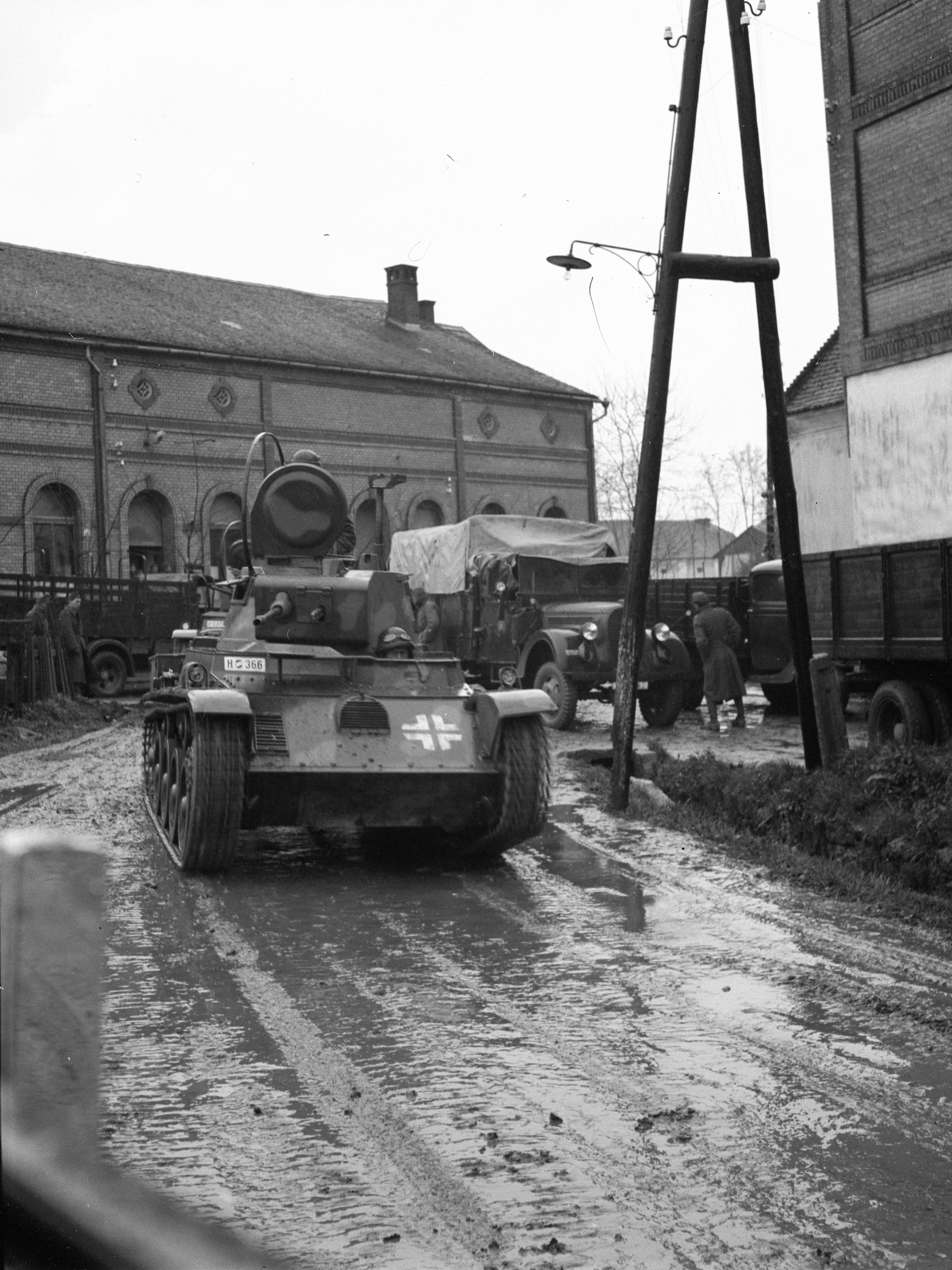
A 38M Toldi I in Villány, Hungary, 1941

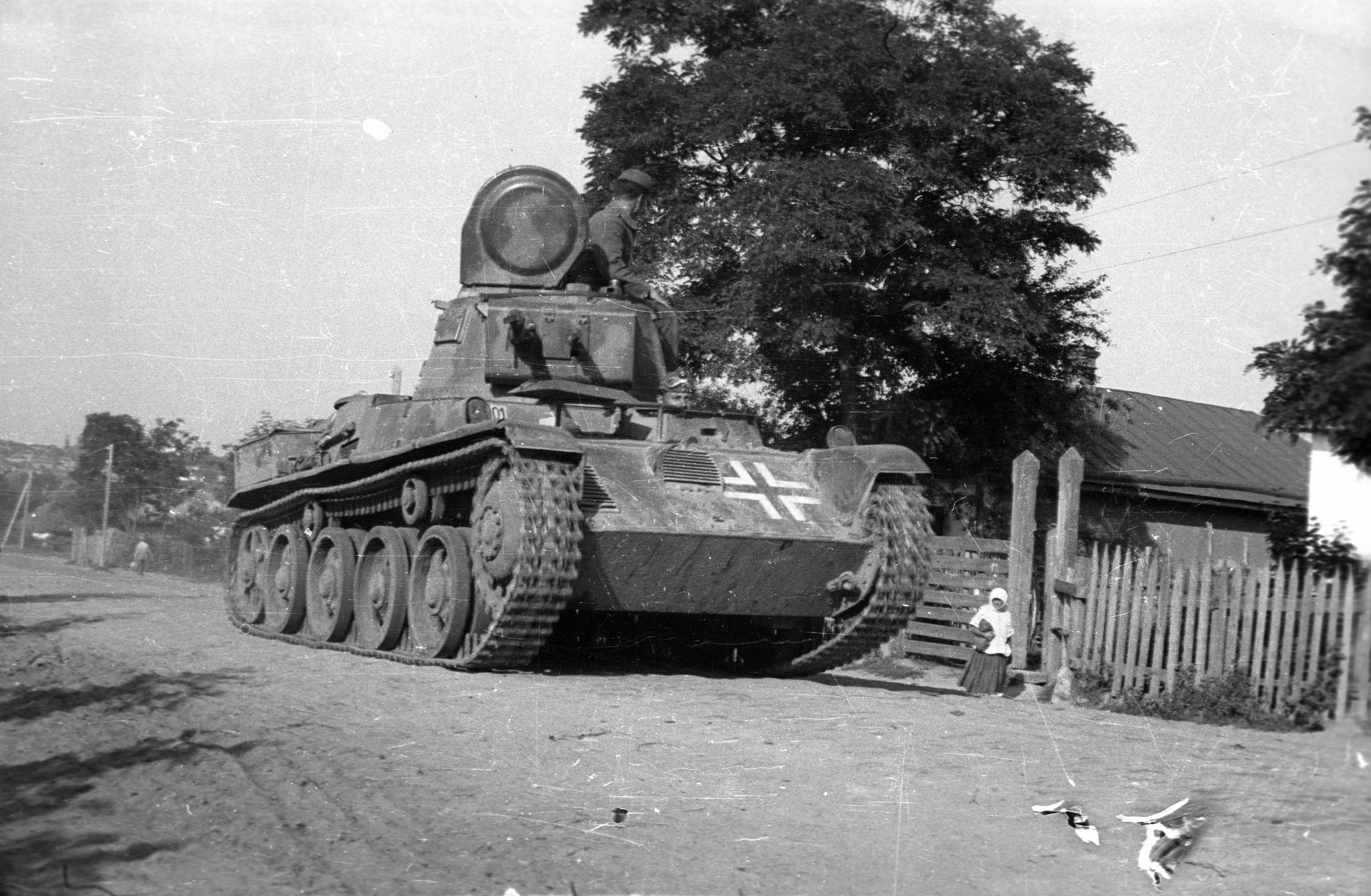
A Toldi I in 1941

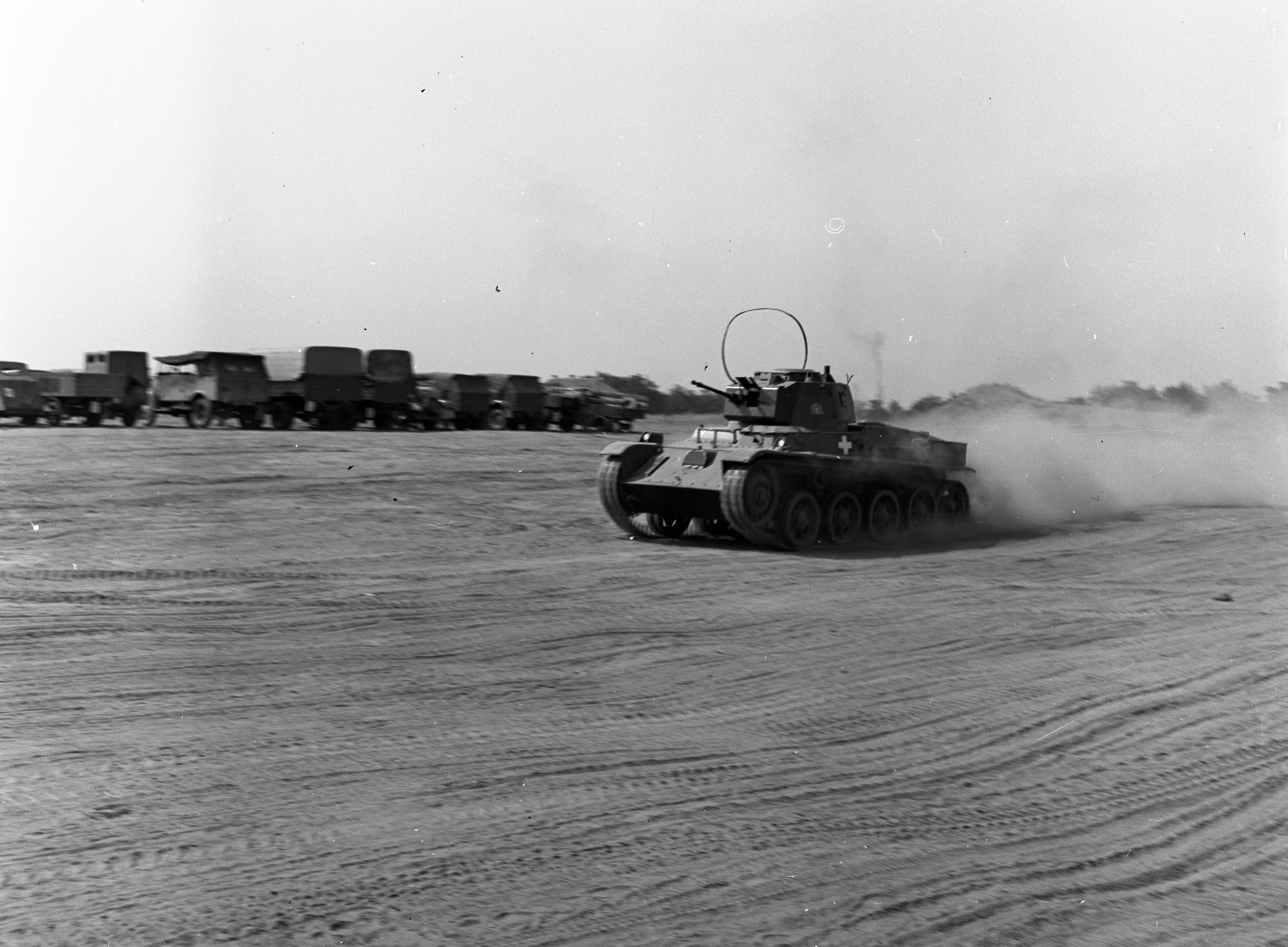
A 38M Toldi I on the move, 1943

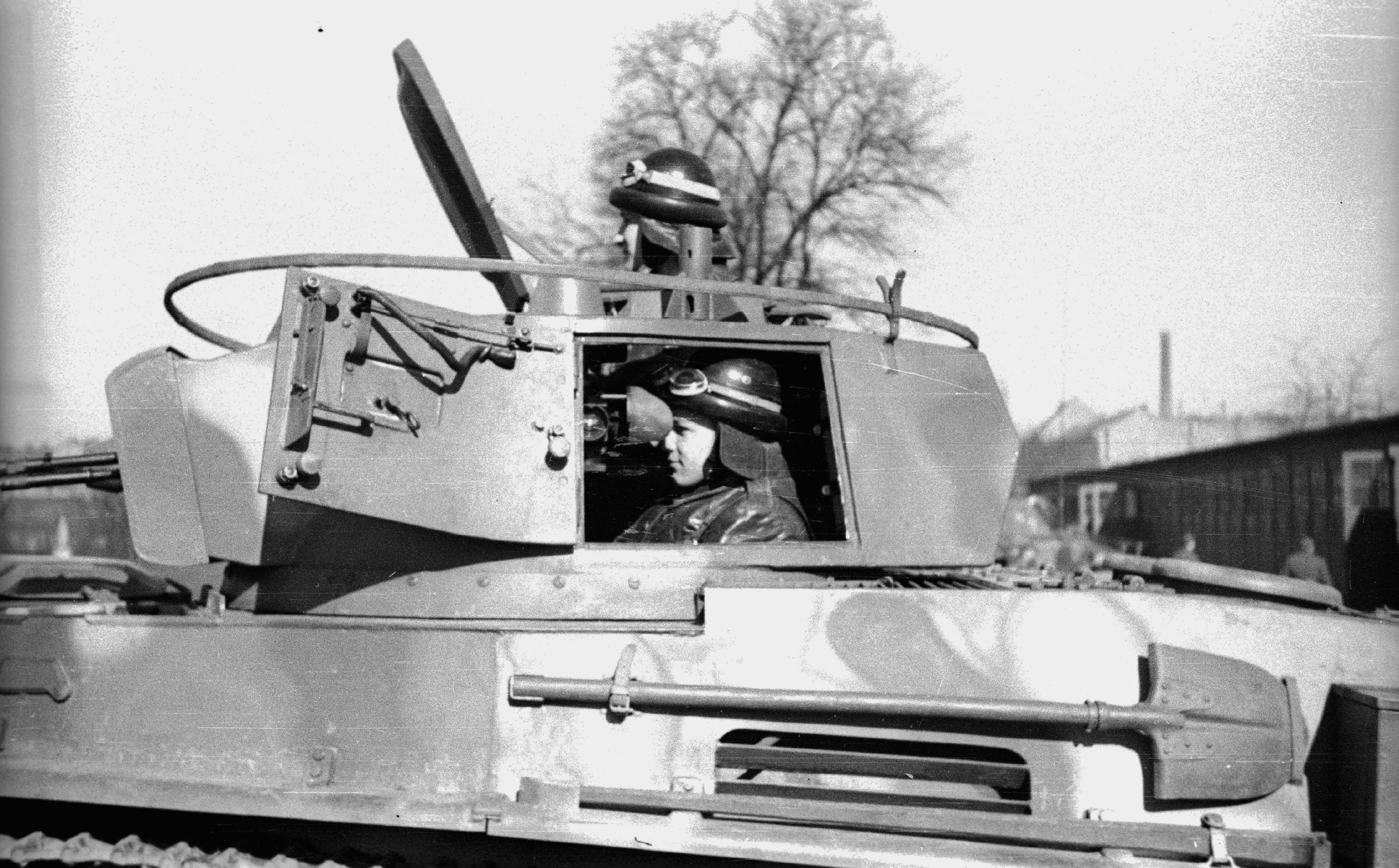
38M Toldi I with radio antenna folded down and hatches open, Budapest, Hungary, 1940

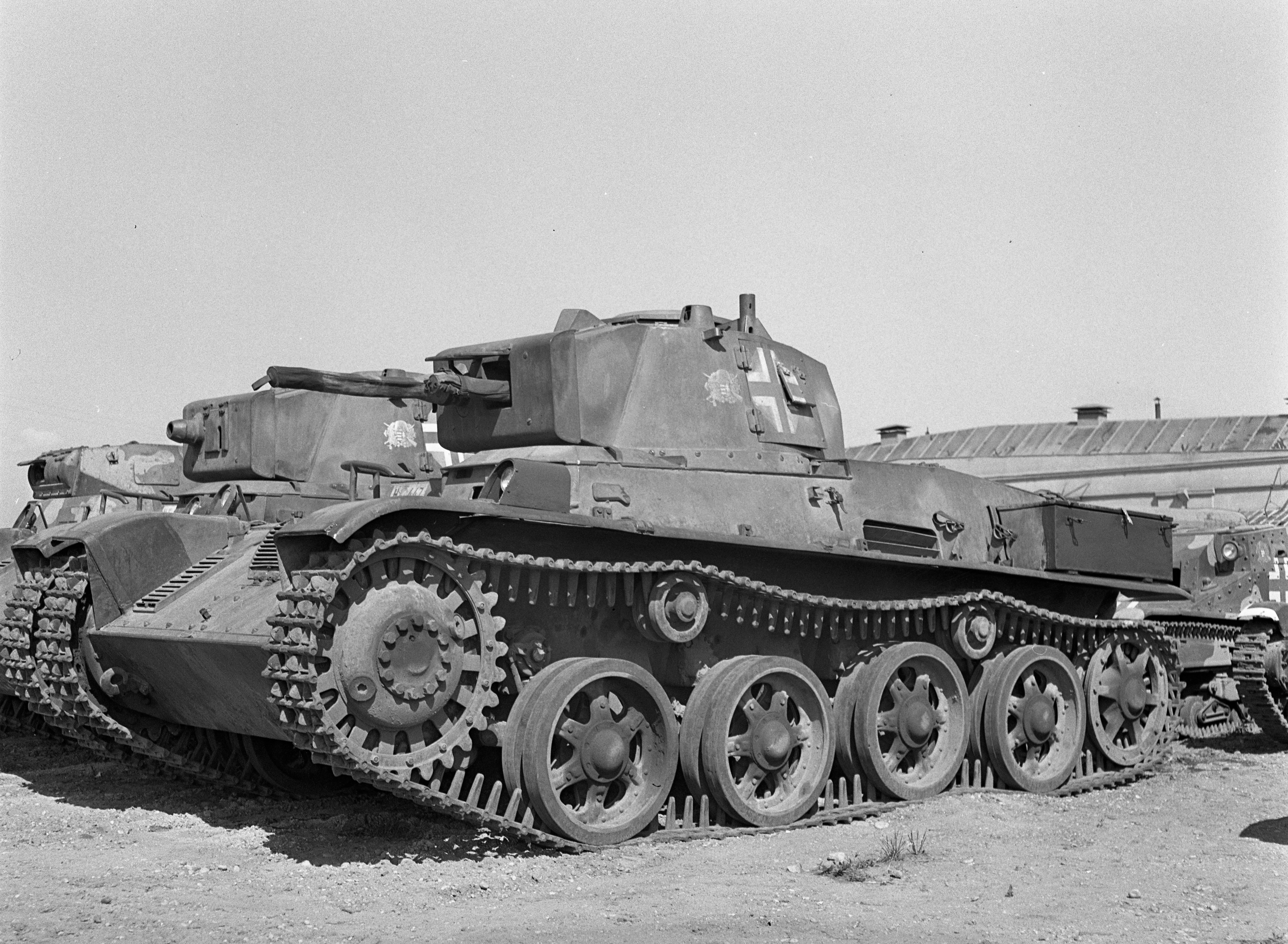
A Toldi tank in Budapest, Hungary, 1943

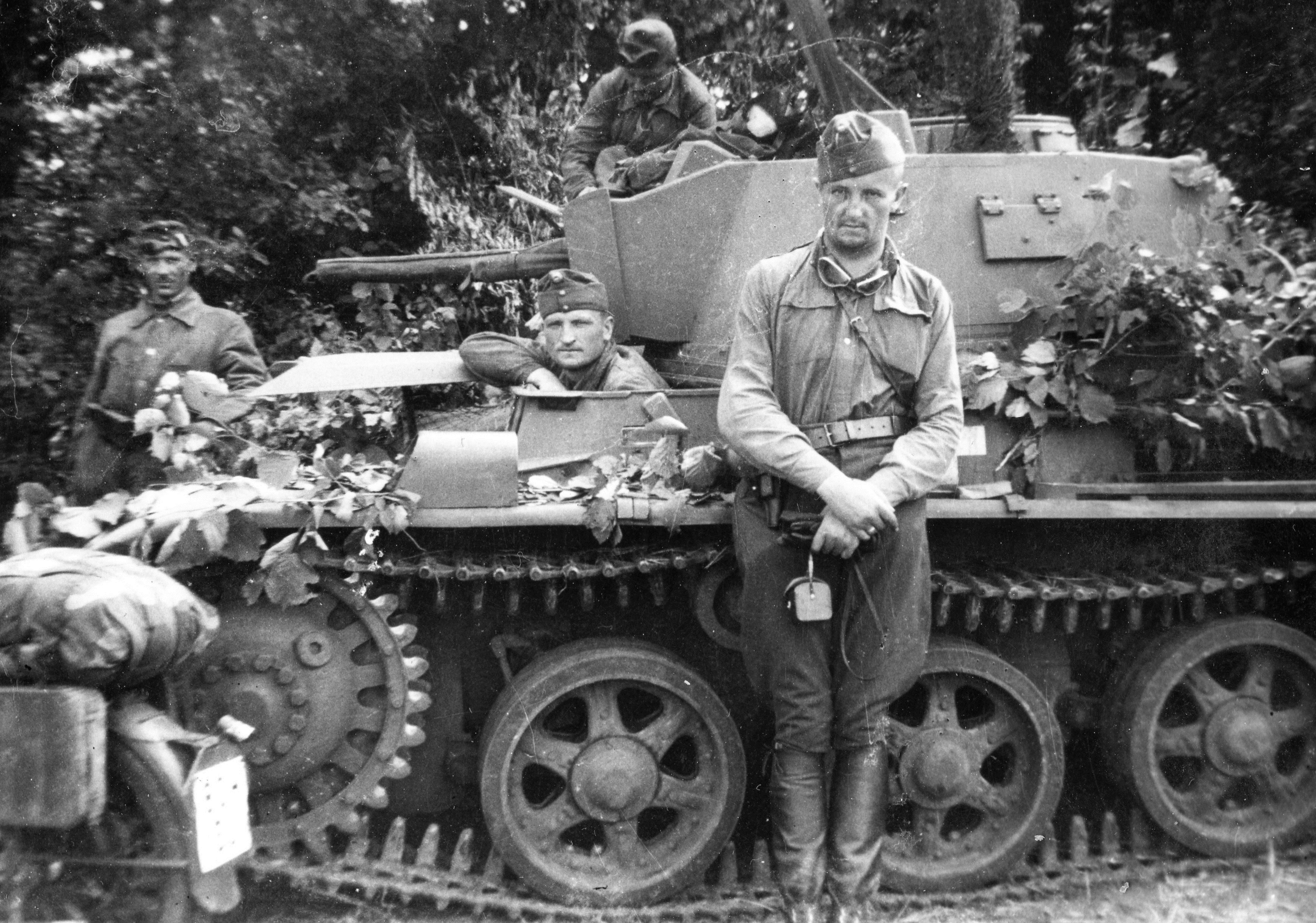
Toldi II with its crew, 1942

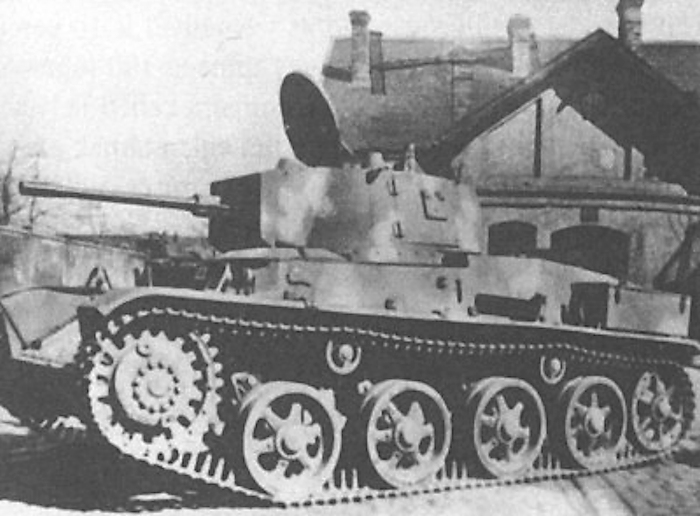
Toldi IIA prototype. It has many differences with production Toldi IIAs.

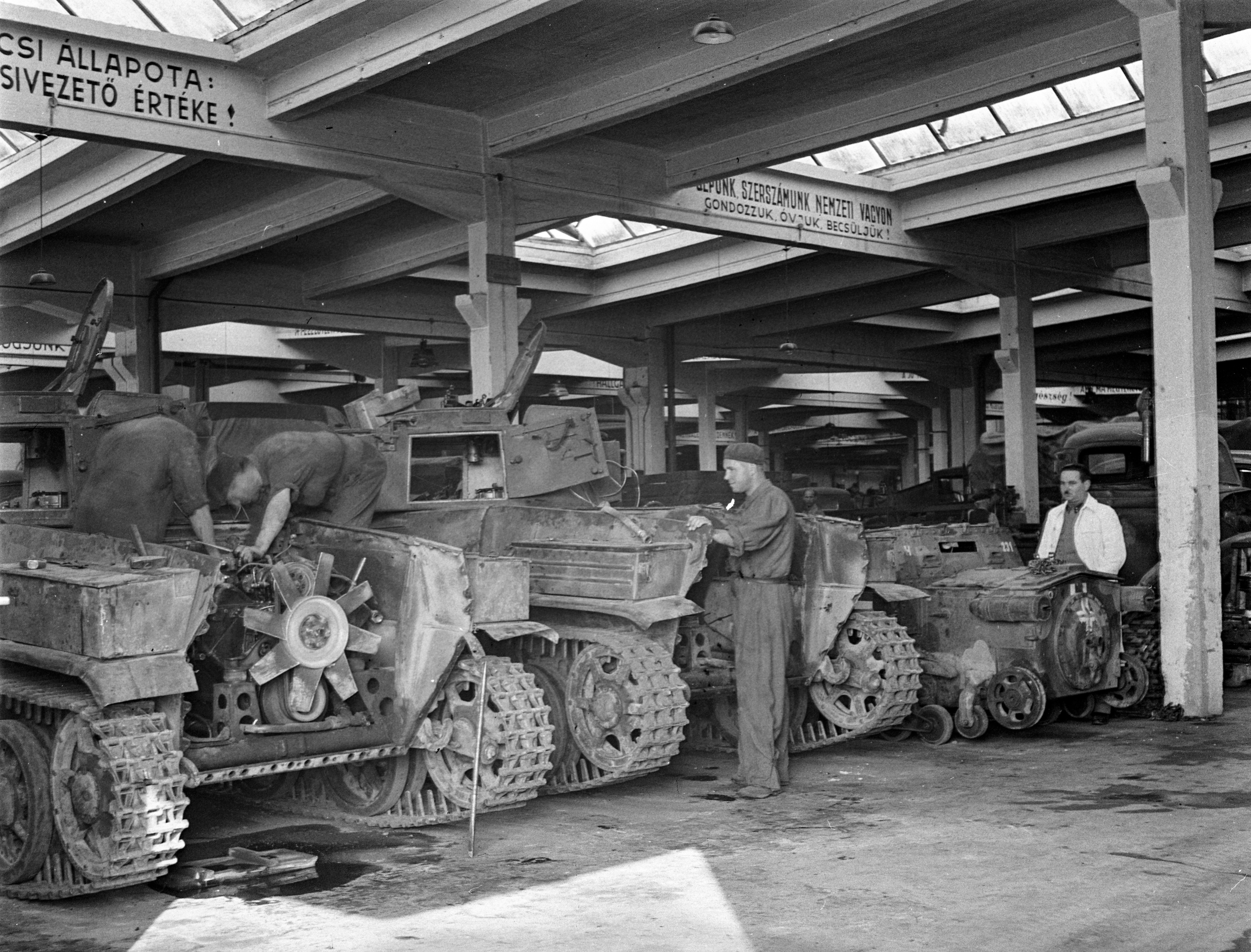
Toldi tanks undergoing maintenance in Hungary, 1943
