= 44M Buzogányvető =

Hungarian WW2 anti-tank rocket system

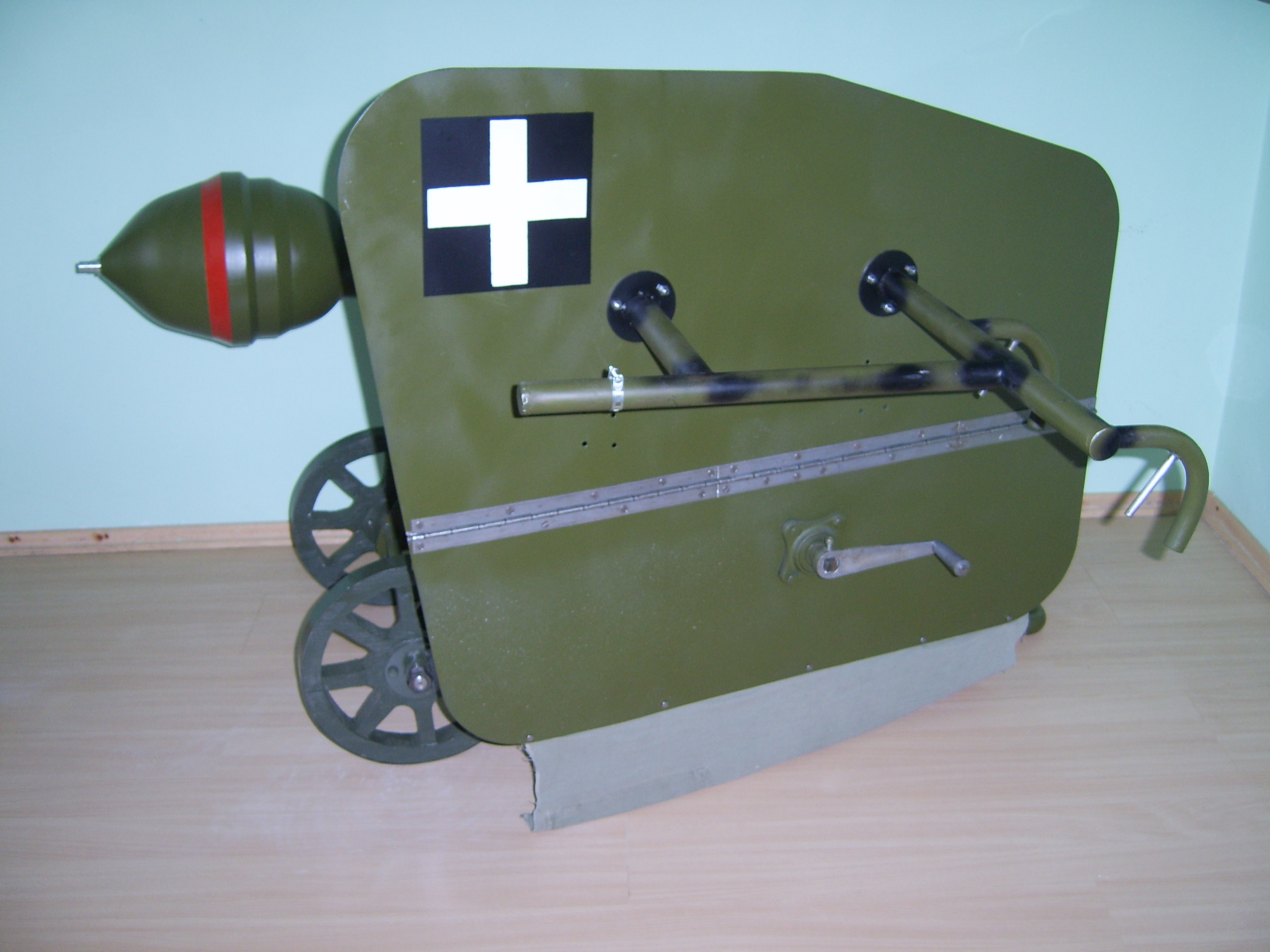
- A replica 44M Buzogányvető on a wheeled mount
- Type: Anti-tank rocket
- Place of origin: Hungary

Service history
- In service: 1944–1945
- Used by: Royal Hungarian Army
- Wars: World War II

Production history
- Designer: Hungarian Institute of Military Science (HTI)
- Designed: 1942
- Manufacturer: Weiss Manfréd
- Produced: 1944
- No. built: 600-700 rocket systems
- Variants: HEAT (high-explosive anti-tank); HE (high-explosive)

Specifications
- Diameter: 215 mm (8.5 in)
- Crew: 3
- Effective firing range: 500–1,200 m (550–1,310 yd) m
- Maximum firing range: 2,000 m (2,200 yd)
- Warhead: 4.2 kg (9.3 lb) HEAT
- Detonation mechanism: contact
- Engine: solid-fuel rocket
- Maximum speed: 56 m/s (180 ft/s)
- Launch platform: Tripod mount, wheeled machine gun mount, truck, horse carriage, tank,

The 44M "Buzogányvető" Páncéltörő Rakéta (English: Anti-Tank Rocket System Model 1944 "Mace Thrower") was an unguided anti-tank rocket designed in Hungary for use against Soviet heavy tanks and infantry during World War II. It was also known as the "Szálasi-röppentyű" (röppentyű is an archaic word for artillery rockets).

== Development ==
In 1942, the Haditechnikai Intézet or "Institute of Military Technology" began work to develop a cheap and easy to produce weapon capable of destroying Soviet heavy tanks after Nazi Germany was unwilling to share technology related to their work on an experimental wire-guided missile.

The first prototype was completed in the spring of 1944 and underwent testing in the military camp of Esztergom. After recommendations from troops who tested the weapon were taken into account, it was approved for production in the summer of 1944.

There was also German interest in the development. The Waffenamt received, on request from its director General Emil Leeb, several samples of the weapon.

== Production ==
Mass production started in the summer of 1944 at the steel pipe factory of the Weiss Manfréd Company, where Chief Engineer Magasházi led production. After complaints were made by soldiers who tested the weapon relating to the experimental tripod the weapon was mounted on limiting maneuverability, production of the tripod was cancelled. Hungary, however, lacked the industrial capability at the time to manufacture a brand-new mount for the weapon. Due to this, captured wheeled mounts were used instead, mainly "Sokolov mounts" from captured Maxim M1910 and SG-43 Goryunov machine guns, as Hungarian forces had captured many of these mounts during the duration of the war.

Production of the weapon continued even as the Soviet invasion of Hungary began, until Soviet troops reached the city home to itsfactory. Sources conflict as to whether the factory was destroyed or captured by Soviet forces on 20 December 1944, but either way production was halted entirely, and never resumed. During the time of production 600 to 700 units were produced

== Description ==
The weapon consisted of two launch tubes mounted on either a captured Maxim M1910 or SG-43 Goryunov machine gun mount. A large, thin metal shield separated the firing mechanism of the weapon from the launch tubes in order to protect the gunner from the back blast of the weapon's initial propulsion charge. The gun used a machine gun sight to aim and had two paddle-like triggers on the bar-like handholds the gunner used to aim the weapon.

== Operation ==
The crew consisted of three men, a single gunner and two loaders.

The gunner aimed the weapon using the mounted sight to the left of the launch tubes and once the gunner had acquired the target and ranged the weapon correctly, he pulled one of the handle-like triggers on the gunner's hand holds. This ignited the initial charge that pushed the rocket out of the firing tube, propelling it away from the launcher. Approximately 2 seconds after the rocket was launched from the launch tube the rocket motor ignited and propelled the rocket to target.

== Combat use ==
The 44M Buzogányvető was first used to arm Hungarian paratroopers. Of the 600-700 rocket systems produced, the vast majority were used during the Soviet Army's encirclement and eventual capture of the city of Budapest, colloquially referred to as the Siege of Budapest.

Not included in the siege was a rocket unit under the command of Major-General Árpád Denk-Doroszlay, consisting of one battery with 12 double launchers mounted on horse drawn carriages, one battery with 12 double launchers mounted on trucks, and one battery composed of 5 tanks with two launch tubes each. There also was a battery consisting of 6 launchers for 44M Lidérc unguided air-to-air rockets repurposed for ground-to-ground use. Because of the Soviet advance, Denk-Doroszlay requested to move his unit to Germany to continue trials and training in order to form more batteries.

It seems that this plan was carried out, as there exists a photograph taken by an American soldier in April/May 1945, likely in Bavaria, that shows a Toldi II (B20) Tank (specifically the Toldi II tank with license plate "H-389") being converted to use this weapon. The tank is modified in many ways including the removal of the main gun (20mm Solothurn) and the engine cover being fixed into an open position to create the necessary flat area to mount the weapon. Based on the fact that the engine cover is fixed into an open position, something dangerous to do in a combat situation, it can be confidently assumed that this is not a properly manufactured variant of the tank, but rather a field conversion.

== Ammunition ==
The ammunition fired from this weapon was a 100 mm spin-stabilized rocket. This rocket was ignited through the firing of a blank 8mm Mauser bullet, which ignited a charge that propelled the weapon out of the tube it was housed in. Approximately two seconds after launch the rocket engine ignited and propelled the rocket to its target. Detonation of the rocket was caused after contact with a solid surface. Two different rockets were produced for this weapon.

"Buzogány" HEAT Rocket: The "Mace" type rocket flew at a speed of 200 km/h (120 mph) and contained a 4.2 kg (9.3 lb) shaped charge warhead. This rocket was capable of penetrating up to 300 mm (12 in) of tank armor and concrete. The rocket had an effective range anywhere from 500 m (1,600 ft) up to 1,200 m (3,900 ft). Theoretically the weapon could be fired at and reach a target from up to 2,000 m (6,600 ft) in ideal circumstances, however the rocket was very inaccurate at this range.

"Zápor" HE Rocket: The "Downpour" or "Rainfall" type rocket was a high explosive rocket designed for use in this weapon. Little information can be found about this rocket other than its name and its use as an anti-infantry rocket.

== See also ==
- 44M Lidérc (WWII Hungarian acoustic proximity fused air-to-air rocket)
- Anti-tank warfare
- Anti-tank missile
- Anti-tank gun
- List of anti-tank missiles
- List of military rockets
- List of anti-tank guns
- Shaped charge
