= 44M Lidérc =

Hungarian acoustic proximity fused air-to-air rocket of World War II

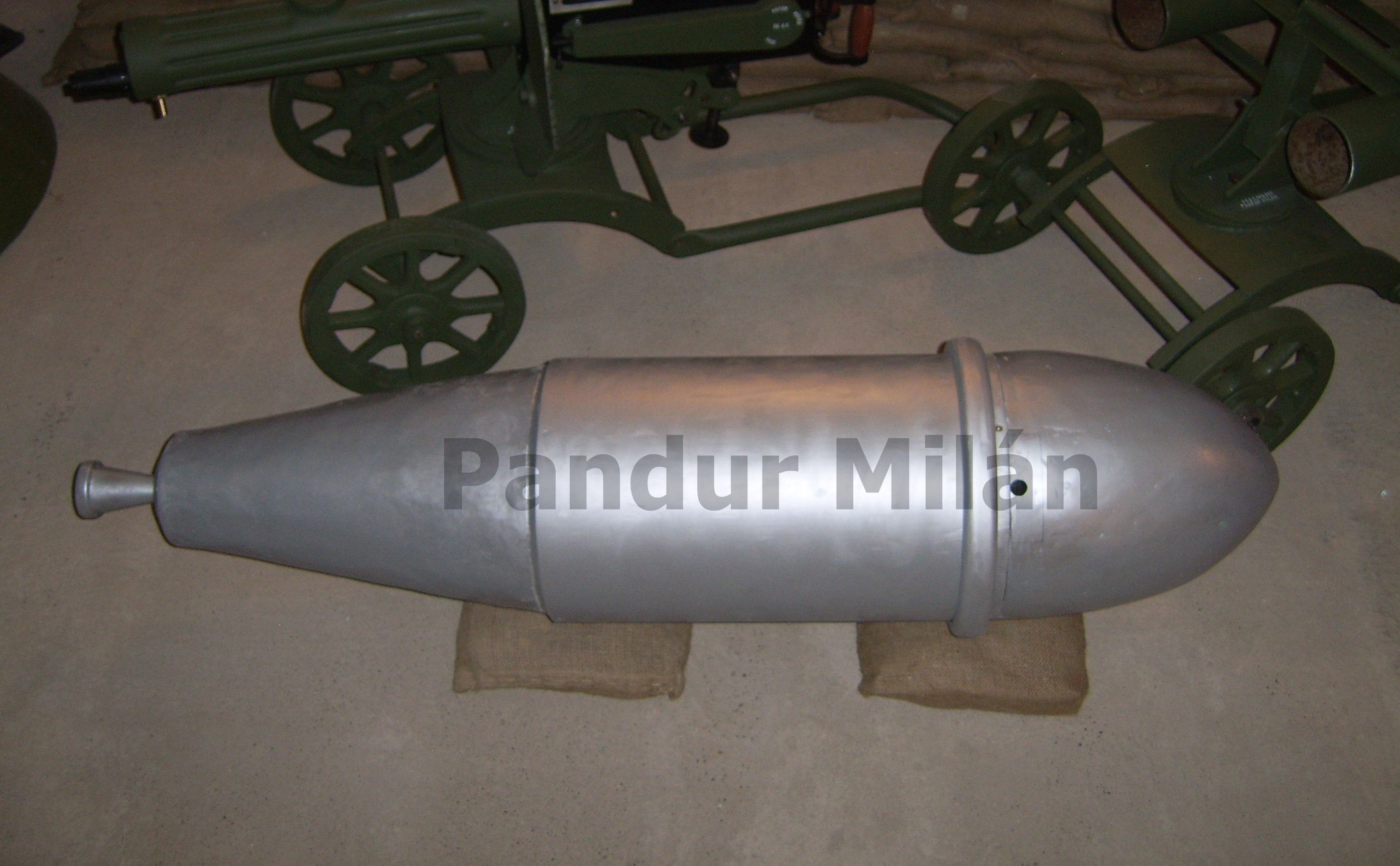
- A replica 44M Lidérc air-to-air rocket
- Type: Acoustic proximity fused air-to-air rocket
- Place of origin: Hungary

Service history
- Used by: Hungary
- Wars: World War II

Production history
- Manufacturer: Weiss Manfréd; DIMÁVAG
- No. built: A few hundred (without acoustic proximity fuses)

Specifications
- Engine: solid fuel rocket
- Launch platform: Me 210 Ca-1 heavy fighter aircraft

The 44M Lidérc (Hungarian: lidérc) was an experimental air-to-air rocket developed in Hungary during World War II. It had an acoustic proximity fuse invented by Károly Pulváry (Technological University of Budapest). The acoustic device was a highly advanced piece of technology in 1944, and the research of necessary electronics was quite a complex project. The sensor consisted of a super-sensitive microphone and a squelch principle circuit with two electron tube amplifiers.

External image
- Cutaway plan of the Lidérc on tortenelem.444.hu

The fuse worked excellently with the artificial American bomber-engine sounds in the Aerotechnical Institute's wind tunnel. In combat against a bomber formation, every Me 210 Ca-1 destroyer-aircraft (Hungarian: romboló, German: Zerstörer) taking part in an attack would have launched 2-4 Lidérc rockets into a bomber group, which was expected to cause great damage and significantly impact the morale of bomber crews. The main goal was to scatter bomber formations to disrupt their attacks, rather than destroying every aircraft, thus protecting civilians from terror-bombings.

Several hundred rockets were produced, but the Allied bombing raids made it impossible to finish the acoustic system. The weapon was produced in Csepel at Weiss Manfréd Works, but due to the bombing raids on the factory, DIMÁVAG continued it. The Hungarian troops used them in the defensive operations of Csepel Island, Érd, and later in Lake Velence as anti-personnel incendiary rocket artillery (like the Nebelwerfer) against Soviet infantry.

There also was German interest in the weapon. It was demonstrated to the Plenipotentiary General of the Wehrmacht in Hungary, Hans von Greiffenberg, and a sample of the acoustic proximity fuse was handed over to Oberst Josef Hübner, Chief of Staff of the Commanding General of the Luftwaffe in Hungary.

== See also ==
- 44M Buzogányvető (Hungarian heavy anti-tank rocket)

=== Similar air-to-air rockets ===
- Mk 4 (FFAR) "Mighty Mouse"
- R4M Orkan
- RS-82
- Zuni (FFAR)
