= Messerschmitt Me 210 =

German heavy fighter

Me 210
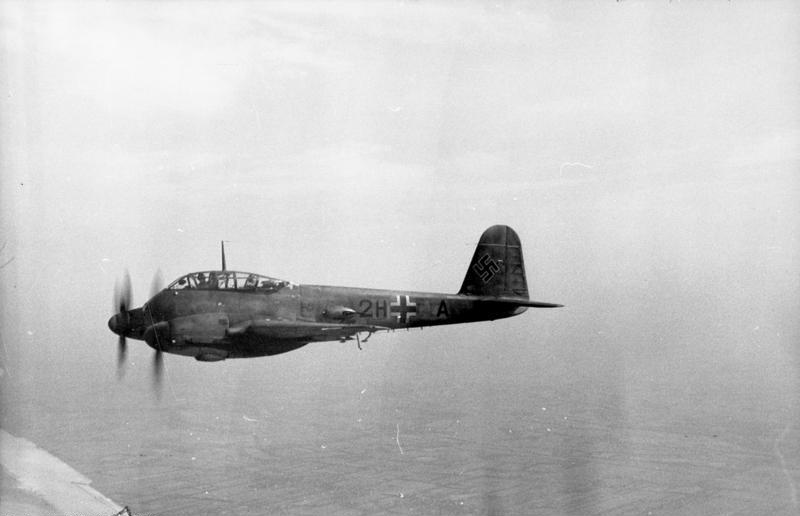
- A Luftwaffe Me 210 A-1 of the Versuchsstaffel 210 test squadron, over France in 1942

General information
- Type: Heavy fighter, ground-attack aircraft, fighter-bomber, dive bomber
- Manufacturer: Messerschmitt
- Primary users: Luftwaffe Royal Hungarian Air Force
- Number built: 90 Me 210A in Germany; 267 Me 210Ca-1 in Hungary

History
- Introduction date: 1942
- First flight: 2 September 1939
- Retired: 1945
- Developed from: Messerschmitt Bf 110
- Variant: Messerschmitt Me 410 Hornisse

The Messerschmitt Me 210 was a German heavy fighter and ground-attack aircraft of World War II. Design started before the war, as a replacement for the Bf 110. The first examples were ready in 1939, but they proved to have unacceptably poor flight characteristics due to serious wing planform and fuselage design flaws. A large-scale operational testing program throughout 1941 and early 1942 did not cure the type's problems. The design entered limited service in 1942, but was soon replaced by the Messerschmitt Me 410 Hornisse, a further development of the Me 210. The failure of the Me 210's development program meant the Luftwaffe was forced to continue operating the Bf 110 after it had become outdated, despite mounting losses.

== Design and development ==
Messerschmitt designers had started working on an upgrade of the Bf 110 in 1937, before the production version of the Bf 110 had even flown. In late 1938, the Bf 110 was just entering service, and the RLM started looking ahead to its eventual replacement. Messerschmitt sent in their modified Bf 110 design as the Me 210, and Arado responded with their all-new Ar 240.

The Me 210 was a considerable departure from the 110, but used many of the same parts. The main differences were a modified nose area that was much shorter and located over the center of gravity, an internal bomb bay, an all-new wing designed for higher cruise speeds and a highly advanced remote-control defensive armament system that gave the gunner a far wider field of fire. On paper, the Me 210's performance was impressive: It could reach 620 km/h (390 mph) on two 1,350 PS (1,330 hp, 990 kW) Daimler-Benz DB 601F engines, making it about 80 km/h (50 mph) faster than the Bf 110, and nearly as fast as single-engine fighters of that era.

The Me 210's main landing gear followed some of the design philosophies that had resulted from the main change in the earlier Ju 88's main landing gear design, where each main gear had a single gear strut that twisted through 90° during retraction, to bring the main gear wheel resting atop the lower end of the main strut when retracted rearwards into the wing. Unlike the Ju 88, however, the Me 210's main gear wheels were inboard of the main gear struts when fully extended, whereas the Ju 88's were outboard of the struts.

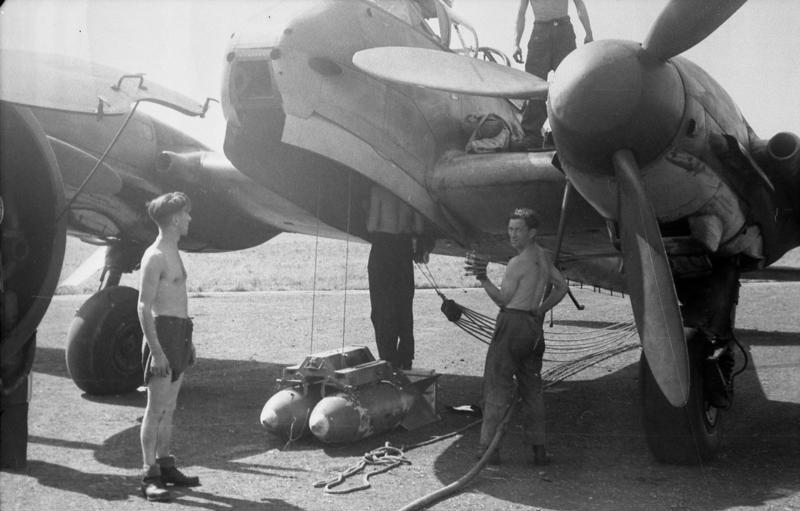
The Me 210 featured a bomb bay, unlike its predecessor, the Bf 110

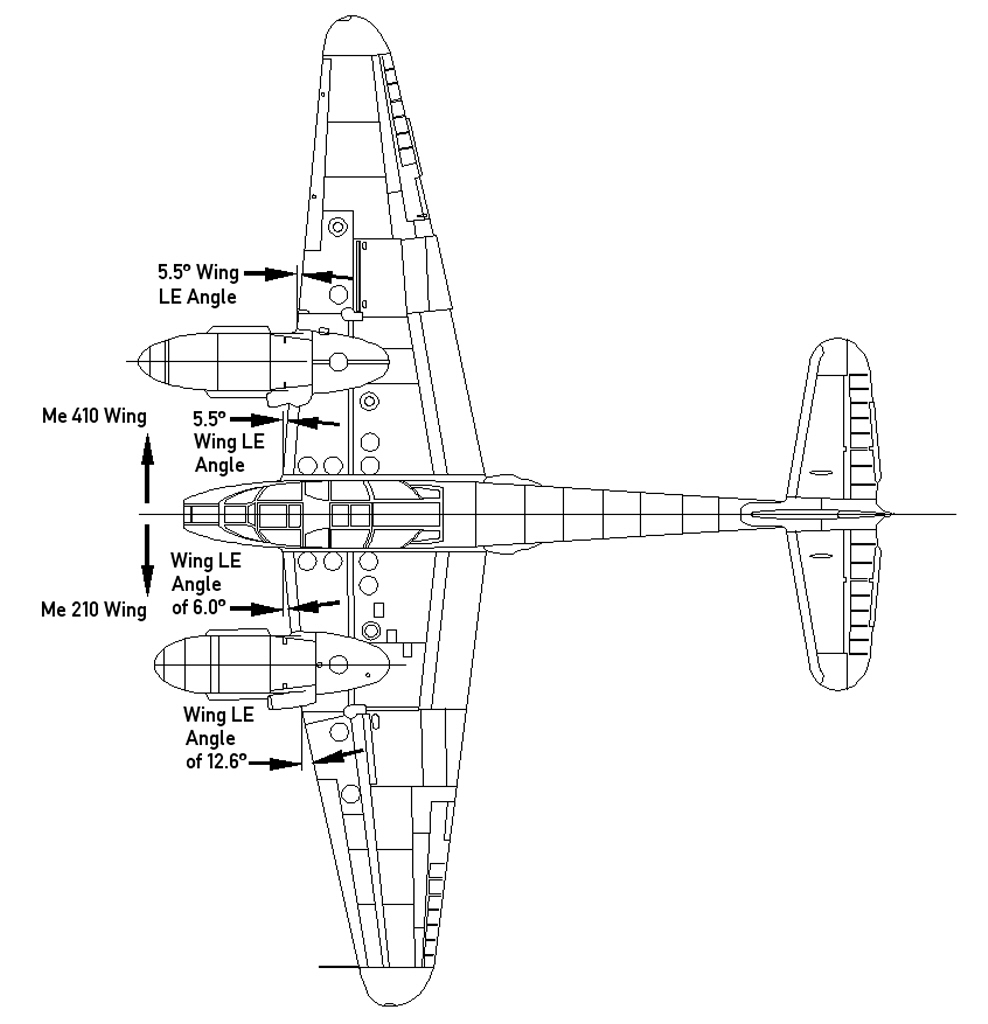
Comparison of the wing planforms of the Me 210 and its successor, the Me 410 Hornisse.

The Bf 110 carried its ordnance externally beneath the wings and fuselage, but this created drag; the Me 210 avoided this problem by housing the bombs in an enclosed bomb bay, in the nose of the aircraft. The Me 210 could carry up to two 500 kg (1,100 lb) bombs. The Me 210 had dive brakes fitted on the tops of the wings, and a Stuvi 5B bombsight ("Stuvi"-Sturzkampfvisier, dive-bombing sight) in the nose, for shallow-angle dive bombing. In the fighter role, the bomb bay was fitted with four 20 mm cannon.

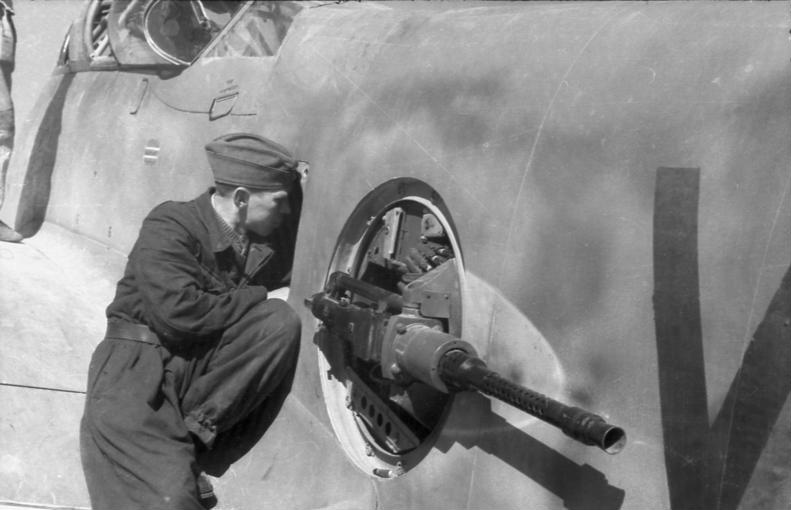
The FDSL 131 remote gun turret of an Me 210 being maintained

For defence, the Me 210's rear gunner was armed with two 13 mm (.51 in) MG 131 machine guns. Each of these was fitted into half-teardrop-shaped Ferngerichtete Drehringseitenlafette FDSL 131/1B turrets mounted on each side of the aircraft, and was remote-controlled from the gunner's position in the rear of the glazed cockpit area with a unique gun-aiming setup. This unit had a pivoting handgun-style grip, trigger and gunsight at its center, to aim the guns vertically—with both turrets elevating and depressing together when operated - and horizontally, in pivoting each gun separately, outward away from the fuselage side when aimed to one side or the other. The rear of the cockpit canopy's lower side glazing panels were bulged out to allow the gunner to see in almost any rearward-facing direction. The guns were electrically fired, and an electrical contact breaker acted as a form of "interrupter" as used on many forms of multi-engined, turret-armed WW II aircraft, preventing the gunner from shooting off the Me 210's tailplane.

An order for 1,000 Me 210s was placed before the prototype had flown. In time, this would prove to be a major error. The first prototype flew with DB 601B engines in September 1939, and was considered unsafe by test pilots. Stability was bad in turns, and it tended to oscillate, even while flying level. At first, the designers concentrated on the twin-rudder arrangement that had been taken from the 110, and replaced it with a new and much larger single vertical stabilizer. This had almost no effect, and the plane continued to "snake". The Me 210 also suffered from terrible stalls. With the nose up or in a turn, the stalls whipped into spins when the automatic leading-edge slats opened. The second prototype, Me 210 V2, was lost this way in September 1940, when the pilot could not get out of the resulting spin and had to abandon the aircraft. The chief test pilot commented that the Me 210 had "all the least desirable attributes an aeroplane could possess." It took 16 prototypes and 94 preproduction examples to try to resolve the many problems. Nevertheless, the RLM was desperate to replace the Bf 110s currently in service, and ordered full production in early 1941. The type exhibited grossly inadequate handling characteristics, and as a result, several elements of the airframe were redesigned, including lengthening the rear section of the fuselage by 92 cm (36-1/4 inches), designated as lang ("long"). The Me 210C was built with DB 605 engines, as well as incorporating the changes to the airframe. The Hungarian authorities were satisfied with the Me 210C in its current state, and purchased a production license for the type, to fill the role of the Varga RMI-1 X/H, designated Me 210Ca (a = ausländisch or 'foreign') as well as for its DB 605 engines. Several airframes were also purchased, to be completed in Hungarian factories for practice while the assembly lines were set up. Production started in the Dunai Repülőgépgyár Rt. (Danubian Aircraft Plant) as the Me 210Ca with the DB 605B engine, under an agreement where the Luftwaffe received two of every three produced.

The Me 210 was eventually developed into the Messerschmitt Me 410, with DB 603 engines.

== Operational history ==
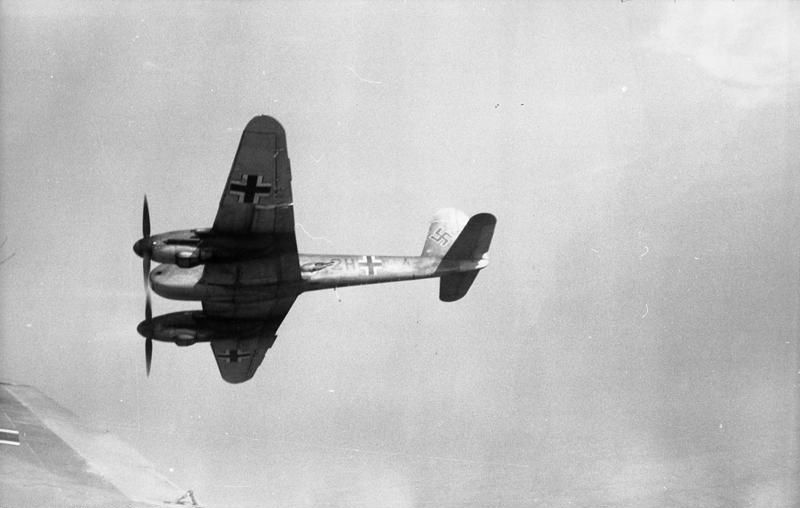
A Me 210 flying over France, 1942

Deliveries to frontline units started in April 1942 and the plane proved to be even less popular with pilots. Production was stopped at the month's end by which time only 90 had been delivered. Another 320 partially completed airframes were placed in storage. In its place, the Bf 110 was put back into production. Although the Bf 110 was now equipped with the newer DB 605B engines and greater firepower, it was still an outdated design.

The Luftwaffe started receiving their Hungarian-built planes in April 1943, and the Hungarians in 1944; when they entered service they were more than satisfied with them. Production ended in March 1944, when the factory switched over to produce the Bf 109G. By that time, a total of 267 Me 210C had been built, 108 of which had been given to the Luftwaffe. The Me 210s of the Luftwaffe operated mostly in Tunisia and Sardinia and were quickly replaced by the Me 410.

== Variants ==
Me 210 A-0
Pre-production aircraft.
Me 210 A-1
Two-seat twin-engined fighter-bomber and heavy fighter.
Me 210 A-2
Two-seat twin-engined dive bomber and heavy fighter.
Me 210C
Improved airframe, DB 605 engines.
Me 210 Ca-1
Hungarian-licensed production version of the Me 210C with Daimler-Benz DB 605B engines.
Me 210 Ca-1 (40 mm)
Some Hungarian Me 210 Ca-1s were modified to carry a 40 mm Bofors autocannon in the lower fuselage in order to destroy Allied bombers. In addition, these aircraft could carry 152 mm rockets (modified version of the Hungarian copy of Nebelwerfer 41) for ground attack. The 44M Lidérc anti-bomber acoustic proximity fused air-to-air rocket was under development for the Me 210, but the project was not finished before the fall of Budapest.
Me 210D
Improved Me 210C, project only

== Operators ==
Germany

- Luftwaffe operated 90 German-built Me 210A and 108 Hungarian-built Me 210 Ca-1.
  - Eprobungsgruppe(A) 210 (first testing unit)
  - Versuchstaffel 210
  - 3./SKG 210
  - 16./KG 6
  - 1.,2.(F)/Aufkl.Gr.122 (Me/DAF 210C-1 user)
  - FAGr 122
  - Stab/AG 22
  - II., III.,7.,8.,9./ZG 1 'Wespe' (Me/DAF 210C-2 [Ca-1] user)
  - 10./ZG 26 (Me/DAF 210C-2 [Ca-1] user)
  - I., II./NJG 1
  - NJG 101

Hungary

- Royal Hungarian Air Force operated 179 Hungarian-built Me 210 Ca-1. The type was relatively successful against Soviet aircraft and the last Me 210s were destroyed by their crew at Parndorf (Hungarian: Pándorfalu) after the fall of Hungary in March 1945 due to the lack of fuel and spare parts.
  - 1° and 2° RKI Század "Villám" (Evaluation wing), RKI (Hungarian Aviation Institute)
  - 5/1.Légi Század "Bagoly" (NF Sqn)
  - 102.Gyorsbombázó, 102/1.Század "Sas"
  - 102.Gyorsbombázó, 102/2.Század "Tigris"
  - 102.Gyorsbombázó, 102/3.Század "Villám"

Japan

- Imperial Japanese Army Air Service
  - received one aircraft (Me 210A-2 W.Nr.2350) bought in Germany for tests and delivered by blockade runner. It was operated by the Testing unit of the First Tachikawa Air Army Arsenal.

== Specifications (Me 210Ca-1) ==
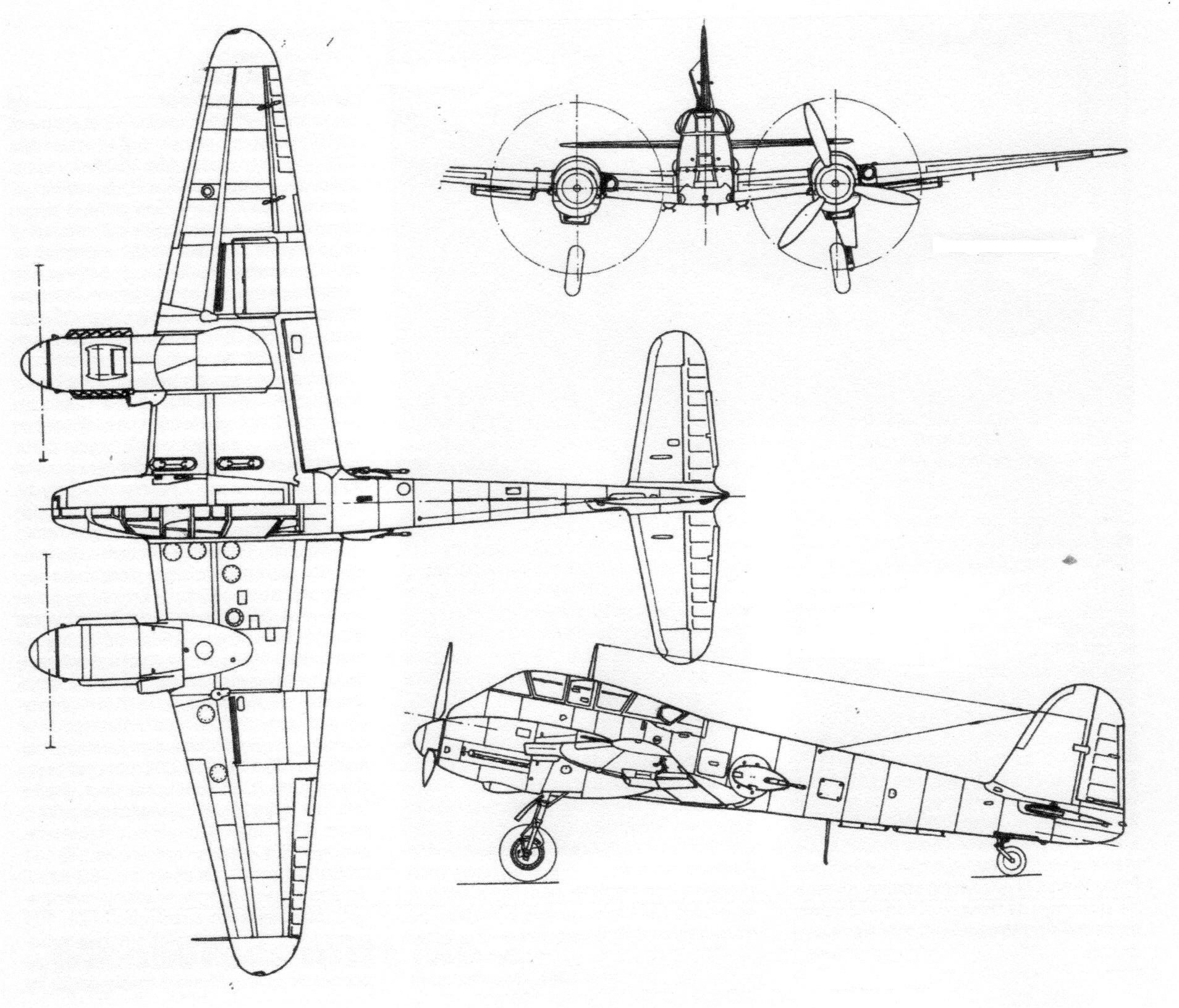
Me 210 3-view drawing

Data from Messerschmitt Me 210/410 in action, The warplanes of the Third Reich, German Combat Planes

General characteristics

- Crew: two
- Length: 12.2 m (40 ft 0 in)
- Wingspan: 16.3 m (53 ft 6 in)
- Height: 4.2 m (13 ft 9 in)
- Wing area: 36.2 m^{2} (390 sq ft)
- Airfoil: root: NACA 23018-636.5; tip: NACA 23010-636.5
- Empty weight: 7,069 kg (15,584 lb)
- Max takeoff weight: 9,705 kg (21,396 lb)
- Fuel capacity: 2,500 L (660 US gal; 550 imp gal) in four wing tanks
- Powerplant: 2 × Daimler-Benz DB 605B V-12 inverted liquid-cooled piston engine, 1,085 kW (1,455 hp) 1,475 PS each for take-off
- Propellers: 3-bladed VDM constant-speed propellers

Performance

- Maximum speed: 580 km/h (360 mph, 310 kn)
- Range: 1,818 km (1,130 mi, 982 nmi)
- Service ceiling: 8,900 m (29,200 ft)

Armament

- Guns:
  - 2 × 20 mm (0.787 in) MG 151/20 cannon
  - 2 × 7.92 mm (0.312 in) MG 17 machine gun
  - 2 × 13 mm (0.512 in) MG 131 machine guns (rear armament), one each in FDSL 131/1B remotely operated turret
- Bombs: maximum 1,000 kg (2,204 lb) internally
- 2 × 500 kg (1,100 lb) SC500 bombs
- 2 × 250 kg (550 lb) SC 250 bombs
- 8 × 50 kg (110 lb) SC 50 bombs

== See also ==
Related development

- Messerschmitt Bf 110
- Messerschmitt Me 310
- Messerschmitt Me 410 Hornisse

Aircraft of comparable role, configuration, and era

- Arado Ar 240
- Focke-Wulf Fw 187 Falke
- Varga RMI-1 X/H

Related lists

- List of military aircraft of Germany
- List of aircraft of Hungary in World War II

== Bibliography ==
=== Bibliography ===
- "Hornisse ... The Last Zerstorer". Air International, October 1981, Vol. 21 No. 4. ISSN 0306-5634. pp. 181–185, 197–200.
- Mankau, Heinz. "Messerschmitt Bf 110, Me 210, Me 410: an illustrated history". Atglen, PA: Schiffer Pub., 2003. ISBN 978-0-7643-1784-2
- Petrick, Peter. "Messerschmitt Me 210/Me 410 Hornisse/Hornet: an illustrated production history". Hinckley: Midland, 2007. ISBN 978-1-85780-271-9
- Mujzer, Peter (January 1997). "Les Messerschmitt Me 210Ca hongrois (première part)" [The Hungarian Messerschmitt Me 210Cas]. Avions: Toute l'aéronautique et son histoire (in French) (46): 10–14. ISSN 1243-8650.
- Mujzer, Peter (February 1997). "Les Messerschmitt Me 210Ca hongrois (deuxième part)". Avions: Toute l'aéronautique et son histoire (in French) (47): 14–18. ISSN 1243-8650.
- Punka, George. "Messerschmitt Me 210/410 in Action". Carrollton, TX: Squadron/Signal Publications, 1994. ISBN 0-89747-320-5
