= Messerschmitt Me 410 Hornisse =

German fighter-bomber

Me 410
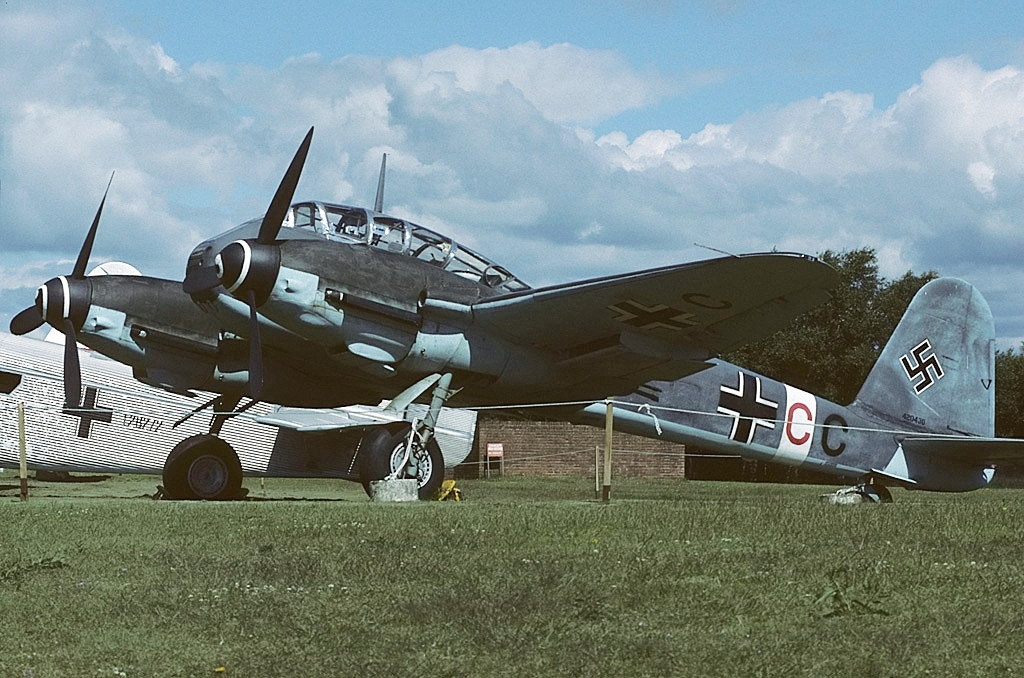
- Me 410 A-1/U2, RAF Museum Cosford, 1985

General information
- Type: Heavy fighter, fighter-bomber
- Manufacturer: Messerschmitt
- Primary users: Luftwaffe Hungarian Air Force
- Number built: 1,189

History
- Manufactured: May 1943-August 1944
- Introduction date: 1943
- First flight: 14 March 1942
- Retired: 1945
- Developed from: Messerschmitt Me 210

The Messerschmitt Me 410 Hornisse (Hornet) is a heavy fighter and Schnellbomber ("Fast Bomber" in English) designed and produced by the German aircraft manufacturer Messerschmitt. It was flown by the Luftwaffe during the latter half of the Second World War.

Work began on producing a successor to the Bf 110 in 1937, however, the resulting Me 210 proved to be unsatisfactory, leading to production being halted in April 1942. Various options were considered, including the ambitious Me 310 derivative. Officials favoured an incremental improvement which was represented by the Me 410. Although visually similar to the preceding Me 210 and sharing sufficient design similarities that incomplete Me 210s could be converted into Me 410s, there were key differences between the two aircraft. Chiefly, the Me 410 was powered by larger Daimler-Benz DB 603 engines, had a lengthened fuselage, and automatic leading edge slats.

During late 1942, the Reichsluftfahrtministerium (RLM) were sufficiently convinced by the programme to proceed with quantity production of the type, the first Me 410s being delivered during January 1943. Various models were produced, including the Me 410A-1 light bomber, the A-1/U1 aerial reconnaissance aircraft, the A-1/U2 bomber destroyer, and the A-2/U4 night fighter. Upon their entry to service, the type was promptly flown on night time bombing missions in the British Isles, where the night fighters of the Royal Air Force (RAF) typically struggled to intercept it. The Me 410 was also used as a bomber destroyer against the daylight bomber formations of the United States Army Air Forces (USAAF); it was moderately successful against unescorted bombers through 1943, but proved to be no match in a dogfight with the lighter Allied single-engine fighters, such as the North American P-51 Mustang and Supermarine Spitfire. Following the Normandy landings, Me 410s were amongst the numerous Axis aircraft sent against the incoming Allied forces.

From mid-1944, all Me 410s were withdrawn from Defence of the Reich duties and production was phased out in favour of heavily armed single-engine fighters as dedicated bomber destroyers. The final role of the Me 410 was aerial reconnaissance. Only two Me 410s have survived in preservation into the twenty-first century.

== Design and development ==
=== Background ===
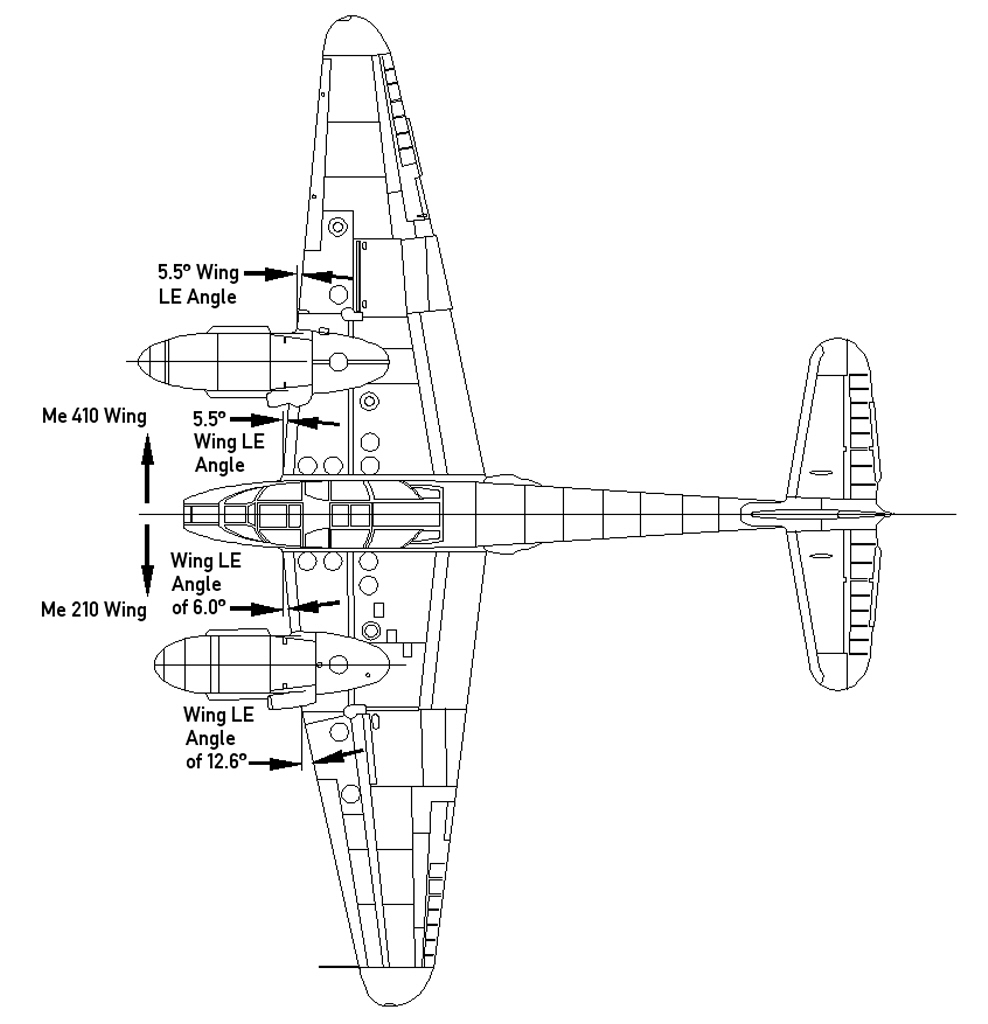
Basic side-by-side comparison of the Me 210 and Me 410 wing planforms

The origins of the Me 410 are closely associated with the preceding Me 210. Development of this aircraft had been projected back in 1937 as a multi-purpose successor to the Bf 110, which had some identified shortcomings even prior to seeing combat service. Early on, confidence in the Me 210 had been high, to the extent that 1,000 aircraft were ordered off the drawing board; however, it was a troubled programme. Flight testing revealed poor longitudinal stability and, despite modifications, was considered to be unsatisfactory. While quantity production of the type proceeded, the Me 210 had a relatively high rate of accidents. This heavily contributed to production being halted on 14 April 1942. Officials were keen to remedy the Me 210's problems and return it to production to minimise the economic loss incurred.

Modifications to the design were explored, including the Me 310, a radical high-altitude derivative that incorporated a pressurised cockpit and more powerful engines. This option was not favoured by many officials, who sought a less ambitious remediation of the Me 210. It was this preference that led to the emergence of the Me 410, which was visually almost identical to the Me 210.

=== Design ===
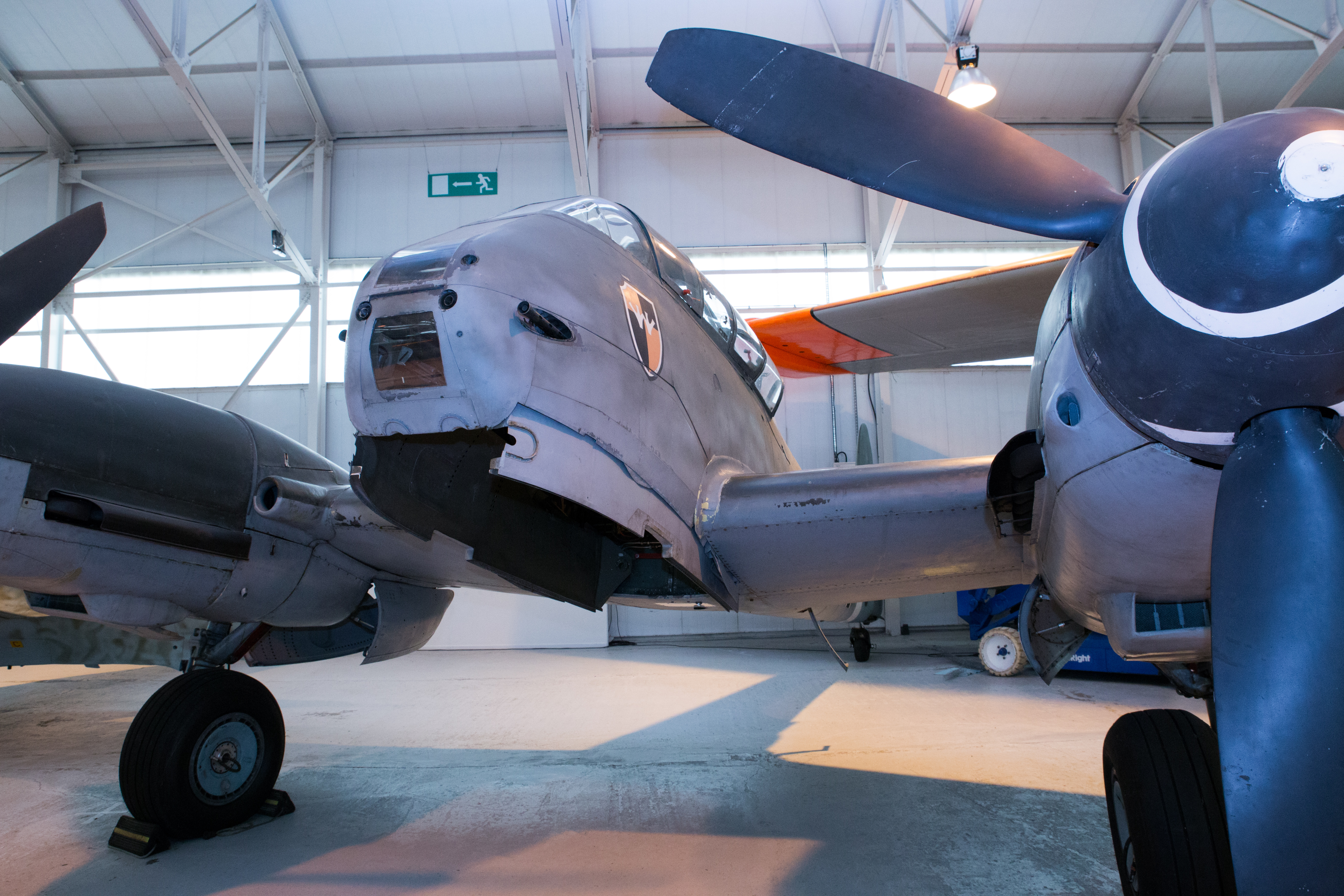
The RAF Museum's Me 410, with the doors of its nose bomb-bay open, 2016

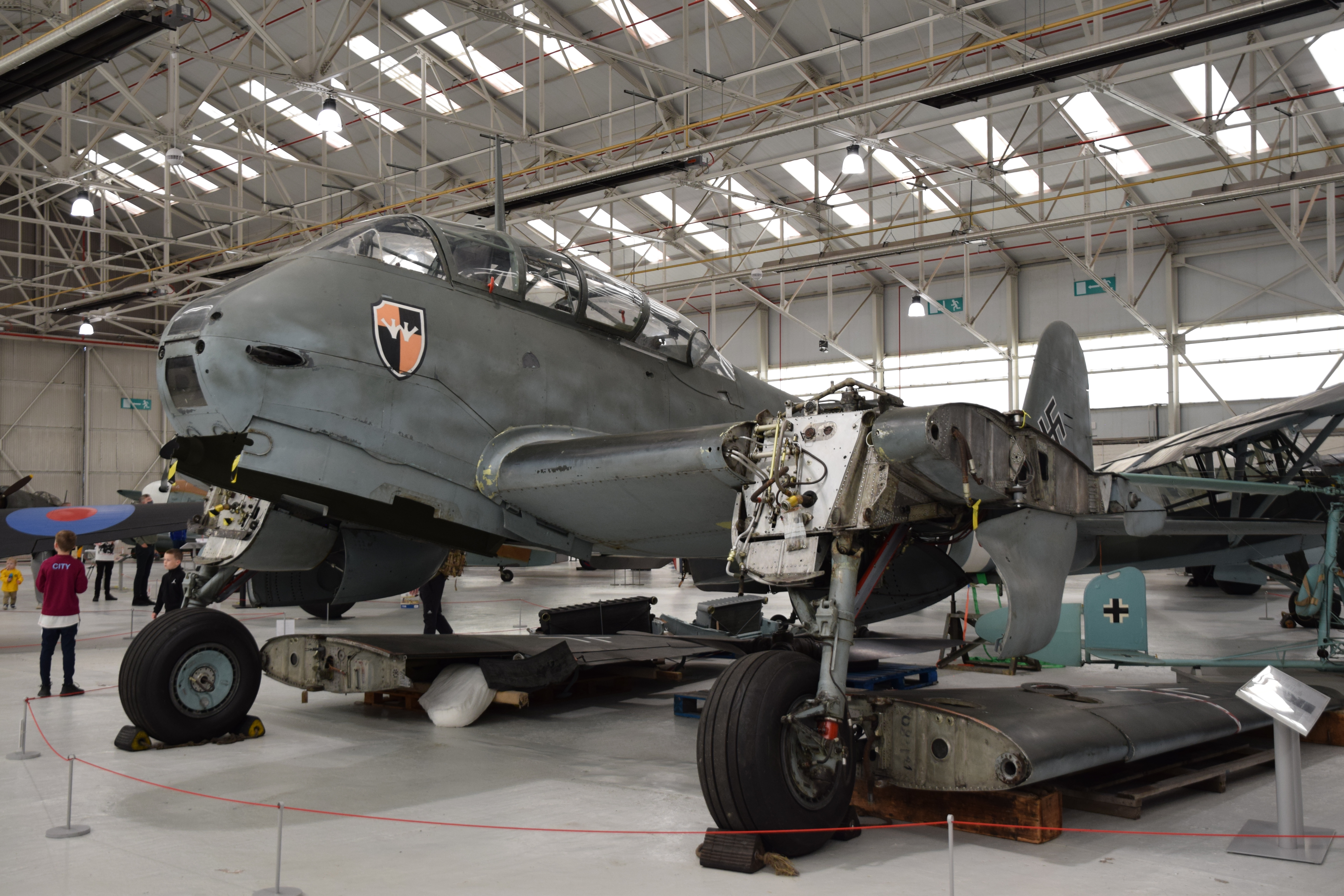
The RAF Museum's Me 410 with the engines and the outer-wings removed, 2020

The principal difference between the Me 210 and Me 410 was the adoption of the larger (at 44.5 litres, 2,720 cu in displacement) and more powerful Daimler-Benz DB 603A engines. These engines each provided 1,750 metric horsepower (1,730 hp; 1,290 kW) compared to the 1,475 metric horsepower (1,455 hp; 1,085 kW) of the DB 605s used on the Me 210C (Note: The interim Me 310 design experiment actually used the DB 603 powerplant choice first.). The extra power increased the Me 410's maximum speed to 625 kilometres per hour (388 mph), greatly improved rate of climb, service ceiling, and the cruising speed, the latter being raised to 579 km/h (360 mph).

The more powerful engines also improved payload capability to the point where the aircraft could lift a war-load greater than could fit into the bomb bay under the nose. Consequently, shackles were added under the wings for four 50-kilogram (110 lb) bombs. The changes added an extra 680 kg (1,500 lb) to the Me 210 design, but the extra engine power more than made up for the difference. As with the Me 210, the Me 410's rear gunner used the same pair of Ferngerichtete Drehringseitenlafette FDSL 131/1B turrets mounted on each side of the aircraft, each still armed with a 13 mm (.51 in) MG 131 machine gun, retaining the same pivoting handgun-style grip, trigger and gunsight to aim and fire the ordnance as the Me 210 did.

The new version included a lengthened fuselage and new, automatic leading edge slats. Both features had been tested on Me 210s and were found to dramatically improve handling. The slats had originally been featured on the earliest Me 210 models, but had been removed on production models due to poor handling. When entering a steep turn, the slats had a tendency to open due to the high angle of attack, analogous to the opening of the slats during the landing approach. This problem was first observed on the Bf 109V14 and V15 prototypes for the Bf 109E, which added to the difficulty in keeping the aircraft flying smoothly. When the problems with the general lateral instability were addressed, this was no longer a real problem. While the Me 410 came to be regarded as a relatively stable aircraft, it had a poorer rate of turn than the Bf 110 it was intended to replace.

The wing panels of the earlier Me 210 had been designed with a planform geometry that placed the aerodynamic center farther back compared with the earlier Bf 110, giving the outer sections of the wing planform beyond each engine nacelle a slightly greater, 12.6° leading edge sweepback angle than the inner panels' 6.0° leading edge sweep angle. This resulted in unsuitable handling characteristics in flight for the original Me 210 design. The new Me 410 outer wing panels had their planform geometry revised to bring the aerodynamic centre farther forward in comparison with the Me 210, making the leading edge sweepback of the outer panels identical to the inner wing panels with both having identical 5.5° sweepback angles, which improved handling.

=== Into flight ===
During late 1942, six Me 210As were taken off the assembly line for conversion to Me 410 standard. Near the end of that year, the Me 410 V1 prototype performed its maiden flight. Shortly thereafter, the Reichsluftfahrtministerium (RLM) was suitably convinced by its performance to place a sizable production order for the Me 410.

Deliveries of the Me 410 began in January 1943, two years late and continued until September 1944, by which point a total of 1,160 of all versions had been produced by Messerschmitt's facility in Augsburg and Dornier plant in Munich. There were models produced to serve in distinct roles, including the Me 410A-1 light bomber, the A-1/U1 aerial reconnaissance platform, the A-1/U2 bomber destroyer, the A-2/U4 night fighter. When the Me 410 arrived, it was typically appreciated by its crews, even though its improved performance was not enough to protect it from the waves of high performance Allied fighters that it routinely confronted at this stage of the conflict.

== Operational history ==
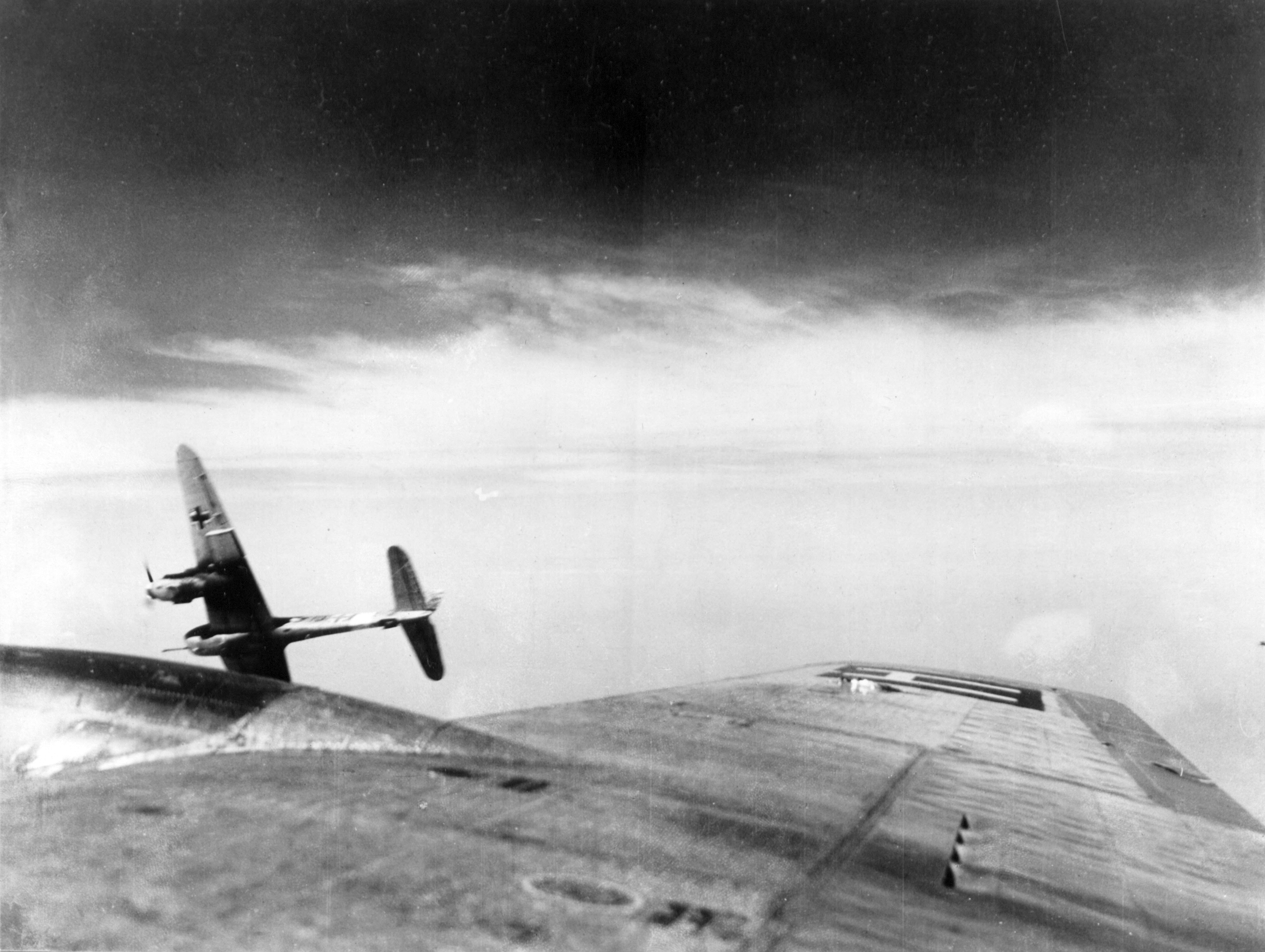
An Me 410A-1/U4 with a BK 5 cannon peels off during an attack on USAAF B-17s

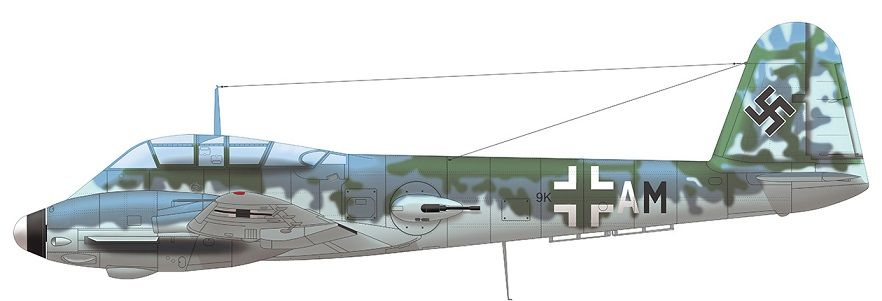
Messerschmitt Me 410A-1/U2 (W. Nr. 420428, 9K+AM) flown by Obfw. Hermann Bolten of the 4./KG 51, shot down June 6th, 1944

When performing night bomber missions against the British Isles, the Me 410A-1 proved to be an elusive target for the opposing night fighters of the Royal Air Force (RAF). The first unit to operate over the UK was V./KG 2, which lost its first Me 410 on the night of 13 – 14 July 1943, when it was shot down by a de Havilland Mosquito of No. 85 Squadron. Nevertheless, the Me 410 played a prominent role in the bombing of London during early 1944.

The Me 410 was also used as a bomber destroyer against the daylight bomber formations of the United States Army Air Forces (USAAF), upgraded with Umrüst-Bausätze factory conversion kits, all bearing a /U suffix, for the design—these suffixes could vary in meaning between subtypes. As one example, the earlier Me 410 A-1/U1 designation signified a camera-fitting in the under-nose ordnance bay for reconnaissance use (as the A-3 was meant to do from its start), while the Me 410 B-2/U1 designation signified a mount of a pair of the long barreled, 30 mm MK 103 cannon in the undernose ordnance bay.

The /U2 suffix designated a fitment of two additional 20 mm MG 151/20 cannons in the under-nose ordnance bay instead—the A-1/U4 subtype fitted the massive, 540-kilogram (1,190 lb) Bordkanone series 50 mm (2 in) BK 5 cannon, loaded with 21 rounds in the same under-nose ordnance bay in place of either the /U1's cameras or MK 103s, or the /U2's added pair of MG 151/20 autocannon. For breaking up the bomber formations, many Me 410s also had four underwing tubular launchers, two per wing panel, firing converted 21 cm (8 in) Werfer-Granate 21 infantry barrage rockets. Two Geschwader, Zerstörergeschwader 26 and 76, were thus equipped with the Me 410 by late 1943.

The type was moderately successful against unescorted bombers through 1943, achieving a considerable number of kills against USAAF day bomber formations. However, the Me 410 proved to be no match in a dogfight with the lighter Allied single-engine fighters such as the North American P-51 Mustang and Supermarine Spitfire. In early 1944, the Me 410 formations encountered swarms of Allied fighters protecting the bomber streams, usually flying far ahead of the combat box formations as an air supremacy move in clearing the skies of any Luftwaffe opposition, resulting in the Me 410's previous successes against escorted bombers now often being offset by their losses. An example of this—as part of a campaign started two days earlier by the USAAF—was on 6 March 1944 during an attack on Berlin by 750 8th AF heavy bombers, when 16 Me 410s were shot down in return for eight B-17 Flying Fortresses and four P-51s, which were destroyed by Bf 109 and Fw 190 fighters escorting the Me 410s.

On 11 April, with 8th AF raids hitting Sorau, Rostock and Oschersleben, II./ZG 26's Me 410s accounted for a rare clear success, initially bringing down 10 B-17s without any losses. During the same raid, their second sortie was intercepted by P-51s that destroyed eight Me 410s and three Bf 110s. Sixteen crewmen were killed and three wounded.

In April 1944, the first Me 410Bs were delivered. Units commonly converted to the type from bomber aircraft, such as the Junkers Ju 88. In response to the Normandy landings, Me 410s were repeatedly dispatched against the incoming Allied forces.

From mid-1944, despite being known to be the favourite bomber destroyer of Adolf Hitler, the Me 410 units were taken from Defence of the Reich duties and production was phased out in favour of heavily armed single-engine fighters as dedicated bomber destroyers, with the Me 410s remaining in service flying on reconnaissance duties only.

== Variants ==
A-series aircraft were armed with two 7.92 mm (.312 in) MG 17 machine guns and two 20 mm MG 151/20 cannons in the nose and delivered as the Me 410 A-1 light bomber. The Me 410 A-2 heavy fighter was cancelled because the dual 30 mm (1.18 in) MK 103 cannon mount, also available for the later Me 410 B-2 subtype, as the Umrüst-Bausatz /U1 factory kit available by 1944, was not ready in time.

The Me 410 A featured a bomb bay for carrying bombs. By fitting conversion kits, this could be used for other equipment. Initially, three Umrüst-Bausätze (factory conversion kits) were available: the U1 which contained cameras for photo-reconnaissance, the U2 with two 20 mm MG 151/20 cannon with 250 rounds-per-gun for the heavy fighter. And the U4 with a 50 mm (2 in) Bordkanone, BK-5 cannon with 22 rounds (21 rounds to load and 1 extra round in the breech). The purpose of this was to convert either an Me 410 A or B-series aircraft into a bomber destroyer.

The BK 5 cannon – derived from the 5 cm (2 in) KwK 39 L/60 of the Panzer III tank – allowed Me 410s to shoot at their targets from over 914 m (1,000 yd), a distance far greater than the range of the bombers' defensive machine-guns. In practice frequent problems with jamming, the limited ammunition supply and with the extra 540-kilogram (1,190 lb) weight of the large-calibre gun under the nose made the other anti-bomber versions of Me 410, especially those with extra 20 mm MG 151/20s, much more useful.

The reconnaissance version Me 410 A-3 received a deeper fuselage for additional cameras and fuel. The Me 410 A-3 entered service in small numbers in early 1944 and equipped three long-range reconnaissance Aufklärungsstaffel squadrons, usually grouped larger, three or four-squadron Fernaufklärungsgruppen, one Gruppe on the Western Front and the other two on the Eastern Front.

The Me 410 B-series was similar to the A-series but replaced the pair of 7.92 mm (.312 in) MG 17s with 13 mm (.51 in) MG 131 machine guns. The originally planned 1,900 hp (1,400 kW) DB 603G engine had been cancelled in early 1944, so all Me 410 Bs used DB 603A or DB 603AA engines. The DB 603G would have increased the maximum speed to 630 kilometres per hour (390 mph) and cruising speed to 595 kilometres per hour (370 mph), although the weight increased once again. The versions were the same as with the A-series, the Me 410 B-1 and Me 410 B-3 filling the same roles as the earlier A-1 and A-3 versions, also with the option of using the same Umrüst-Bausätze factory conversion kits as the A-series.

Several experimental models were developed. The Me 410 B-5 added shackles under the fuselage to carry a torpedo, and removed the MG 131s in the nose to make room for the FuG 200 Hohentwiel 550 MHz UHF-band maritime patrol radar. The bomb bay was not used in this version in order to make room for a 650-litre (170 US gal) fuel tank, and the rearward-firing remote turrets were replaced by another 700 L (180 US gal) fuel tank for long-range missions. The Me 410 B-6 was a similar anti-shipping conversion, but intended for the short-range coastal defence role only. For this mission, it did not use a torpedo, and was instead a simple modification of the B-1 with the FuG 200 radar. The Me 410 B-7/B-8 were updated B-3 reconnaissance models that were never actually built.

The Me 410 C was a high-altitude version drawn up in early 1944, with two new wing designs that increased span to 18.25 or 20.45 metres (59.9 or 67.1 ft). The larger wings allowed the gear to retract directly to the rear. A new universal engine mount would allow for the use of any of the DB 603JZ or BMW 801J turbocharged engines or the Jumo 213E two-stage mechanically supercharged engines, driving a new four-blade propeller with very wide blades. The BMW 801 radials were air-cooled and the DB 603 and Jumo 213 used an annular radiator, all Kraftei (power-egg) engine "modules" onto an airframe for ease of installation and field maintenance, so the normal under-wing radiators were removed. None were ever built, as Me 410 production was cancelled before the engines matured.

The Me 410 D was a simpler upgrade to the B-series to improve altitude performance than the C-series. It would be powered by the DB 603JZ engines, and had a revised forward fuselage to increase the field of view of the pilot and reduce drag. It replaced portions of the outer wing panels with ones made of wood to conserve strategic materials. Several were built, but like many other attempts at wood construction by the German aviation industry late in World War II, the loss of the Goldschmitt Tego film factory in Wuppertal, in a Royal Air Force night bombing raid, meant the acidic replacement adhesives available were too corrosive to the materials being bonded, and the wooden portions tended to fail. In August 1944, the month after the Jägernotprogramm had gone into effect, production was cancelled to concentrate on Bf 109Gs, after 1,160 Me 410s had been built, .

== Operators ==
Nazi Germany

- Luftwaffe was the Me 410's primary operator, using it between 1943 and 1945.
  - Stabsschwarm & 2.(F)/Aufklärungsgruppe 22
  - 1.(F)/Aufklärungsgruppe 33
  - 1.(F)/FAGr.121
  - 1.,2(Ekdo).,5.(F)/Aufklärungsgruppe 122 (later FAGr 122)
  - Seenotgruppe 80 (sea recon and rescue)
  - 9.,20./ZG 1 'Wespen'
  - 2.,4.,6.,Stab/ZG 26 'Horst Wessel'
  - 1.,2.,3.,/ZG 76
  - Eprobungskommando/(Z)25
  - 5.(nacht),14.(nacht),15.,16./KG 2 (night intruder)
  - 1.(Jagd),2.(nacht),5.(Erg/jagd),6./KG 51 'Edelweiss' (long-range night ops)
  - 1./NJG 5 (Mosquito chaser)
  - 3./NJG 1 (Mosquito chaser)

United Kingdom

- Royal Air Force received at least two captured aircraft during war and shortly after.
  - No. 1426 Flight RAF operated a single Me 410 A-3 (WNr.10259, RAF serial TF209) during the war.

== Surviving aircraft ==
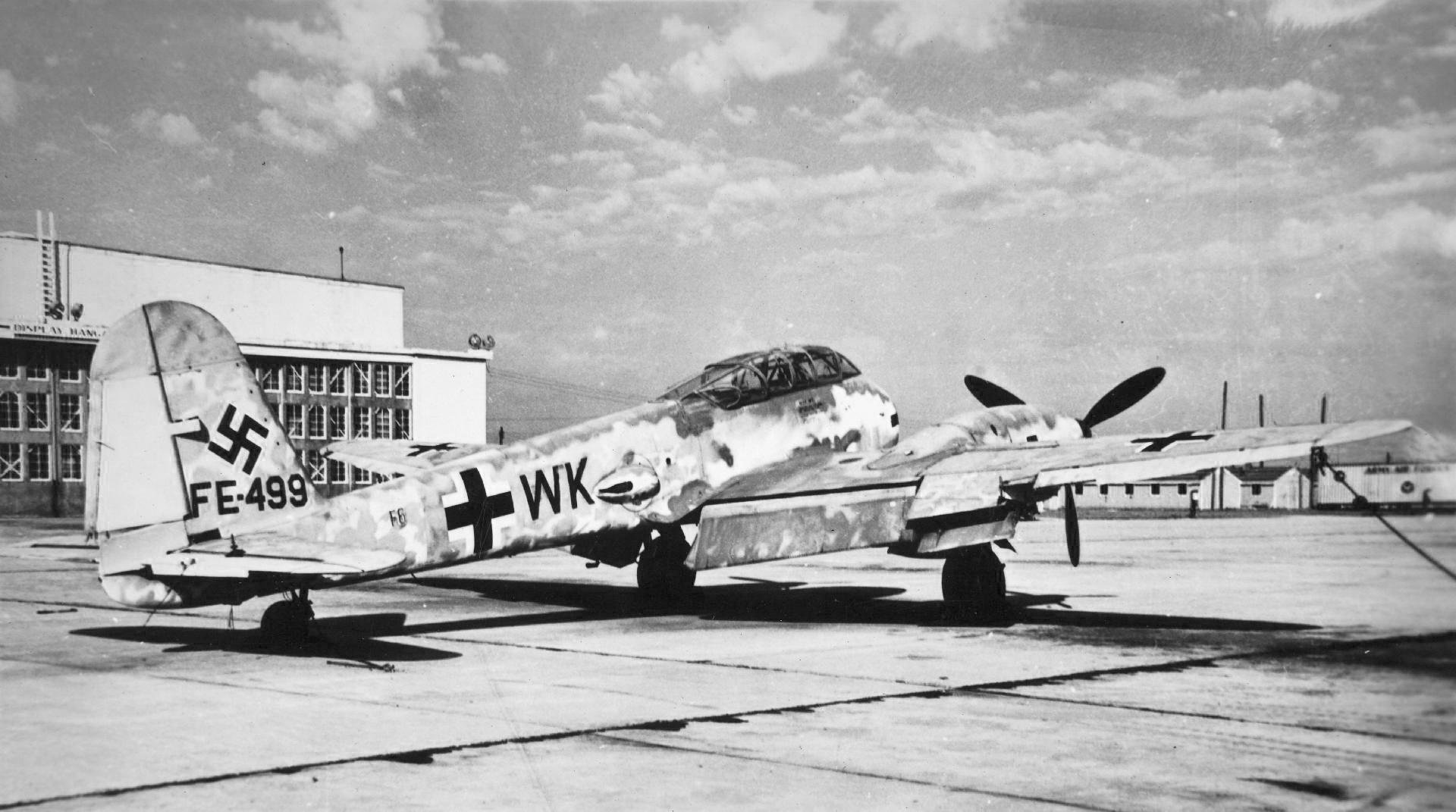
Me 410, W.Nr.10018, (FE499) after being sent to the United States

Two Me 410s survive:

Me 410 A-1/U1 (W.Nr.10018, converted from Me 210 airframe)
This aircraft, held by the American National Air and Space Museum and awaiting restoration, is at the Paul E. Garber Preservation, Restoration, and Storage Facility, located in Suitland Maryland. It was found intact at an airfield in Trapani, Sicily, in August 1943 bearing the markings of the Luftwaffe's 2.Staffel/Fernaufklärungsgruppe 122 and was shipped to the United States in 1944; it was given the US serial number FE499.

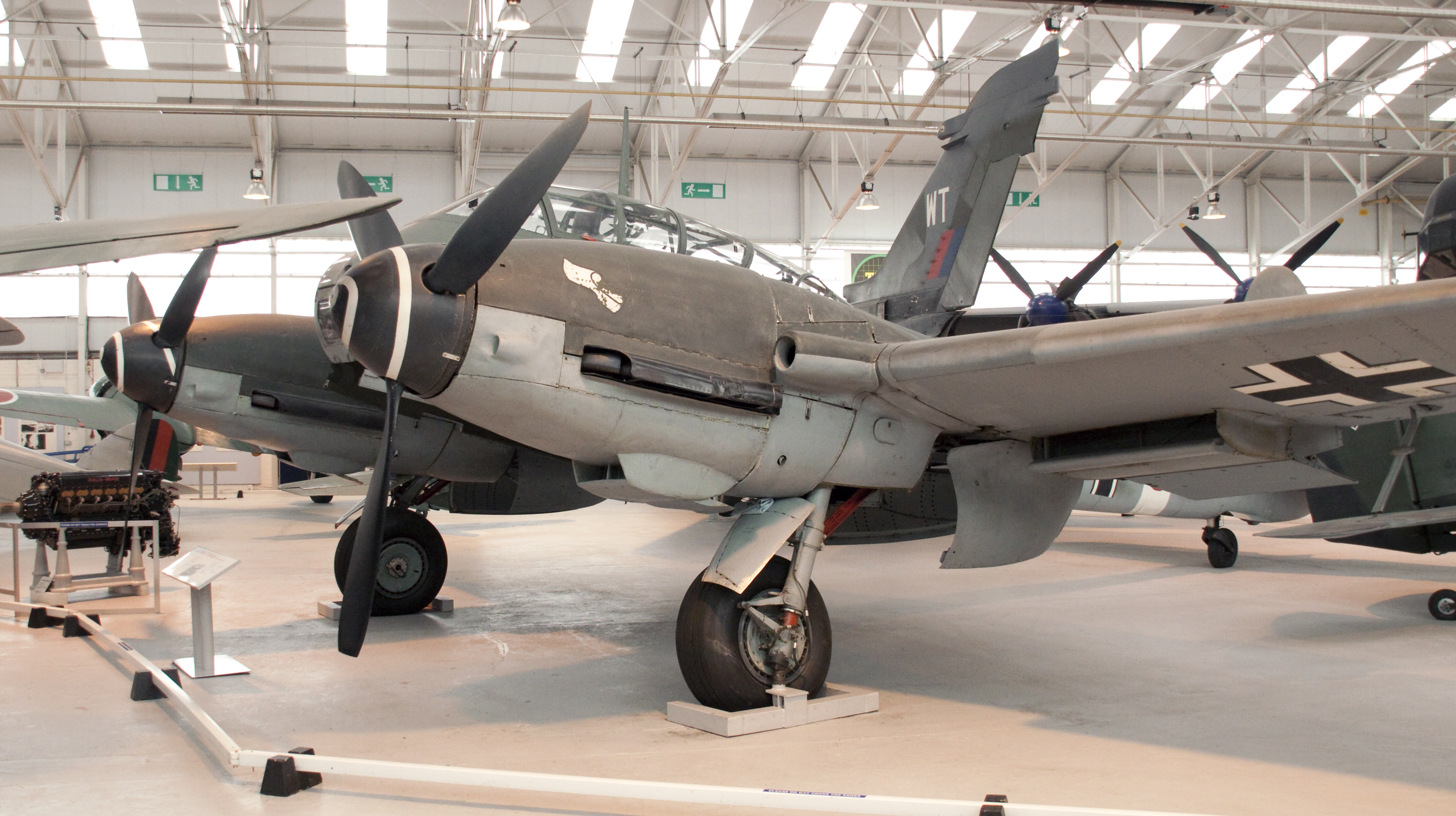
Me 410, W.Nr.420430, RAF Museum Cosford (2009)

Me 410 A-1/U2 (W.Nr.420430)
This aircraft is part of the collection of the RAF Museum and is publicly displayed at the Royal Air Force Museum Midlands, Cosford. It was built in late 1943 by Messerschmitt in Augsburg. There is evidence it served with Zerstörergeschwader 26 before being surrendered at Vaerlose, Denmark in May 1945. It was one of six Me 410s that were taken to the UK in 1945 for evaluation, but the only one to be later selected for preservation and to avoid being scrapped. It underwent restoration in 1986, after which both engines were successfully run on the ground. It was moved to Cosford in 1989 and has remained there since.

== Specifications (Me 410 A-1/U-2) ==
Data from The Warplanes of the Third Reich, German Combat Planes

General characteristics

- Crew: two
- Length: 12.484 m (40 ft 11.5 in)
- Wingspan: 16.3513 m (53 ft 7.75 in)
- Height: 4.280 m (14 ft 0.5 in)
- Wing area: 36.2031 m^{2} (389.687 sq ft)
- Airfoil: root: NACA 23018-636.5; tip: NACA 23010-636.5
- Empty weight: 7,518 kg (16,574 lb)
- Gross weight: 9,651 kg (21,276 lb)
- Fuel capacity: 550 imp gal (660 US gal; 2,500 L) in four wing tanks
- Powerplant: 2 × Daimler-Benz DB 603A V-12 inverted liquid-cooled piston engines, 1,290 kW (1,750 hp) each for take-off

1,360 kW (1,850 PS) at 2,100 m (6,890 ft)
1,195 kW (1,625 PS) at 5,700 m (18,700 ft)

- Propellers: 3-bladed VDM constant-speed propeller

Performance

- Maximum speed: 507 km/h (315 mph, 274 kn) at sea level, 624 km/h (388 mph; 337 kn) at 6,700 m (21,980 ft)
- Cruise speed: 587 km/h (365 mph, 317 kn)
- Range: 1,200 km (750 mi, 650 nmi) at maximum continuous cruise speed, 1,690 km (1,050 mi) at economical cruise speed
- Ferry range: 2,300 km (1,400 mi, 1,200 nmi)
- Service ceiling: 10,000 m (33,000 ft)
- Time to altitude: 6,000 m (20,000 ft) in ten minutes and 42 seconds

Armament

- Guns: ** 2 × 7.92 mm (0.31 in) MG 17 machine guns with 1,000 rpg, firing forward
  - 2 × 20 mm (0.79 in) MG 151/20 cannon with 350 rpg, firing forward
  - 2 × 20 mm (0.79 in) MG 151/20 cannon with 250 rpg in the bomb bay, firing forward
  - 2 × 13 mm (0.51 in) MG 131 machine guns with 500 rpg, each firing rearward from FDSL 131/1B remote-operated turret, one per side
- Rockets: 4 × 21 cm (8.3 in) Werfer-Granate 21 rockets
- Bombs: up to 1,000 kg (2,200 lb) of disposable stores

== See also ==
Related development

- Messerschmitt Me 210
- Messerschmitt Me 310

Aircraft of comparable role, configuration, and era

- Bristol Beaufighter
- de Havilland Mosquito
- Kawasaki Ki-102
- Messerschmitt Bf 110
- Northrop P-61 Black Widow
- Rikugun Ki-93
