= Dervish (rocket) =

- Type: Unguided rocket
- Place of origin: United States

Production history
- Designed: 1950s
- Manufacturer: Northrop Corporation

Specifications
- Diameter: 2.75 inches (70 mm)
- Engine: Thiokol TRX-126B
- Propellant: Solid fuel
- Guidance system: Unguided

Dervish was an unguided air-to-air and air-to-surface rocket developed by the Northrop Corporation for use by the United States Navy and United States Army during the early 1950s. Originally intended as an air-to-air rocket to replace the Mighty Mouse rocket, it was later expanded in role to also operate in an air-to-surface capacity. Spin-stabilized, 2.75 inches (70 mm) in diameter, and powered by a Thiokol TRX-126B solid fuel rocket, in 1958 development of Dervish was resumed as a solely Army project, but no production ever emerged.
