= Gimlet (rocket) =

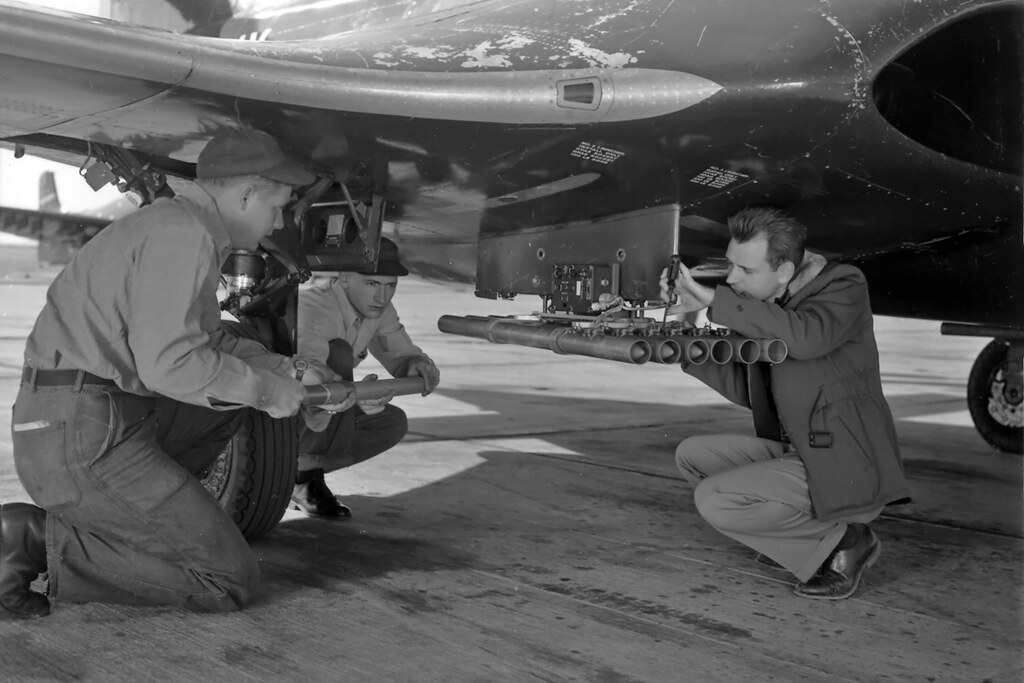
- Six-round Gimlet rocket launcher on a F2H Banshee
- Type: Unguided rocket
- Place of origin: United States

Production history
- Designed: 1954–1956
- Manufacturer: Naval Ordnance Test Station
- Produced: 1956–1957
- No. built: 15,000

Specifications
- Diameter: 2 inches (51 mm)
- Propellant: Solid fuel
- Guidance system: Unguided

The Gimlet was an unguided air-to-air and air-to-surface rocket developed by the United States Navy during the early 1950s. Although it proved successful in testing and was ordered into large-scale production, the arrival of the guided missile as a practical and reliable weapon resulted in the cancellation of the Gimlet rocket in 1957.

== Design and development ==
The development of the Gimlet rocket began in 1951, with the initiation of development of a 1.5-inch (38 mm) rocket for air-to-air use. Work on the rocket was conducted at the Naval Ordnance Test Station (NOTS) at China Lake, California, and the project was begun at the behest of North American Aviation. in addition, the 1.5-inch rocket was felt as the ideal caliber to 'fill in a gap' in the U.S. Navy's rocket inventory; studies indicated that aircraft could carry six times the number of 1.5-inch rockets as opposed to the then-in-service 2.75-inch (70 mm) Folding Fin Aerial Rocket.

In 1952, however, the Bureau of Ordnance decided that neither the 1.5-inch or 2.75-inch rocket was required; an earlier directive to develop a 2-inch (51 mm) rocket was still outstanding, and it was felt that standardizing on a single caliber of rocket would be in the Navy's best interest. NOTS had initiated development of a rocket of the 2-inch caliber prior to the outbreak of the Korean War; the concept had been shelved with the war effort requiring higher-priority projects such as the Ram anti-tank rocket to be prioritized; now, however, the project was dusted off and development resumed under the name "Gimlet" – a name that, it was said, meant the rocket was to be a "small anti-MiG" weapon; "Gim" being "MiG" backwards, with an added diminutive.

Gimlet was primarily intended for use in the air-to-air role. The rocket would use a modified version of the FFAR's fuse, reduced in size to fit the smaller rocket; the warhead used for Gimlet took advantage of the latest advancements in explosives technology, and, combined with the advanced fuse, would detonate inside the target aircraft, instead of upon contact. The rocket used a thin-walled aluminum body, also based on FFAR work; the motor used an eight-point star configuration to ensure even burning.

== Operational history ==
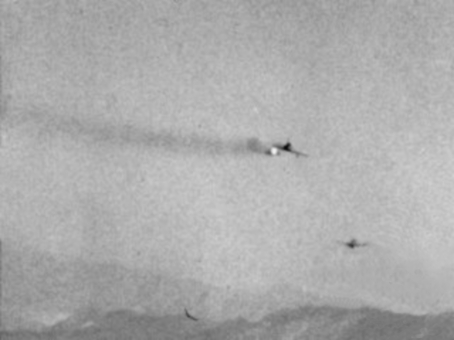
A FJ-2 Fury launches a Gimlet rocket against a F6F target drone

Testing of the Gimlet began in 1954. In the initial test, a FJ-2 Fury shot down a F6F Hellcat target drone, proving the rocket's effectiveness in the air-to-air role. Early launchers carried four rockets, while seven- and 19-round models were developed as well. A six-round clip capable of fitting the internal rocket bays of the F4D Skyray interceptor was also developed.

Following a flyoff against the T-214 rocket, which indicated the necessity to modify the rocket motor to reduce the Gimlet's visual signature, the Navy directed the development of a modified, 'hybrid' rocket, using the T-214's tail; this became known as "T-Gimlet". The modified rocket was considered to be suitable for the Navy's purposes; both the original Gimlet and the T-Gimlet were ordered for production, a 5 million dollar USD contract being allotted to start production at the Shumaker Naval Ammunition Depot in Arkansas.

Despite the seeming success, however, the Gimlet was already becoming obsolete; guided missiles were now considered to be the wave of the future. Production of Gimlet was cancelled in early 1957, after production of 15,000 rockets; that October, the T-Gimlet version was cancelled as well. Although the missile age meant that Gimlet did not enter operational service, the production processes developed for the rocket would be modified and used in the production of the AIM-9 Sidewinder air-to-air missile.
