= Messerschmitt Me 310 =

German heavy fighter prototype

Me 310

General information
- Type: Heavy fighter
- Manufacturer: Messerschmitt
- Number built: 1

History
- First flight: 11 September 1943

The Messerschmitt Me 310 was a prototype German heavy fighter of World War II. It was a project to save the aerodynamically troubled Me 210.

== Design and development ==
The armament was to be the same as the Me 210 A-1: two 20 mm MG 151/20 cannon, two 7.92 mm (.312 in) MG 17 machine guns, and two remotely controlled, rearward-firing 13 mm (.51 in) MG 131 machine guns.

A single aircraft was built by converting Me 210 V13 (code GI+SQ). It had a pressurised cockpit and was powered by two 1,380 kW (1,850 hp) Daimler-Benz DB 603A inline engines. The Me 310 first flew on 11 September 1943, but the project was cancelled later the same year, as it showed hardly any aerodynamic improvement over the Me 210. A subsequent prototype, the Me 410, showed sufficient improvement in its aerodynamics to be put into production.

== Specifications (Me 310) ==
Data from

General characteristics

- Crew: two (pilot and gunner)
- Length: 12.20 m (39 ft 8 in)
- Wingspan: 17.90 m (58 ft 9 in)
- Height: 4.30 m (14 ft 1 in)
- Wing area: 37.7 m^{2} (406 ft^{2})
- Loaded weight: 11,050 kg (24,360 lb)
- Powerplant: 2× Daimler-Benz DB 603A, 1,380 kW (1,850 hp) each

Performance

- Maximum speed: 655 km/h (408 mph)
- Range: 1,900 km (1,185 mi)
- Service ceiling: 11,000 m (36,000 ft)

Armament

- Guns: *2 × fixed, forward-firing 20 mm MG 151/20 cannons
- 2 × fixed, forward-firing 7.92 mm (.312 in) MG 17 machine guns
- 2 × rearward-firing 13 mm (.51 in) MG 131 machine guns in remote-controlled barbettes

== See also ==
Related development

- Messerschmitt Me 210
- Messerschmitt Me 410
