= Air-to-air rocket =

Unguided projectile fired from aircraft to engage other flying targets

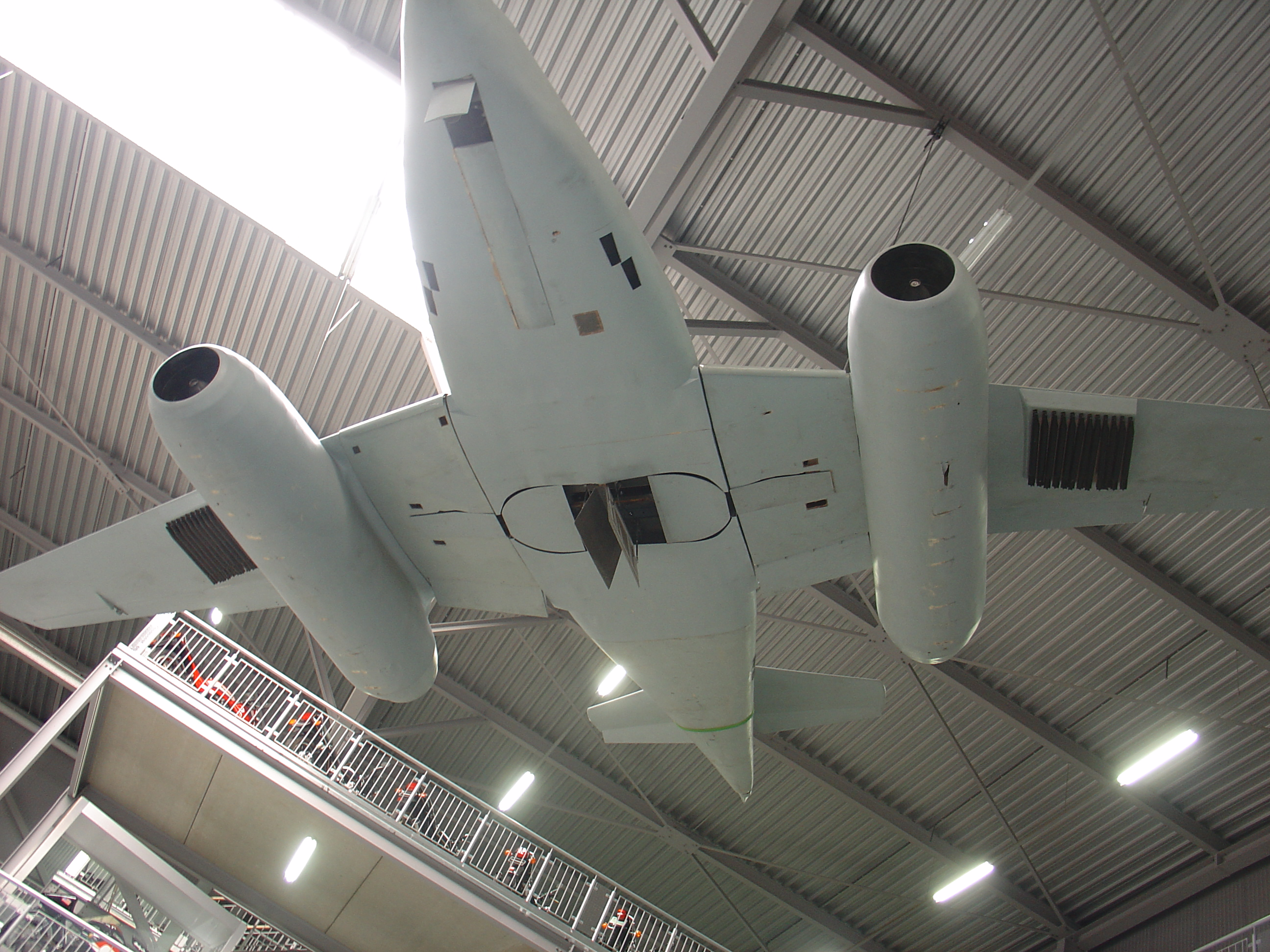
Me 262 with R4M underwing rockets

An air-to-air rocket or air interception rocket is an unguided projectile fired from aircraft to engage other flying targets. They were used briefly in World War I to engage enemy observation balloons and in and after World War II to engage enemy bombers. Fighters were too maneuverable to be effectively engaged with rockets.

== History ==
=== World War I ===
Rockets were used in World War I to engage observation balloons and airships. Success rates were low and the rockets were dangerous to handle in the early fighters built from highly flammable materials. By the end of the war they were replaced by the incendiary Pomeroy bullets. The Pomeroy bullet was developed to strike German Zeppelin airships, by igniting the hydrogen in the balloon. They did not always work. One of the notable rockets from World War I was the Le Prieur rocket which had a range of about 115 m (126 yd), limited by inaccuracy. It was first used in the Battle of Verdun.

=== Interwar period ===
The first known example of a successful attack of air-to-air rockets on another plane took place on August 20, 1939, during the Battle of Khalkhin Gol. A group of Soviet Polikarpov I-16 fighters under command of Captain N. Zvonaryev successfully destroyed a few Japanese warplanes by launching of RS-82 rockets. Soviet RS-82 rockets were mounted on special pylons under wings of Soviet fighters.

=== World War II ===
Air-to-air rockets were utilized in World War II to engage bombers because cannon fire proved ineffective at high closing speeds. On top of that, getting in the range to fire one's guns also meant getting in the range of the bomber's tail gun. The German R4M was the first practical rocket. It was highly successful, but came too late to change the outcome of the war. After experiencing the effectiveness of the German rockets, both the Soviet Union and the United States started developing their own.

The invention of effective air-to-air missiles spelled the end for their unguided counterparts in the 1950s. The capability of steering during the flight trajectory significantly increased the hit percentage over rockets. The United States built one last air-to-air rocket, the AIR-2 Genie. It used a nuclear warhead with a blast radius of 300m to compensate for its inaccuracy.

== List of air-to-air rockets by country ==
=== France ===
- Le Prieur rocket
- SNEB

=== Germany ===
- R4M Orkan
- RZ.65
- Werfer-Granate 21

=== Hungary ===
- 44M Lidérc

=== Japan ===
- Ro-3
- Ro-5
- Type 3 No.1 Mk 28
- Type 3 No.6 Mk 27

=== Sweden ===
- Srak m/55
- Srak m/57

=== United Kingdom ===
- 2-inch RP

=== USA ===
- AIR-2 Genie
- Dervish
- Gimlet
- Mk 4 Fin-Folding Aerial Rocket
- Zuni 5-inch Folding-Fin Aircraft Rocket

=== USSR ===
- AS-5
- RS-82
- S-21
